= Abanilla (Vino de la Tierra) =

Classification of Spanish wines

Abanilla VdlT
- Wine region
- Abanilla VdlT in the region of Murcia
- Type: Vino de la Tierra
- Country: Spain

Vinos de la Tierra regions in the province and region of Murcia (Spain)

Abanilla was a Spanish geographical indication for Vino de la Tierra wines located in the autonomous region of Murcia. Vino de la Tierra is one step below the mainstream Denominación de Origen indication on the Spanish wine quality ladder.

The area covered by this geographical indication comprised the municipalities Abanilla and Fortuna, in the east of the region of Murcia. It acquired its Vino de la Tierra status in 2003. but it later disappeared when the last winery closed down.

Wine in the area is now labelled under the IGP Murcia appellation.

== Grape varieties ==
- Red:

Recommended: Garnacha tinta, Monastrell and Tempranillo
Also authorized: Bonicaire, Forcallat tinta, Petit Verdot, Tempranillo, Garnacha tintorera, Crujidera, Merlot, Syrah and Cabernet Sauvignon

- White:

Recommended: Airén, Merseguera, Moscatel de Alejandría, Pedro Ximénez, Verdil and Macabeo
Also authorized: Chardonnay, Malvasía, Moravia dulce, Moscatel de Grano Menudo and Sauvignon blanc
