= Murcia (Vino de la Tierra) =

Spanish wine designation

Coordinates: 38°28′22.3″N 1°19′24.9″W

IGP Murcia
- Wine region
- Official name: Indicación Geográfica Protegida Murcia / Vino de la Tierra Murcia
- Type: Indicación Geográfica Protegida / Vino de la Tierra
- Year established: 2011
- Country: Spain
- No. of wineries: 11

IGP Murcia is a Spanish geographical indication for Vino de la Tierra wines located in the autonomous region of Murcia. Vino de la Tierra is one step below the mainstream Denominación de Origen indication on the Spanish wine quality ladder, and mirrors the Vins de pays of French wine. It acquired its Vino de la Tierra status in 2011.

The area covered by this geographical indication comprises the municipalities of Abanilla, Bullas, Cartagena, Cehegín, Fortuna, Fuente Álamo, Jumilla, La Unión, Mula, Pliego, Ricote, Torre Pacheco, and Yecla in Murcia.

== Authorised grape varieties ==
The authorised grape varieties are:

- Red: Garnacha Tinta, Monastrell, and Tempranillo / Cencibel are recommended, and Bonicaire, Cabernet Sauvignon, Forcallat tinta, Garnacha Tintorera, Merlot, Moravia Dulce / Crujidera, Petit Verdot, and Syrah are also authorised
- White: Airén, Merseguera, Moscatel de Alejandría, Pedro Ximénez, Verdil, Viura / Macabeo are recommended, and Chardonnay, Malvasía, Moscatel de Grano Menudo, Sauvignon Blanc, Forcallat Blanca, and Viognier
