= Campo de Cartagena (Vino de la Tierra) =

Campo de Cartagena VdlT
- Wine region
- Campo de Cartagena VdlT in the region of Murcia
- Type: Vino de la Tierra
- Country: Spain

Vinos de la Tierra in the Region of Murcia

Campo de Cartagena is a Spanish geographical indication for Vino de la Tierra wines located in the autonomous Region of Murcia. Vino de la Tierra is one step below the mainstream Denominación de Origen indication on the Spanish wine quality ladder.

The area covered by this geographical indication comprises the municipalities of Abanilla (except for Alicante DO), Fortuna, Cartagena, Torre-Pacheco, La Unión and Fuente Álamo de Murcia.

== Authorized grape varieties ==
- Red
  - Recommended: Garnacha, Monastrell, Tempranillo (or Cencibel),
  - Also authorized: Bonicaire, Cabernet Sauvignon, Forcallat, Garnacha tintorera, Merlot, Moravia dulce (or Crujidera), Petit Verdot, Syrah
- White
  - Recommended: Airén, Merseguera (or Meseguera), Moscatel de Alejandría, Pedro Ximénez, Verdil, Viura (or Macabeo)
  - Also authorized: Chardonnay, Malvasia, Moscatel de grano menudo, Sauvignon blanc,
