= Granada (wine) =

Spanish wine designation from Andalusia

Coordinates: 37°11′0″N 3°36′2″W

Granada DOP
- Wine region
- Granada DOP lies within the province of Granada in the region of Andalusia
- Official name: D.O.P. Granada
- Type: Denominación de Origen Protegida (DOP)
- Year established: 2018
- Country: Spain
- No. of vineyards: 213 hectares (526 acres)
- No. of wineries: 17
- Wine produced: 4,289 hectolitres
- Comments: Data for 2016 / 2017

Wine regions in Andalusia

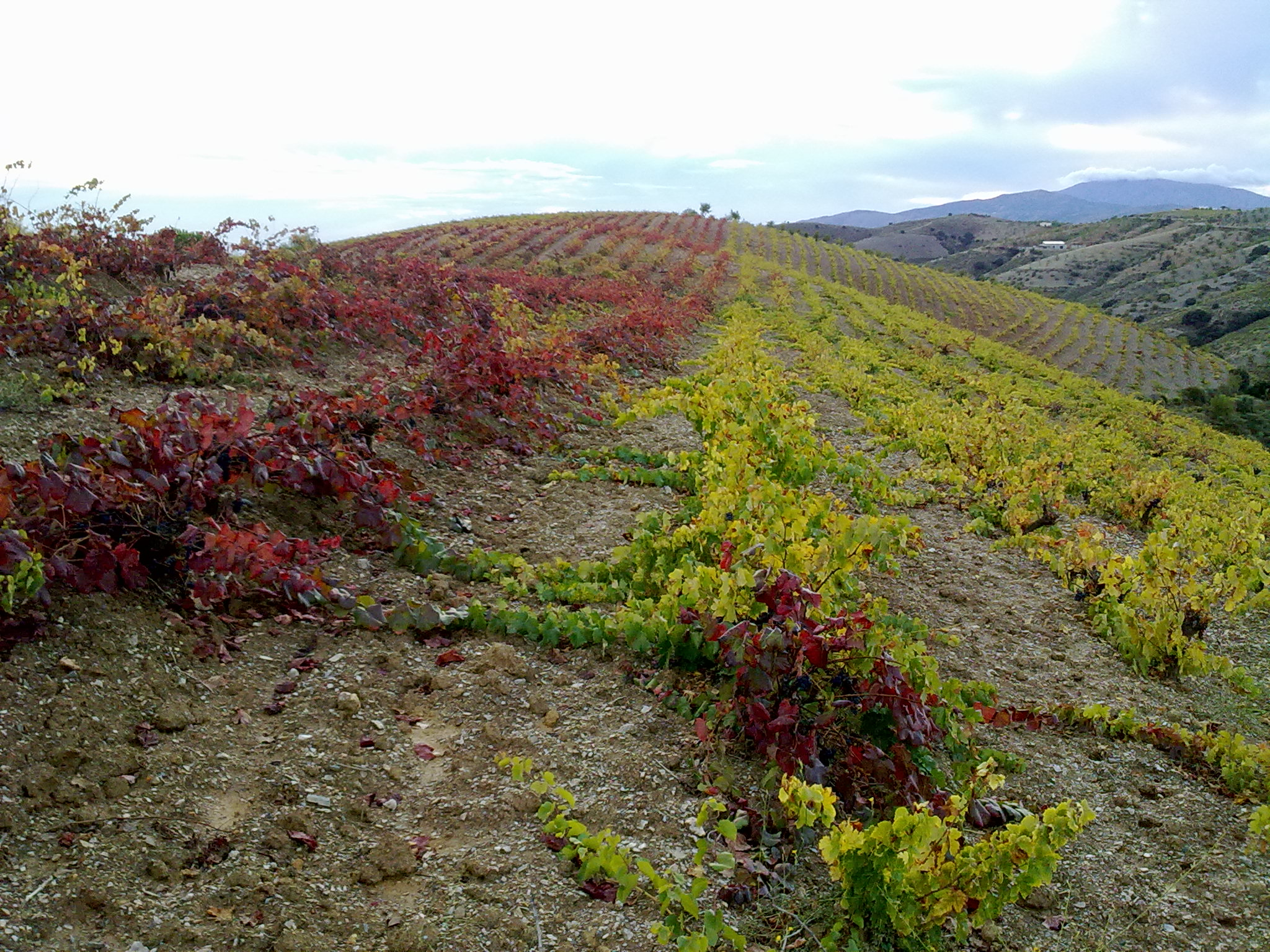
Vineyard near Murtas in the Province of Granada

Granada is a Spanish Denominación de Origen Protegida (DOP) for wines in the province of Granada, Andalusia, Spain, extending over 168 different municipalities. There is also sub-zone known as "Contraviesa-Alpujarras", covering another 13 municipalities in the Alpujarras mountains. Granada achieved Vino de Calidad status in 2009, and Denominación de Origen status in 2018.

== History ==
The first evidence of winemaking in Granada is the remains of a Roman villa with a 'lagar' (grape crushing area) near the village of Molvizar.

== Climate ==
Over 50% of the territory of the province of Granada is at an elevation of over 1000 m above sea level, which means that the average temperatures are lower than in the rest of Andalusia; and so the growing cycle is delayed with bud-burst, veraisson and harvest all occurring later than usual, i.e. the harvest is usually between the end of August and beginning of October. The average annual temperature in the province of Granada is 15°–16 °C. The absolute maximum is 39 °C and the absolute minimum is −4 °C. Annual sunlight hours are 2,700# Average annual rainfall is 450 mm, with 70 days of rain.

== Soils ==
In general the soils are poor in organic matter, phosphorus and nitrogen. They tend to be not very deep and are easily eroded, though water retention is good.

== Authorised grape varieties ==
The authorised grape varieties are:

- Red: Tempranillo, Garnacha Tinta, Cabernet Sauvignon, Cabernet Franc, Merlot, Syrah, Pinot Noir, Monastrell, Romé, and Petit Verdot
- White: Vigiriega, Sauvignon Blanc, Chardonnay, Moscatel de Alejandría, Moscatel de grano menudo / Morisca, Pedro Ximénez, Palomino, Baladi Verdejo, and Torrontés
- Sparkling: Vigiriega, Sauvignon Blanc, Chardonnay, Moscatel de Alejandría, and Torrontés
