= Málaga and Sierras de Málaga =

Wine producing area in Spain

Coordinates: 36°43′10″N 4°25′12″W

Málaga DOP Sierras de Málaga DOP
- Wine region
- Málaga DOP and Sierras de Málaga DOP in the province of Málaga in the region of Andalusia
- Official name: D.O.P. Málaga; D.O.P. Sierras de Málaga
- Type: Denominación de Origen Protegida (DOP)
- Year established: 1932 (2001 for Sierras de Málaga DOP)
- Country: Spain
- No. of vineyards: 996 hectares (2,461 acres)
- No. of wineries: 40
- Wine produced: 11,602 hectolitres
- Comments: Data for 2016 / 2017 for Málaga and Sierras de Málaga DOPs

The 6 DOP wine regions in Andalusia (Spain)

Málaga and Sierras de Málaga are two different Spanish Denominaciones de Origen Protegidas (DOPs) for wines from the province of Málaga (Andalusia, Spain). First formed as one DOP in 1932, the Sierras de Málaga DOP was formed in 2001 and is in effect a sub-appellation of Málaga DOP.

== History ==
Although vines were probably first introduced by Phoenicians, who founded the city of Málaga, the first documented evidence of wine production in the region dates from the Low Roman Empire, and consists of a fermentation vat which was discovered in Cártama, a town about 30 km from Málaga.

During the centuries of Arab dominion over the Iberian Peninsula, there was a constant conflict between the tenets of the Koran, which prohibits the drinking of wine, and the tradition of drinking wine, which was long established by that time. Slowly, over time, the severe punishments (including the death penalty for being drunk) were replaced by fines (garima), which in turn were later replaced by taxes (qabäla) to be paid by wine-sellers.

When Málaga was reconquered after the Siege of Málaga (1487) by the Catholic Monarchs they encountered the following situation as described by Cecilio García de la Leña in his book Conversaciones Históricas Malagueñas:

"The first thing our Catholic Conquering Princes did to make this city happy, rich and prosperous was to establish a Fraternity of Vintners (Hermandad de Viñeros), to watch over the production of the local wines, which even during the times of Moorish domination, played no small part in commerce and in the prosperity of the subjects. They understood that the vineyards, in addition to increasing the contentment and prosperity of their beloved city, would also contribute in no small manner to the Royal Treasury, due to the quantity of merchandise that would be exported to other dominions."

Some years later, on 12 January 1502 in Seville, the Catholic Monarchs confirmed the creation of the Fraternity of Vintners by Royal Decree. The guild privileges were confirmed again by their daughter Joanna of Castile in 1513.

In 1791, Mr Gálves, the Spanish ambassador in St Petersburg, presented Catherine II of Russia with some cases of Málaga wine, and such was the pleasure she experienced that she exempted all shipments of wine controlled by the Fraternity of Vintners from Russian taxes.

This Fraternity continues to exist today in the shape of the Regulatory Body (Consejo Regulador) of the Denominación de Origen.

In 1806, by Royal Decree, the Málaga Vintners House and Company of Commerce was created (Casa y Compañía de Comercio de Viñeros de Málaga), whose duties included: "to prevent the adulteration of the merchandise expedited by the Company, by means of placing difficult to falsify marks on all vessels, casks or containers used to ship wine".

On 1 July 1900 the regulations of the Associated Guild of Producers and Exporters of Málaga Wine were published (Asociación Gremial de Criadores Exportadores de Vino de Málaga), whose purpose was to watch over the general interests of the wine trade, by issuing certificates, nominating arbiters and experts, and above all by guaranteeing the legitimate origin of the exported wines by means of official seals.

By request of the grape-growers and vintners guilds, on 8 September 1933 the Regulatory Body was formed and its statutes were approved on 20 October 1933. All the wines produced in this DOP now have to be subjected to an official analysis and report from the Qualification Committee (Comité de Calificación), on the basis of which the Regulatory Body will issue the corresponding certificate and numbered guarantee seals.

== Wines ==
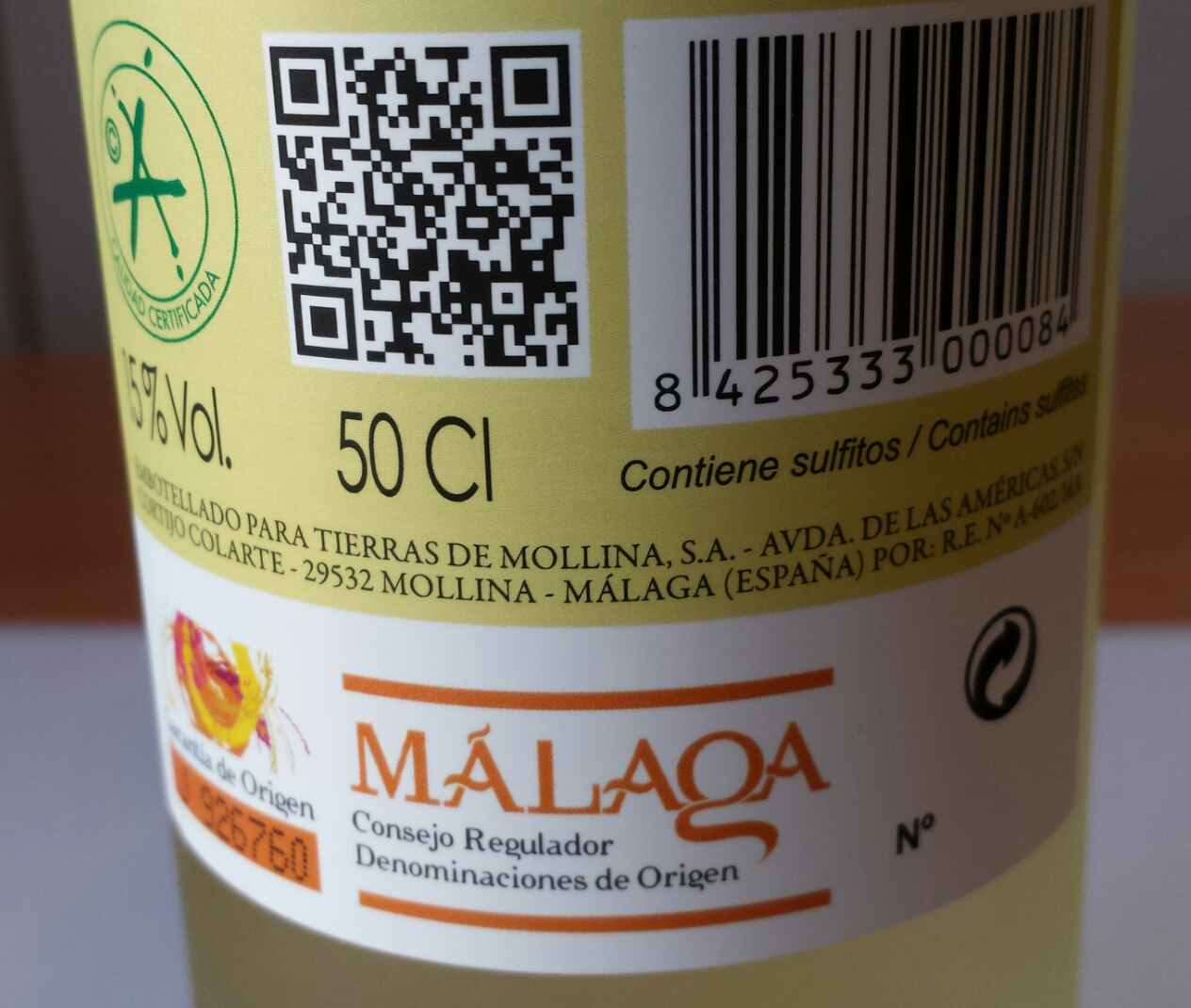
Official Málaga DOP label as found on the back of a wine bottle

The following types of wines are covered by the "Málaga" and "Sierras de Málaga" DOs:

- Málaga DO:
  - a. Fortified wines between 15% and 22% vol.
  - b. Natural sweet wines, at least 13% vol. produced from overripe grapes with the alcohol exclusively from the fermentation process.
- Sierras de Málaga DO: White, rosé and red wines less than 15% vol.

Traditionally, the sweet Málaga wine is produced by drying the grapes in the sun on mats before pressing them; in areas where raisin drying beds (paseros) are used: they consist of earth rectangles built on south or southwest facing slopes, with low white walls built around them. The grapes are commonly placed directly on the soil. Afterwards, fermentation is stopped in order to obtain a wine of between 15% and 22%.

The Vinos de Lágrima are made from Pedro Ximénez grapes which have been dried for one or two days and then sieved two or three times, but never pressed. The driest wines are produced from grapes that have not been exposed to the sun.

All ageing has to be done in Málaga in American oak barrels, with a capacity not exceeding 800 L.

== Soils ==
The soil is mostly alluvial with carbonates present on the surface, although near the coastline the composition is more varied, including clay, quartz and mica. There are five sub-zones in the DO:

- The North Zone (Zona Norte) is a high plateau in the far north of the province, between Antequera and the border with Córdoba, next to the Montilla-Moriles DO. The soils are mainly iron-bearing clay with a significant amount of lime.
- The Axarquía is a mountainous area to the east of the city of Málaga, and extends towards Nerja in the east and to the frontier of Granada in the north. There are about 8,000 ha under vines in this subzone in gravely lime-bearing soil.
- The West Coast (Costa Occidental) is a small area separate from the rest of the DOP to the west of Málaga and Marbella. It includes three coastal municipalities, Casares, Estepona and Manilva and the vineyards are on rocky soil on low hillsides along the coast.
- The Mountains (Los Montes), around the city of Málaga is formed by eight municipalities, including the western suburbs of the city itself. The soils are of slate, and at a high altitude even though they are close to the Mediterranean sea.
- Ronda, the latest addition in 2000, has the highest vineyards in this DOP at an altitude of about 750 m above sea level.

== Climate ==
The climate varies greatly from Mediterranean near the coast to Continental, with severe frosts, further inland.

The Axarquía has a temperate climate all year round with one of the lowest rainfall levels in Spain. The North Zone has very hot dry summers and cold winters, with the highest rainfall levels in the region.

The excessive heat during the summer is always a danger, although the vines are well adapted to resist drought. There is also the risk of summer downpours during the harvest period.

== Authorised Grape Varieties ==
The authorised grape varieties are:

- Málaga DOP
  - Red: Romé
  - White: Doradilla, Pero Ximén / Pedro Ximénez, Moscatel de Alejandría, and Moscatel Morisco / Moscatel de Grano Menudo
- Sierras de Málaga DOP
  - Red: Romé, Cabernet Sauvignon, Cabernet Franc, Garnacha Tinta, Merlot, Pinot Noir, Syrah, Tempranillo, Graciano, Malbec, Monastrell, Tintilla de rota, and Petit Verdot
  - White: Chardonnay, Gewürtztraminer, Riesling, Verdejo, Viognier, Pero Ximén / Pedro Ximénez, Macabeo, Sauvignon Blanc, Colombard, Moscatel de Alejandría, Moscatel Morisco / Moscatel de Grano Menudo Lairén, and Doradilla

The planting density varies between 800 and 5,000 vines/ha.
