= Malvar (grape) =

Variety of grape

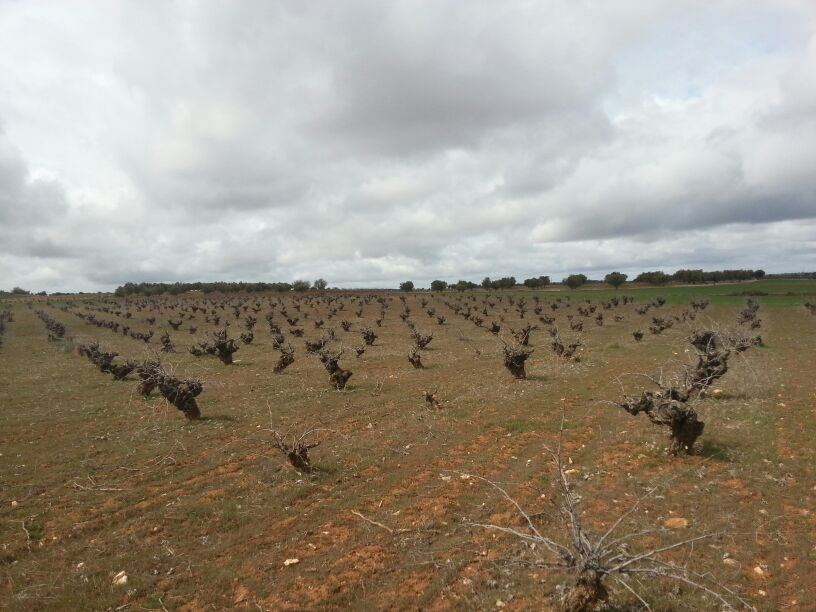
Old vine (over 100 years) vineyard planted to Malvar, in Villarejo de Salvanés (Madrid, Spain), at about 750 m above sea level

Malvar is a white Spanish wine grape variety that is predominantly grown in the province of Madrid where it is a permitted variety in the Denominación de Origen (DO) of Vinos de Madrid. In the late 20th century there was nearly 2,500 hectares (6,200 acres) of Malvar planted. According to wine expert Jancis Robinson, Malvar produces slightly "rustic", medium-bodied wines that tend to exhibit more aroma and flavor than Airén, which is also widely planted in Madrid. Spanish synonyms include Lairén.

== Wines ==
According to wine expert Jancis Robinson, malvar produces slightly "rustic", medium-bodied wines that tend to exhibit more aromas and flavors than airén, which is also planted in the Madrid region.

It produces aromatic young white wines, with a greenish color that changes to steely tones over time. It is used in the elaboration of overripe wines. It is suitable for blending with the tinto fino and garnacha varieties, giving smooth, velvety reds. It has potential for barrel aging and fermentation and for the production of liqueur wines in the style of Bordeaux sauternes. In the south of Madrid it can be blended with Macabeo to produce a wine in the style of the French Château d'Yquen.
