= Craft Irish Whiskey Company =

Drink company founded in 2018

The Craft Irish Whiskey Co.
- Company type: Private
- Industry: Alcohol
- Founded: 2018
- Founder: Jay Bradley
- Headquarters: Ireland
- Key people: Jay Bradley (Founder & CEO), Tiago Russo (Chief Design Officer) and Ian Duignan (Managing Director)
- Website: https://craftirishwhiskey.com/

The Craft Irish Whiskey Co. is an Irish whiskey producing company in Ireland. The company was formed in 2018 by Jay Bradley. In 2021, the Craft Irish Whiskey Co. became the most awarded new company of the year with a total of 32 awards in both taste and design categories for four of its whiskey releases.

== History ==
The Craft Irish Whiskey Co. was formed in 2018 by Jay Bradley.

The company first produced The Devil’s Keep, distilled in 1991 and launched in November 2020. It became the most expensive debut whiskey in history when a decanter sold at an auction for $60,000 in Texas. The second release by the company was The Emerald Isle, in collaboration with Fabergé, in February 2021. It sold for $2 million at an auction in the US in 2021. The Craft Irish Whiskey Co. donated all the proceeds from the first Emerald Isle box to the Correa Family Foundation, a charity supporting children affected by cancer.

The third release was The Brollach, which was distilled in 2001 and introduced in summer of 2021, followed by the fourth release of The Taoscán in October 2021.

== Varieties ==
- The Devil’s Keep – Triple distilled and triple casked in American, French and Hungarian Oak for flavour and aroma
- The Emerald Isle – A 30-year-old triple distilled single malt matured in an ex-bourbon barrel before being finished in a single Pedro Ximénez sherry barrel
- The Brollach - Double distilled and double casked in bourbon casks and finished in French Oak Madeira barrels
- The Taoscán - A Tawny Port & Chestnut whiskey, matured in American oak bourbon casks and Sherry Oloroso hogsheads, then split and finished in Tawny Port and Chestnut casks

== Awards ==
The Craft Irish Whiskey Co. won the Best Innovation category at the Best Business Awards in 2022. The company won Masters and Gold Medals at The Luxury Spirits Masters 2021 and also became the only whiskey to win Gold at the A’Design Awards 2021 and again in 2022, It also won a perfect score and Platinum for The Emerald Isle.

The Devil’s Keep won Best Irish Single Malt whiskey in Ireland across all categories at The World Whiskies Awards in 2022. It also won a Gold at The A’Design Awards, a Gold medal from the IWSC Competition, a Gold from The Spirits Business Luxury Masters Awards and from the Luxury Packaging Awards.

The Taoscán and The Brollach won Silver and Bronze at The World Whiskies Awards 2022 in the Best Single Malt category, across all age categories. The company is the exclusive Michelin Plaque Distribution Partner for The Michelin Guide Star Revelation Great Britain and Ireland 2022.

Tiago Russo, the Chief Design Officer of The Craft Irish Whiskey Co., won the 2023 Kyoto Global Design Awards for Finn Whiskey Glass, The Aodh and The Donn in Industrial category.
