= Escanyavella =

Variety of grape

- Grape (Vitis)
- Color of berry skin: White
- Species: Vitis vinifera
- Origin: Catalonia
- Notable regions: Priorat

Escanyavella is a white Catalan wine grape variety planted primarily in DOQ Priorat. The name literally translates from Catalan as "old lady strangler" and coughing is often a common reaction to those who eat the raw grapes. While grown in small numbers in Priorat, there are a number of wineries that use it as part of their blends and one that makes a wine completely from the grape although.

It is a thick skinned grape with high acidity and is harvested later than other white varieties.

Despite not being an officially recommended grape for DOQ Priorat wine certification, there has been an effort recently by several cellars in the region to recuperate and revitalize this nearly lost grape.

Although it is grown in small quantities in the Priorat region, especially in Gratallops and Porrera, there are several wineries that already use it as part of their blends and one of them, Cal Batllet, which makes a wine entirely from the grape.

== Synonyms ==
It was thought that the Spanish grape, Merseguera and Escanyavella were the same grape, but DNA testing by 'The Catalan Institute of Wine' (INCAVI), has proven this supposed relation to be false and that Escanyavella is indeed its own, unique grape.

The grape has also been called, Escanavella.
