= Paxarette =

Spanish vino de color

Paxarette, is the name of a Spanish sweet condensed vino de color wine made generally with Pedro Ximenez grapes and finished by mixing the wine with essences, called arrope or sancocho, which are produced by boiling must down to a fifth and a third respectively. Pajarete was popular as a straight dessert wine in England in the 18th century and gets its name from a monastery and vineyards situated near Arcos de la Frontera in the province of Cádiz in Andalusia southern Spain. Paxarette does not enjoy Protected Geographical Status.

In the past, the Scotch whisky industry made use of Paxarette to season casks, simply by pouring this rich flavouring into the wood, to help impart a fuller, richer sherry character into the whisky that was aged in them. Casks are conditioned by using pressure to force the paxarette to enter the upper layers of tired or spent sherry casks. As J.M. Philp describes in 1989, "..a typical current cooperage procedure in the Scotch whisky industry is to add 500ml of Paxarette per hogshead, or 1 litre per butt, pressurise at 48 kPa (7psig) for 10 min and then disgorge any unabsorbed Paxarette."
