= Alicante (DO) =

Coordinates: 38°44′13″N 0°16′28.76″W

Alicante DOP
- Wine region
- Alicante DOP in the province of Alicante in the region of Valencia
- Official name: D.O. Alicante
- Type: Denominación de Origen Protegida (DOP)
- Year established: 1932
- Country: Spain
- Size of planted vineyards: 10,379 hectares (25,647 acres)
- No. of wineries: 39
- Wine produced: 147,206 hectolitres
- Comments: Data for 2016 / 2017

Alicante is a Spanish Denominación de Origen Protegida (DOP) (Valencian: Denominació d'Origen) for wines located in the province of Alicante (Autonomous Community of Valencia).

There are two separate and distinct sub-zones: Vinalopó, which extends along the banks of the River Vinalopó in the southern area of the province, where the Monastrell grape variety and red wine production are predominant; and the smaller and newer sub-zone known as La Marina, along the coast in the northern area of the province, where the Moscatel grape variety and white wine production are predominant.

Alicante is most renowned for producing a traditional sweet dessert wine known as Fondillón, made from overripe grapes.

== History ==
Alicante has a long history of grape growing and wine production, which was probably introduced by the ancient Romans. The Golden Age of Alicante wines was during the 16th and 17th centuries, when they were imported to northern Europe by English, Swedish and Flemish merchants. In 1510 a royal decree prohibited the importation of wine into the province of Alicante while local wine was produced there.

The town of Monòver was internationally renowned in the 16th century for its Fondillón wine.

== Soils ==
The soils are mainly dark lime bearing soils on subsoils of sedimentary rock. By the Vinalopó banks, they are quite loose and sandy with almost no organic material present.

== Climate ==
The climate in the coastal Marina sub-zone is Mediterranean, while the climate in the Vinalopó subzone starts off Mediterranean becoming progressively more continental further inland. In La Marina maximum temperatures in summer are around 30°C and the average minimum in winter is around 13°C, with occasional frost. In the Vinalopó, highs in summer are around 35°C and lows in winter around 5°C, with frequent frost.

Rainfall is slightly above 500 mm/year in La Marina but scarce in the Vinalopó, only at around 300 mm/year.

== Grapes ==
As in other grape growing regions in Valencia region, Monastrell is the predominant variety, though Garnacha and Merseguera are also present.

Due to the heat in summer the vines are planted as low bushes (en vaso).

The authorized grape varieties are:

- Red: Monastrell, Garnacha Tintorera / Alicante Bouschet, Garnacha Tinta / Gironet, Bobal, Cabernet Sauvignon, Merlot, Pinot Noir, Petit Verdot, Syrah, Tempranillo.
- White: Moscatel de Alejandría, Airén, Subirat Parent / Malvasía, Chardonnay, Macabeo, Merseguera, Planta Fina de Pedralba, Sauvignon Blanc, Verdil.
