= Forcallat tinta =

Variety of grape

Forcallat tinta is a red Spanish wine grape variety that is native to the Castile-La Mancha region of central Spain, as well as in Alicante and Valencia provinces in the Valencian Community. The name of the cultivar means "forked" in Valencian, which probably refers to the bunches having a wing or shoulder, rather than a tendency to produce forked vines as suggested by Favà. It tends to produce pale-colored wines and is most often used as a minor blending component in Vino de la Tierra (VdlT) wines. It is an authorized variety in the Comunitat Valenciana, where it has become almost extinct and only a few wine makers like Rafael Cambra are making efforts to recover it, with interesting proposals like La forcallà d'Antònia. Extant plots are found in Fontanars dels Alforins, La Font de la Figuera, Villena and probably Moixent, though the cultivar was once a prevailing one in La Vall d'Albaida and Alto Vinalopó regions. Bodega la Encina in Villena (Alicante) with vineyards in neighbouring Almansa (Albacete) also works with the variety, offering wines from biodynamic and organic farming. DNA profiling conducted in the early 21st century determined that the white berried Forcallat blanca grape is a distinct variety and not a color mutation of Forcallat tinta. The white cultivar Trepadell is also called Forcallat blanc in the village of La Font de la Figuera, with only one remaining plot of about 600 plants. Trepadell is also present in the Marina Alta region and has been elaborated by Curii uvas & vinos.

== Viticulture ==
The Castilla-La Mancha region.

Forcallat tinta is a late-ripening grape variety that is often one of the last varieties to be harvested in a growing season. The vine can be very vigorous, producing a large canopy that needs to be kept in check by the vineyard manager or else quality development of the grape clusters can suffer. The vine produces upright shoots like monastrell, with five-lobed leaves which are pubescent underneath. Clusters are long-conical, medium to big-sized, with a characteristic wing, loose to somewhat tight, and berries are dark red to black, round and biggish compared with the medium wine variety.

== Relationship with other grapes ==
Forcallat tinta shares several synonyms with other grape varieties including the Cava wine grape Macabeo and the numerous other varieties that have been known under the synonym Verdal including Verdejo and Palomino. Forcallat blanca grape that is often confused for the white Spanish wine grape Airén was once thought to be a color mutation of Forcallat tinta but DNA profiling has shown that the two are actually distinct varieties.

== Wine regions ==
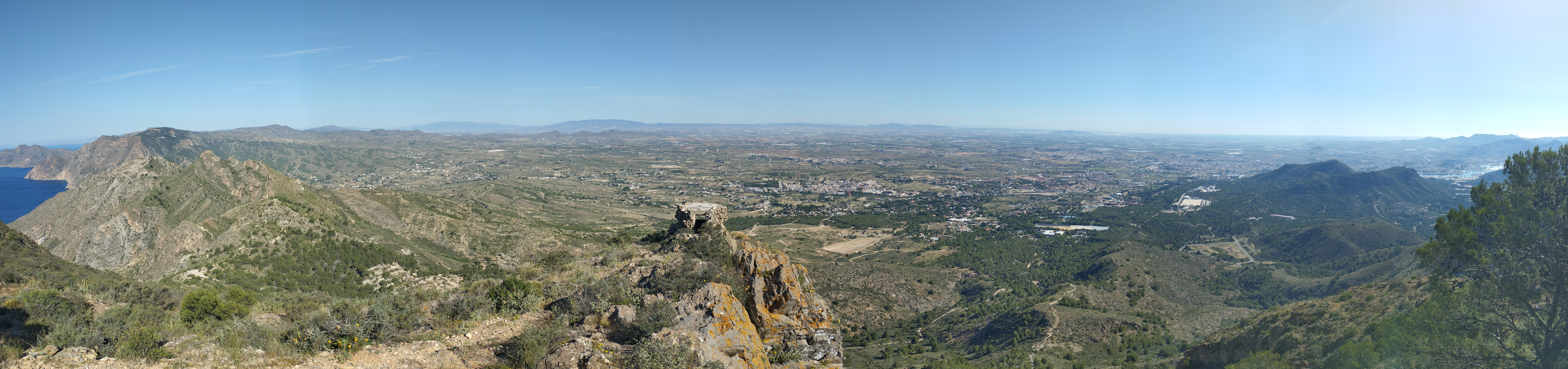
The Campo de Cartagena region in the province of Murcia where Forcallat tinta can be used in the production of the area's VdlT wines.

In 2008 there were 930 hectares (2,300 acres) of Forcallat tinta planted in Spain, mostly in the provinces of Murcia and Valencia. It is an authorized grape in the VdlT wines of Abanilla, Campo de Cartagena and El Terrerazo.

== Synonyms ==
Over the years, Forcallat tinta has been known under a variety of synonyms including: Alcabril de Gualadín (in the province of León), Alibril, Forcala, Forcalla, Forcalla negra, Forcalla noire, Forcalla Prieta, Macabeo, Macabeu, Verdal (in the province of Ourense), Verdalejo (in Murcia), Forcallà and Planta forcallà in Valencia and Verdalla (in the Canary Islands).
