= Valdepeñas (DO) =

Coordinates: 38°46′N 3°24′W

Valdepeñas DOP
- Wine region
- Valdepeñas DOP in the province of Ciudad Real in the region of Castile-La Mancha
- Official name: D.O.P Valdepeñas
- Type: Denominación de Origen Protegida (DOP)
- Year established: 1932
- Country: Spain
- Size of planted vineyards: 21,832 hectares (53,948 acres)
- No. of wineries: 17
- Wine produced: 616,017 hectolitres
- Comments: Data for 2016 / 2017

Valdepeñas is a Spanish Denominación de Origen Protegida (DOP) for wines located in the province of Ciudad Real in the south of Castile-La Mancha (Spain). It is almost completely surrounded by another DOP (La Mancha) but is an independent DOP due to its long history of producing a distinct style of wine known aloque or clarete which is made by mixing white and red grapes. 2016´s harvest is formed from 55.9 million kilograms of red grapes and 43.2 million kilograms of white grapes.

Valdepeñas is a natural crossroads between the south of Spain, the Mediterranean regions to the east, Extremadura to the west and central plains to the north. To the south of the DOP is the Sierra Morena range a natural frontier with Andalusia, and to the east and west there are mountains reaching a height of 1000 m. The most prized vineyards are in Los Llanos in the west and in Las Aberturas in the north. The total area planted to vines is 22,332.11 ha (2016).

== History ==
Grape growing and wine production in the area was practiced by the ancient Iberians and by the ancient Romans. During the Moorish era the area became an important wine producing centre, due to a special concession from the Caliphate of Toledo. After the Reconquest by Christian forces there was a huge increase in demand and in production, and wine began to be shipped further afield to cities such as Madrid. Towards the end of the 18th century annual production was around 200,000 arrobas (3.2 million litres). Fermentation was carried out in enormous earthenware vats (with capacities of up to 1,600 litres) which were partially buried in the ground to help keep the temperature down. During the winter months the lees would fall to the bottom naturally and it was not necessary to clarify the wine.

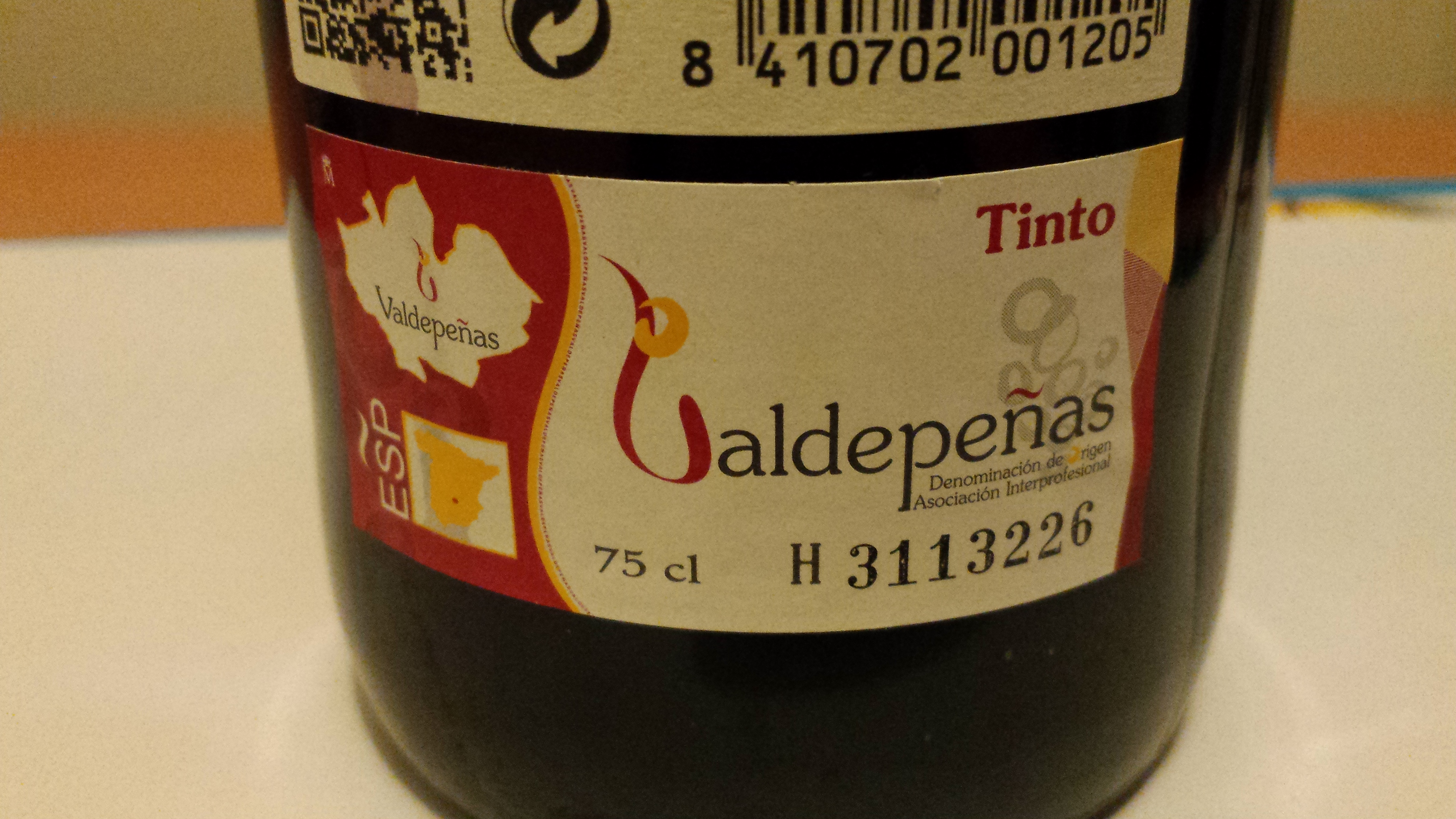
DO Valdepeñas

In 1861 a railway line connected Valdepeñas to the coast and there was a further large increase in wine production this time for export abroad, especially to the Philippines and to South America. In 1895 the ‘Wine Train’ (tren del vino) began to ship wine to Madrid. In 1911 the phylloxera plague destroyed the vineyards, but the producers of the area were able to save their industry by grafting new varieties of grapes (especially Airén) onto phylloxera-resistant New World rootstocks. This moment of crisis forced the different producers to cooperate with each other and a regional federation was formed, which was subsequently transformed into the Regulatory Council of the DOP. Official DO status was granted in 1932.

== Climate ==
The climate is extreme continental (very hot summers and cold winters) and can be classified as semi-arid. Temperatures can reach 40°C in summer and drop to -10°C in winter. Droughts in summer are frequent, as are frosts in winter. Rainfall is sparse and generally falls in spring and autumn often in the form of violent storms. The risk of hailstones and strong winds is significant in spring.

== Soil ==
The DOP is located on a plateau surrounded by hills and whose soil has a high lime content, over a subsoil of calcium carbonate, with good moisture retaining properties. The topsoil is not deep and quite pebbly, dark red in color with a high lime content, which often forms hard crusty layers which have to be broken to help the roots penetrate. The soil is poor in organic matter.

== Grape Varieties ==
The authorised varieties are:

- Red: Tempranillo / Cencibel, Garnacha, Cabernet Sauvignon, Merlot, Syrah, and Petit Verdot
- White: Airén, Macabeo, Chardonnay, Verdejo, Sauvignon blanc, and Moscatel de Grano Menudo

== Vines ==
The Airén variety was extensively planted after the phylloxera plague of 1911 due to its good resistance to high temperatures. As a result of this Airén makes up 65% of all vines planted in the area, although in recent years this percentage has been steadily declining. Other varieties, such as Macabeo, are also being used for white wines. Tempranillo (or Cencibel as it is known in the area) is the traditional variety used for red wines, although recently new varieties, such as Cabernet Sauvignon and Garnacha, are being used more. The vines are almost all planted in square or rectangular formation to allow mechanisation of the vineyard activities, and some newer plantations are on trellises to allow an increase in production.

== Wines ==
The majority of wines produced fall into the following four categories: young whites, young rosés, young reds, all made for consumption within one year. Some Crianzas, Reservas and Gran reserves are also produced.
