= Monterebro =

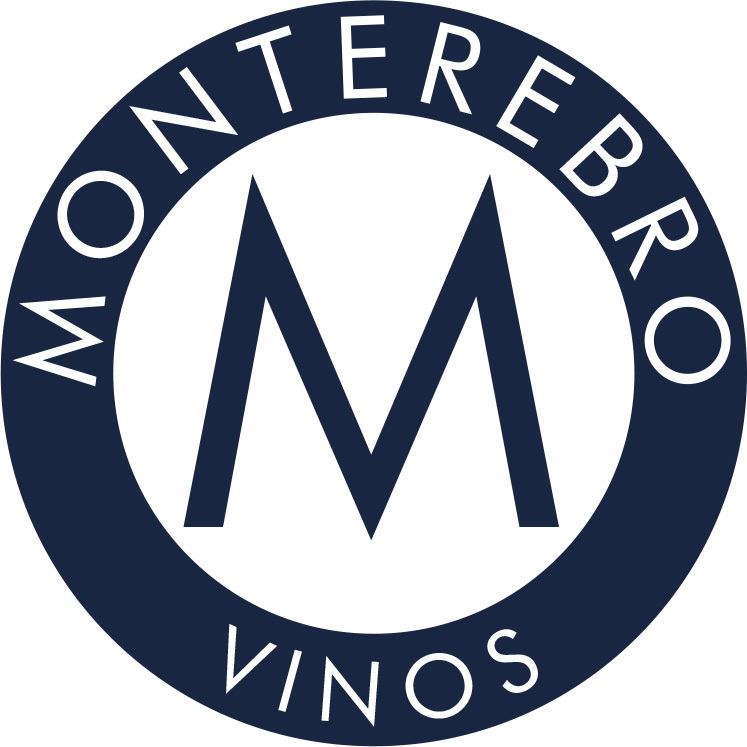
Monterebro Wines (D.O.P. Jumilla)

Monterebro is a Spanish wine producer. and range of Spanish wines produced in D.O.P. Jumilla, which is located in the Mediterranean wine-producing region of Murcia, in South East of Spain.

The brand was created in 2009 by CEO Jonathan Burrows, commercial manager Andrés Bastida Molina, and winemaker Juan Miguel Benítez; and is a registered trademark of Spanish corporation Burrows Investment Group, S.L.

There are six Monterebro wine products:

Monterebro Joven, Monterebro Barrica, Monterebro Crianza, Monterebro Selección, Monterebro Blanco, and Monterebro Rosado

The vineyards grow four main grape varieties used in the production of Monterebro wines: Monastrell, Syrah, Tempranillo, and Sauvignon Blanc. Monterebro's vineyards cover 17 hectares of unirrigated land between 700 and 800 metres above sea level which is subject to large temperature changes during the growing season. The vineyards are 14 to 65 years old, producing low yields.

The products are available in: Belgium, Canada, Denmark, England, Ireland (Republic of), Luxembourg, Mexico, the Netherlands, New Zealand, Spain, Sweden, Turkey, and the United States.
