= Bullas (DO) =

Coordinates: 38°03′00″N 01°40′12″W

Bullas DOP
- Wine region
- Bullas DOP in the region of Murcia
- Official name: D.O.P. Bullas
- Type: Denominación de Origen Protegida (DOP)
- Year established: 2007
- Country: Spain
- Size of planted vineyards: 1,811 hectares (4,475 acres)
- No. of wineries: 10
- Wine produced: 17,623 hectolitres
- Comments: Data for 2016 / 2017

Bullas is a Spanish Denominación de Origen Protegida (DOP) for wines located in the region of Murcia (Spain) and covers the territories of eight different municipalities, including Caravaca de la Cruz, Moratalla and Bullas itself. The region is renowned for its young reds and rosés made from the Monastrell grape variety.

== History ==
The town of Bullas has existed since the times of the ancient Romans and grew during the centuries of Moorish dominion of the Iberian Peninsula. After its reconquest by Christian forces in the 13th century its prosperity increased due to agriculture and wine production.

The region used to produce wine in bulk until the 1980s when private wineries began to invest in the equipment and technology required for the production of bottled and labelled quality wine. It acquired official DO status in 1994.

== Geography ==
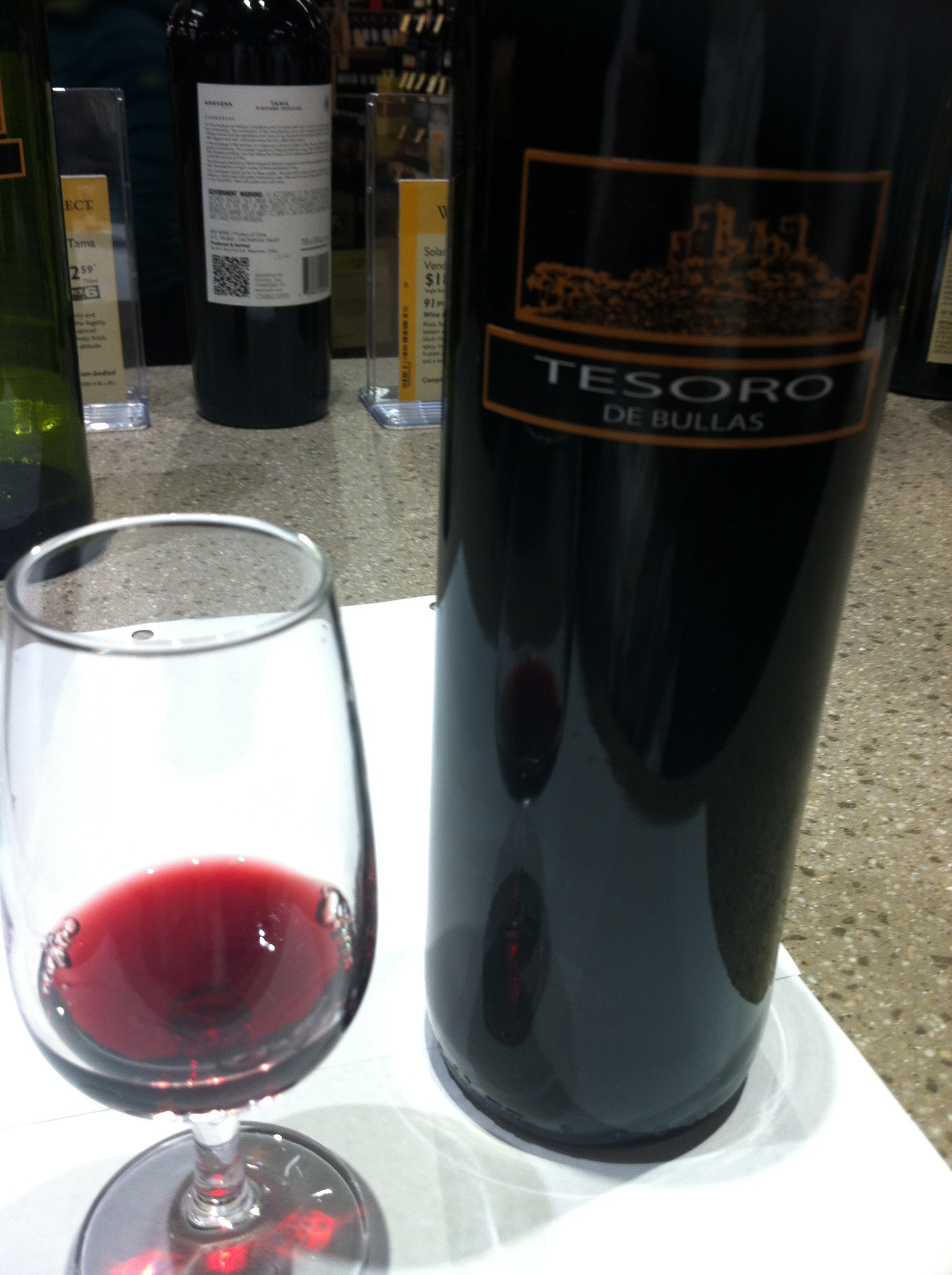
A Monastrell (also known as Mourvedre) from Bullas.

Bullas is located halfway between the city of Murcia, the regional capital, and the mountains in the west that form the frontier with Andalusia. The landscape is rugged and slopes upwards from south to north. It comprises numerous small valleys with individual microclimates.

The soils on the slopes are brown and so hard that they have to be broken mechanically before vines can be planted. They are lime bearing and have a top crust, poor in organic matter, and have good drainage.

The DOP is divided into 3 sub-zones, each one of which has a distinct identity and produces characteristic wines.

=== Northwest ===
The Northwest sub-zone is the most important one in terms of area (52%), number of wineries and quality of the wine. It is located in the foothills of the mountains at altitudes between 500 and 800 m (1,600 and 2,600 ft) above sea level. It includes the municipalities of Caravaca de la Cruz, Moratalla and part of Lorca. The main grape varieties used in this sub-zone are Monastrell and Tempranillo.

=== Central ===
The Central sub-zone covers 40% of the DOP, is at an altitude of between 500 and 600 m (1,600 and 2,000 ft) above sea level and includes the municipalities of Mula, Bullas and Cehegín.

=== Northeast ===
The Northeast sub-zone, the smallest of the three, covering only 8% of the DOP includes the municipalities of Calasparra, Ricote, Bullas and Mula.

== Climate ==
The climate in Bullas DOP is characterised by its very hot summers, though not as hot as the other DOPs in Murcia. There are occasional freezing winds from the mountains and frosts are common between the months of October and April. The average temperature is 16 °C with maximums of 39 °C in summer and minimums of −4 °C in winter. There are also occasional violent storms in September and October.

== Grapes ==
The main grape variety planted is Monastrell which represents over 80% of all grapes planted.

- Red grape varieties: Monastrell, Cabernet Sauvignon, Garnacha Tinta, Syrah, Tempranillo, Merlot, Petit Verdot.
- White grape varieties: Airén, Chardonnay, Macabeo, Malvasía, Moscatel de Alejandría, Sauvignon Blanc, Moscatel de Grano Menudo.
