= Fondillón =

Alicante-produced wine in Spain

Fondillón is a special style of wine produced in the Alicante D.O. in Spain. Fondillón is a red wine produced in an oxidised (rancio) style from overripe Monastrell grapes, and is typically semi-sweet. Its alcohol level is similar to many fortified wines, although Fondillón is not fortified.

Fondillón is typically bottled and sold after an extended period of aging in barrel (minimum 10 years). It can either be vintage-dated or come from a solera.

Common pairings include cheese, in particular blue cheese, as well as chocolate and chocolate-based desserts.
