= Macisvenda =

Town in Spain

Coordinates: 38°15′N 1°01′W

Macisvenda is a village in the municipality of Abanilla, in the autonomous community of Region of Murcia, Spain. It lies close to the border of the province of Alicante in the Autonomous Community of Valencia.

In 2009, Macisvenda had 634 inhabitants, while in 2011, the population grew to 657 people.

== History ==
No information about the origin of this hamlet of Abanilla until 1750 that appears in the cadastre of the Marqués de la Ensenada with Macilvenda name. He was also known as Macilbenda or Macirbenda until finally the present name was adopted as the official of Macisvenda.

== Climate and topography ==
Macisvenda climate characterized by warm summers and mild winters that favor the large amount of scrub that occurs in their places. Part of the town is very flat and the other uneven, with many houses built on small elevations, as with the stand down. Although it is a land with mountains where conifers and date palms can be found, there are olive trees, almond trees and above all, vineyards. The grapes of the whole area is intended to produce the wine, which is then sold in the same village and part of the province of Alicante . Macisvenda also has mountains and hills with pine and albardín esparto. The esparto was a major source of income and activities of these people.

== Religion ==
Macisvenda was part of the parish of Barinas (hamlet of Abanilla near Macisvenda) for many years. Finally in the early twentieth century was built the chapel dedicated to San Juan Bautista, which provided its own area Macisvenda religious and liturgical. In 1996, the chapel was raised to parish Macisvenda, independent from the neighboring church of Barinas. The church of Macisvenda is located at the top of the hamlet, near the road to Barinas.

=== Festivities ===
The local festivities of this hamlet are made in honor of its patron San Juan Bautista and celebrate the end of August, being the day of the patron and the more party on 29 August to celebrate the day of the Beheading of St. John Bautista.

== Village headman ==
Below is a table of the last village headman of Macisvenda since 1988: Mandate Name of village headman Political party 1988–1991 Isidoro Torah Riquelme Party 1991–1995 Isidoro Torah Riquelme Party 1995–1999 José Carlos Pacheco Atienza Party 1999–2003 José Carlos Pacheco Atienza Party 2003–2007 José Carlos Pacheco Atienza Party 2007–2011 Juan Ruiz Ruiz Party 2011 – Juan Ruiz Ruiz Party
