= Fuente-Álamo =

Coordinates: 38.69318°N 1.43170°W

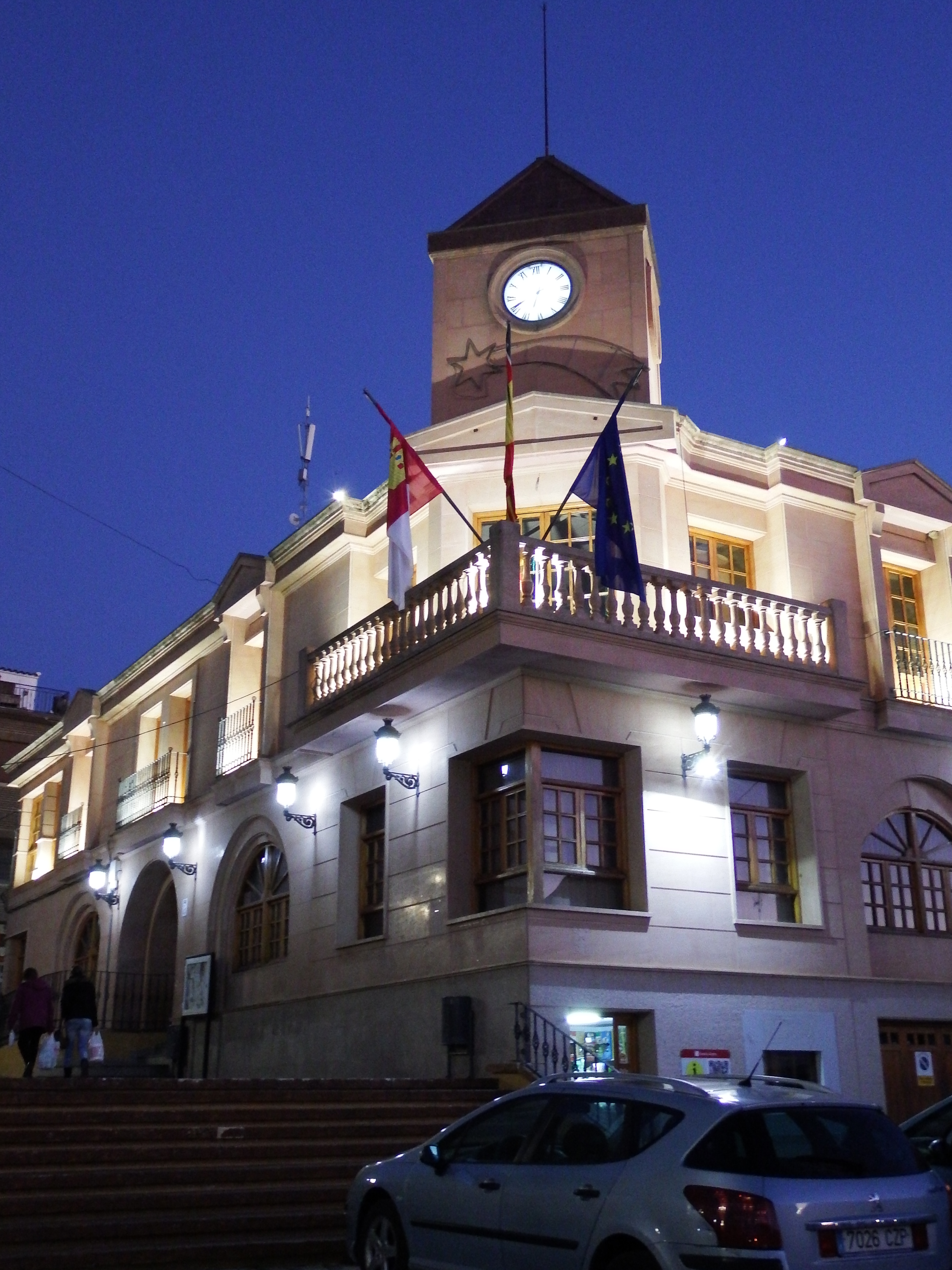

Coat of arms of Fuente-Álamo

Fuente-Álamo is a municipality in Albacete, Castile-La Mancha, Spain. It lies 61 km (37.9 mi) from the provincial capital and had a population of 2,639 as of 2011.

== Etymology ==
According to tradition, the name Fuente-Álamo ("poplar spring") comes from a nearby spring located near a poplar that no longer stands.

== Geography ==
Fuente-Álamo lies in the southeastern part of Albacete province at 800 m (2624.67 ft) above sea level.

== History ==
The first settlers of the area lived in caves in nearby mountains or small, fragile dwellings. Neolithic ruins have been found in Las Colleras, El Mainetico, and El Mainetón neighborhoods. Celtiberian and Roman ruins, in addition to their Neolithic counterparts, have been found on nearby Mount Fortaleza.

The first written records of Fuente-Álamo date to 1265, when the site was part of the fiefdom of Alpera and was named for its renowned springs ("Fuentes de Alamo"). In 1269, the area became the village of Chinchilla de Monte-Aragón within the Seigneury of Villena, owned by the family of Manueles de Villena. At that time, Fuente-Álamo became pastureland and saw the first influx of shepherds. The creation of the Marquessate of Villena united Chinchilla and Fuente-Álamo, and they stayed united when the Spanish crown assumed control in 1480, in the wake of a peasant revolt against the marquess Diego López Pacheco y Portocarrero.

By the 16th century, there was already a small village with a hermitage and cemetery, none of which remain. In the mid-18th century, the site of present-day Fuente-Álamo passed to the Region of Murcia, only to become part of the short-lived Province of Chinchilla in 1823, which lasted only a year. In 1833, the current Province of Albacete was established, and that same year Fuente-Álamo was chartered a town. 19th-century mayor Miguel López del Castillo Tejada favored agriculture and therefore gave up significant portions of the town, shifting the city's center toward the neighborhood of Cerrón. The Diccionario de Madoz (Dictionary of Madoz, 1845-1850) includes the following entry on Fuente-Álamo in the mid-19th century:

Self-governing town in the province...of Albacete (8 leagues)...LOCATED on a northern hillside...has 280 houses, 250 within the town limits and the rest on the outskirts; a small public inn; a primary school...a spring with two channels that deliver enough water to not only serve the citizens' drinking and household needs but also quench the thirst of the local cattle and water the mayor's garden; there is a local parish church dedicated to Saint Dionysius the Areopagite...and on the edge of town is a cemetery quite small for the town's size...Nearby villages and hamlets include Agrio, Casa de la Peña de Cerezos, Casa nueva del Cabañil, Casa de la Parra de Lorente, Casa de las Liebres, Cepero, Cerro en Medio, Chortales, Huesas, Jaraba, Mainetes, Mojon de Ontur, Olimillo, Regajo, Tejarejo, and Villacañas...The TERRAIN includes some plains with sedges, rooted in good-quality soil thanks to several irrigation ditches...the rest of the area is mountainside overgrown with esparto, rosemary, Kermes oak, rockrose, and other shrubs, with some pine groves and remnants of the holly oaks that, while heavily cut since the Peninsular War, remain important sources of lumber, firewood, and charcoal. TRANSPORTATION: Local roads, including horsepaths, highways, and sidewalks, are all in good condition. AGRICULTURE: wheat, rye, barley, oats, wine, olive oil, saffron, esparto, strawberry trees, ample hay, honey, and beeswax; sheep and goats are raised, as are draft horses; hunting of partridge, rabbit, and hare; some pests, such as wolves and foxes. INDUSTRY: the primary one is agriculture; reprocessing of esparto in various handicrafts, charcoal, manufacturing of lime and tile, two conventional cloth and canvas looms, and other vital crafts. COMMERCE: exports of livestock, saffron, esparto, and surplus fruit; imports of needed consumer goods; two grocers supply the town. POPULATION: 284 households, 1244 people.

Since the 1960s, the town has experienced the fastest population growth in its history.

== Economy ==
The town's economy is predominantly agricultural. The hot, arid climate lends itself to viticulture and olive growing, and to a lesser extent to the cultivation of barley, oats, and almonds. Although the area isn't recognizably pastoral, livestock are raised alongside crops. Sheep and goats are dwindling in number as the wool market shrinks and pasture lands become scarcer. Pork, however, is a growth industry here.

Industry is growing at an impressive rate, and the community is reaping the benefits. The local vintners almost all belong to the Cooperativa Vitivinícola San Dionisio (San Dionisio Vintners and Grape Growers Cooperative). Founded in 1957, the co-op has grown rapidly and releases its wines on the national market through the Jumilla Denomination of Origin. The local dairy industry, initiated in 1987 for local consumption, has grown enough to market nationally as well. The furniture and shoe industries are recent arrivals, courtesy of plants in nearby Yecla and Almansa.

Since the 1960s, students from the Earth Science faculty from the Vrije Universiteit Amsterdam (VU) have been visiting the town for its well-expressed geological outcrops.

== Public services ==
The town has a clinic and an indoor recreational center with a pool.

== Historic sites ==
- St. Dionysius the Areopagite's Church: The neoclassical parish church was designed in the 18th century by architect Lorenzo Alonso Franco. The church was consecrated in 1798. The foundation and lower parts are ashlar, but the upper areas are built in mampostería, the traditional dry stonework of the region. The modest facade features only a few angels over the doorway lintel, each bearing one of Dionysius's traditional emblems: the crosier, the palm, the book, and the mitre. A rectangular bell-tower tops off the structure. The church plan is an unusual nave covered with a cannon vault, with chapels nestled in the walls between Ionic columns. The flamboyant semicircular apse peaks in a dome, which was painted in 1954 with a fresco of the Assumption of Mary by Manuel Muñoz Barberán. Two doors open from each side of the altar, each leading from the apse to a separate sacristy. Each of these doors has medallions of the Annunciation and the Visitation painted on it.
- Las Colleras: 7 km (4.35 mi) west of the center of town, in the eponymous mountains, lie a series of clefts (popularly known as toriles) in limestone cliffs. Here, archaeologists have found Neolithic dwellings, complete with tools from the period sandstone ready for quarrying.
- Cerro Fortaleza: This hill is located 3 km (1.864 mi) south of town. At the summit are the ruins of a large fort where Neolithic, Celtiberian, and Roman artifacts have been found. The Neolithic sites include weapons made from sillimanite, a material not found in the region that implies the presence of trading networks.

== Culture ==
=== Festivals ===
- Patron Saint's Days: These are celebrated in honor of Saint Dionysius the Areopagite from October 8 to October 12. The festivities begin with the symbolic stomping of grapes in wooden barrels to make a wine offering for the patron saint, followed by an exhibition of regional dances.
- Holy Week: The Brotherhoods of Jesus the Nazarene, the Via Dolorosa, and Saint John all participate.
- Feast of Saint Mark: This is celebrated on April 25, with the making of traditional peasant lunch and dinner. The party continues into the next day, nicknamed San Marquicos. The lunch usually includes hornazo, a traditional pastry served with boiled eggs.
- Dance of the Gazpachos: This is celebrated on August 14, with the making of the best torta de Gazpacho in the province.
- Feasts of Saints Anthony and Blaise: It is customary to gather firewood and vine prunings as kindling, with which the family will burn useless or broken household objects at dusk on the eve of these saints' days, making bonfires in the streets. A popular expression recalling this practice goes: "La hoguerita de San Antón que nos guarde el chicharrón; y la de San Blas que nos guarde la 'tajá'" (We burn the pork rinds in Saint Anthony's fire, and the cuttings in Saint Blaise's).

=== Cuisine ===
The characteristic cuisine of Fuente-Álamo is rooted in the town's agrarian roots, brimming with strong, high-calorie dishes. The local specialty is the torta de Gazpacho, not to be confused with the Andalusian gazpacho. Though recipes vary, they all use flatbread. The torta de Gazpacho often includes game (rabbit, hare, partridge) and snail. Gazpacho viudo is made with potatoes, tomatoes, and peppers instead of meat. Another type of gazpacho viudo is made with bacon. Gazpacho con orugas is made with fresh arugula from the local fields and mountains. Another distinctive local dish is ajiharina, a porridge of flour, potatoes, and pieces of guarra, a regional sausage. Mataero porridge is common on pig slaughter days. This is made with flour or crackers and the pig's bacon and liver, often seasoned with a variety of spices. Mataero is often served on a bed of pine nuts. The ajibolo or mortared garlic shares the salt cod, potatoes, olive oil, and garlic of the standard atascaburras of La Mancha, but eschews the usual nuts. Gachasmigas, made with flour, potatoes, garlic, olive oil, water, and salt, is typical winter fare. In addition to these dishes, Fuente-Álamo produces its own goat cheese, now on a much larger scale than the home production of the past. Typical desserts include hornazo, arrope, butter cakes, flor frita, and sweetbreads.

== Fieldwork ==
From 1960 Fuente-Álamo is annually home of the first year Earth Science students from the VU (Vrije Universiteit Amsterdam). In May/June they visit the area to do their fieldwork. During their fieldwork they study the relationships between geology and geomorphology by making maps, cross-sections and lithological columns.

== Bibliography ==
- Auñón Rodríguez, B. Ricardo (1984). Fuenteálamo: ayer y hoy. Albacete: Talleres Tip-Offset. ISBN 84-398-1699-5.
- Cerdán Milla, Antonio (2001). Fuenteálamo en verso. Albacete: Gráficas Ruiz. ISBN 84-607-3807-8.
- Palao García, María (1998). Fuente-Álamo: Un municipio frontera. Albacete Provincial Council. ISBN 84-89659-48-6.
