= La Marina =

Coastal village in Spain

Coordinates: 38°8′45″N 0°38′44″W

La Marina is a village in Eastern Spain on the Costa Blanca. It is located in the comarca of Baix Vinalopó, in the province of Alicante, Valencian Community.

La Marina adjoins Guardamar del Segura to the south, with the salt pans (salinas) of Santa Pola to the north. It is on the Costa Azul bus route which joins Alicante and Torrevieja along the N-332 highway.

Approximately 2 km inland of La Marina village is a larger settlement that consists of multiple developments (urbanisations) constructed since 1987. It is popularly called La Marina but is in fact part of the municipality of San Fulgencio.

== History ==
La Marina grew to become a village when settled by people from San Francisco de Asís in the Sierra del Molar hills to its west.

== Demography ==
As of 2009 La Marina had 2,093 inhabitants. Its population increased by 48% between 2000 and 2006.

== Economy ==
Historically orientated towards fishing and agriculture, nowadays the local economy focuses on sustainable tourism.

The Church of San Francisco de Asís was built in the late 19th century, as the ancient chapel which was built shortly after the disappearance of the eponymous village was too small. During the Spanish Civil War it was looted and turned into a barracks before being restored. It is a relatively small church consisting of one main nave and a chapel to each side. A ceramic altar stands in the presbytery bearing the image of Christ crucified. There are niches to each side with the images of the patron saints Saint Francis of Assisi and Our Lady of the Rosary.

== Holidays ==
Celebrations in honour of the patron saints of La Marina are held in late September and early October, consisting of such events as the charanga parade, the sopar del carabasset (pumpkin supper, a public festive meal), the procession, the mascletà and fireworks.

== Beaches ==
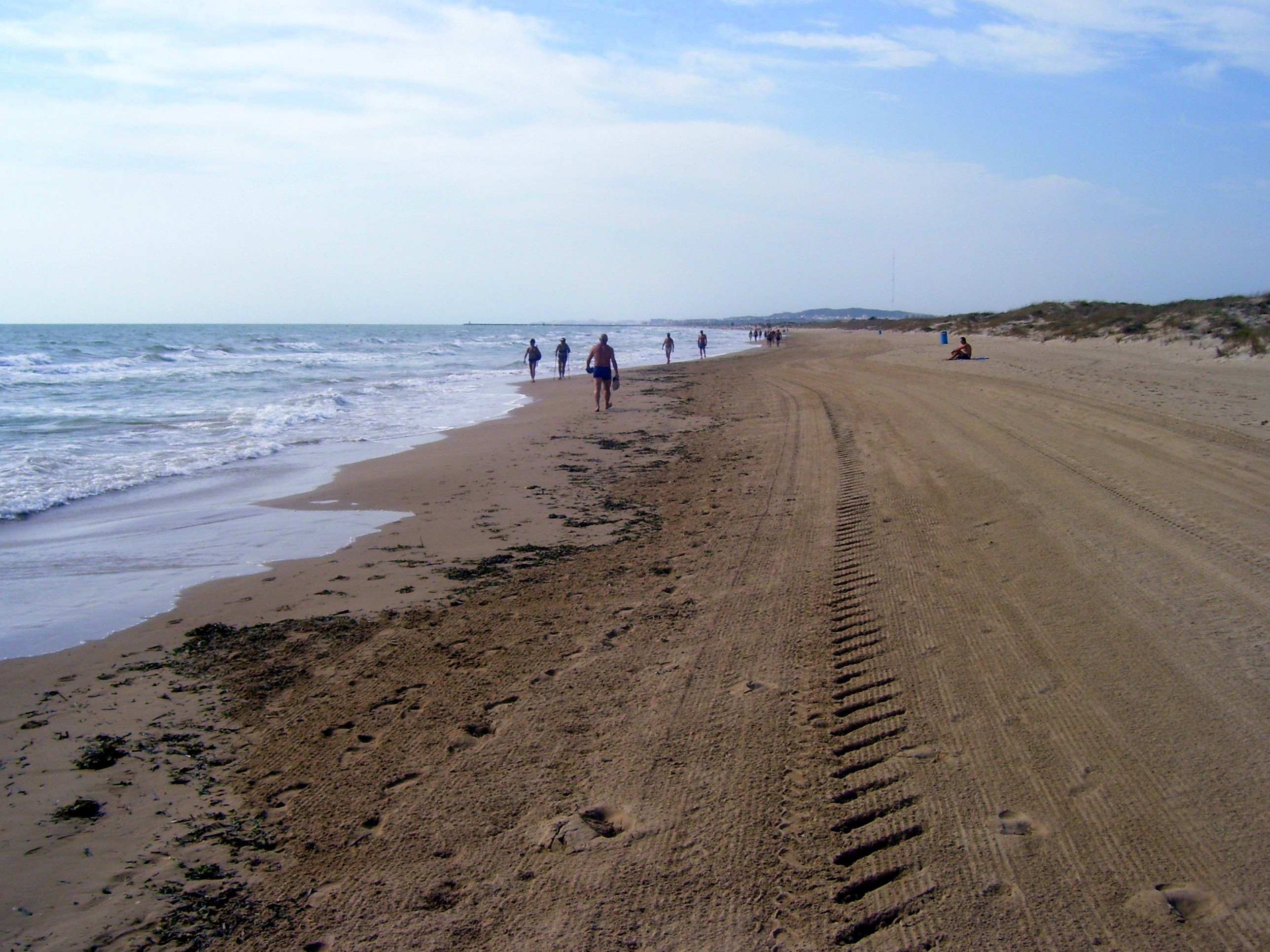
La Marina Beach

The main beach, directly beside the town, is called La Marina beach. It is a wide beach with fine golden sand. mainly bordered by scrub and sand dunes. It is a certified Blue Flag beach and has an area reserved for water sports.

El Pinet beach adjoins La Marina beach to the north, has a narrower strip of sand and is mainly bordered by buildings.
