= Vinos de Madrid =

Spanish wine producing area

Coordinates: 40°17′5″N 4°0′49″W

Vinos de Madrid DOP
- Wine region
- Vinos de Madrid DOP in the region of Madrid
- Official name: D.O.P. Vinos de Madrid
- Type: Denominación de Origen Protegida (DOP)
- Year established: 2003
- Country: Spain
- Sub-regions: Arganda, Navalcarnero and San Martín
- Size of planted vineyards: 8,860 hectares (21,894 acres)
- No. of wineries: 51
- Wine produced: 28,487 hectolitres
- Comments: Data for 2016 / 2017

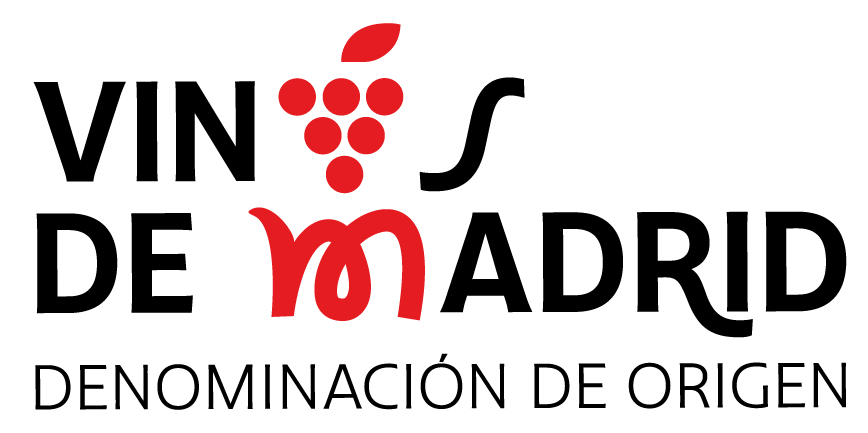
Vinos de Madrid DOP, logo

Vinos de Madrid is a Spanish Denominación de Origen Protegida (DOP), located in the southern part of the region of Madrid (Spain). It covers 54 municipalities and is divided into the three sub-zones (Arganda, Navalcarnero, and San Martín), each of which produce different types of wine.

== History ==
The ancient Romans likely introduced vines in the area as they did throughout the rest of the Iberian peninsula. However, the first documented evidence of wine production in the area dates from the 13th century. Legal documents indicate a dispute between some monks and a local feudal lord over the ownership of a vineyard.

Vinos de Madrid acquired its DO status in 1990.

== Geography and Soils ==
The three sub-zones are all at an elevation of between 500 and 800 m above sea level. Arganda is the largest sub-zone, containing about 50% of the vines and comprising 26 municipalities. The soil here contains mainly clay and lime over a granite subsoil. To the southwest, close to the Sierra de Gredos range, is the San Martín sub-zone, which contains 35% of the DOP's vines. Further to the southwest is the Navalcarnero sub-zone with 15% of the vines. Rich dark soils are more abundant in San Martín, while in Navalcarnero the soils lack carbonates, are low in nutrients, and lie over a clay subsoil.

== Climate ==
The four sub-zones of Vinos de Madrid DOP all have long, hot summers and cold winters, typical of a continental climate. Temperatures widely varies over the course of the year, from as high as 40 °C in summer and as low as -2 °C in winter. Rainfall varies depending on the sub-zone, but in general it is sparse and falls mainly in spring and autumn. San Martin gets the most rainfall (650 mm/year) due to the influence of the mountains, while Navalcarnero gets just over 500 mm/year, and Arganda just 450 mm/year. The risk of hailstones exists every year till around April.

== Authorised Grape Varieties ==
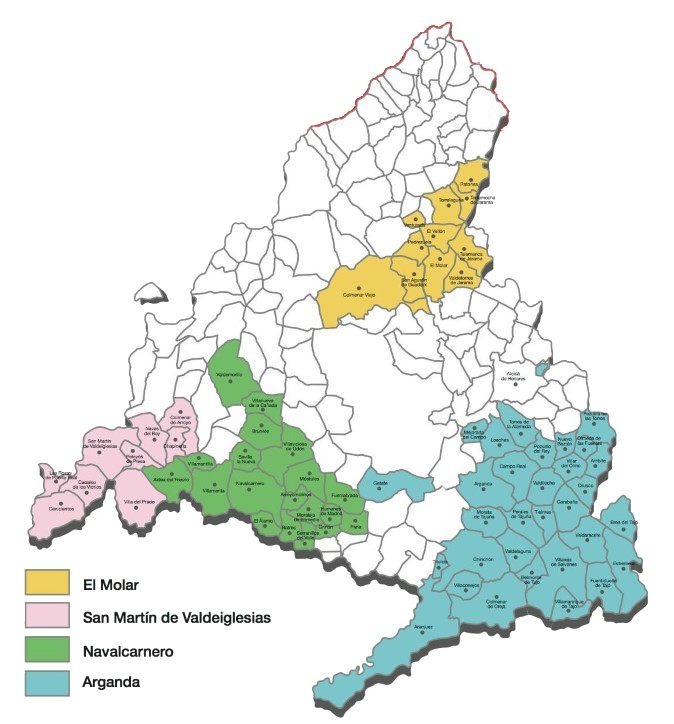
Vinos de Madrid DOP, sub-zones.

The authorised grape varieties are:

- Red: Garnacha Tinta Tinto Fino / Tempranillo are recommended, and also authorised are Cabernet Sauvignon, Graciano, Merlot, Negral / Garnacha Tintorera, Petit Verdot, and Syrah
- White: Albillo Real Malvar are recommended, and also authorised are Airén, Macabeo / Viura, Moscatel de Grano Menudo, Parellada, Torrontés / Alarije, and Sauvignon Blanc
