= Romé =

Variety of grape

Romé is a red wine grape grown mainly in the province of Málaga, in the region of Andalusia, Spain. Can also be found in the Sierra de la Contraviesa in the province of Granada. The berries are large and elongated. Also called Romé blanca and Romer.
