= Merseguera =

Variety of grape

- Grape (Vitis)
- Color of berry skin: Blanc
- Species: Vitis vinifera
- Also called: see list of synonyms
- Origin: Spain
- VIVC number: 7660

Merseguera is a white Spanish wine grape variety planted primarily in the Alicante, Jumilla and Valencia regions.

== Synonyms ==
Merseguera is also known under the synonyms Blanqueta, Blanquilla, Escanyagos, Exquitsagos, Exquitxagos, Gayata, Gayata Blanca, Lanjaron, Lanjaron Claro, Macaban, Macabeo Basto, Marisancha, Marisancho, Marseguera Masadera, Masaguera, Masseguera, Menseguera, Merseguera de Rio, Mersequera, Meseguera, Messeguera, Messeguera Comun, Mezeguera, Mezeyguera, Planta Borda, Planta de Gos, Trova, Uva Planta, Verdosilla, and Verema Blanca.
