= Abanilla =

- Municipality
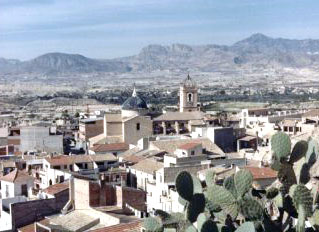

- Flag Coat of arms

- Location in Murcia

- Location in Spain. Abanilla (Spain)
- Country: Spain
- Province: Murcia
- Comarca: Comarca Oriental
- Established: 11th-12th century

Government
  - Mayor: Ezequiel Alonso Gaona (PSOE)

Area
  - Total: 236.6 km^{2} (91.4 sq mi)
- Elevation: 201 m (659 ft)

Population (2025)
  - Total: 6,256
  - Density: 26.44/km^{2} (68.48/sq mi)
- Post code: 30640 (Abanilla Town), 30648 (Barinas)
- Area codes: 968 and 868
- Website: www.abanilla.es

Abanilla is a Spanish municipality located in the Comarca Oriental (composed by Fortuna and Abanilla) in the Autonomous Community of Murcia. It lies close to the border of the province of Alicante in the Autonomous Community of Valencia.

== Geography ==
Abanilla occupies a surface area of 236.6 km^{2} and is situated 222 metres above sea level. It lies on a natural foundation which has been degraded by a number of aggregate and marble quarries.

=== Paleontological Significance ===
A karstic paleontological site is located on the southeast slope of the Sierra de Quibas in an abandoned limestone quarry. Researchers have discovered vertebrate and invertebrate fossils at this site. They collected rodent fossils and used dental patterns to identify these to be of the Muroidea subfamily Arvicolinae. Using stratigraphic and sedimentological features in the limestone, the scientists were able to date these fossils to the Early Pleistocene subepoch.

=== Points of interest ===
Points of interest in Abanilla include the Old Town (containing the monument to the Corazón de Jesús), the Fuente de Algarrobo (Fountain of the carob tree), the Santuario de Mahoya (Sanctuary of Mahoya), and the Iglesia Parroquial de San José (Parochial Church of St. Joseph). Other sights worth visiting include the source of the River Chícamo and the mountains of Abanilla and Quibas.

=== Monuments ===
Buildings of monumental significance in Abanilla include the La Iglesia de San José (the Church of San José) (18th century), El Sagrado Corazón (Sacred Heart) in Abanilla Town and Barinas, La Casa de la Encomienda, La Casa Cabrera, La Casa Pintada, El Monumento a las Fiestas de Moros y Cristianos (the Monument to the Festivals of the Moors and Christians) and La casa del francés (the French's house).

There is a destroyed medieval enceinte in Abanilla.

=== Local communities ===
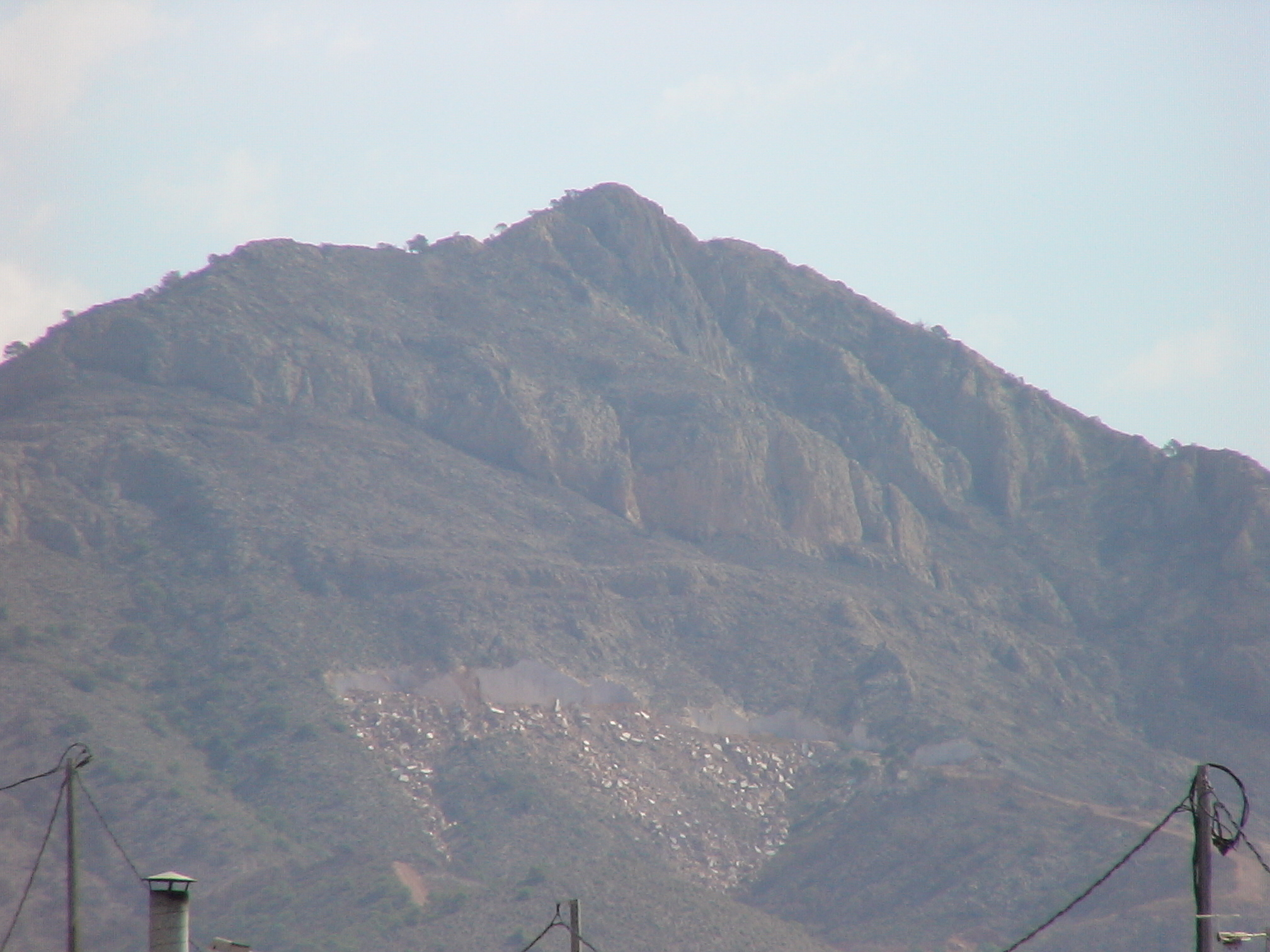
An abandoned quarry in Barinas

Local communities within the Abanilla municipality include the following.

- Barinas, a rural town located 11 km from Abanilla town, at an elevation of 379 m.
- Macisvenda, located 10 km from Abanilla town, a crossroads of the roads to La Algueña, El Cantón, Hondón de los Frailes and Hondón de las Nieves.
- Other communities include Mahoya, El Cantón, Cañada de la Leña, El Partidor, El Tollé, Los Baños de Fortuna, Casa Cabrera, Casa Pintada, Los Carrillos, La Umbría, Collado de los Gabrieles, Ricabacica, El Algarrobo, Campules, Balonga, Mafraque and El Olivar.

== History ==
There has been presence of human beings since the Paleolithic. Lithic workplaces corresponding to that era were found in the Southern half of the municipality.

This current municipality was also inhabited by people during the first centuries of the Ancient Era (from the 5th century to the 3rd in this case) by Iberians. There is a former settlement in the Northwest end it also occurs in Fortuna and Jumilla and another one in the south.

There were also people inhabitance and structures corresponding to the period when Romans ruled the Iberian Peninsula. A Roman road (via romana) traversed Abanilla and there are remains of it. Another site dating back from that era is a former Roman villa.

A war with conquer purposes begin in the Iberian Peninsula in 711. Muslim peoples intended to rule the peninsula and conquered large part of it from the starting year to 726. The nobleman Theodemir did an agreement with the governor Abd al-Aziz ibn Musa in 713 which name is Treaty of Orihuela. The treaty lead Abd al-Aziz to rule territory between Vinalopó and Segura rivers. Consequently, Abanilla had dependency on Orihuela during the Muslim Iberian Peninsula era.

A structure that originated in that period is the alcazaba (Arab fortification) of the town.

The king of the Taifa of Murcia signed the Treaty of Alcaraz, which consisted in conferring vassalage to the Crown of Castile, in 1243. Muslims were allowed to stay, and keep their religion, customs, organisations, etc. provided they paid extra taxes. In this era, Abanilla ceases being part of Orihuela because the first one belonged to Castile and the second one to Aragon.

In 1613, the king Ferdinand III of Castile ruled the expulsion of the Muslims. As there were rather many of them in Abanilla (over 1,000), the town turned out not to have enough workers for land labouring and that caused an economic downturn, which lasted for a century.

There had been an increase in population in the 18th century and there were over 7,000 inhabitants in that century. New dwellings and buildings were necessarily built beyond the town-surrounding wall. Many important buildings of the municipality were constructed during this century.

In the third quarter of the 20th century, water canals were built in Abanilla and drinking water supply begin to exist in the municipality.

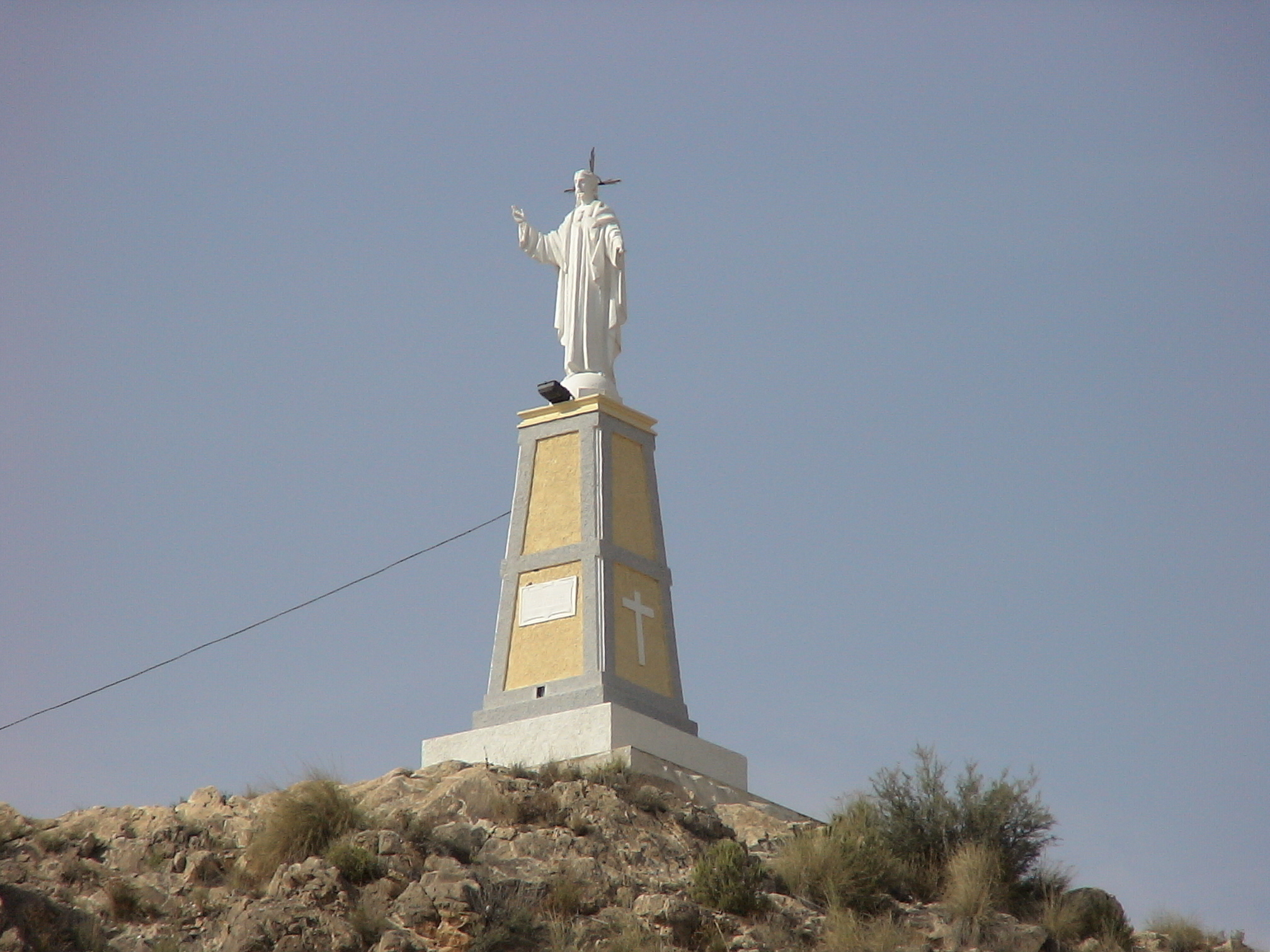
Barinas' Sacred Heart

== Politics ==
The mayor of Abanilla was Álvaro Gaona (Partido Independiente) from 1979 to 1983, José Luís Cutillas Rivera (Partido Socialista Obrero Español) from 1983 to 1987, Fernando Molina Parra (Partido Popular) from 1987 to 2015 and Ezequiel Alonso Gaona (Partido Socialista Obrero Español) from 2015.

== Demographics ==
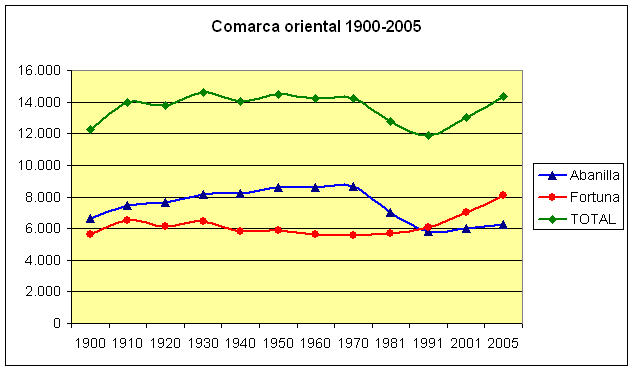
Population levels from 1900 to 2005 in comparison with the comarca as a whole

The population of Abanilla is 6,510 as of 2011.

Demographic evolution in Abanilla 1857–2008
1857	1860	1877	1887	1897	1900	1910	1920	1930	1940	1950	1960
4.324	4.650	5.689	5.617	6.121	6.634	7.451	7.641	8.179	8.220	8.620	8.594
1970	1981	1991	1996	2001	2002	2003	2004	2005	2006	2007	2008
8.675	7.049	5.827	6.130	6.033	6.040	6.239	6.145	6.245	6.333	6.568	6.642

== Economy ==
Agriculture has a high weight in the municipality. 28.8% of the territory is used as crops lands. The most wide grown products are the citrus, the almonds and the grapes. Almost 55.2% of the agreements were made for agriculture and fishing activities in 2019 and 30.15% of the workers signed agreements for work as labourers. 29.6% of the agreements were written for posts in the tertiary sector and 9.73% were signed by waiters. 10% were signed by fabrication labourers.

== Culture ==
=== Gastronomy ===
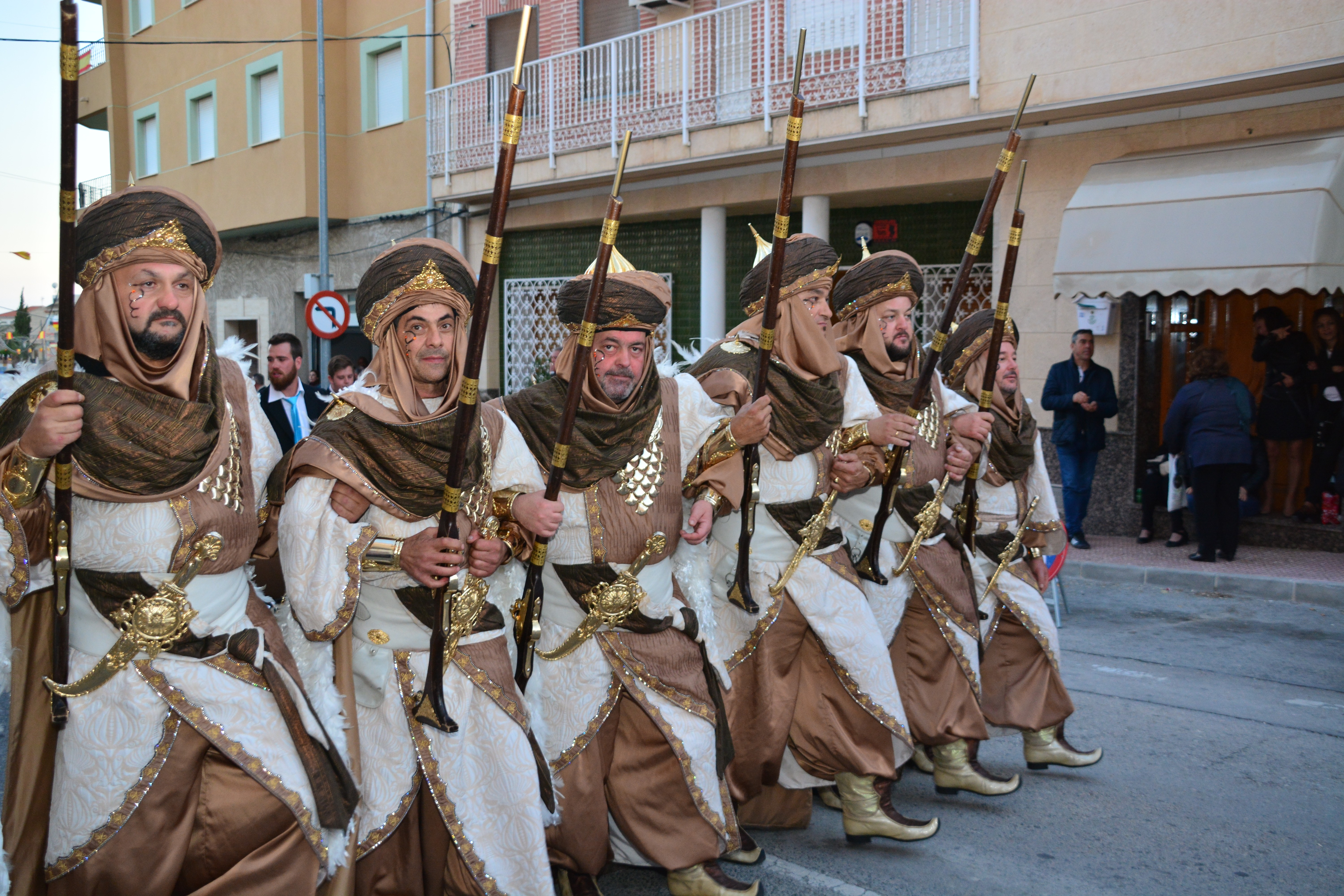
Moors and Christians.

Typical local dishes include home-made sausages, paella with rabbit and snails, gachasmigas. In particular, desserts include fruit from the fertile orchards, such as the region's renowned Damascus apricots. Traditional confectionery includes doughnuts, sweetbreads, muffins and typical Christmas sweets. All this is enhanced by the high quality oil pressed in local mills in the ancient custom.

=== Festivals ===
The International Folklore Festival is an important event which takes place in the first week of August. Between 23 April and 9 May, the festivals of Santa Cruz take place, featuring parades of Moors and Christians. In addition, from June through to the middle of September, the various communities celebrate their own individual festivals.

== See also ==
- List of municipalities in the Region of Murcia
