= Airén =

Variety of grape

- Grape (Vitis)
- Color of berry skin: White
- Species: Vitis vinifera
- Also called: see list of synonyms
- Origin: Spain
- Notable regions: La Mancha
- Notable wines: Vinos de Madrid
- VIVC number: 157

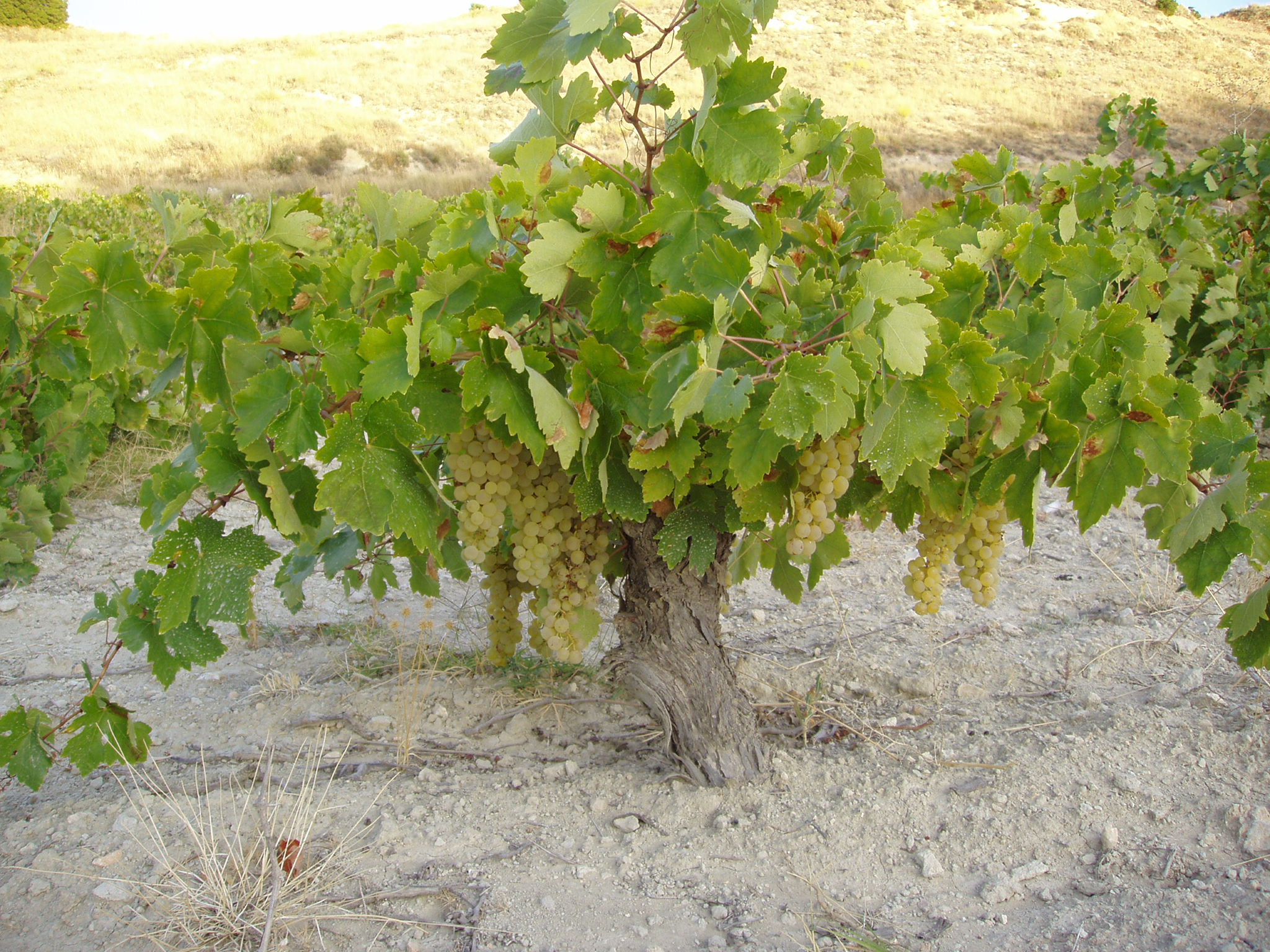
A 50-yr old Airén vine, from a vineyard near Carabaña (Madrid, Spain)

Airén is a variety of Vitis vinifera, a white grape commonly used in winemaking. This grape is native to Spain where it represents almost a quarter of all grapes grown. As of 2017, Airén was estimated to be the world's fourth most grown wine grape variety in terms of planted surface, at 252,000 hectares (620,000 acres), an increase from 218,000 hectares (540,000 acres) in 2004, where it held 1st place, although it is almost exclusively found in Spain.

Since Airén tends to be planted at a low density, several other varieties (including Cabernet Sauvignon and Merlot) are more planted in terms of number of vines.

== Description ==
The grapes have a cotton-like bud burst, which is bronze or yellowish in colour, with light reddish edge, and not very intense at the tip. The grapes have a trailing growing habit. The leaves of the Airén are average in size and have a pentagonal shape. The lower lateral sinuses are less marked than the upper ones and the upper face of the leaf is yellowish green in color while the lower face is velvety. The grape bunch is large in size and has an average compactness. It can grow in two different shapes: cylindrical or as a long cone. The grapes are large and spherical and have a yellowish color. The grapes are late to bud burst and also late to ripen. They yield about 4.5 to 6 kg per vine. Further, this grape is very resistant to drought and the base buds are fertile and thus resists very short pruning and still have acceptable yields.

== History ==
The first recorded mention of Airén was in 1615. In the 15th century it was known as Lairén (as it is in the Córdoba region today) and is cited as such in Gabriel Alonso de Herrera’s “Agricultura General”. This author however preferred to call it “Datileña” because the grapes were bunched together like dates. He confesses to not having tasted the wine but states that “it is not very strong nor does it have much body” and also that “it would be better to make raisins from these grapes as they are very shapely and abundant”.

In 1807, Roxas Clemente describes two types of Layrén: the first is the one we know today as the modern Airén from La Mancha and second is a table grape as described by Herrera as the Datileña. The first reference by Roxas Clemente mentions that Airén is also known as Mantúo Laerén and Laerén de Rey. He describes this variety as follows:

whitish very hard shoots. Green-yellowish very hairy leaves, with shallow sinuses and short (dientes), which fall off late. Tightly clustered grapes, large, rather late in maturing, with visible veins.

He says that this variety is grown in Sanlúcar, Xerez, Trebujena, Arcos, Espera, Moguer, Tarifa and Paxarete. He also mentions that it is grown in Valdepeñas and Manzanares, where it gives excellent wines for the production of exquisite spirits. The second reference by Roxas Clemente to Layrén states that this variety is synonymous to the Datileña. He describes it as:

Thin vine, which sprouts at the normal time. Numerous shoots, very long, curly, entirely hairless, rather light brown-reddish in colour, very soft. Medium-sized leaves, somewhat irregular, somewhat lobed, with normally sharp sinuses, upper face smooth, the fall off early, yellowish colour. Sufficient quantity of bunches, well set in the upper part, set in the lower part. Grapes about ten ‘lines’ long and six and a half wide at the most, somewhat thin towards the tip, very frequently slightly concave on the side facing the stem and convex on the opposite side, quite golden, very translucent, very meaty early on, stem somewhat thick.

This grape, according to Roxas Clemente, is used for the production of raisins and to mix its must with that of the Ximénez variety, and in 1807 was grown in Sanlúcar, Xerez, Trebujena, Algeciras, Arcos, Espera, Moguer, Málaga, Motril, Albuñol, Adra y Paxarete.

In 1885, Abela stated that Mantúo Laerén, apart from the areas mentioned by Roxas Clemente, was also grown in the region of Córdoba (known there as Mantúo Lairén) and in the areas around Cáceres, Ciudad Real, Málaga, Sevilla and Toledo, where it was known as Lairén.

In 1914, García de los Salmones mentioned the cultivation of Lairén in Madrid, Villacañas (Toledo), Tarancón (Cuenca), Campo de Criptana (Ciudad Real), Frejenal de la Sierra (Badajoz), Montefrío (Granada), Baeza (Jaén), Coín (Málaga), Fiñana (Almería), Cazalla de la Sierra (Sevilla), Espera (Cádiz) and Córdoba. And as Airén in Albacete.

In 1954, Marcilla defined the Airén variety as a typical vine in the La Mancha region, grown almost exclusively in that area. He described it as a

Trailing vine, very fertile including the first buds of the shoots, thus allowing very short pruning. Large bunches, quite tightly clustered.

Of the wine made from these grapes he states:

Gives must from which excellent table wines can be made, and also fine, white wines with a distinctive taste, although this is not very common practice in La Mancha. The average alcohol content of these wines is about 12-14°, and in good years up to 15°.

He also mentions Lairén as being grown in Montilla (Córdoba) and in Extremadura.

In 1965, Fernández de Bobadilla described Mantúo Laerén as:

Vine with a sturdy trunk, semi-erect shoots, of average length, large leaf, orb-like, wedge-shaped, with 5 lobes, deep upper lateral sinuses, and overlapping edges; marked lower sinuses, more or less intense green upper face, velvety lower face. Numerous bunches and very similar, very long and thin, cylindrical and not very compact. Fat grapes, ovoid shaped, greenish colour, slightly golden, thick stem, hard pulp not very juicy.

He says the following about its agronomic properties:

Late ripening variety, good for transporting, not very sweet must, which gives low quality wines, as indicated by its classification among the Montuos, or not very select varieties. Good to eat.

In 1976, Hidalgo described Airén as follows:

Low-lying structure. Adult leaf: pentagonal and wedge-shaped, average size, upper lateral sinuses with overlapping edges, lower sinuses lyre-shaped, hairless upper face, scratchy (arañoso) lower face, strong green colour. Large, loose bunches. Big grape size, regular yellow colour, spheroid shape, soft pulp. Average shoots, strong, very branched.

In the "Inventario Vitícola Nacional" by Hidalago and Rodríguez Candela (1971) Airén is cited as growing in Ciudad Real, Cuenca, Madrid, Málaga y Toledo. As Lairén is cited as growing in Córdoba, Jaén y Sevilla. As Valdepeñera or Airén grown in Albacete.

In Jancis Robinson’s "Guía de Uvas para Vinificación" (1996) Airén is cited as the most grown variety of grape in the world: with 423.100 ha under cultivation, it exceeds Garnacha (Grenache) with 317.500 ha, Mazuelo with 244.330 ha, Ugni blanc with 203.400 ha, Merlot with 162.200 ha and Cabernet Sauvignon with 146.200 ha. She comments that it is the most common variety in Spain, comprising 30% of all vines. It is absolutely dominant in the Valdepeñas area and in La Mancha. She also comments that in the south of Spain it is known as Lairén.

In his book "Cepas del Mundo" (1997), José Peñín gives the origin of Airén as being in La Mancha, from where two thirds of all the grapes grown in Spain come from. It is absolutely the dominant variety in this region, especially so in Ciudad Real and Toledo, and slightly less so in Albacete and Cuenca. It can also be found further south in Montilla-Moriles. Peñín describes the wine made from Airén as follows:

Airén has had a bad press, more due to the processes used which never did it justice, rather than for the quality of the vine itself. In the past, there was a double problem of low productivity, due mainly to the low density of the plantations, along with the traditional method of fermenting in terra cotta fermentation vats. In addition, almost all the wine was sent to other regions to mix in with other musts or for distillation. In general, the wine [from Airén] are characterised by a pallid colour with yellow iridescences; in the nose, mature fruit can be noted (banana, pineapple or grapefruit), and in the mouth, despite a certain lack of acidity, they are quite tasty and pleasant, easy to drink, though not ‘elegant’. The best ones have a fresh bouquet of roses, with a fine harmonious taste that does not leave false tastes at the back of the mouth.

Peñín goes on to comment on the agronomic characteristics:

Late sprouting and maturing variety. Alcoholic content of about 13 or 14°. The vine is perfectly adapted to the harsh arid climate of La Mancha, its calcareous soils, and at up to 700 m above sea level. It is very resistant to drought and to diseases, which explains its extensive planting after the phylloxera crisis.

From this bibliography, it can be observed that two types of Airén (Lairén or Layrén) are described: one is the variety extensively grown in La Mancha and which is cited in the first reference by Clemente, by Abela, by García de los Salmones, by Marcilla, by Hidalgo, by Jancis Robinson, and by Peñín. The second type of Airén (Layrén or Datileña) is a table grape used to produce raisins and which is described by Alonso de Herrera, in the second reference by Clemente, and by Fernández de Bobadilla. The first mention of the name Airén (currently the most widely used denomination to define this variety) is in the citation by García de los Salmones (1914) in the province of Albacete.

== Regions ==
Airén is by far the most abundant in the Valdepeñas and La Mancha DOs, very abundant in the provinces of Ciudad Real, Toledo, and only slightly less so in Albacete and Cuenca. The low vine density of Airén in La Mancha has led it to be known as the largest area, planted to a single grape variety, in the world. It can also be found significantly in Madrid and as far south as Montilla-Moriles.

== Viticulture and uses ==
Airén is allowed in the following DOs: Alicante, Bullas, Jumilla, La Mancha, Valdepeñas and Vinos de Madrid. As Layrén it is allowed in Montilla-Moriles.

The Airén vine is commonly planted in unusually low vine density, around 1500 vines per hectare, which has a deleterious effect on wine quality as with any grape variety. Its vineyards cover vast areas but as trends in Spanish wine production move towards red wine, a huge number of Airéns vines are being uprooted, not least because the grape often produces an acidic and characterless wine, such as the wines produced from La Mancha's Airén vines. Due to the anonymous nature of Airén wines, its principal use has generally been in the manufacture of Spanish brandy.

== Synonyms ==
Airén is also known under the synonyms Aiden, Blancon, Forcallada, Forcallat, Forcallat blanca, Forcallat blanco, Forcayat, Forcellat bianca, Forcellat blanca, Laeren del Rey, Lairen, Layren, Manchega, Mantuo Laeren, Valdepenas, Valdepenera blanca, and Valdepenero.
