= Pedro Ximénez =

Variety of grape grown in Southern Spain

- Grape (Vitis)
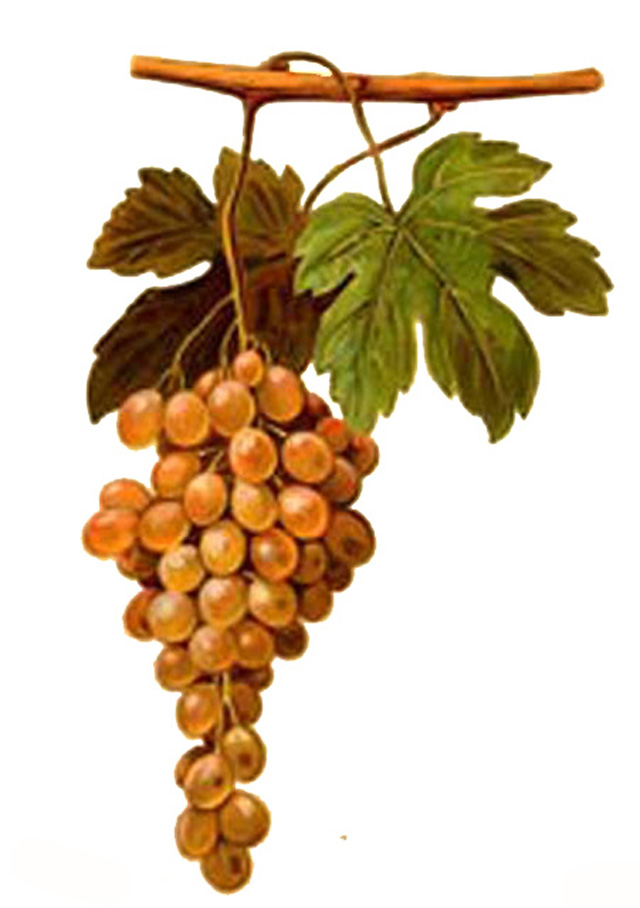
- Pedro Ximénez in Viala & Vermorel
- Color of berry skin: Blanc
- Species: Vitis vinifera
- Also called: PX, Pedro Jiménez, (more)
- Origin: Spain
- Notable regions: Montilla-Moriles, Jerez, Australia, Chile,
- Notable wines: Pedro Ximénez
- VIVC number: 9080

Pedro Ximénez (also known as PX and many other variations; Andalusian pronunciation [ˌpeðrohiˈmene]) is a white Spanish wine grape variety grown in several Spanish wine regions, most notably the denominación de origen (DO) of Montilla-Moriles. Here it is used to produce a varietal wine, an intensely sweet, dark, dessert sherry. It is made by drying the grapes under the hot sun, concentrating the sweetness (similar to straw wine production), which are then used to create a thick, black liquid with a strong taste of raisins and molasses that is fortified and aged in solera.

Pedro Ximénez is also grown in Australia. There, it is often used for blending, to make botrytised dessert wines, and to make fortified wines. This grape variety has thrived in Western Australia's Swan Valley since its introduction there due to the hot climate growing conditions. The vine requires a rich soil and short pruning. James Busby brought some Pedro Ximénez to Australia in 1832. Some were imported from Jerez and planted at Clarendon; a transfer from the Sydney Botanic Garden is recorded in around 1839.

Pedro Giménez (Pedro Jiménez) is a widely grown criolla variety in South America whose relationship to Pedro Ximénez is uncertain, as it shows ampelographic differences.

== History ==
The Andalusia region of southern Spain where Pedro Ximénez probably originated.

There have been several apocryphal legends about the grape's origins. In 1661, the German ampelographer F. J. Sachs speculated that Pedro Ximénez originated in either the Canary Islands or Madeira and was later brought to the German wine regions of the Rheingau, Rheinhessen and eventually the Mosel before either a Spanish soldier named Pedro Ximen or a Catholic Cardinal named Ximenès brought the grape to Málaga and Sierras de Málaga. This theory, which was spread in various incarnations by other German wine writers such as Baron August Wilhelm von Babo and Balthasar Sprenger, also led to speculation that Pedro Ximénez was somehow related to (or possibly even the same grape as) the German wine grapes Elbling and Riesling but DNA evidence in the late 20th and early 21st century has discounted those theories.

Today ampelographers believe that Pedro Ximénez probably originated somewhere in the Andalusia region of southern Spain where the grape has been growing since at least the early 17th century. In 1618, the Spanish writer Vicente Espinel described the famous wine of "Pedro Ximénez de Malaga". In 2007, DNA analysis showed that Pedro Ximénez was the offspring of the Arabic table grape Gibi which was once grown in southern France and throughout the Iberian Peninsula, possibly introduced sometime during the Al-Andalus period of Moorish rule. Gibi was also discovered to be one of the parent varieties of the Extremadura wine grape Alarije, making the later variety a half-sibling to Pedro Ximénez.

The origin of the name Pedro Ximénez is not yet clear with French ampelographer Joseph Roy-Chevrier speculating in 1905 that the grape was named after the village of Jiménez in Sanlúcar de Barrameda. As Ximénez and Jiménez are common surnames in Iberia, another theory is that the grape was named after a notable vintner who helped propagate the variety in the region.

== Viticulture ==
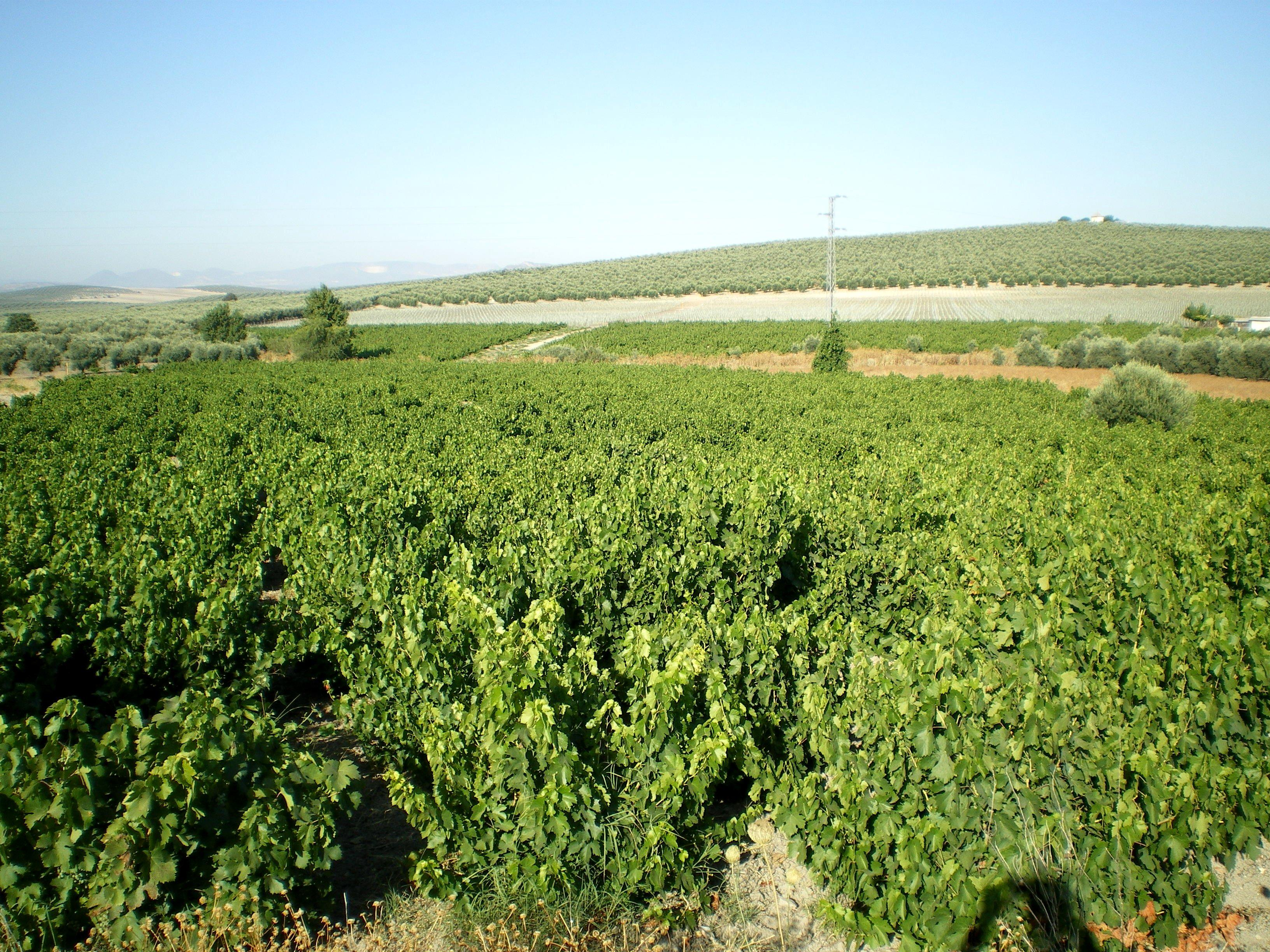
Pedro Ximénez vines growing in the Montilla-Moriles region.

Pedro Ximénez is a mid to late ripening grape variety that also tends to bud at the midpoint of the budding period of the vine growing season. The vine can be very vigorous and productive, producing large clusters of berries of irregular sizes (occasionally the result of millerandage). Despite having thin skinned berries, Pedro Ximénez is highly susceptible to the viticultural hazard of botrytis bunch rot as well as downy mildew, esca and eutypa dieback. The vine has some resistance to the fungal disease powdery mildew but is also very prone to damage caused by termite infection.

== Relationship and confusion with other grapes ==
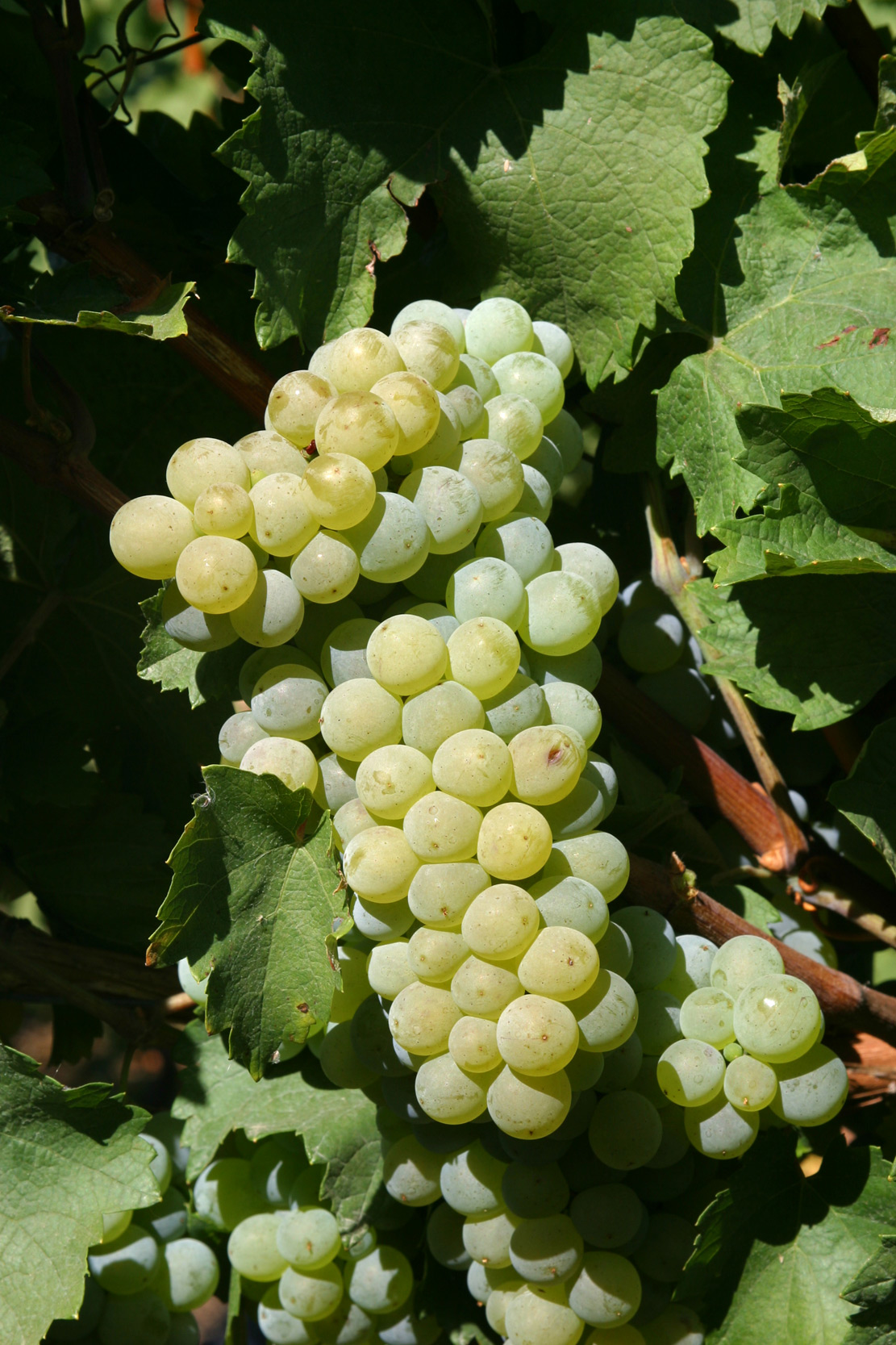
At one time, the German wine grape Elbling (pictured) was thought to be related, or possibly identical, to Pedro Ximénez.

DNA evidence has shown that Pedro Ximénez is an offspring variety of the Arabic table grape Gibi and a half sibling to Alarije. In 2007, it was also confirmed that the table grape Corinto bianco was a seedless mutation of Pedro Ximénez.

At one point it was thought that Pedro Ximénez was related (or possibly identical) to the German wine grapes Elbling and/or Riesling; but in addition to DNA evidence disproving a relationship, viticultural evidence had shown for many decades that Pedro Ximénez requires a much warmer climate than most German wine grapes in order to fully ripen, and was thus not likely to be closely related to any German wine variety. Other grapes that are sometimes confused with Pedro Ximénez include the Portuguese wine grape Galego Dourado, which shares several synonyms with Pedro Ximénez and was confused with the vine in South Africa, and the Argentine wine grape Pedro Giménez, which also shares several synonyms.

== Wine regions ==
=== Spain ===
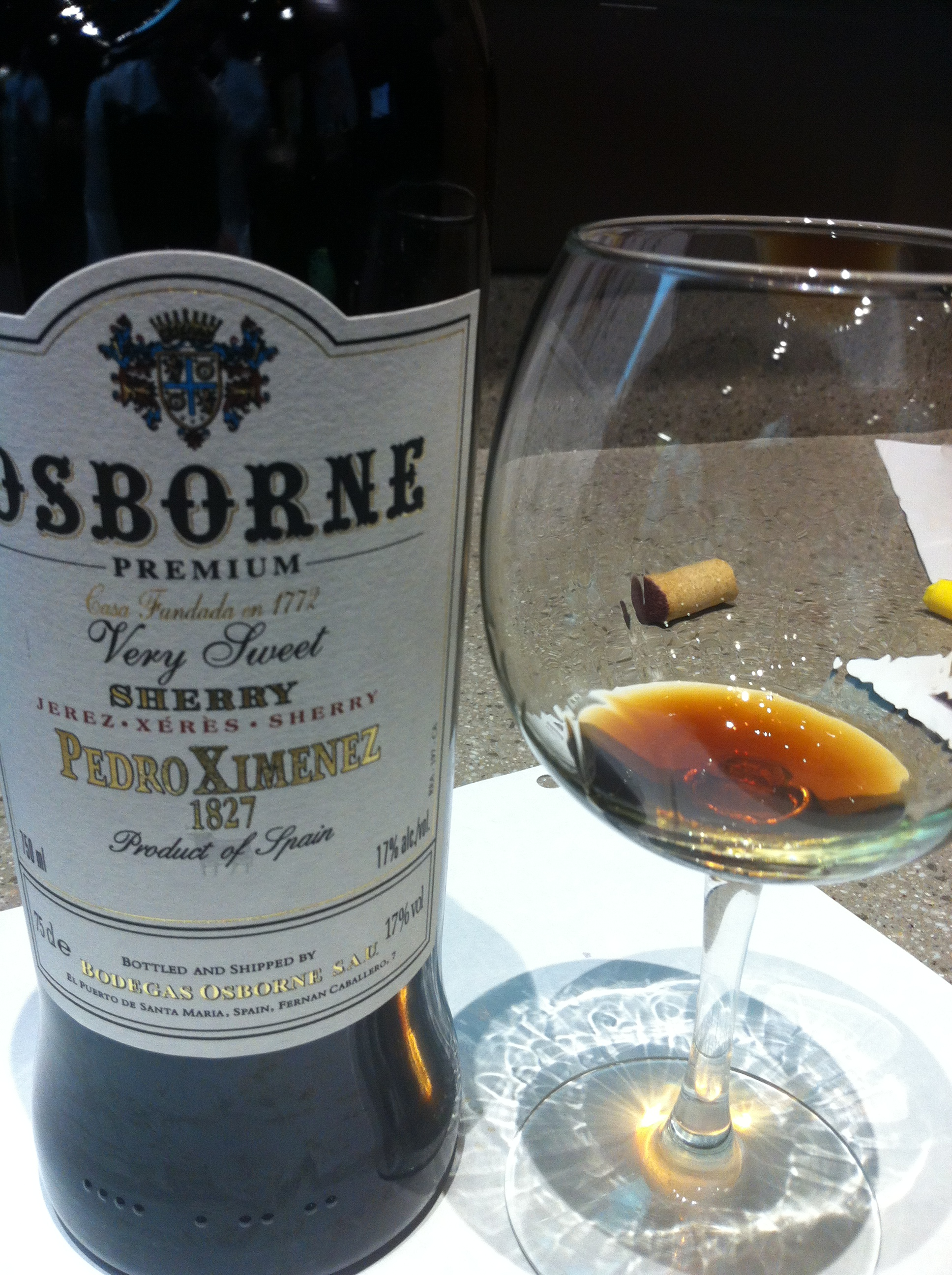
A Pedro Ximénez Sherry from the Jerez region whose wine label indicates that the wine has been aged in a solera that has been in operation since 1827.

Pedro Ximénez is most widely grown in Spain, where there were 6,950 hectares (17,200 acres) of the grape in cultivation as of 2019. The vast majority of these plantings are found in the Spanish wine region of Montilla-Moriles where the grapes are used to make fortified style wines labelled as PX. After harvest the Pedro Ximénez grapes are traditionally laid out on mats to further desiccate and dry in the sun (in a style similar to straw wine production). The high sugar and low acid wine made from these pressings may be fortified or not, depending on winemaker style, but will usually be very sweet and have a strong aroma and flavor of raisins and dried figs. The wine may also be aged in a solera, Montilla-Moriles similar to Sherry, with the age of the solera often stated on the wine label. Additionally, some Pedro Ximénez grapes are used as sweetening agents for other wines made in the Montilla-Moriles region.

The grape can also be found in the denominación de origen (DO) of Montilla-Moriles, Jerez de la Frontera, Málaga and Sierras de Málaga and Valencia. However, as the Pedro Ximénez grape tends to be very disease prone and often doesn't thrive in the albariza soils of Jerez like Palomino, Sherry producers in Jerez de la Frontera will often (legally) purchase Pedro Ximénez wine from the Montilla-Moriles region to blend into their sweet Sherry wine.

In 2008, plantings of Pedro Ximénez were found in Spain in the Canary Islands (less than 1 hectare (2.5 acres)), Castile-La Mancha (117 hectares (290 acres)), Catalunya (12 hectares (30 acres)) and Extremadura (639 hectares (1,580 acres)).

=== Outside Spain ===
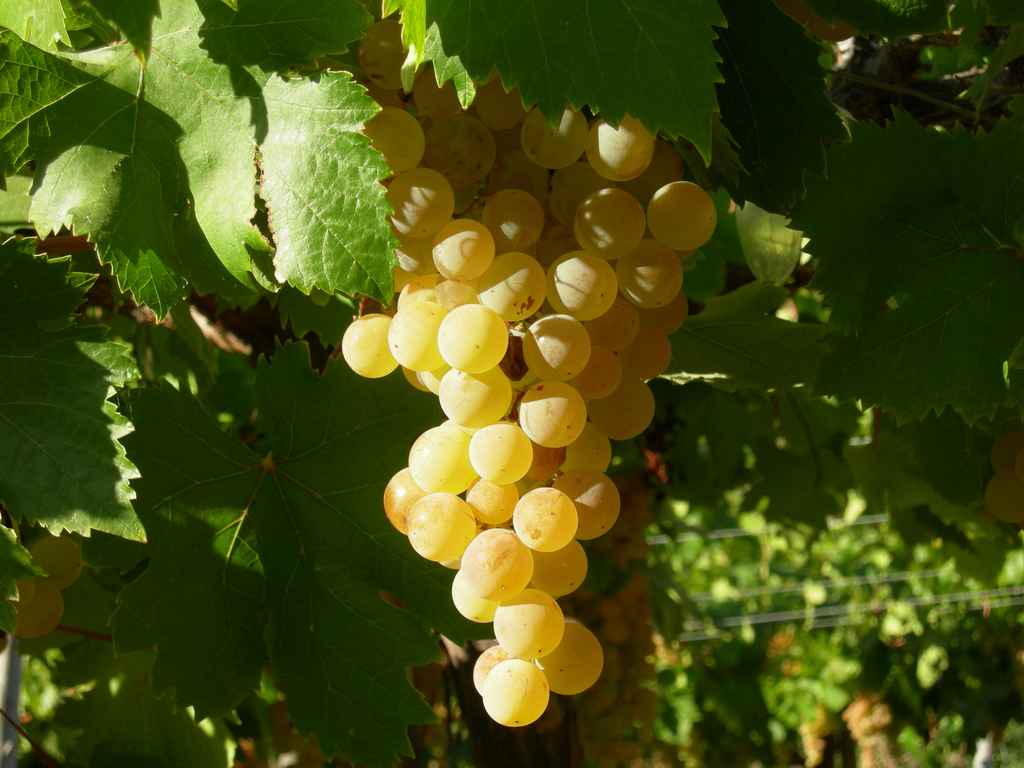
In South America, Pedro Ximénez is sometimes confused with the Argentine grape Pedro Giménez (pictured) which is often used in Chile in the production of pisco.

In 2010, there were 350 hectares (860 acres) of Pedro Ximénez planted in Portugal where the grape is most commonly known as Perrum. Here it is most widely planted in the Portuguese wine region of Evora and Borba in the Alentejo region with some limited plantings in the Vinho Regional (VR) zone of the Algarve in southern Portugal. While some varietal examples do exist, the grape is most commonly used as a blending varietal in Portugal.

In South America, most of the plantings of the grape known as Pedro Ximénez or Pedro Jimenez used in pisco production are actually an entirely different variety known in Argentina as Pedro Giménez. However, with the advances in DNA testing and improved knowledge of ampelography, plantings of authentic Pedro Ximénez have been identified as growing Chile with 33 hectares (82 acres) reported in 2008 (as opposed to the more than 3,000 hectares (7,400 acres) of Pedro Giménez grown in Chile). There is still some confusion as to which variety is which with producers in the Elqui Province making dry, fruity and unfortified varietal wines labeled as true Pedro Ximénez that may in all actuality still be the Argentine Pedro Giménez.

In Australia, Pedro Ximénez is known under the synonym of Pedro and has been historically used in producing unfortified, sweet sticky wines infected with noble rot and labeled as "Pedro Sauterne" (in reference to the French dessert wine Sauternes). While the grape was once widely planted in the irrigated vineyards of New South Wales near the town of Griffith, in recent years plantings have declined. Some limited plantings of the grape can still be found in Western Australia in the Margaret River region, in the Barossa Valley of South Australia and the Rutherglen region of Victoria where—despite Rutherglen's reputation for dessert wines—Pedro Ximénez is often used to produce dry, unfortified wines.

== Other uses ==
When the casks used to age Pedro Ximénez Sherry are retired, they are often sent to Scotland and Ireland, where they are used to age fine whisky. Single malt whisky aged in sherry casks is regarded by some as a special category with its own aficionados. The sweet Pedro Ximénez wine infused in the wood of the casks imparts some of the flavor and aroma of the wine to the whisky during the ageing process. In the whisky industry the taste of the Pedro Ximénez is very sweet. Most of the whiskies that get this treatment are only finished in Pedro Ximénez casks for a relatively short time, after spending the bulk of their maturation time in other casks. The Pedro Ximénez sweetness is often combined with a smoky peat flavor.

== Synonyms ==
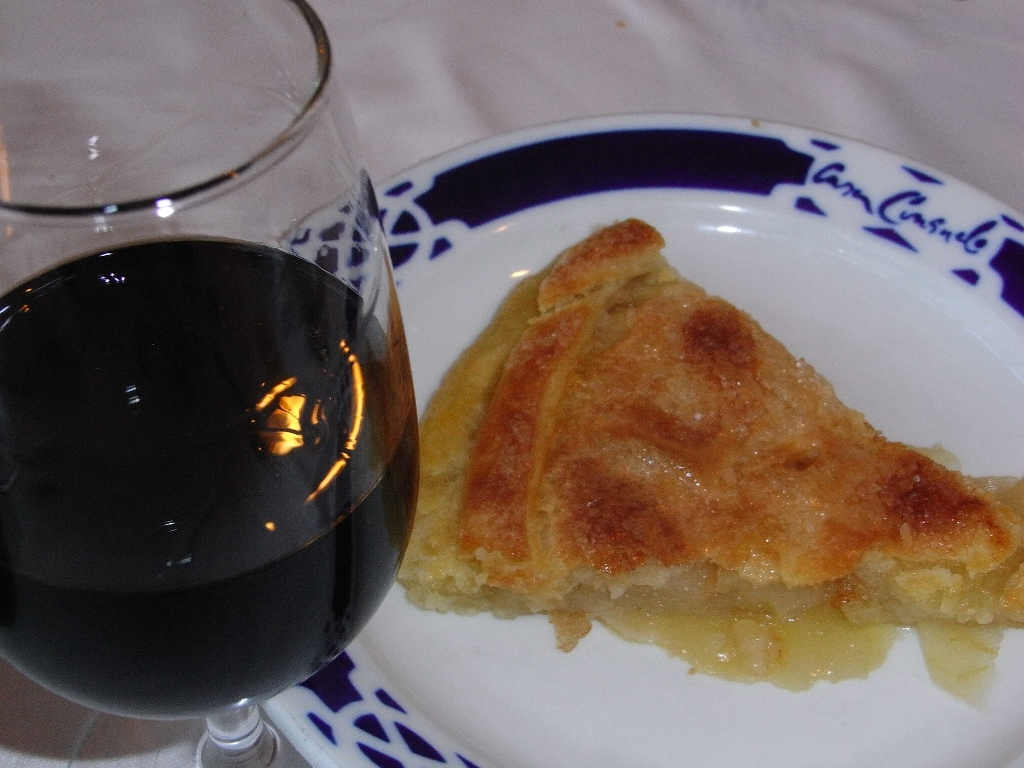
Pedro Ximénez wine paired with a Spanish dessert (Tarta de Manzana).

Over the years, Pedro Ximénez has been known under several synonyms including: Alamais, Chirones, Corinto bianco, Don Bueno, Jimenez, Pedro, Himenez, Ximénez, Ximénès, Pedro Jimenez (in Andalusia), Pedro Khimenes, Pedro Ximénès, Pedro Ximenes (in Andalusia), Pedro Ximenez, Pedro Ximenez Bijeli, Pedro Ximenes De Jerez, Pedro Ximenez De Montilla, Pedro Ximinez, Pero Ximen, Perrum (in the Alentejo region of Portugal), Peter Siemens, Pasa Rosada De Malaga, Pierre Ximenes, Uva Pero Ximenez, Uva Pero Ximen, Uva Pero Ximenes, Pero Ximenez, Ximen, Ximenes (in Andalusia), Ximenez, Alamis De Totana, Alamis, Myuskadel, Verdello (in the Canary Islands), Ximenecia, Zalema Colchicina and the abbreviation PX (in Andalucía).
