= List of Andalusian food and drink products with protected status =

The following is a list of food products produced in the autonomous community of Andalusia (Spain) that are covered by some indication of origin (in Spanish, denominación de origen) or quality label that guarantees and protects the product.

Protection of the quality of agri-food products in Spain began in 1932, when the first legislation on protected designation of origin for wines was introduced. With Spain's entry into the European Economic Community, quality protection figures became subject to European regulations. Following the European regulations, in Andalusia there are three different types of protection:

- Protected designation of origin (PDO): for products of superior quality and degree of differentiation.
- Protected Geographical Indication (PGI): for traditional terms such as Vino de la tierra.
- Traditional Specialty Guaranteed (TSG): for products that, without having a specific geographical origin, have differentiating features or are produced in a traditional or artisanal manner.
Andalusian food and drink products
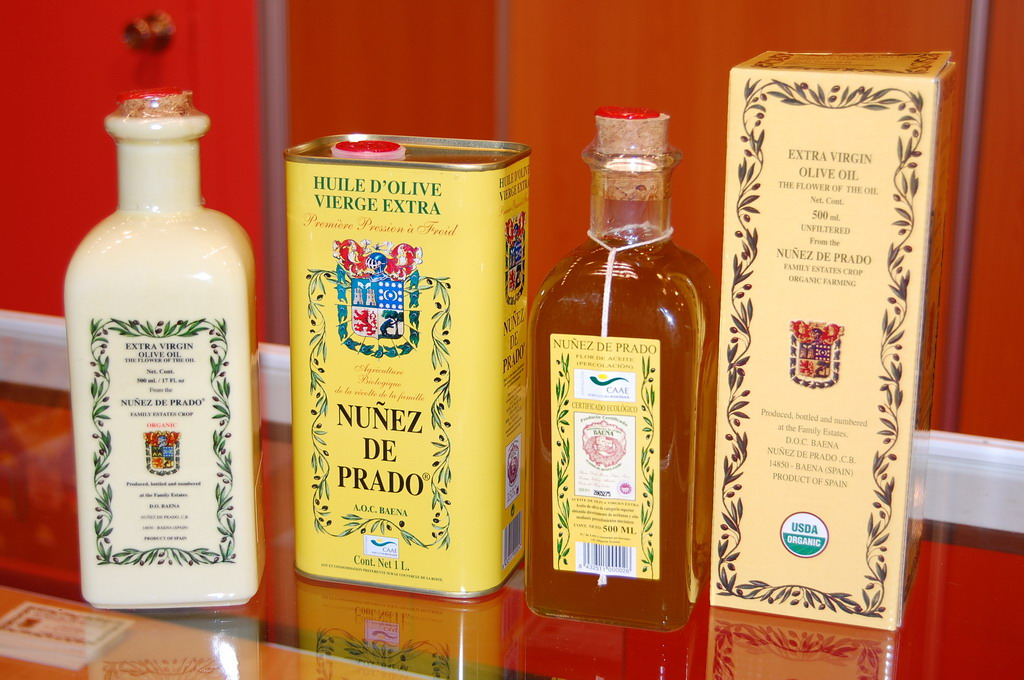
Oil of the Protected designation of origin Baena

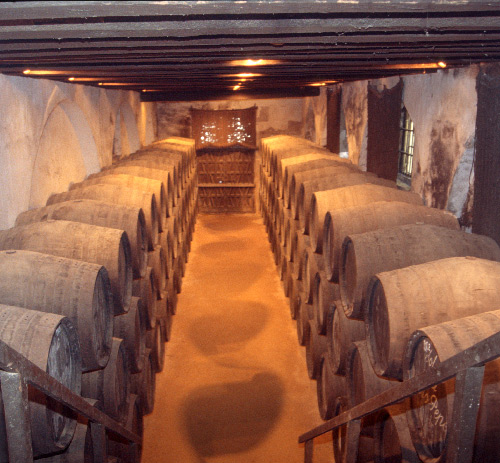
Sherry cellar

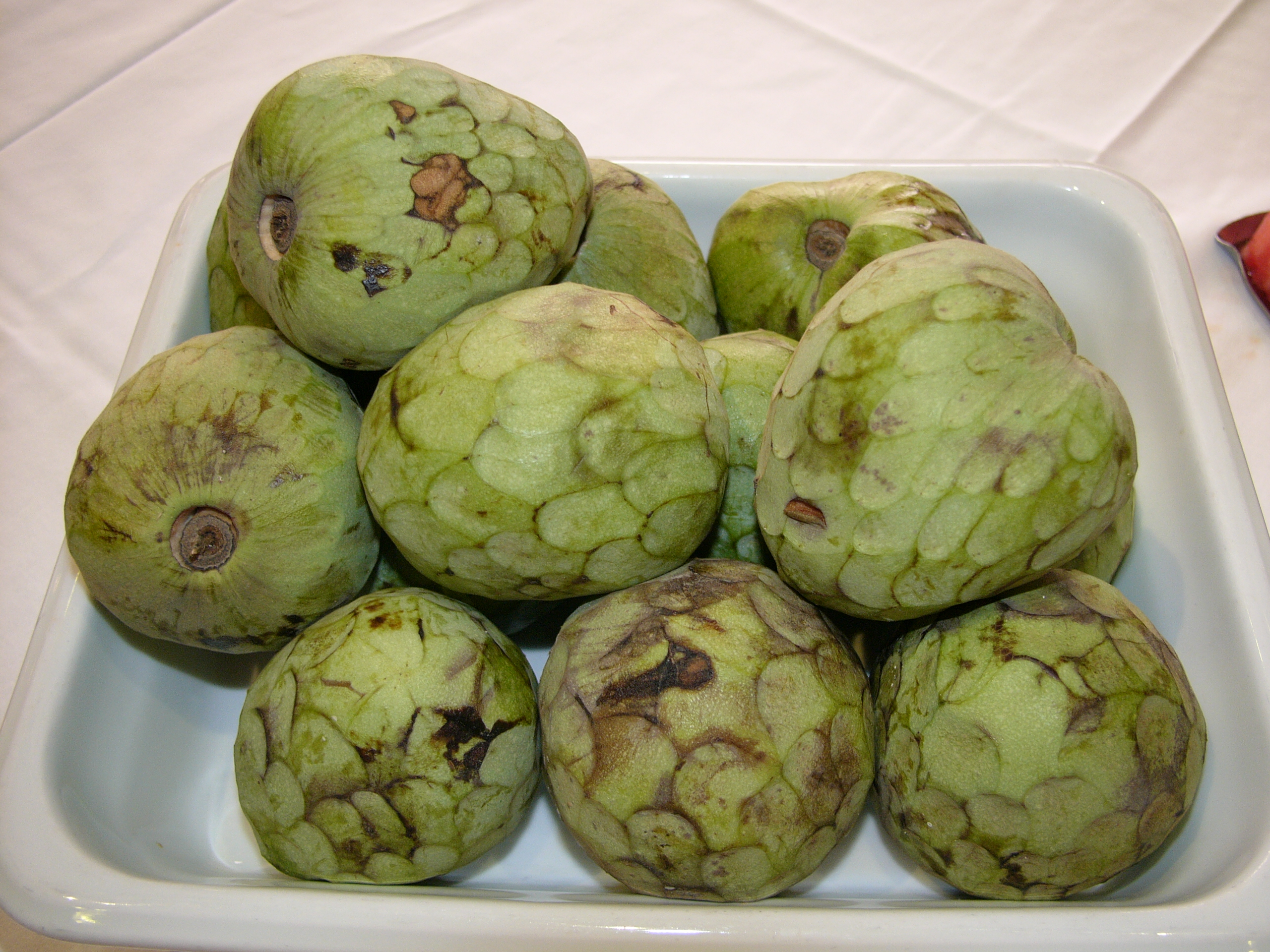
Cherimoyas of Andalusia

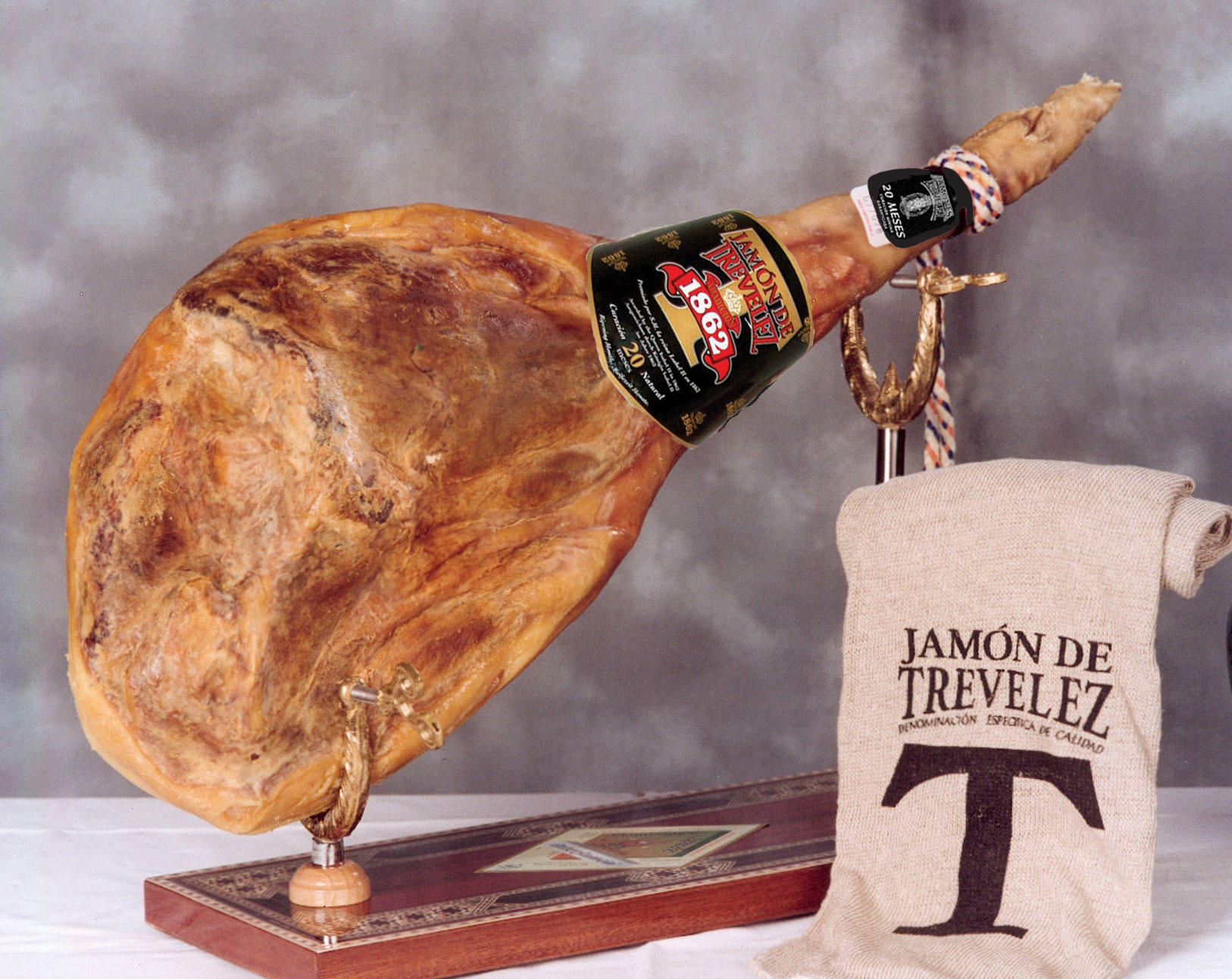
Trevélez ham

Delimited production areas for olive oils with Designation of Origin

Product	Protection	Procurement	Regulatory Council Headquarters
Olive oil
Antequera	Designation of Origin	2005	Antequera
Baena	Designation of Origin	1995	Baena
Estepa	Designation of Origin	2004	Estepa
Lucena	Designation of Origin	2009	Lucena
Montes de Granada	Designation of Origin	2001	Deifontes
Montoro-Adamuz	Designation of Origin	2007	Adamuz
Poniente de Granada	Designation of Origin	2003	Montefrío
Priego de Córdoba	Designation of Origin	1995	Priego de Córdoba
Sierra de Cádiz	Designation of Origin	2004	Olvera
Sierra de Cazorla	Designation of Origin	2000	Cazorla
Sierra de Segura	Designation of Origin	1993	La Puerta de Segura
Sierra Mágina	Designation of Origin	2004	Bedmar
Meat and fish
Caballa de Andalucía	Specific Designation	2003	Tomares
Melva de Andalucía	Specific Designation	2003	Tomares
Jamón de Jabugo	Designation of Origin	1995	Jabugo
Jamón de Trevélez	Specific Designation	1998	Trevélez
Jamón de Los Pedroches	Designation of Origin	2006	Villanueva de Córdoba
Cordero de las sierras de Segura y La Sagra	Specific Designation	2007	Huéscar
Jamón de Serón	Specific Designation	2014	Serón
Mojama de Barbate	Specific Designation	2014	Tomares
Mojama de Isla Cristina	Specific Designation	2014	Tomares
Fruits, vegetables and legumes
Aceituna Aloreña de Málaga	Designation of Origin	2009	Pizarra
Chirimoya de la Costa Tropical	Designation of Origin	2002	Almuñécar
Espárrago de Huétor-Tájar	Specific Designation	1996	Huétor-Tájar
Pasas de Málaga	Designation of Origin	1996	Málaga
Tomate de La Cañada-Níjar	Specific Designation	2008	Almería
Garbanzo de Escacena	Specific Designation	2013	Escacena del Campo
Vinegar
Vinagre de Montilla-Moriles	Designation of Origin	2008	Montilla
Vinagre del Condado de Huelva	Designation of Origin	2002	Bollullos Par del Condado
Vinagre de Jerez	Designation of Origin	2000	Jerez de la Frontera
Pastries
Alfajor de Medina Sidonia	Specific Designation	2004	Medina Sidonia
Mantecados de Estepa	Specific Designation	2009	Estepa
Mollete de Antequera	Specific Designation	2020	Antequera
Polvorones de Estepa	Specific Designation	2014	Estepa
Pan de Alfacar	Specific Designation	2013	Alfacar
Tortas de aceite de Castilleja de la Cuesta	Guaranteed Traditional Specialty	2013	Castilleja de la Cuesta
Wines
Altiplano de Sierra Nevada	Vino de la Tierra	2005	Cortes de Baza
Bailén	Vino de la Tierra	2004	Bailén
Cádiz	Vino de la Tierra	2005	Cádiz
Condado de Huelva	Designation of Origin	1962	Bollullos Par del Condado
Córdoba	Vino de la Tierra	2004	Montilla
Cumbres del Guadalfeo	Vino de la Tierra	2004	Cádiar
Desierto de Almería	Vino de la Tierra	2003	Lucainena de las Torres
Granada	Designation of Origin	2009	Peligros
Jerez-Xérèx-Sherry	Designation of Origin	1933	Jerez de la Frontera
Laderas del Genil	Vino de la Tierra	2003	Villanueva Mesía
Laujar-Alpujarra	Vino de la Tierra	2004	Laujar de Andarax
Lebrija	Vino de calidad	2009	Lebrija
Los Palacios	Vino de la Tierra	2003	Los Palacios y Villafranca
Málaga	Designation of Origin	1933	Málaga
Manzanilla de Sanlúcar	Designation of Origin	1977	Jerez de la Frontera
Montilla-Moriles	Designation of Origin	1944	Montilla
Vino Naranja del Condado de Huelva	Designation of Origin	2011	–
Norte de Almería	Vino de la Tierra	2008	Vélez Rubio
Ribera del Andarax	Vino de la Tierra	2003	Enix
Sierra Norte de Sevilla	Vino de la Tierra	2004	Sanlúcar la Mayor
Sierra Sur de Jaén	Vino de la Tierra	2003	Alcalá la Real
Sierras de las Estancias y los Filabres	Vino de la Tierra	2008	Lucar
Sierras de Málaga	Designation of Origin	2001	Málaga
Torreperogil	Vino de la Tierra	2006	Torreperogil
Villaviciosa de Córdoba	Vino de la Tierra	2008	Villaviciosa de Córdoba
Otros
Brandy de Jerez	Specific Designation	1989	Jerez de la Frontera
Miel de Granada	Designation of Origin	2002	Lanjarón

== See also ==
- Andalusian cuisine
