= Manchuela DO =

Coordinates: 39°22′N 1°42′W

Manchuela DOP
- Wine region
- Manchuela DO in the provinces of Albacete and Cuenca in the region of Castile-La Mancha
- Official name: D.O.P. Manchuela
- Type: Denominación de Origen Protegida (DOP)
- Year established: 2004
- Country: Spain
- Size of planted vineyards: 6,709 hectares (16,578 acres)
- No. of wineries: 37
- Wine produced: 52,003 hectolitres
- Comments: Data for 2016 / 2017

Manchuela is a Spanish Denominación de Origen Protegida (DOP) for wines located in the historical Manchuela comarca, in the east of the provinces of Albacete and Cuenca (Castile-La Mancha, Spain) between the valleys of the Rivers Júcar and Cabriel. It was originally part of a much larger La Mancha DOP and became a separate DOP in 2004. It is surrounded on three sides by other DOPs: La Mancha to the west, Utiel-Requena to the east and Jumilla to the south.

== History ==
La Manchuela DOP is the seventh DOP to be created in the region of Castile-La Mancha. It includes over seventy municipalities, including Albacete itself and Motilla del Palancar in Cuenca.

== Climate ==
The climate is continental (long hot dry summers, cold winters) influenced by the nocturnal moisture bearing winds from the Levant, which help keep the mean annual temperature down to 25°C. Temperatures in winter rarely fall low enough to cause frost. Humidity is very low and virtually no rainfall between the months of May and September.

== Soil ==
The soil is lime-bearing clay and the vineyards are at an altitude of 600 – 700 m above sea level. There are two large reservoirs just to the north of the area which are used for irrigation of the vines.

== Authorised Grape Varieties ==
The authorised grape varieties are:

- Red: Monastrell, Cencibel, Garnacha Tintorera, Garnacha, Cabernet Sauvignon, Merlot, Syrah, Petit Verdot, Cabernet Franc, Frasco, Graciano, Malbec, Mazuelo, Moravia Agria, Moravia Dulce, Pinot Noir, Bobal and Rojal
- White: Albillo, Chardonnay, Macabeo, Moscatel de Grano Menudo, Pardillo, Sauvignon Blanc, Verdejo, and Viognier
