= Extremadura (Vino de la Tierra) =

Geographical classification of Spanish wines

Extremadura VdlT
- Wine region
- Extremadura VdlT in the region of Extremadura
- Type: Vino de la Tierra
- Country: Spain

Extremadura is a Spanish geographical indication for Vino de la Tierra wines located in the autonomous region of Extremadura. Vino de la Tierra is one step below the mainstream Denominación de Origen indication on the Spanish wine quality ladder.

The area covered by this geographical indication comprises all the municipalities in Extremadura.

It acquired its Vino de la Tierra status in 1999.

== Grape varieties ==
- Red: Bobal, Mazuela, Monastrell, Tempranillo, Garnacha, Graciano, Merlot, Syrah and Cabernet Sauvignon.
- White: Alarije, Borba, Cayetana Blanca, Chardonnay, Chelva, Malvar, Viura, Parellada, Pedro Ximénez and Verdejo.
