= Ribera del Jiloca =

Spanish wine region

Ribera del Jiloca VdlT
- Wine region
- Ribera del Jiloca VdlT in the provinces of Teruel and Zaragoza in the region of Aragon
- Type: Vino de la Tierra
- Country: Spain

Ribera del Jiloca is a Spanish geographical indication for Vino de la Tierra wines located in the wine-producing area of the Jiloca Valley, in the provinces of Teruel and Zaragoza, in the autonomous region of Aragon, Spain. Vino de la Tierra is one step below the mainstream Denominación de Origen indication on the Spanish wine quality ladder.

The area covered by this geographical indication comprises 7 municipalities in the province of Teruel and 14 in the province of Zaragoza (Aragon, Spain).

It acquired its Vino de la Tierra status in 2005.

== Grape varieties ==
- White: Macabeo, Chardonnay and Garnacha blanca
- Red: Robal, Moristel, Monastrell, Bobal, Mazuela, Cabernet Sauvignon, Merlot, Graciano, Tempranillo, Garnacha tinta and Syrah
