= 3 Riberas =

Spanish geographical indication for wines

Coordinates: 42°48′21.1″N 1°38′9.2″W

IGP 3 Riberas
- Wine region
- Official name: Indicación Geográfica Protegida 3 Riberas
- Type: Indicación Geográfica Protegida / Vino de la Tierra
- Year established: 2008
- Country: Spain
- No. of wineries: 4

3 Riberas is a Spanish geographical indication for Vino de la Tierra wines located in the autonomous region of Navarre. Vino de la Tierra is one step below the mainstream Denominación de Origen indication on the Spanish wine quality ladder, and mirrors the Vins de pays of French wine. It acquired its Vino de la Tierra status in 2018.

== Authorised grape varieties ==
The authorised grape varieties are:

- Red: Garnacha Tinta, Tempranillo, Cabernet Sauvignon, Merlot, Syrah, Graciano, Mazuela, Pinot Noir, Monastrell, Bobal, and Maturana tinta
- White: Chardonnay, Moscatel de Grano Menudo, Garnacha Blanca, Sauvignon Blanc, Viura, Malvasía, Xarello, Parellada, Riesling, Gewürztraminer, Maturana Blanca, Tempranillo Blanco, Verdejo, Albillo Mayor (Turruntés)
