= Valle del Cinca =

Geographic description for Spanish wine

Valle del Cinca VdlT
- Wine region
- Valle del Cinca VdlT in the province of Huesca in the region of Aragon
- Type: Vino de la Tierra
- Country: Spain

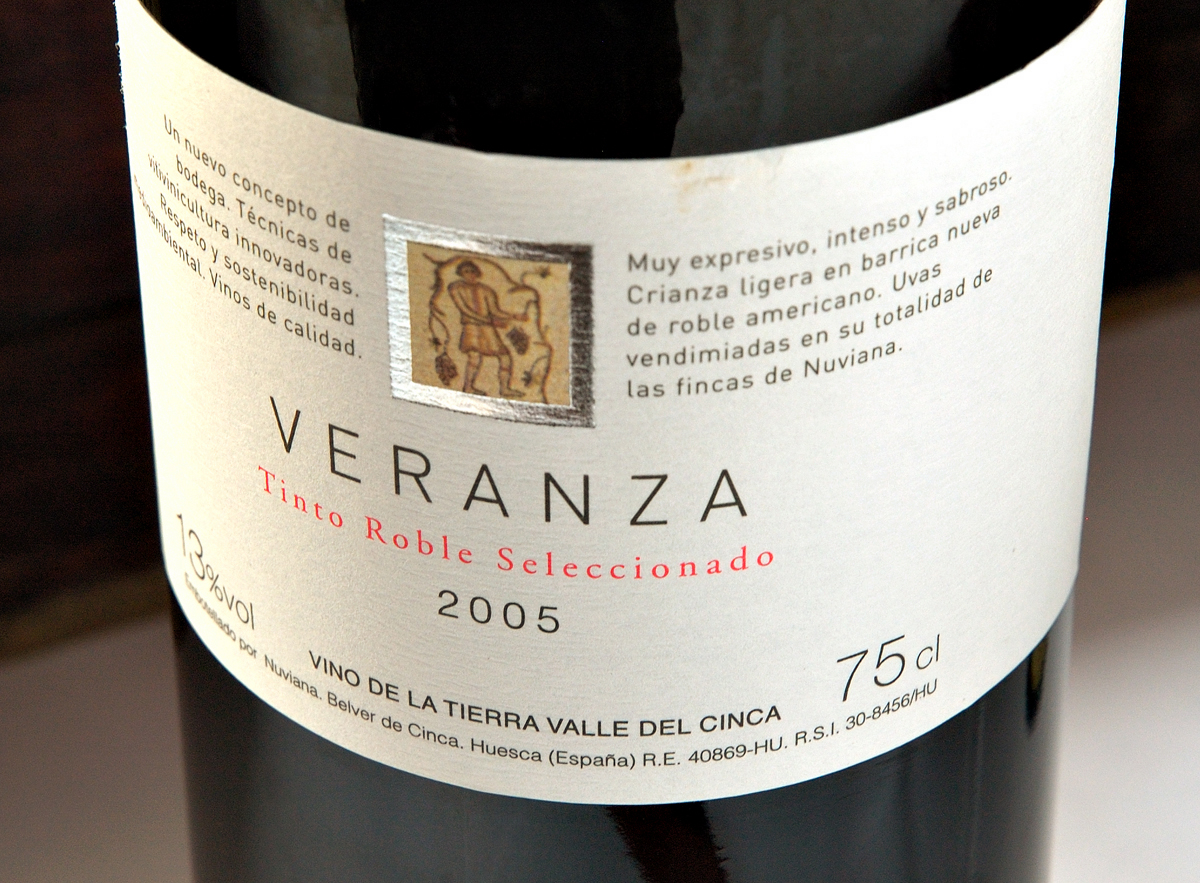
Label on a bottle of wine from the Valle del Cinca Vino de la Tierra region

Valle del Cinca is a Spanish geographical indication for Vino de la Tierra wines located in the wine-producing area of the Cinca Valley, in the province of Huesca, in the autonomous region of Aragon, Spain. Vino de la Tierra is one step below the mainstream Denominación de Origen indication on the Spanish wine quality ladder.

The area covered by this geographical indication comprises about 15 municipalities in the province of Huesca (Aragon, Spain).

It acquired its Vino de la Tierra status in 2005.

== Grape varieties ==
- White: Macabeo, Garnacha blanca, Chardonnay, Moscatel de Alejandría, Sauvignon blanc, Chenin, Gewürtztraminer, Malvasía and Riesling
- Red: Mazuela, Cabernet Sauvignon, Merlot, Tempranillo, Garnacha Graciano, Syrah, Cabernet franc, Moristel, Parraleta and Pinot noir
