= Castilla (Vino de la Tierra) =

Spanish wine geographical indication

Castilla VdlT
- Wine region
- Castilla VdlT in the region of Castilla-La Mancha
- Type: Vino de la Tierra
- Country: Spain

Castilla is a Spanish geographical indication for Vino de la Tierra wines located in the autonomous region of Castilla-La Mancha. Vino de la Tierra is one step below the mainstream Denominación de Origen indication on the Spanish wine quality ladder.

The area covered by this geographical indication comprises all the municipalities in Castilla-La Mancha.

It acquired its Vino de la Tierra status in 1999.

== Grape varieties ==
- Red: Bobal, Cabernet Sauvignon, Garnacha tinta, Merlot, Monastrell, Petit Verdot, Syrah, Tempranillo or Cencibel or Jacivera, Coloraíllo, Frasco, Garnacha tintorera, Moravia agria, Moravia dulce or Crujidera, Negral or Tinto Basto, and Tinto Velasco
- White: Airén, Albillo, Chardonnay, Macabeo or Viura, Malvar, Sauvignon blanc, Merseguera, Moscatel de grano menudo, Pardillo or Marisancho, Pedro Ximénez and Torrontés
