= Valdejalón (Vino de la Tierra) =

Geographic designation for Spanish wine

Valdejalón VdlT
- Wine region
- Valdejalón VdlT in the province of Zaragoza in the region of Aragon
- Type: Vino de la Tierra
- Country: Spain

Valdejalón is a Spanish geographical indication for Vino de la Tierra wines located in the wine-producing area of Valdejalón, in the province of Zaragoza, in the autonomous region of Aragon, Spain. Vino de la Tierra is one step below the mainstream Denominación de Origen indication on the Spanish wine quality ladder.

The area covered by this geographical indication comprises about 40 municipalities in the province of Zaragoza (Aragon, Spain).

It acquired its Vino de la Tierra status in 1998.

== Grape varieties ==
- White: Macabeo, Garnacha blanca, Chardonnay and Moscatel de Alejandría
- Red: Monastrell, Mazuela, Cabernet Sauvignon, Merlot, Tempranillo, Garnacha tinta Graciano and Syrah
