= Ribera del Gállego-Cinco Villas =

Geographical description for Spanish wine

Ribera del Gállego - Cinco Villas VdlT
- Wine region
- Ribera del Gállego - Cinco Villas VdlT in the provinces of Huesca and Zaragoza in the region Aragon
- Type: Vino de la Tierra
- Country: Spain

Ribera del Gállego-Cinco Villas is a Spanish geographical indication for Vino de la Tierra wines located in the wine-producing areas of Ribera del Gállego and the Cinco Villas, in the provinces of Huesca and Zaragoza, in the autonomous region of Aragon, Spain. Vino de la Tierra is one step below the mainstream Denominación de Origen indication on the Spanish wine quality ladder.

The area covered by this geographical indication comprises about 10 municipalities in the province of Huesca and about 20 in the province of Zaragoza (Aragon, Spain).

It acquired its Vino de la Tierra status in 2003.

== Grape varieties ==
- White: Macabeo and Garnacha blanca
- Red: Moristel, Mazuela, Cabernet Sauvignon, Merlot, Tempranillo, Garnacha tinta and Syrah
