= Valtiendas (Vino de Calidad) =

Spanish wine designation

Valtiendas VdC
- Wine region
- Type: Vino de calidad
- Country: Spain

Valtiendas is a Spanish geographical indication for wines referred to legally as Vino de calidad con Indicación Geográfica. This is one step below the mainstream Denominación de Origen quality wines and one step above the less stringent Vino de la Tierra table wines on the quality ladder.

It is located in the province of Segovia (region of Castile and León) and borders on the well-known wine region of Ribera del Duero.

Only the following red grape varieties are authorized: Tempranillo or Tinta del país, Cabernet Sauvignon, Syrah, Albillo, Garnacha and Merlot.
