= Castelló (Vino de la Tierra) =

Castelló VdlT
- Wine region
- Castelló VdlT in the province of Castellón in the region of Valencia
- Type: Vino de la Tierra
- Country: Spain

Castelló is a Spanish geographical indication for Vino de la Tierra (Vi de la Terra in Valencian) wines located in the province of Castellón (Castelló in Valencian) in the autonomous region of Valencia. Vino de la Tierra is one step below the mainstream Denominación de Origen indication on the Spanish wine quality ladder.

The area covered by this geographical indication comprises the areas of Alto Palancia, Alto Mijares, Sant Mateu, les Useres and Vilafamés

It acquired its Vino de la Tierra status in 2004.

== Grape varieties ==
- Red: Bobal, Cabernet Sauvignon, Garnacha, Garnacha tintorera, Merlot, Monastrell, Pinot noir and Tempranillo, Bonicaire and Syrah
- White: Chardonnay, Malvasía, Merseguera, Moscatel de Alejandría, Pedro Ximénez, Planta fina de Pedralba, Macabeo, Airén, Planta nova, Sauvignon blanc and Verdil.
