= Cangas (Vino de la Tierra) =

Coordinates: 43°10′48″N 6°32′48″W

Cangas DOP
- Wine region
- Cangas DOP in the region of Asturias
- Official name: Denominación de Origen Protegida Cangas / Vino de Calidad de Cangas
- Type: Denominación de Origen Protegida (DOP) / Vino de Calidad (VC)
- Year established: 2009
- Country: Spain
- No. of vineyards: 32 hectares (79 acres)
- Wine produced: 776 hectolitres
- Comments: Data for 2016 / 2017

Cangas is a Spanish Denominación de Origen Protegida (DOP), traditionally called a Vino de calidad con Indicación Geográficafor wines located in the autonomous region of Asturias. This is one step below the mainstream Denominación de Origen quality wines and one step above the less stringent Vino de la Tierra wines on the quality ladder.

The area covered by this geographical indication comprises the following municipalities in Asturias: Cangas del Narcea, Allande, Grandas de Salime, Illano, Pesoz and Ibias.

It acquired its Vino de la Tierra status in 2001 and its Vino de Calidad status in 2009.

== Authorised Grape Varieties ==
The authorised grape varieties are:

- Red: Garnacha Tintorera, Mencía, and Verdejo Negro are preferred; also authorised are Albarín Negro, Carrasquín, Merlot, Pinot Noir, and Syrah
- White: Albarín blanco, Albillo, and Picapoll Blanco are preferred; also authorised are Godello, Gewürztraminer, Moscatel de Grado Menudo
