= Lebrija (wine classification) =

Spanish wine designation

Coordinates: 36°54′54.1″N 6°05′04.7″W

Lebrija DOP
- Wine region
- Official name: Denominación de Origen Protegida Lebrija / Vino de Calidad de Lebrija
- Type: Denominación de Origen Protegida (DOP) / Vino de Calidad (VC)
- Year established: 2010
- Country: Spain
- No. of wineries: 1

Lebrija is a Spanish Denominación de Origen Protegida (DOP), traditionally called a Vino de calidad con Indicación Geográfica. This is one step below the mainstream Denominación de Origen quality wines and one step above the less stringent Vino de la Tierra wines on the quality ladder. It is located in the province of Seville (region of Andalusia), and as of 2019 includes one winery, Bodegas González Palacios.

== Authorised grape varieties ==
The authorised grape varieties are:

- Red: Tempranillo, Cabernet Sauvignon, Merlot, Syrah, and Tintilla de Rota
- White: Sauvignon Blanc, Moscatell d’Alexandria, Palomino, and Palomino fino
