= Bajo Aragón (Vino de la Tierra) =

Protected geographical indication for Spanish wine

Bajo Aragón VdlT
- Wine region
- Bajo Aragón VdlT in the provinces of Teruel and Zaragoza in the region of Aragon
- Type: Vino de la Tierra
- Country: Spain

Bajo Aragón is a Spanish geographical indication for Vino de la Tierra wines located in and near Lower Aragon, in the autonomous region of Aragon. Vino de la Tierra is one step below the mainstream Denominación de Origen indication on the Spanish wine quality ladder.

The area covered by this geographical indication comprises about 50 municipalities in the province of Teruel (Aragon, Spain) and about 25 in the province of Zaragoza (Aragón, Spain).

It acquired its Vino de la Tierra status in 2006.

== Grape varieties ==
- White: Macabeo, Chardonnay and Garnacha blanca
- Red: Mazuela, Cabernet Sauvignon, Merlot, Tempranillo, Garnacha tinta, Derechero and Syrah
