= Costa de Cantabria =

Spanish geographical indication for wines

Costa de Cantabria VdlT
- Wine region
- Costa de Cantabria VdlT in the region of Cantabria
- Type: Vino de la tierra
- Country: Spain

Costa de Cantabria is a Spanish geographical indication for vino de la tierra wines located in the autonomous region of Cantabria, on the north coast of Spain. Vino de la tierra is one step below the mainstream denominación de origen indication on the Spanish wine quality ladder.

The area covered by this geographical indication comprises the municipalities in Cantabria located between the Atlantic or Cantabrian Sea coast and the Picos de Europa mountain range. It specifically excludes the municipalities already covered by the Liébana vino de la tierra geographic indication.

The vineyards are located mainly in the municipalities of Valle de Villaverde, Vidular, Bárcena de Cicero and Esles.

It acquired its vino de la tierra status in 2005.

== Grape varieties ==
Red: Ondarrabi belza and Verdejo Negro

White: Godello, Verdejo, Albillo, Chardonnay, Malvasía, Hondarrabi Zuri and Picapoll Blanco
