= Ibiza (disambiguation) =

Ibiza may refer to:

== Places ==
- Ibiza, a Spanish island in the Mediterranean Sea, part of the Balearic Islands archipelago
- Ibiza (city), a city and municipality located on the southeast coast of the island of Ibiza

== Entertainment ==
- Ibiza (film)
- "Ibiza" (Philipp Kirkorov and Nikolay Baskov song), 2018
- "Ibiza" (The Prodigy song), 2015
- "Ibiza", a song by El Loco from A Bugged Out Mix by Miss Kittin, 2006
- "Ibiza", a song by Grupo Frontera from Jugando a Que No Pasa Nada, 2024
- "Ibiza", an instrumental by Jaared from Hangtime, 2002
- "Ibiza", a song by José Feliciano, 1989
- "Ibiza", a song by José Guardiola, 1961
- "Ibiza", a song by Tyga, 2020

== Other uses ==
- Ibiza (Madrid Metro), a station on Line 9 of the Madrid Metro
- SEAT Ibiza, a supermini car manufactured by SEAT since 1984
- Ibiza (Vino de la Tierra), a Spanish geographical indication for wines in the Balearic Islands
