= Serra de Tramuntana-Costa Nord =

Serra de Tramuntana-Costa Nord VdlT
- Wine region
- Serra de Tramuntana-Costa Nord VdlT in the region of the Balearic Islands
- Type: Vino de la Tierra
- Country: Spain

VdlT wine regions of the Balearic Islands

Serra de Tramuntana-Costa Nord is a Spanish geographical indication for Vino de la Tierra wines located on the north coast of the island of Mallorca in the autonomous region of the Balearic Islands, Spain. Vino de la Tierra is one step below the mainstream Denominación de Origen indication on the Spanish wine quality ladder.

18 municipalities are covered by the region, around 40 hectares and 5 wineries (bodegas) are registered with the Regulatory Body.

It acquired its Vino de la Tierra status in 2007.

== Grape varieties ==
- Red: Cabernet Sauvignon, Merlot, Syrah, Monastrell, Tempranillo, Callet and Manto negro
- White: Malvasía, Moscatel, Moll, Parellada, Macabeo, Chardonnay and Sauvignon blanc
