= Jiloca =

Jiloca may refer to:

- Jiloca River, a river in Spain
- Jiloca Comarca, a comarca in Aragon, Spain
- Ribera del Jiloca, a Spanish geographical indication for Vino de la Tierra wines located in the wine-producing area of the Jiloca Valley
