= Utiel-Requena =

Spanish wine producing region

Coordinates: 39°30′22.17″N 1°10′51.7″W

Utiel - Requena DOP
- Wine region
- Utiel - Requena DOP in the province of Valencia in the region of Valencia
- Official name: D.O.P. Utiel - Requena
- Type: Denominación de Origen Protegida (DOP)
- Year established: 1932
- Country: Spain
- Size of planted vineyards: 34,510 hectares (85,276 acres)
- No. of wineries: 59
- Wine produced: 327,842 hectolitres
- Comments: Data for 2016 / 2017

Utiel Requena is a Spanish Denominación de Origen Protegida (DOP) for wines located in the province of Valencia (Valencian Community). It takes its name from the two neighbouring towns of Utiel and Requena. It is renowned for the predominant use of the Bobal grape variety.

== History ==
Archaeological finds in ancient Iberian settlements such as the one at Los Villares show that grape growing and wine production in the area dates from at least the 7th century BC.

In the 1st century BC, the ancient Romans, after defeating the Carthaginians, settled the area and introduced new wine making techniques.

During the Moorish dominion of the Iberian Peninsula, wine production was tolerated, even though it was forbidden by the Koran.

The first written references to vineyards and wine date from the 15th century. During the course of the 17th and 18th centuries, population and the areas under vineyards increased, and some distilleries are known to have operated.

The 19th century was the golden age for the Utiel-Requena area as the number of vineyards increased even more. In 1847, communications with the port of Valencia were improved and in 1887 a railway line connected Utiel with Valencia. The renowned Bodega Redonda (Redonda Winery) dates from this time, strategically located next to the railway station in Utiel, and today is the seat of the Utiel-Requena DOP Regulatory Council (Consejo Regulador).

Exports were significant as the French vineyards were affected by oidium during the decade 1852 to 1862, and then were struck by the phylloxera virus from 1868 onwards along with the rest of Europe. The vineyards of Utiel-Requena escaped the devastating effects of the phylloxera virus because they were planted with the Bobal grape variety, which is more resistant to it than other varieties. This gave producers the chance to replace their vines by grafting varietals onto New World rootstock.

In 1965 the first cooperative was founded with the purpose of bottling and aging wines. There are currently over 100 wineries registered with the DOP, which was created in 1932.

== Geography ==
The DOP is located in the transition zone between the Mediterranean coast and high plateau (La Mancha) of Central Spain. The whole area slopes down slightly from northwest to southeast. The vineyards are located between two rivers: the Turia and the Cabriel.

== Soils ==
The soils are dark in colour with a high lime content, permeable and poor in organic matter.

== Climate ==
The climate is not only continental (long hot, dry summers and cold winters) but one of the most severe of all the Spanish grape growing regions. Frosts and hailstones are frequent in winter and drought common in summer. Temperatures can reach a maximum of 40°C in summer and drop to a minimum of -10°C in winter. Nevertheless, the vines are well adapted to such a climate and there is a Mediterranean influence due to the closeness of the sea (only 70 km as the crow flies) and the cool wind, known as the Solano, helps to keep temperatures down.

Rainfall is sparse, about 450 mm per year and the vines receive about 2,800 hours of sunlight per year.

== Grapes ==
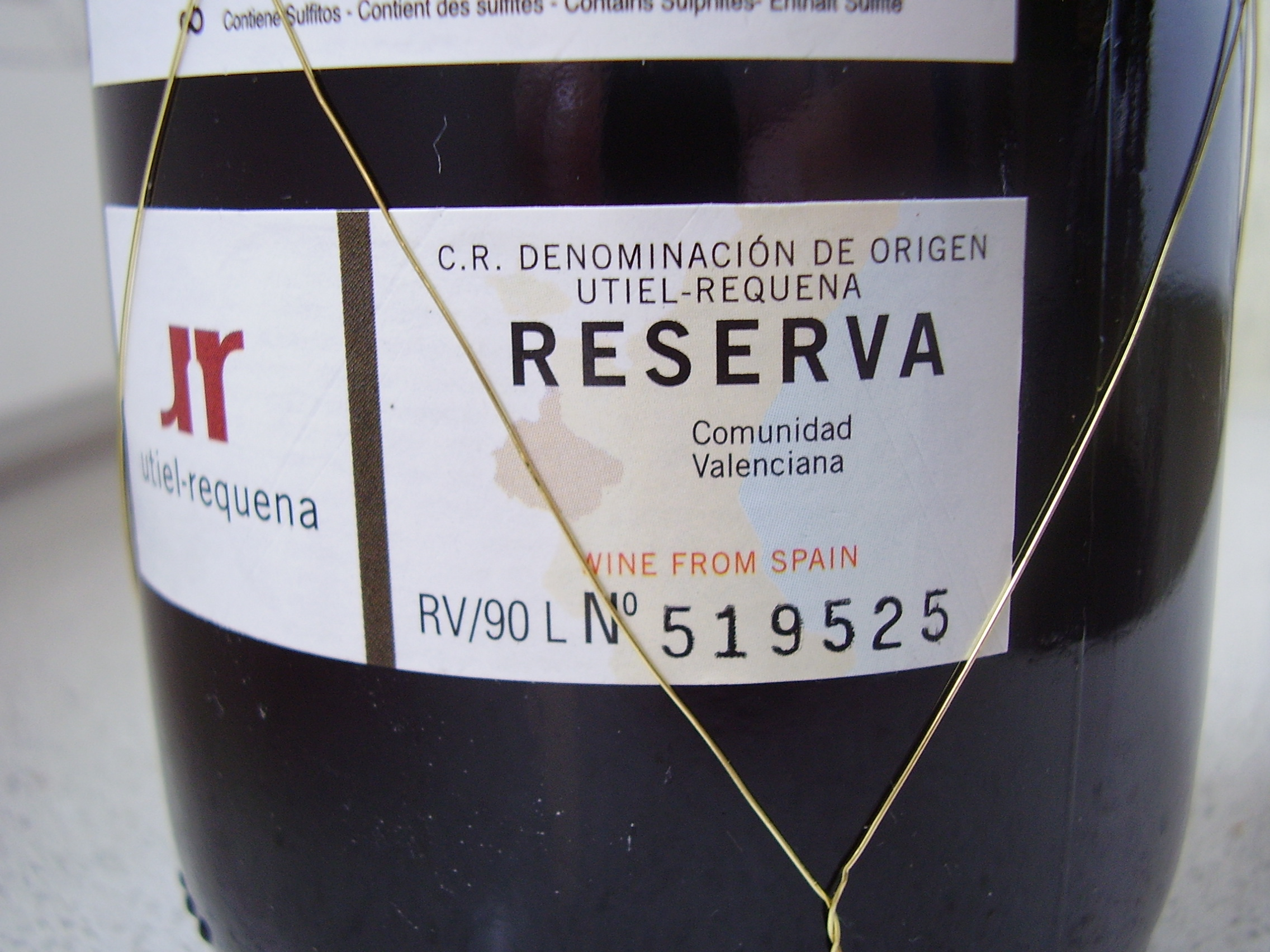
Utiel Requena DOP reserva wine bottle label, Spain

The Bobal grape variety occupies over 80% of the vineyards. Bobal is the second most planted red grape variety in Spain. Planting density is between 1,600 vines/ha and the maximum of 4,000 vines/ha.

The authorized grape varieties are:

- Red: Bobal, Tempranillo, Garnacha Tinta, Garnacha Tintorera, Cabernet Sauvignon, Merlot, Syrah, Pinot Noir, Petit Verdot, Cabernet Franc.
- White: Planta Nova (or Tardana), Macabeo, Merseguera, Chardonnay, Sauvignon Blanc, Parellada, Verdejo, Moscatel de Grano Menudo.
