= Rioja DOCa =

Spanish wine region

Coordinates: 42°27′N 2°26′W

- Wine region
- Rioja DOCa in the regions of La Rioja, Navarre and in the province of Álava, in the Basque Country
- Official name: Denominación de Origen Calificada Rioja / Denominación de Origen Protegida Rioja
- Type: Denominación de Origen Calificada
- Country: Spain
- Sub-regions: Rioja Alta; Rioja Oriental; Rioja Alavesa
- Size of planted vineyards: 65,326 hectares (161,424 acres)
- No. of vineyards: 16,413
- Varietals produced: Tempranillo, Viura, Garnacha, Graciano, Mazuelo
- No. of wineries: 673
- Wine produced: 3,173,106 hectolitres
- Comments: Data for 2016 / 2017

Rioja (pronounced [ˈrjoxa]) is a wine region in Spain, with denominación de origen calificada (D.O.Ca., 'Qualified Designation of Origin', the highest category in Spanish wine regulation). Rioja wine is made from grapes grown in the autonomous communities of La Rioja and Navarre, and the Basque province of Álava. Rioja is further subdivided into three zones: Rioja Alta, Rioja Oriental and Rioja Alavesa. Many wines have traditionally blended fruit from all three regions, though there is a slow growth in single-zone wines.

== History ==
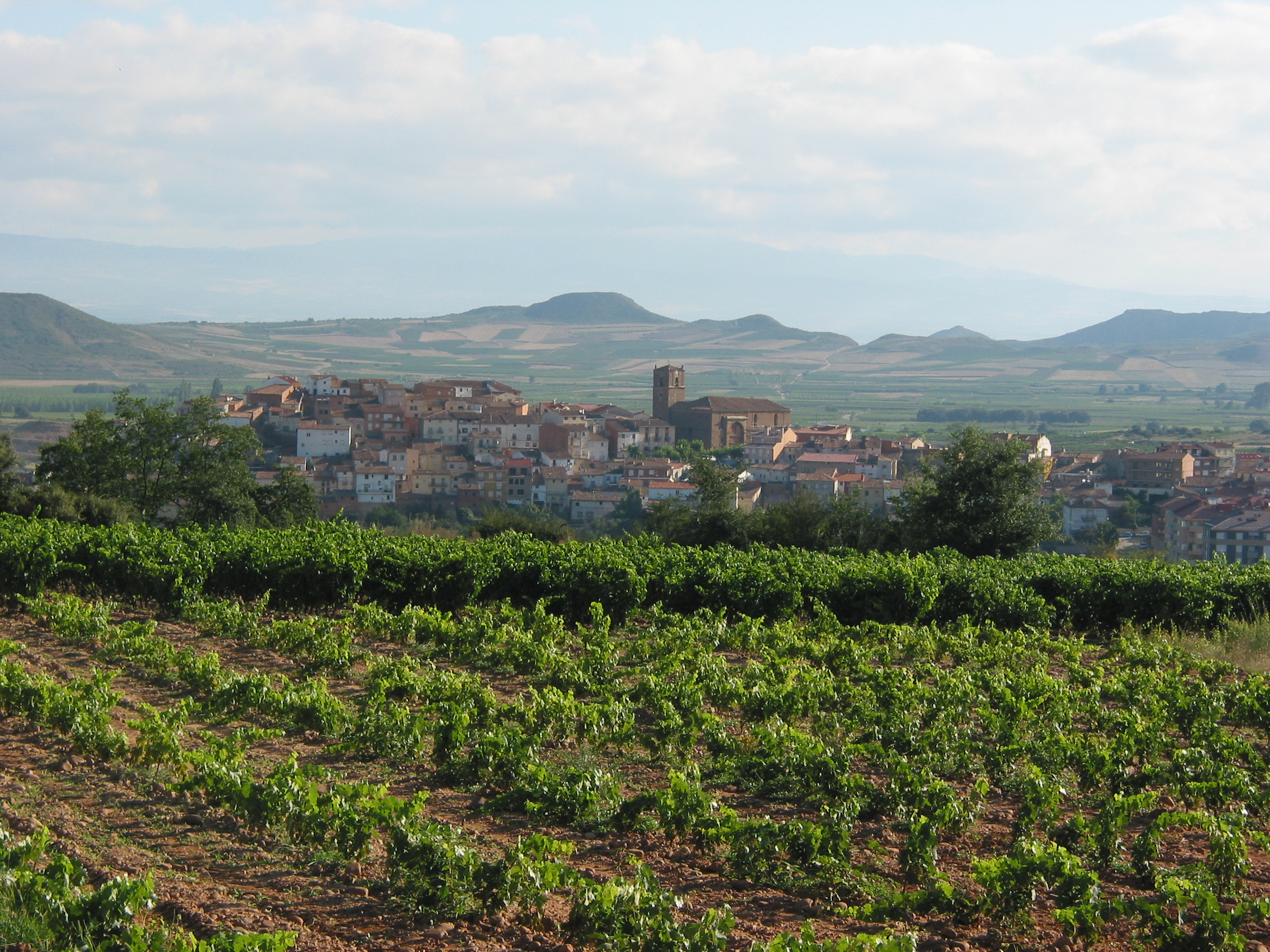
La Rioja DOCa vineyards with the village of Entrena in the middleground

- The harvesting of wine in La Rioja has an ancient lineage with origins dating back to the Phoenicians and the Celtiberians.
- The earliest written evidence of the existence of the grape in La Rioja dates to 873, in the form of a document from the Public Notary of San Millán dealing with a donation to the San Andrés de Trepeana (Treviana) Monastery. As was the case in many Mediterranean lands in mediaeval times, monks were the main practitioners of winemaking in La Rioja and great advocates of its virtues.
- Vineyards occupied the usual part of rural landscapes in medieval Rioja during the High Middle Ages (10th–13th century)
- In the year 1063, the first documented report of viticulture in La Rioja appears in the "Carta de población de Longares" (Letter to the Settlers of Longares).
- The King of Navarra and Aragon gave the first legal recognition of Rioja wine in 1102
- There are proofs of Rioja wine export towards other regions as early as the late 13th century, which testifies the beginnings of a commercial production.
- In the thirteenth century, Gonzalo de Berceo, clergyman of the Suso Monastery in San Millán de la Cogolla (La Rioja) and Spain's earliest known poet, mentions the wine in some of his works.
- From the 15th century on, the Rioja Alta specialized in wine growing.
- In 1560, harvesters from Longares chose a symbol to represent the quality of the wines.
- In 1635, the mayor of Logroño prohibited the passing of carts through streets near wine cellars, in case the vibrations caused a deterioration of the quality of the wine.
- In 1650, the first document to protect the quality of Rioja wines was drawn up.
- In 1790, at the inaugural meeting of the Real Sociedad Económica de Cosecheros de La Rioja (Royal Economic Society of Rioja Winegrowers), many initiatives as to how to construct, fix, and maintain the roads and other forms of access for transportation of wine were discussed. The Society was established to promote the cultivation and commercialisation of Rioja wines and 52 Rioja localities participated.
- In 1852, Luciano Murrieta (es) created the first fine wine of the Duque de la Victoria area, having learned the process in Bordeaux.
- In 1892, the Viticulture and Enology Station of Haro was founded for quality-control purposes.
- In 1902, a Royal Decree determining the origin of Rioja wines is promulgated.
- The Consejo Regulador (Regulating Council) was created in 1926 with the objective of limiting the zones of production, expanding the warranty of the wine and controlling the use of the name "Rioja".
- This Council became legally structured in 1945 and was finally inaugurated in 1953.
- In 1970, the Regulations for denominación de origen were approved as well as Regulations for the Regulating Council.
- In 1991, the prestigious "Calificada" (Qualified) nomination was awarded to La Rioja, making it Spain's first denominación de origen calificada (DOCa).
- In 2008, the Regulating Council for the La Rioja Denomination of Origin created a new logo to go on all bottles of wine produced under this designation. From now on bottles of wine from the La Rioja Qualified Denomination of Origin will no longer bear the familiar logo. In an attempt to appeal to younger wine-lovers, the long-standing logo will now be replaced with a brighter, more modern logo with cleaner lines. The aim is to reflect the new, modern aspects of wine-growing in La Rioja without detracting from the traditional wines. In theory, the new logo represents a Tempranillo vine symbolising "heritage, creativity and dynamism".
- In 2017, the DOCa Rioja, in this process of continuous improvement, enriched its current offer by regularizing and incorporating new indications (Singular Vineyards, Zone Wines, Municipality Wines, Quality Sparkling White and Sparkling Wines) with the traditional aging ones.
- In 2018, Rioja launched its new global brand message, 'Saber quién eres', where tradition, diversity and origin become protagonist attributes.

== Sub-regions ==
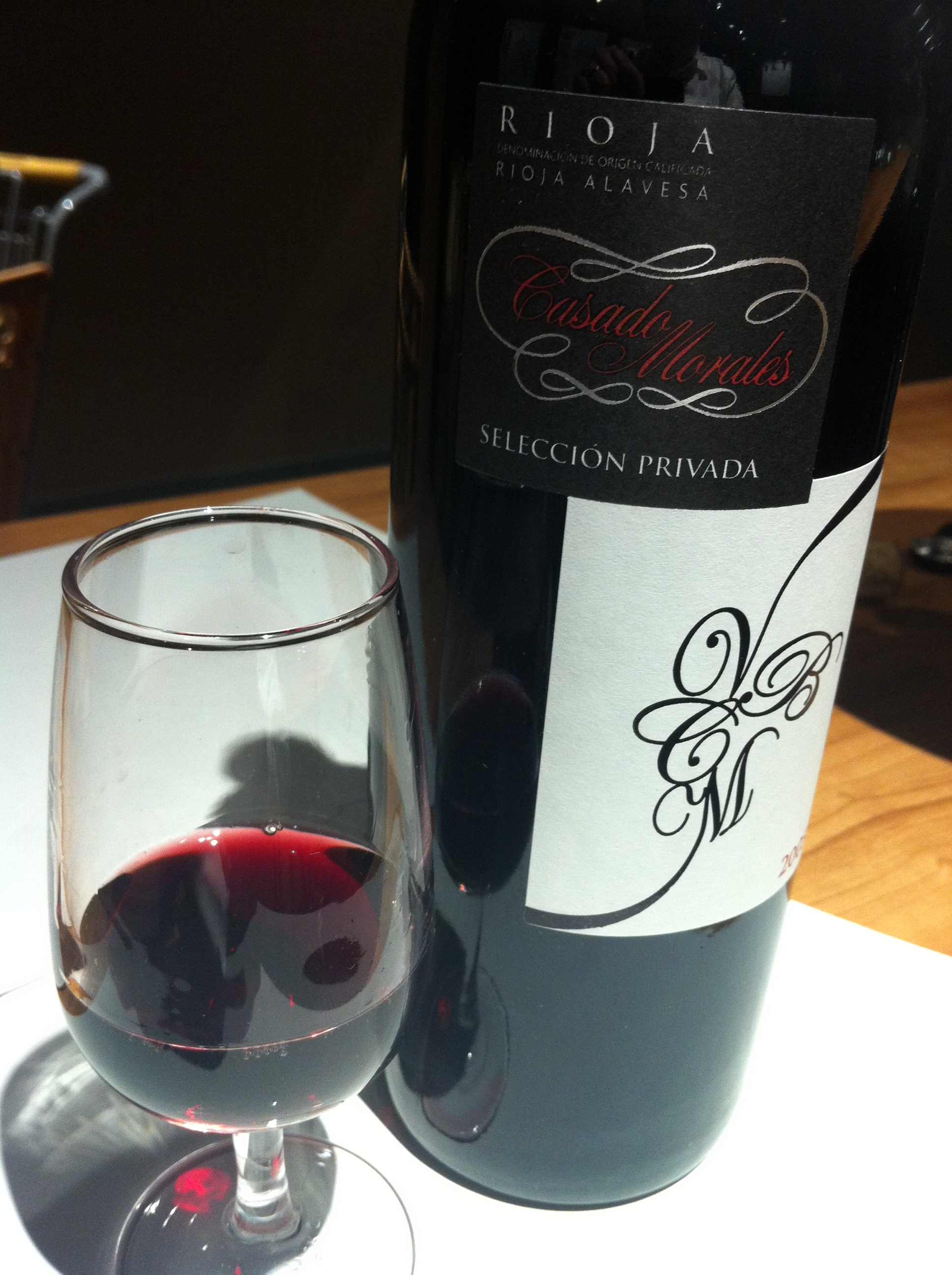
A wine from the Rioja Alavesa region

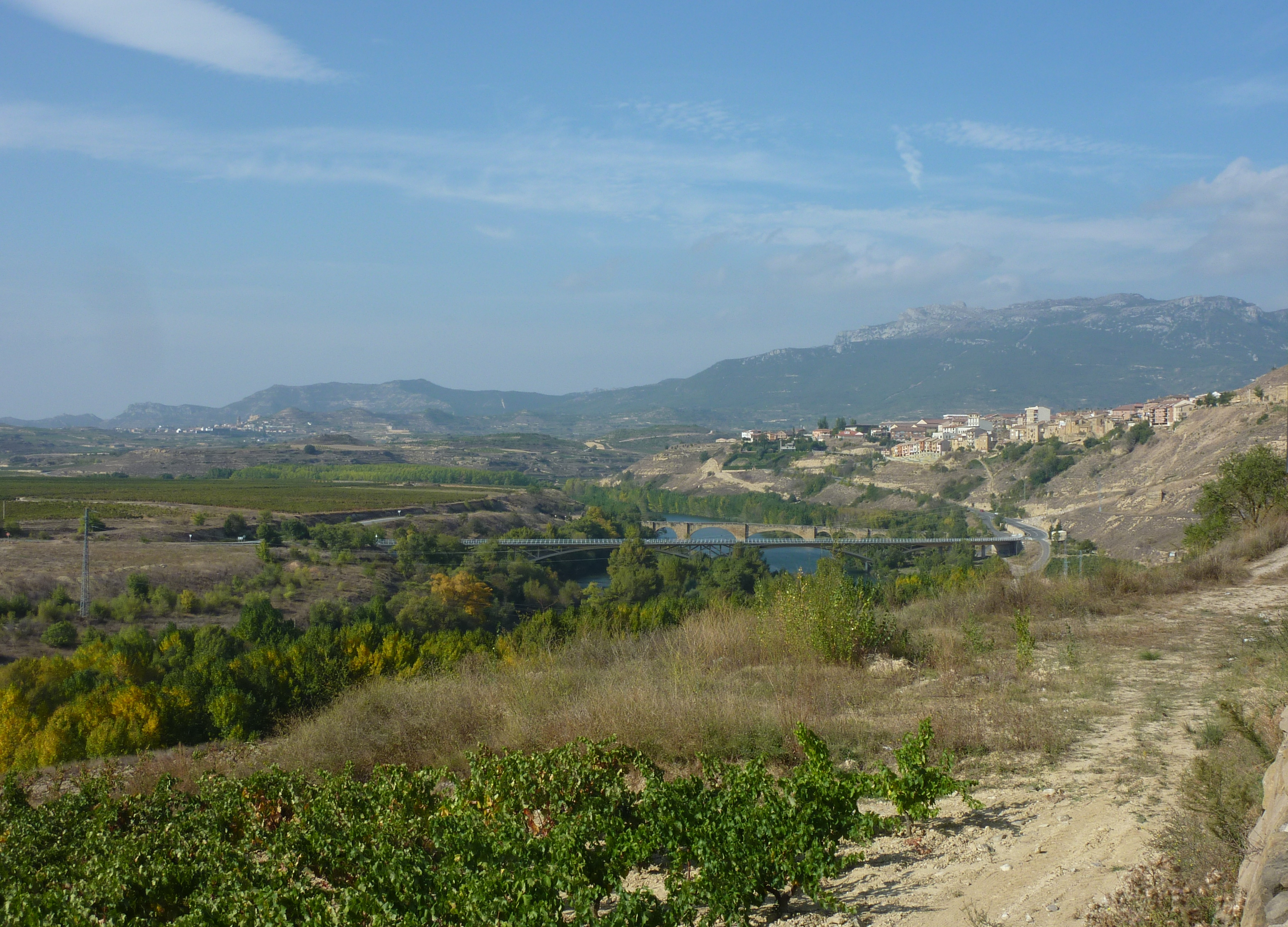
Rioja Alta and Ebro

=== Rioja Alta ===
Located on the western edge of the region and at higher elevations than the other areas, the Rioja Alta is known more for its "old world" style of wine. A higher elevation equates to a shorter growing season, which in turn produces brighter fruit flavors and a wine that is lighter on the palate.

=== Rioja Alavesa ===
The region of Rioja Alavesa is in the province of Álava in the Basque Country, on the northern bank of the River Ebro. Despite sharing a similar climate as the Alta region, the Rioja Alavesa produces wines with a fuller body and higher acidity. Vineyards in the area have a low vine density with large spacing between rows. This is due to the relatively poor conditions of the soil with the vines needing more distance from each other and less competition for the nutrients in the surrounding soil.

=== Rioja Oriental (formerly Rioja Baja) ===
Unlike the more continental climate of the Alta and Alavesa, the Rioja Oriental is strongly influenced by a Mediterranean climate which makes this area the warmest and driest of the Rioja. In the summer months, drought can be a significant viticultural hazard, though since the late 1990s irrigation has been permitted. Temperatures in the summer typically reach 35 °C (95 °F). A number of the vineyards are actually located in nearby Navarra but the wine produced from those grapes belongs to the Rioja appellation. Unlike the typically pale Rioja wine, Oriental wines are very deeply coloured and can be highly alcoholic. They typically do not have much acidity or aroma and are generally used as blending components with wines from other parts of the Rioja.

== Grapes ==
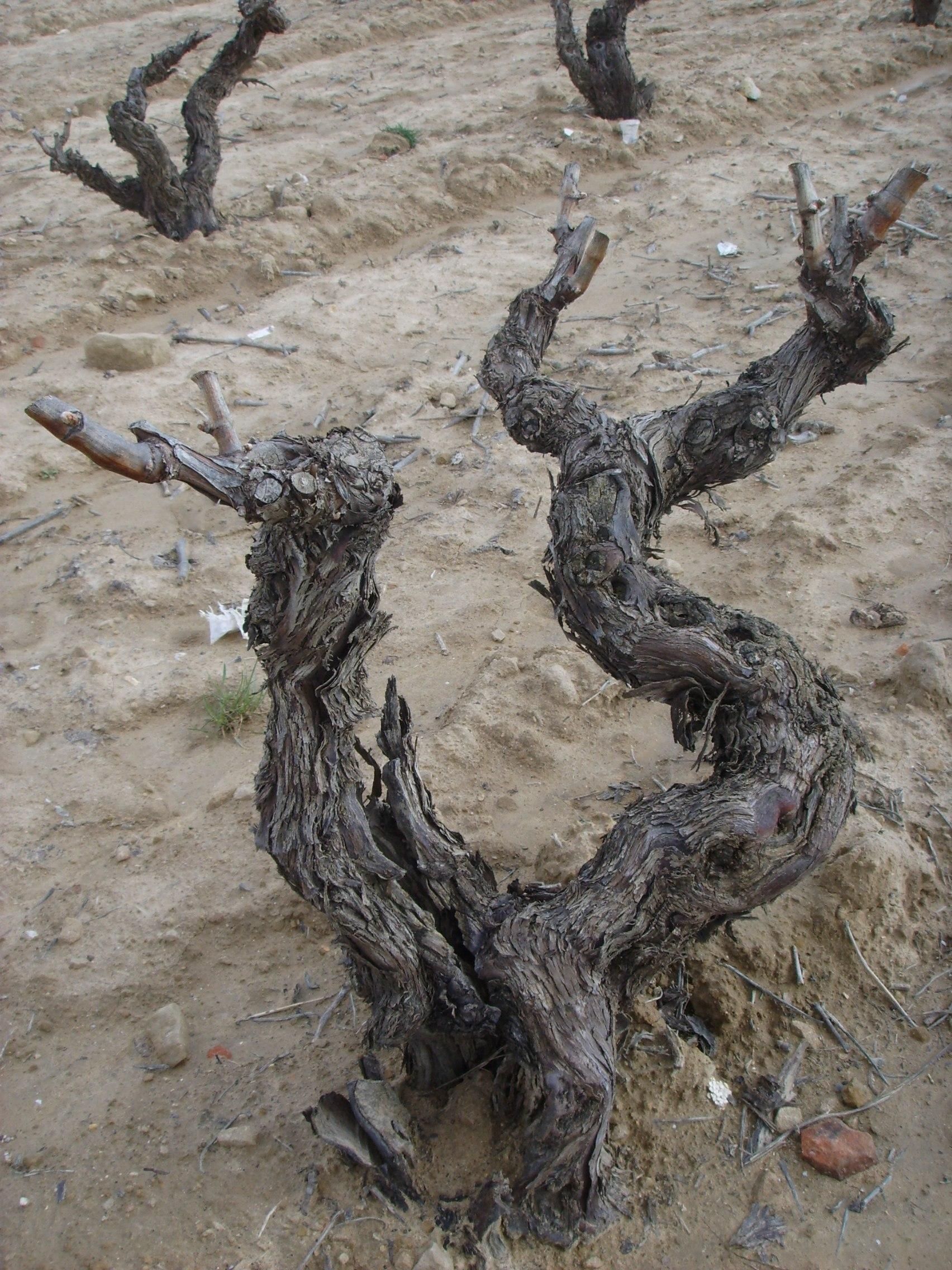
The "old vines" of the Alavesa regions can produce very concentrated grapes but in low yields.

=== Traditional varieties ===
The traditional varieties authorized by the Regulating Council of the D.O.Ca. Rioja since its foundation in 1925 have been seven, four red and three white:

- Red varieties: Tempranillo, Garnacha tinta, Mazuelo (also known as Cariñena) and Graciano.
- White varieties: Viura (also known as Macabeo), Malvasía and Garnacha blanca.

=== New authorized varieties ===
In 2007, the Regulating Council of the D.O.Ca. Rioja authorized, for the first time since 1925, the incorporation of some additional varieties within the limits of the denomination, changes that were reflected in two modifications of the existing Regulation approved in 2004: BOE-A-2008-4991 and BOE -A-2009-8950, but this has been subject to subsequent amendment.

The currently permitted additional varieties are the following:

- Indigenous red varieties: Maturana tinta, (also called Maturana parda or Maturano)
- White varieties:
  - Autochthonous varieties: Maturana blanca, Tempranillo blanco and Turruntés or Torrontés (not the same as the varieties named Torrontés cultivated in other parts of Spain and the rest of the world).
  - Foreign varieties: Chardonnay, Sauvignon blanc and Verdejo.

These new authorized varieties can only be planted in substitution, so as not to increase the vegetable mass of the Denomination.

In the case of the new autochthonous varieties, both red and white, no limit is set on the percentage that the wines must carry, which is why the production of single varietal wines of these grapes is allowed. On the contrary, in the foreign white varieties (Chardonnay, Sauvignon blanc and Verdejo) it is established that they can not be the predominant ones in the final composition of the wine. Therefore, if the varieties are indicated on the label, the autochthonous white variety (Viura, Garnacha blanca, Malvasía de Rioja, Maturana blanca, Tempranillo blanco or Turruntés) must always be listed first.

The incorporation of these new varieties was made with the aim of recovering Rioja's viticultural heritage, in the case of autochthonous grapes, and to increase the competitiveness of Rioja whites in the international market, in the case of foreign white varieties.

== Cultivated area ==
The area cultivated in 2018, in hectares, according to the grape varieties and by Autonomous Communities is as follows:

Varieties	La Rioja	Álava	Navarra	Total of varieties by Autonomous Communities
Tempranillo	35,058.15	11,895.18	5,489.51	52,442.83
Garnacha	3,984.03	101.06	449.30	4,534.39
Mazuelo	889.62	97.26	253.39	1,240.27
Graciano	820.08	167.68	297.03	1,284.80
Maturana tinta	140.78	22.29	18.51	181.58
Others Red	78.56	33.77	22.37	134.70
Total Red	40,971.22	12,317.24	6,530.11	59,818.57
Viura	3,139.06	824.86	201.63	4,165.55
Malvasía	101.82	21.29	10.66	133.76
Garnacha blanca	156.67	7.82	53.10	217.60
Tempranillo blanco	602.75	32.03	116.52	751.30
Maturana blanca	33.84	0.22	0.99	35.06
Verdejo	207.37	2.07	118.07	327.51
Turruntés	5.08	0.01	0	5.09
Chardonnay	112.03	6.16	31.98	150.18
Sauvignon Blanc	161.84	16.03	21.74	199.60
Other Whites	34.75	1.12	0.69	36.56
Total White	4,555.22	911.60	555.39	6,022.21
Total Varieties	45,526.43	13,228.83	7,085.50	65,840.77

As can be seen, red grapes represent 90.85% and white grapes represent 9.15%.

The red grapes are distributed as follows: Tempranillo: 87.67%, Garnacha: 7.58%, Mazuelo: 2.07%, Graciano: 2.15%, Maturana tinta: 0.30% and others: 0.23%.

The percentage among whites is determined as follows: Viura: 69.17%, Malvasia: 2.22%, Garnacha blanca: 3.61%, Tempranillo blanco: 12.48%, Maturana blanca: 0.58%, Verdejo: 5, 44%, Turruntés: 0.08%, Chardonnay: 2.49%, Sauvignon Blanc: 3.31% and others: 0.61%.

== Viticulture ==
The pruning consists in forming the stump with three arms and two thumbs in each arm. Each thumb will have two buds from which the shoots will sprout. The grape harvest is done manually in the month of October. To ensure quality, the quantity is restricted to 6,500 kg / ha for red varieties and 9,000 kg / ha for white.

== Production ==
=== Proportion of varieties according to the type of wine ===
Traditionally, Rioja wine has been made by assembling different types of grape varieties, although nowadays it is also very common to find monovarietal wines.

In accordance with the Regulation of the D.O.Ca. Rioja (BOE-A-2004-1838410) and its latest modification (BOE-A-2009-895014), the different types of wine must use the authorised varieties in the following proportions:

- Red wines: In red wines made from shelled grapes, at least 95% of the Tempranillo, Garnacha tinta, Graciano, Mazuelo and Maturana tinta varieties must be used. In red wines made from whole grapes, this percentage will be at least 85%.
- White wines: Only grapes of the varieties Viura, Garnacha blanca, Malvasía, Maturana blanca, Tempranillo blanco and Turruntés will be used. Grapes of the Chardonnay, Sauvignon Blanc and Verdejo varieties can also be used as long as they are not the predominant variety in the final product.
- Rosé wines: A minimum of 25% of Tempranillo, Garnacha tinta, Graciano, Mazuelo and Maturana tinta grapes will be used. Where Chardonnay, Sauvignon Blanc or Verdejo varieties are used, they cannot be the predominant variety in the final product.

=== Production methods ===
- Red wines. There are two methods of production: the one of carbonic maceration (traditional of the harvesters, for its early commerce) and another one in which the stem of the cluster is eliminated before the fermentation (used by the winery companies, to destine them to crianza).
- White wines. The grape passes entirely to the drainer, the scrapes and skins are eliminated, and the grape juice obtained enters the tanks for fermentation.
- Pink wines. The grapes pass to the destemmed and slightly wrung-out dripper, proceeding to the maceration of the liquid with the skins. The grape juice obtained is decanted before entering the fermentation tanks.

== Classification ==
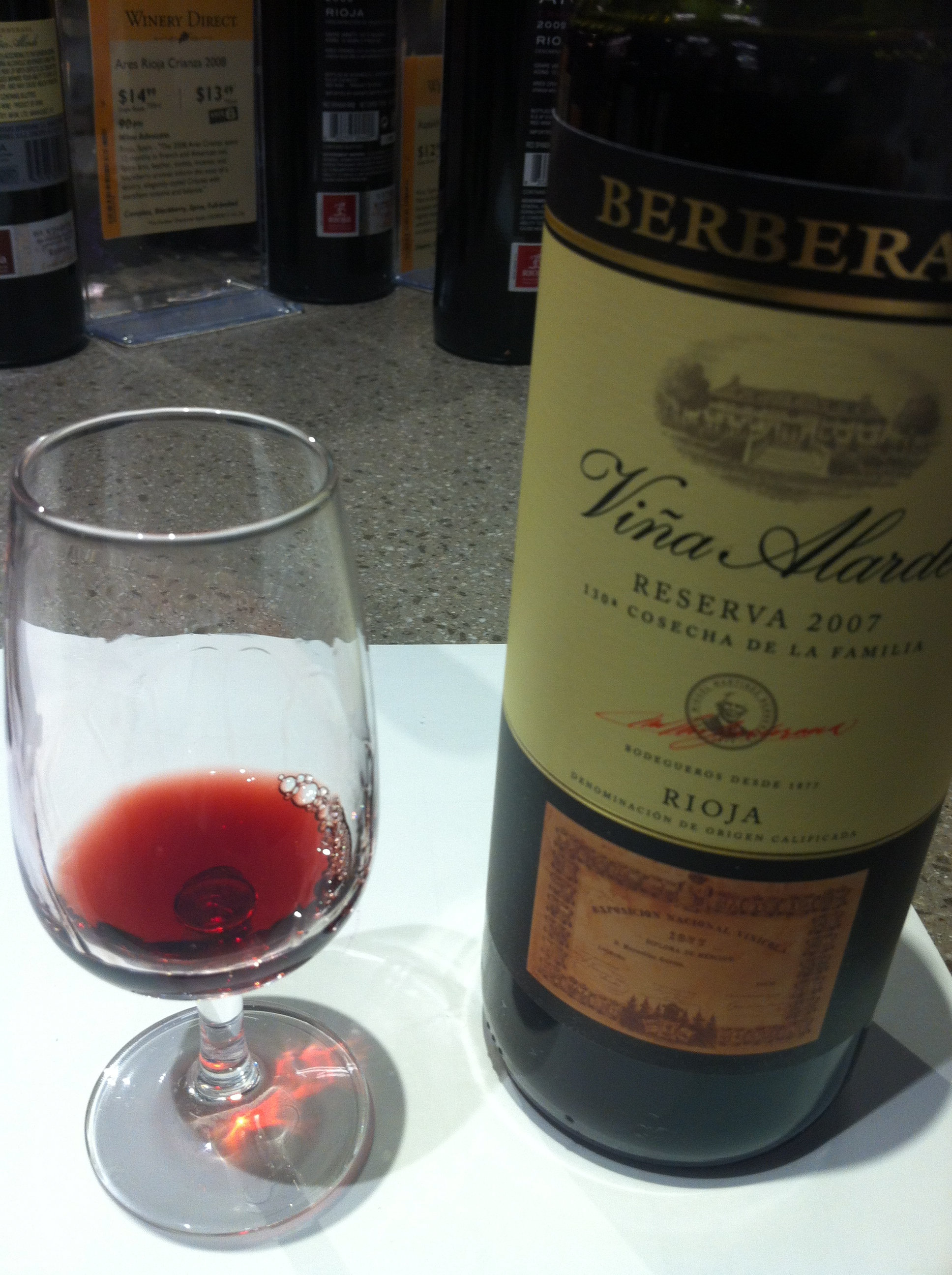
A Reserva designated Rioja wine

The aging is carried out in 225-litre oak barrels for a period ranging from 1 to 3 years, and later in the bottle itself for a period of 6 months to 6 years.

Depending on the time the wine remains in the barrel it is classified as:

- Crianza:
  - In red wines, the period of aging in oak barrels and bottles must be a minimum of two calendar years from 1 October of the year of the harvest in question, followed and complemented by aging in the bottle. The minimum time that the wine must remain in the barrel is one year.
  - In the case of whites and rosés, the total time is the same as for reds, but only a minimum of six months in barrels is mandatory.
- Reserva:
  - In red wines, the period of aging in oak barrels and bottles must be a minimum of thirty-six months, with a minimum aging period of twelve months in oak barrels.
  - In the case of whites and rosés, the total time between aging in oak barrels and bottles must be a minimum period of twenty-four months, with a minimum aging period of six months in oak barrels.
- Gran Reserva:
  - In red wines, the time must have a minimum of time in barrel of twenty-four months, followed and supplemented with an aging in bottle period of at least thirty-six months.
  - In the case of whites and rosés: aging in oak barrels and bottles for a total period of at least forty-eight months, with a minimum aging period in oak barrels of six months.

In 2018, the Regulating Council released new classification rules for Rioja, in an attempt to encourage championship of regional microclimates and put a greater focus on singular vineyard sites. This amended system, similar to Burgundy grading, moves Rioja from being focused primarily on aging and oaking to a more all encompassing system inspecting the terroir of the wine – such as allowing labels to display the village or municipality of origin on the front label.

== Crop qualifications ==
The harvest ratings of the D.O.Ca. Rioja granted by its Regulating Council since its founding in 1926 are the following:

- 1925 Muy buena
- 1926 Mediana
- 1927 Mediana
- 1928 Muy buena
- 1929 Normal
- 1930 Mediana
- 1931 Muy buena
- 1932 Normal
- 1933 Normal
- 1934 Excelente
- 1935 Muy buena
- 1936 Normal
- 1937 Normal
- 1938 Mediana
- 1939 Normal
- 1940 Normal
- 1941 Buena
- 1942 Muy buena
- 1943 Buena
- 1944 Buena
- 1945 Buena
- 1946 Normal
- 1947 Muy buena
- 1948 Excelente
- 1949 Muy buena
- 1950 Normal
- 1951 Normal
- 1952 Excelente
- 1953 Mediana
- 1954 Buena
- 1955 Excelente
- 1956 Buena
- 1957 Normal
- 1958 Excelente
- 1959 Muy buena
- 1960 Buena
- 1961 Buena
- 1962 Muy buena
- 1963 Normal
- 1964 Excelente
- 1965 Mediana
- 1966 Normal
- 1967 Normal
- 1968 Muy buena
- 1969 Normal
- 1970 Muy buena
- 1971 Mediana
- 1972 Mediana
- 1973 Buena
- 1974 Buena
- 1975 Muy buena
- 1976 Buena
- 1977 Normal
- 1978 Muy buena
- 1979 Normal
- 1980 Buena
- 1981 Muy buena
- 1982 Excelente
- 1983 Buena
- 1984 Normal
- 1985 Buena
- 1986 Buena
- 1987 Muy buena
- 1988 Buena
- 1989 Buena
- 1990 Buena
- 1991 Muy buena
- 1992 Buena
- 1993 Buena
- 1994 Excelente
- 1995 Excelente
- 1996 Muy buena
- 1997 Buena
- 1998 Muy buena
- 1999 Buena
- 2000 Buena
- 2001 Excelente
- 2002 Buena
- 2003 Buena
- 2004 Excelente
- 2005 Excelente
- 2006 Muy buena
- 2007 Muy buena
- 2008 Muy buena
- 2009 Muy buena
- 2010 Excelente
- 2011 Excelente
- 2012 Muy buena
- 2013 Buena
- 2014 Buena
- 2015 Muy buena
- 2016 Muy buena
- 2017 Muy buena
- 2018 Buena
- 2019 Excelente
- 2020 Muy buena
- 2021 Muy buena
- 2022 Muy buena

== Winemaking and styles ==
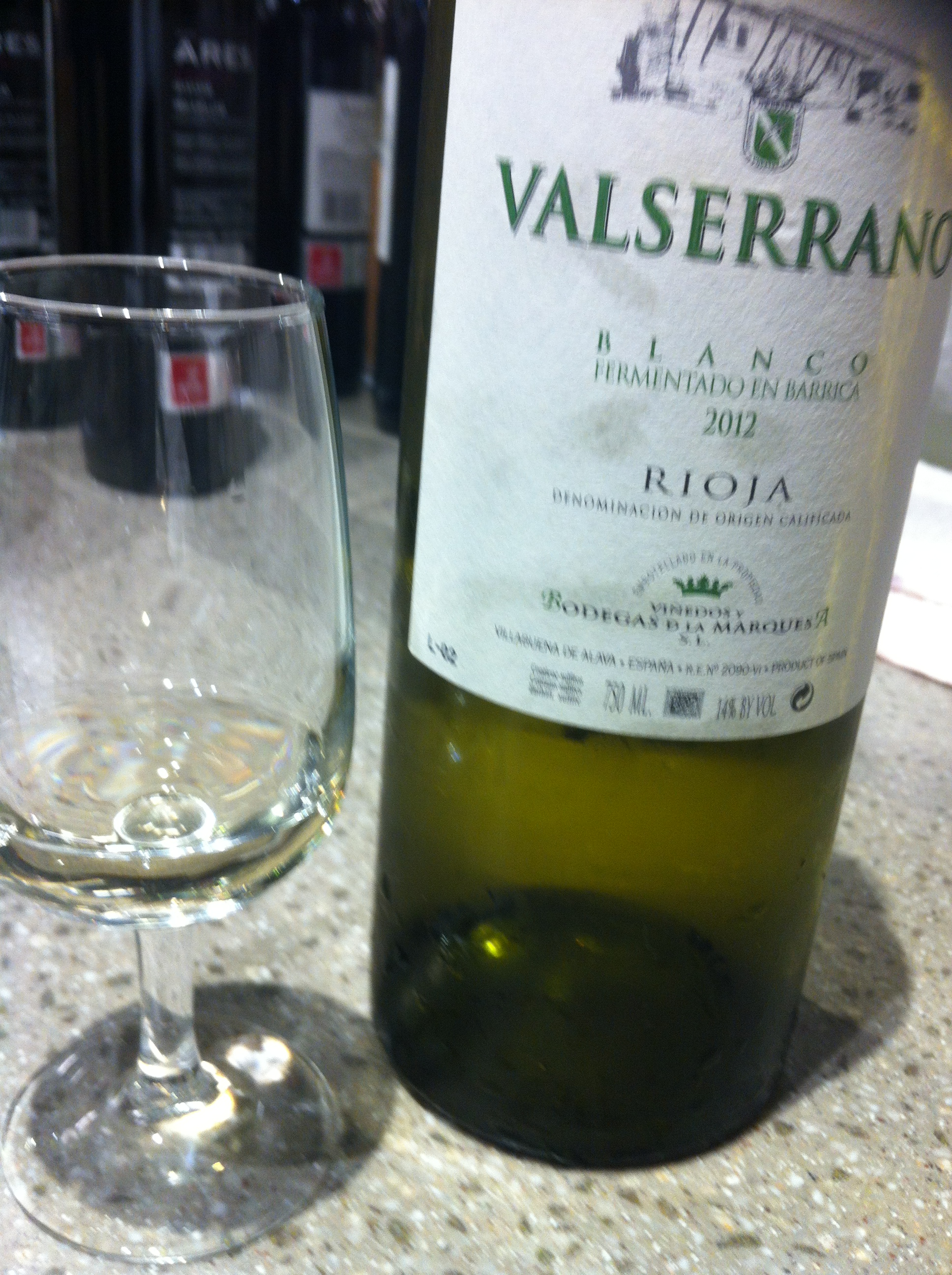
A white Rioja made mostly from Viura

A distinct characteristic of Rioja wine is the effect of oak aging. First introduced in the early 18th century by Bordeaux influenced winemakers, the use of oak and the pronounced vanilla flavors in the wines has been a virtual trademark of the region though some modern winemakers are experimenting with making wines less influenced by oak. Originally French oak was used but as the cost of the barrels increased many bodegas began to buy American oak planks and fashion them into barrels at Spanish cooperages in a style more closely resembling the French method. This included hand splitting the wood, rather than sawing, and allowing the planks time to dry and "season" in the outdoors versus drying in the kiln. In recent times, more bodegas have begun using French oak again and many will age wines in both American and French oak for blending purposes.

In the past, it was not uncommon for some bodegas to age their red wines for 15–20 years or even more before their release. One notable example of this the Marqués de Murrieta which released its 1942 vintage gran reserva in 1983 after 41 years of aging. Today most bodegas have shifted their winemaking focus to wines that are ready to drink sooner, with the top wines typically aging for 4–8 years prior to release, though some traditionalists still age longer. The typical bodega owns anywhere from 10,000 to 40,000 oak barrels.

The use of oak in white wine has declined significantly in recent times when before the norm was traditionally 2–5 years in oak. This created slightly oxidized wines with flavors of caramel, coffee, and roasted nuts that did not appeal to a large market of consumers with some of the more negative examples showing characteristics of rubber and petrol flavors. Today the focus of white wine makers has been to enhance the vibrancy and fruit flavors of the wine.

Some winemakers utilize a derivative of carbonic maceration in which whole clusters are placed in large open vats and allowed to ferment inside the individual grape berries, without the addition of yeast, for a few days before they are crushed.

In the 1960s, Bodegas Rioja Santiago developed the first bottled version of the wine punch Sangría, based on Rioja wine, and exhibited it at the 1964 New York World's Fair. An import subsidiary of Pepsi Cola purchased the rights to the wine and began marketing it worldwide.

== Wineries ==
In Spain, wineries are commonly referred to as bodegas though this term may also refer to a wine cellar or warehouse. For quite some time, the Rioja wine industry has been dominated by local family vineyards and co-operatives that have bought the grapes and make the wine. Some bodegas would buy fermented wine from the co-ops and age the wine to sell under their own label. In recent times there has been more emphasis on securing vineyard land and making estate bottled wines from the bodegas.

== Culture ==
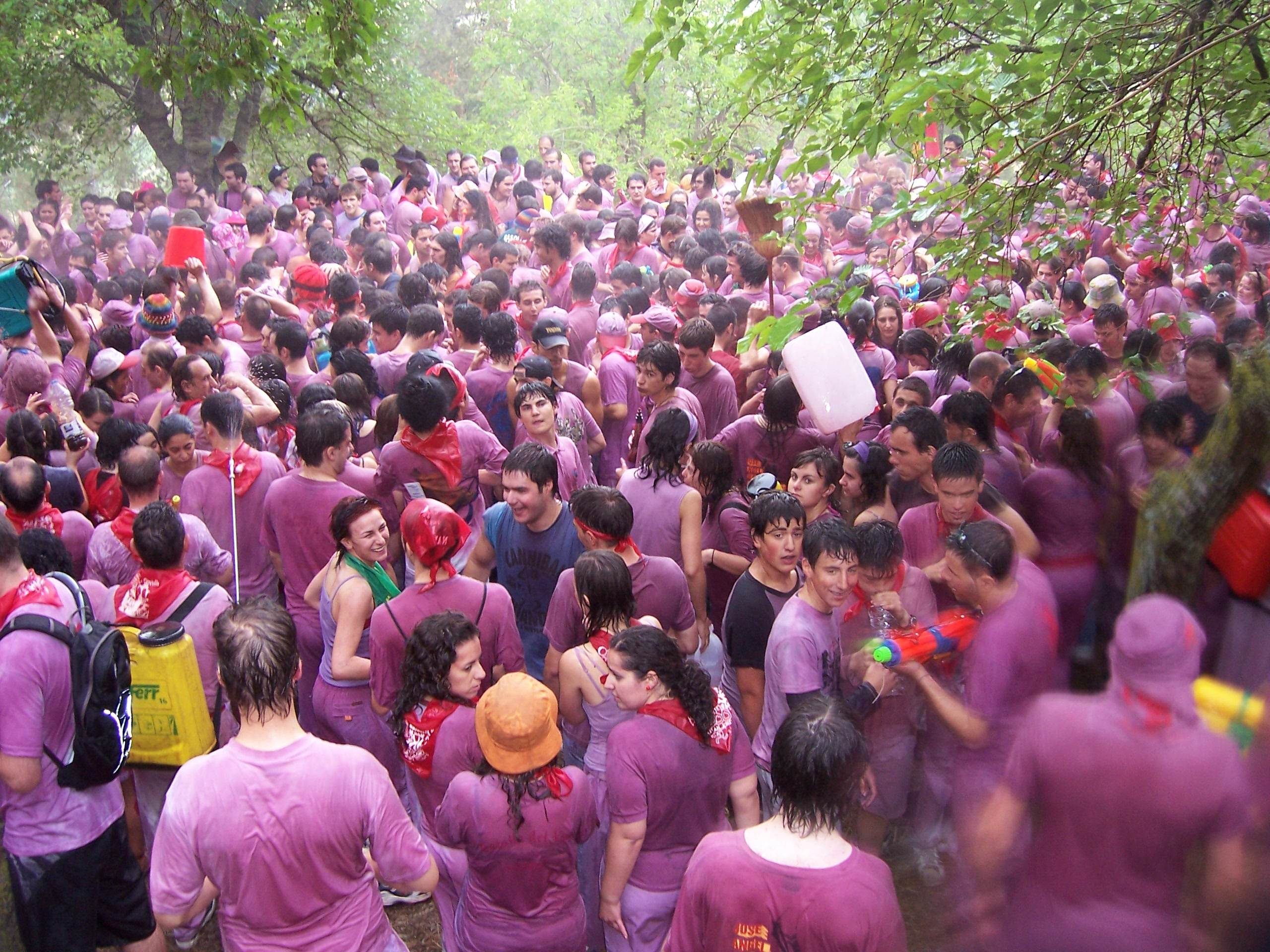
The wine drenched participants of the Batalla de Vino in Haro

Like most Spanish wine regions, Rioja is an integral part of Spanish culture and cuisine. In the town of Haro there is an annual Wine Festival that is noted for its Batalla de Vino where participants conduct a food fight of sorts with wine.
