= Isla de Menorca (Vino de la Tierra) =

Isla de Menorca VdlT
- Wine region
- Isla de Menorca VdlT in the region of the Balearic Islands
- Type: Vino de la Tierra
- Country: Spain

VdlT wine regions of the Balearic Islands

Isla de Menorca is a Spanish geographical indication for Vino de la Tierra wines located in the autonomous region of the Balearic Islands, Spain. Vino de la Tierra is one step below the mainstream Denominación de Origen indication on the Spanish wine quality ladder.

The area covered by this geographical indication comprises all the municipalities of the island of Menorca. There are currently around 20 hectares of vineyards and 5 wineries (bodegas) registered with the Regulatory Council (Consejo Regulador).

It acquired its Vino de la Tierra status in 2002.

== Grape varieties ==
- Red: Cabernet sauvignon, Merlot, Monastrell, Tempranillo and Syrah
- White: Chardonnay, Macabeo, Malvasia, Moscatel, Parellada and Moll
