= Torre Muga =

Spanish wine

Torre Muga is a wine originating in Rioja, Spain. The wine is built from 75% Tempranillo, 15% Mazuelo, 10% Graciano.
