= Ribeiras do Morrazo =

Coordinates: 42°25′57.8″N 8°38′28.6″W

IXP Ribeiras do Morrazo
- Wine region
- Official name: Indicación Xeográfica Protexida Ribeiras do Morrazo
- Type: Indicación Geográfica Protegida / Vino de la Tierra
- Year established: 2018
- Country: Spain
- No. of wineries: 7

Ribeiras do Morrazo is a Spanish geographical indication for Vino de la Tierra wines located in the autonomous region of Galicia. Vino de la Tierra is one step below the mainstream Denominación de Origen indication on the Spanish wine quality ladder, and mirrors the Vins de pays of French wine.

The area covered by this geographical indication comprises the municipalities of Pontevedra, Poio, Vilaboa, Bueu, Cangas, Moaña, Marín, and Redondela, in the province of Pontevedra, in Galicia, Spain.

It acquired its Vino de la Tierra status in 2018.

== Authorised Grape Varieties ==
The authorised grape varieties are:

- Red: Tempranillo, Cabernet Sauvignon, Merlot, Syrah, Tintilla de Rota, Brancellao, Caíño Tinto, Pedral, Espadeiro, Loureiro Tinto, Mencía, and Sousón
- White: Albariño, Caíño Blanco, Godello, Loureira, Treixadura, Branco Lexítimo, and Torrontés
