= Bailen =

Bailen may refer to:

== People ==
- Nick Bailen (born 1989), American-Belarusian ice hockey defensemen

== Places ==
- Bailén, a town in Jaén, Spain
  - Battle of Bailén, 1808
- Bailén (Vino de la Tierra), a Spanish geographical indication for Vino de la Tierra wines located in the autonomous region of Andalusia
- General Emilio Aguinaldo, Cavite, a municipality in the Philippines, which was formerly and still commonly known as Bailen
- Bailén (Metrovalencia), a metro station in Valencia

== Other ==
- Bailen (band), American rock band
- Battle of Bailén of 1808

== See also ==
- Bailén-Miraflores, one of the 11 districts of the city of Málaga, Spain
