= Formentera (Vino de la Tierra) =

Formentera VdlT
- Wine region
- Formentera VdlT in the region of the Balearic Islands
- Type: Vino de la Tierra
- Country: Spain

VdlT wine regions of the Balearic Islands

Formentera is a Spanish geographical indication for Vino de la Tierra wines located in Formentera in the autonomous region of the Balearic Islands, Spain. Vino de la Tierra is one step below the mainstream Denominación de Origen indication on the Spanish wine quality ladder.

The area covered by this geographical indication comprises all the municipalities of the island of Formentera. There are currently around 10 hectares of vineyards and 2 wineries (bodegas) registered with the Regulatory Council (Consejo Regulador).

It acquired its Vino de la Tierra status in 2004.

== Grape varieties ==
- Red: Monastrell, Fogoneu, Tempranillo, Cabernet sauvignon and Merlot
- White: Malvasia, Premsal blanco, Chardonnay and Viognier
