= Altiplano de Sierra Nevada =

Altiplano de Sierra Nevada VdlT
- Wine region
- Altiplano de Sierra Nevada VdlT the province of Granada in the region of Andalusia
- Type: Vino de la Tierra
- Country: Spain

Altiplano de Sierra Nevada in Andalusia.

Altiplano de Sierra Nevada (previously called Norte de Granada) is a Spanish geographical indication for Vino de la Tierra wines located in the autonomous region of Andalusia. Vino de la Tierra is one step below the mainstream Denominación de Origen indication on the Spanish wine quality ladder.

The area covered by this geographical indication comprises certain municipalities in the north of the province of Granada (Andalusia, Spain).

It acquired its Vino de la Tierra status in 2005.

== Grape varieties ==
- Red: Garnacha Tinta, Monastrell, Cabernet Franc, Pinot Noir, Syrah, Cabernet Sauvignon, Tempranillo and Merlot
- White: Baladí Verdejo, Airén, Torrontés, Palomino, Pedro Ximénez, Chardonnay and Macabeo
