= Sierras de las Estancias y los Filabres =

Sierras de las Estancias y los Filabres VdlT
- Wine region
- Sierras de las Estancias y los Filabres VdlT in the province of Almería in the region of Andalusia
- Type: Vino de la Tierra
- Country: Spain

Sierras de las Estancias y los Filabres is a Spanish geographical indication for Vino de la Tierra wines located in the autonomous region of Andalusia. Vino de la Tierra is one step below the mainstream Denominación de Origen indication on the Spanish wine quality ladder.

The area covered by this geographical indication is named after the Sierra de las Estancias and Sierra de los Filabres mountain ranges. It comprises about 25 municipalities in the province of Almería.

It acquired its Vino de la Tierra status in 2008.

== Grape varieties ==
- White: Airén, Chardonnay, Macabeo, Sauvignon blanc and Moscatel de grano menudo (or Morisco)
- Red: Cabernet Sauvignon, Merlot, Monastrell, Tempranillo, Syrah, Garnacha tinta, Pinot noir and Petit Verdot
