= Ibiza (Vino de la Tierra) =

Ibiza VdlT
- Wine region
- Ibiza VdlT in the region of the Balearic Islands
- Type: Vino de la Tierra
- Country: Spain

VdlT wine regions of the Balearic Islands

Ibiza is a Spanish geographical indication for Vino de la Tierra wines located in the autonomous region of the Balearic Islands, Spain. Vino de la Tierra is one step below the mainstream Denominación de Origen indication on the Spanish wine quality ladder.

The area covered by this geographical indication comprises all the municipalities of the island of Ibiza. There are currently about 35 hectares of vineyards, spread over a large part of the island and 5 wineries (known as bodegas in Spanish) registered with the Regulatory Council.

It acquired its Vino de la Tierra status in 1996.

== Grape varieties ==
- Red: Monastrell, Tempranillo, Cabernet sauvignon, Merlot and Syrah
- White: Macabeo, Parellada, Malvasía, Chardonnay and Moscatel
