= Córdoba (Vino de la Tierra) =

Córdoba VdlT
- Wine region
- Córdoba VdlT in the province of Córdoba in the region of Andalusia
- Type: Vino de la Tierra
- Country: Spain

The Córdoba Vino de la Tierra region, in Andalusia.

Córdoba is a Spanish geographical indication for Vino de la Tierra wines, located in the autonomous region of Andalusia. Vino de la Tierra is one step below the mainstream Denominación de Origen indication on the Spanish wine quality ladder.

The area covered by this geographical indication comprises all the municipalities in the province of Córdoba (Andalusia, Spain).

It acquired its Vino de la Tierra status in 2004.

== Grape varieties ==
- Red: Pinot noir, Syrah, Cabernet Sauvignon, Tempranillo, Merlot and Tintilla de Rota
