= Villaviciosa de Córdoba (Vino de la Tierra) =

Villaviciosa de Córdoba VdlT
- Wine region
- Villaviciosa de Córdoba VdlT in the province of Córdoba in the region of Andalusia
- Type: Vino de la Tierra
- Country: Spain

Villaviciosa de Córdoba is a Spanish geographical indication for Vino de la Tierra wines located in the municipalities of Villaviciosa de Córdoba and Espiel, in the province of Córdoba, Andalusia, Spain, which acquired its legal status in 2008.

== Grape varieties ==
The following grape varieties are authorized by the denomination of origin (denominación de origen, DO)'s regulations:

- Baladí Verdejo
- Moscatel de Alejandría
- Palomino Fino
- Palomino
- Pedro Ximénez
- Airén
- Calagraño
- Jaén
- Torrontés
- Verdejo

The maximum authorized yield is 10,000 kg/hectare.

== Wines ==
The following types of wines are covered by this DO:

- White: Minimum alcohol content 13° for oak-aged wines, and 10° for young wines
- Sweet: Minimum alcohol content 13°

== See also ==
- Vino de la Tierra
