= Laujar-Alpujarra =

Laujar - Alpujarra VdlT
- Wine region
- Laujar - Alpujarra VdlT in the province of Almería in the region of Andalusia
- Type: Vino de la Tierra
- Country: Spain

Laujar-Alpujarra wine region, in Andalusia.

Laujar-Alpujarra is a Spanish geographical indication for Vino de la Tierra wines located in the autonomous region of Andalusia. Vino de la Tierra is one step below the mainstream Denominación de Origen indication on the Spanish wine quality ladder.

The area covered by this geographical indication comprises the municipalities of Alcolea, Fondón, Alboloduy and Laujar de Andarax, in the province of Almería (Andalusia, Spain). The Valle de Laujar (Laujer Valley), located in the upper reaches of the River Andarax has over 800 hectares of vineyards grown on terraces on the steep slopes of the mountains at an elevation of over 900 m above sea level.

It acquired its Vino de la Tierra status in 2004.

== Grape varieties ==
- Red: Garnacha tinta, Monastrell, Syrah, Cabernet Sauvignon, Tempranillo and Merlot
- White: Jaén blanco, Macabeo, Vijiriego, Pedro Ximénez, Chardonnay and Moscatel de grano menudo
