= Castilla y León (Vino de la Tierra) =

Castilla y León VdlT
- Wine region
- Castilla y León VdlT in the region of Castile and León
- Type: Vino de la Tierra
- Country: Spain

Castilla y León is a Spanish geographical indication for Vino de la Tierra wines located in the autonomous region of Castile and León. Vino de la Tierra is one step below the mainstream Denominación de Origen indication on the Spanish wine quality ladder.

The area covered by this geographical indication comprises all the municipalities in Castile and León.

It acquired its Vino de la Tierra status in 2005.
