= Laderas del Genil =

Laderas del Genil VdlT
- Wine region
- Laderas del Genil VdlT in the province of Granada in the region of Andalusia
- Type: Vino de la Tierra
- Country: Spain

The Laderas del Genil VdlT region, in Andalusia.

Laderas del Genil (previously called Granada Sur-Oeste) is a Spanish geographical indication for Vino de la Tierra wines located in the autonomous region of Andalusia. Vino de la Tierra is one step below the mainstream Denominación de Origen indication on the Spanish wine quality ladder.

The area covered by this geographical indication comprises the wine-producing area in the southwest of the province of Granada (Andalusia, Spain).

It acquired its Vino de la Tierra status in 2003.

== Grape varieties ==
- Red: Garnacha tinta, Pinot noir, Syrah, Cabernet Sauvignon, Tempranillo, Merlot and Perruna
- White: Vijiriego, Pedro Ximénez, Chardonnay, Moscatel de Alejandría, Palomino, Macabeo and Sauvignon blanc
