= Norte de Almería =

Norte de Almería VdlT
- Wine region
- Norte de Almería VdlT in the province of Almería in the region of Andalusia
- Type: Vino de la Tierra
- Country: Spain

Norte de Almería is a Spanish geographical indication for Vino de la Tierra wines located in the autonomous region of Andalusia. Vino de la Tierra is one step below the mainstream Denominación de Origen indication on the Spanish wine quality ladder.

The area covered by this geographical indication comprises the following municipalities: Chirivel, María, Vélez-Blanco and Vélez-Rubio, in the north of the province of Almería (Andalusia, Spain).

It acquired its Vino de la Tierra status in 2008.

== Grape varieties ==
- White: Airén, Chardonnay, Macabeo and Sauvignon blanc
- Red: Cabernet Sauvignon, Merlot, Monastrell, Tempranillo and Syrah

The regulations specifically forbid the use of any genetically modified varieties for the production of wines.
