= Betanzos (Vino de la Tierra) =

Betanzos VdlT
- Wine region
- Betanzos VdlT in the province of A Coruña in the region of Galicia
- Type: Vino de la Tierra
- Country: Spain

Betanzos is a Spanish geographical indication for Vino de la Tierra wines located in the autonomous region of Galicia. Vino de la Tierra is one step below the mainstream Denominación de Origen indication on the Spanish wine quality ladder.

The area covered by this geographical indication comprises the municipalities of Coirós, Bergondo, Betanzos and Paderne, in the province of A Coruña, in Galicia, Spain.

There are four principal warehouses: Adegas Lorenzo Bescansa, Bodegas Rilo, Adegas Codeseira, Casa Beade and Viña Ártabra

It acquired its Vino de la Tierra status in 2001.

== Grape varieties ==
- Red: Mencía, Caiño and Gran negro
- White: Palomino, Godello and Blanco Lexítimo
