= Los Palacios (Vino de la Tierra) =

Wine region in Andalusia, Spain

Los Palacios VdlT
- Wine region
- Los Palacios VdlT in the province of Seville in the region of Andalusia
- Type: Vino de la Tierra
- Country: Spain

The Los Palacios VdlT region, in Andalusia.

Los Palacios is a Spanish geographical indication for Vino de la Tierra wines located in the autonomous region of Andalusia. Vino de la Tierra is one step below the mainstream Denominación de Origen indication on the Spanish wine quality ladder.

The area covered by this geographical indication comprises the municipalities of Los Palacios y Villafranca, Utrera, Dos Hermanas and Alcalá de Guadaira, in the province of Seville, (Andalusia, Spain).

It acquired its Vino de la Tierra status in 2003.

== Grape varieties ==
- White: Airén, Colombard and Sauvignon blanc
