= Torreperogil (Vino de la Tierra) =

Torreperogil VdlT
- Wine region
- Torreperogil VdlT in the province of Jaén in the region of Andalusia
- Type: Vino de la Tierra
- Country: Spain

The Torreperogil VdlT region, in Andalusia.

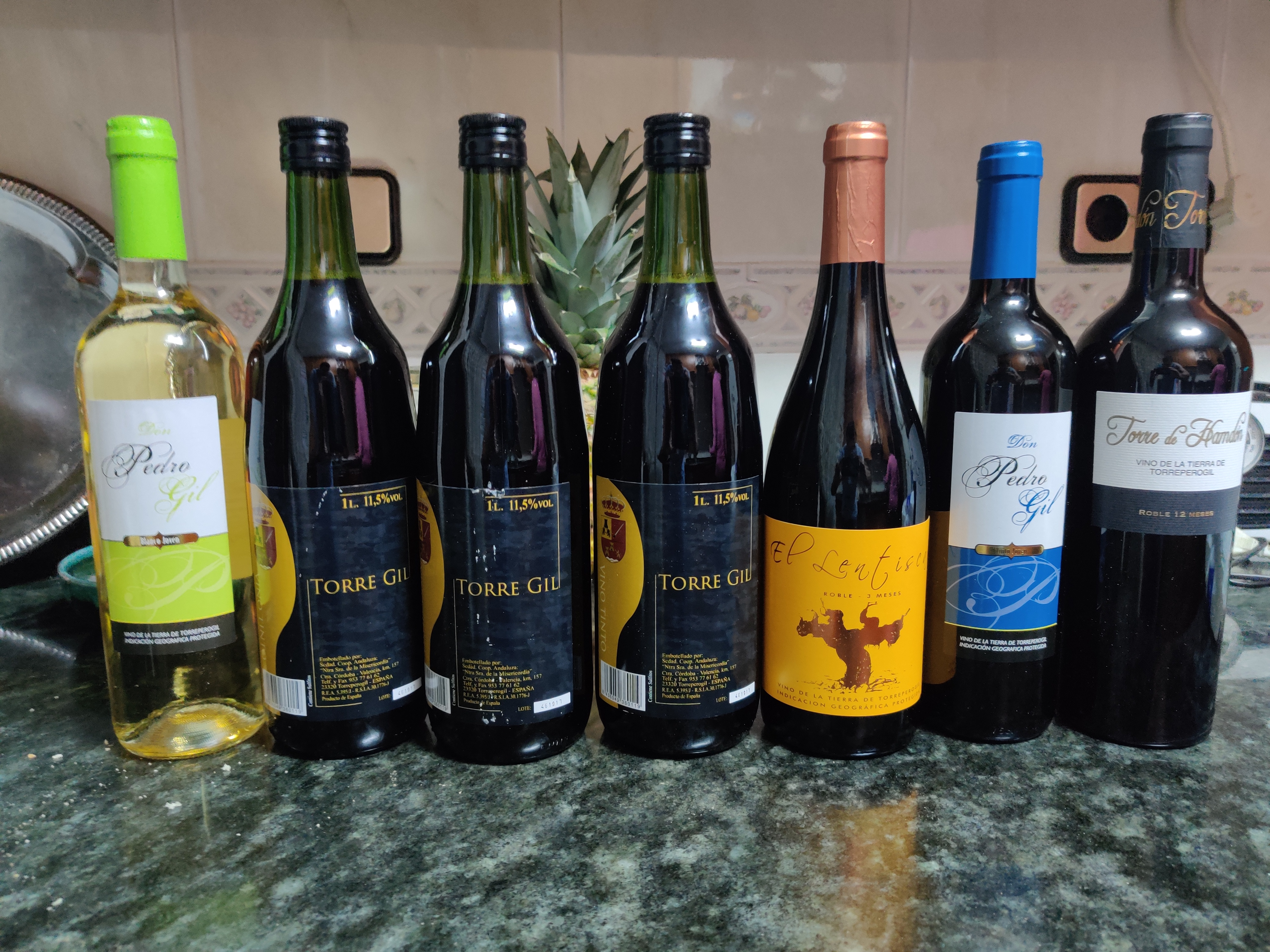
Bottles of wine from the geographical indication Torreperogil VdlT.

Torreperogil is a Spanish geographical indication for Vino de la Tierra wines located in the autonomous region of Andalusia. Vino de la Tierra is one step below the mainstream Denominación de Origen indication on the Spanish wine quality ladder.

The area covered by this geographical indication comprises the municipalities of Úbeda, Sabiote, Rus, Cabra del Santo Cristo, Canena and Torreperogil, in the province of Jaén, (Andalusia, Spain).

It acquired its Vino de la Tierra status in 2006.

== Grape varieties ==
- Red: Garnacha tinta, Syrah, Cabernet Sauvignon and Tempranillo
- White: Jaén blanco and Pedro Ximénez
