= Pardillo =

Variety of grape

Pardillo is a white Spanish wine grape planted primarily in western Spain. Varietal wines made from Pardillo are neutral flavored.
