= Bailén (Vino de la Tierra) =

Bailén VdlT
- Wine region
- Bailén VdlT in the province of Jaén in the region of Andalusia
- Type: Vino de la Tierra
- Country: Spain

Bailén is a Spanish geographical indication for Vino de la Tierra wines located in the autonomous region of Andalusia. Vino de la Tierra is one step below the mainstream Denominación de Origen indication on the Spanish wine quality ladder.

The area covered by this geographical indication comprises the following municipalities: Bailén, Baños de la Encina, Guarromán, Mengíbar, Torredelcampo and Villanueva de la Reina, in the province of Jaén (Andalusia, Spain).

It acquired its Vino de la Tierra status in 2004.

== Grape varieties ==
- White: Molinera and Pedro Ximénez
- Rosé: Molinera and Tempranillo
- Red: Molinera, Tempranillo, Cabernet Sauvignon and Garnacha tinta
