= Vino de calidad =

Spanish wine classification

Vino de Calidad con indicación geográfica (VC) ('quality wine with geographic indication'), is classification for Spanish wine. The category was formed in 2003 along with Vino de Pago. The VC category is used for wines that do not fully meet the stringent standards of the DO category, but are above the standards of the Indicación Geográfica Protegida (IGP) category. As of 2019, there were 7 VCs.

The category of VC is within the denominación de origen protegida DOP ('protected denomination of origin') category, the mainstay of Spain's wine quality control system. As of 2019 there were 96 DOPs that are subdivided into DOCa (Denominación de origen Calificada), DO (Denominación de origen), Vino de Pago (VP), and VC. The sub-categories can be called DOP, or they can use the traditional terms of DOCa, DO, VP, and VC.
