= Moristel =

Variety of grape

- Grape (Vitis)
- Species: Vitis vinifera
- VIVC number: 12353

Moristel is a minor Spanish red grape variety. It is mainly found in the autonomous region of Aragon and is one of the authorized varieties of the Somontano Denominación de Origen (DO). It has medium-sized, compact bunches with medium-sized, cylindrical-shaped berries with a blue hue. Traditionally it has been used for blending with other varieties to add body and colour to the wine.

== Synonyms ==
Moristel is also known as Concejón, Juán Ibáñez, Miguel de Arcos and Miguel del Arco (or Miguel d'Arco).
