= Vino de la tierra =

Classification of Spanish wine

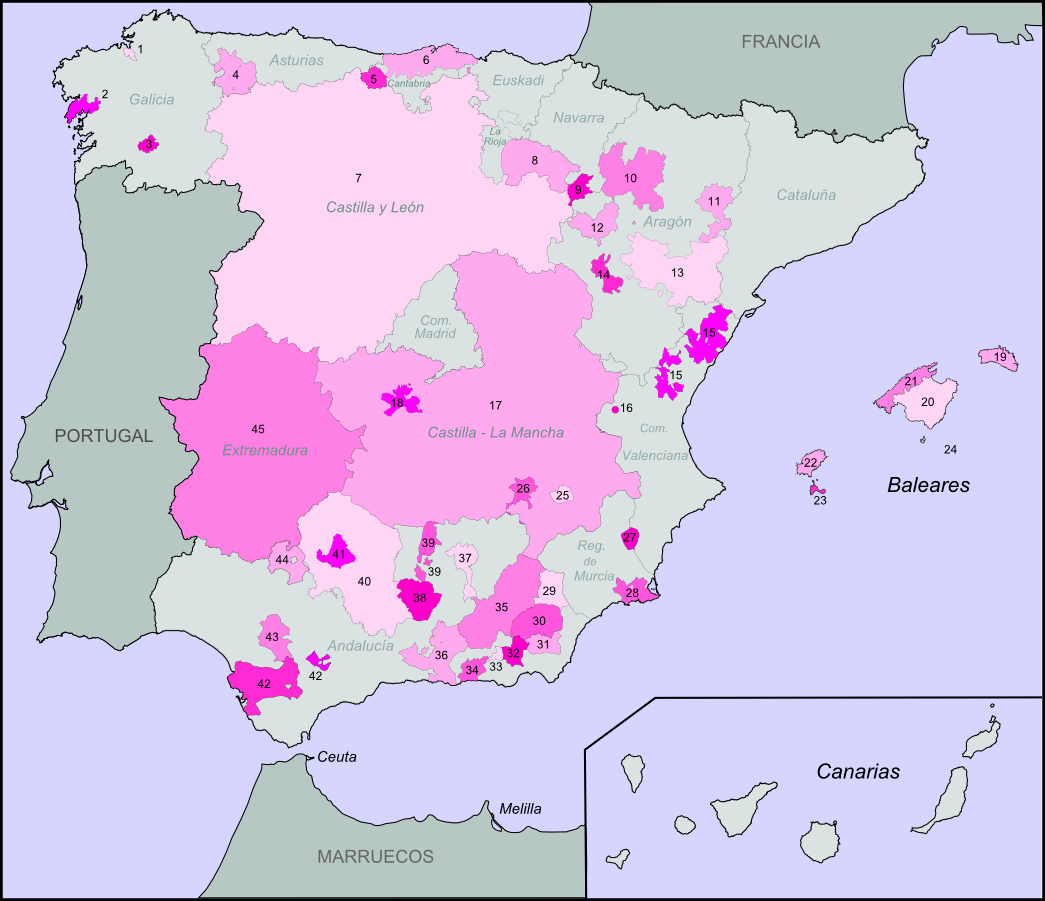
Location of vinos de la tierra

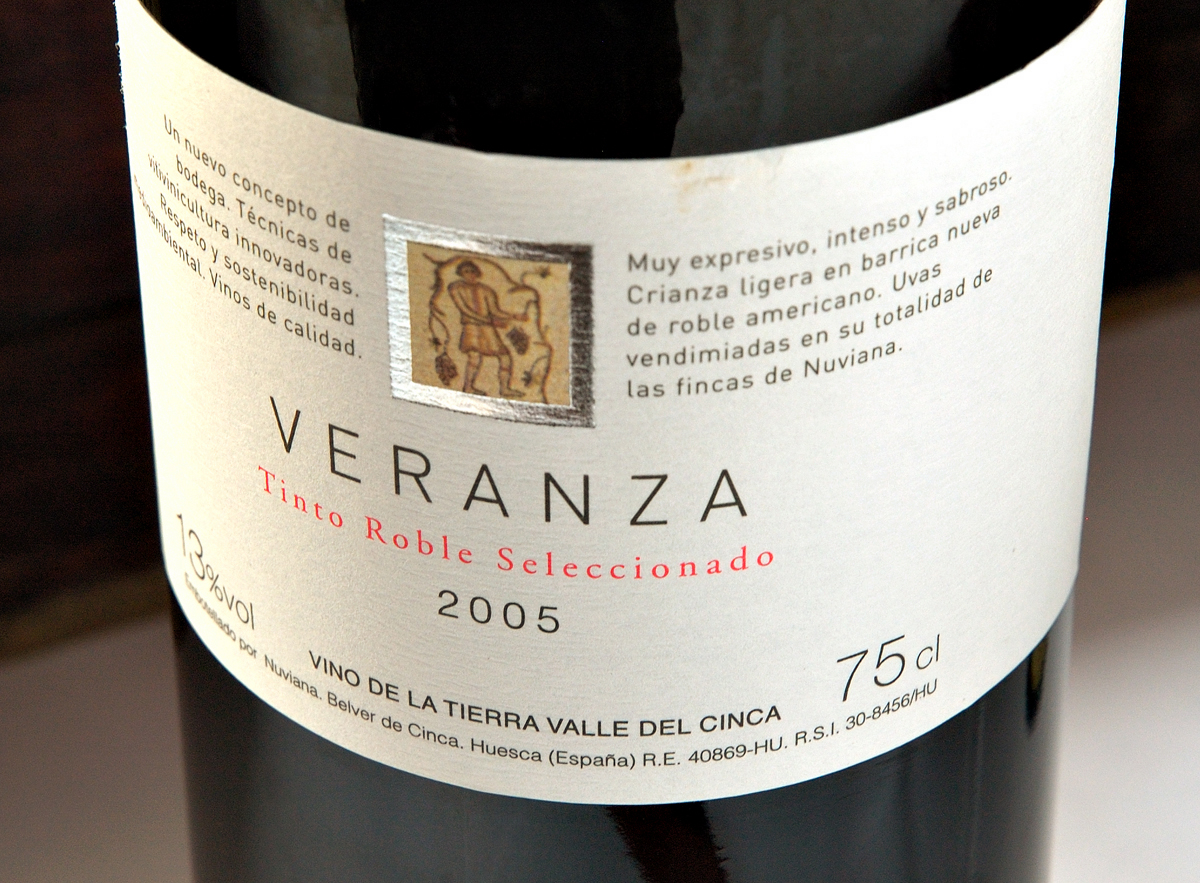
Label on vino de la tierra wine

Vino de la tierra is a quality of Spanish wine that designates the rung below the mainstream quality wine classification of denominación de origen protegida (DOP). It is the equivalent of the French vin de pays. It represents a higher quality than table wine, and covers still wine, sparkling wine, and fortified wine. Since 2016 the classification is called indicación geográfica protegida (IGP), but wines can still use the traditional name of vino de la tierra. The labels of vino de la tierra wines are allowed to state the year of vintage and the grape varieties used in production.

In 2019 there were 42 registered vino de la tierra wines in Spain.

== Current IGP / VdlT designations ==
Andalusia

- Altiplano de Sierra Nevada
- Bailén
- Cádiz
- Córdoba
- Cumbres del Guadalfeo
- Desierto de Almería
- Laderas del Genil
- Laujar-Alpujarra
- Los Palacios
- Norte de Almería
- Ribera del Andarax
- Sierra Norte de Sevilla
- Sierra Sur de Jaén
- Sierras de las Estancias y los Filabres
- Torreperogil
- Villaviciosa de Córdoba

Aragon

- Bajo Aragón
- Ribera del Gállego-Cinco Villas
- Ribera del Jiloca
- Ribera del Queiles (multi-regional)
- Valdejalón
- Valle del Cinca

Balearic Islands

- Formentera
- Ibiza
- Illes Balears
- Isla de Menorca
- Mallorca
- Serra de Tramuntana-Costa Nord

Cantabria

- Costa de Cantabria
- Liébana

Castile and León

- Castile and León

Castilla–La Mancha

- Castilla

Extremadura

- Extremadura

Galicia

- Barbanza e Iria
- Betanzos
- Ribeiras do Morrazo
- Val do Miño-Ourense

La Rioja

- Valles de Sadacia

Murcia

- Murcia
- Campo de Cartagena

Navarre

- Ribera del Queiles (multi-regional)
- 3 Riberas

Valencia

- Castelló

== Similar wine classifications in Europe ==
Levels corresponding to vino de la tierra in other countries are:

- Indicazione geografica tipica for equivalent quality wines from Italy.
- Landwein for equivalent quality wines from Germany, Austria and South Tyrol.
- Landwijn for equivalent quality wines from Netherlands.
- Regional wine for equivalent quality wines from the United Kingdom.
- Vin de pays for equivalent quality wines from France, Luxembourg and Val d'Aosta.
- Vinho regional for equivalent quality wines from Portugal.
- Viño da terra for equivalent quality wines from Galician-speaking regions in Spain.
- Vi de la terra for equivalent quality wines from Catalan-speaking regions in Spain.
- Ονομασία κατά παράδοση (traditional name) or τοπικός οίνος (regional wine) for equivalent quality wines from Greece.

== See also ==
- List of Andalusian food and drink products with protected status
