= Bobal =

Variety of grape

- Grape (Vitis)
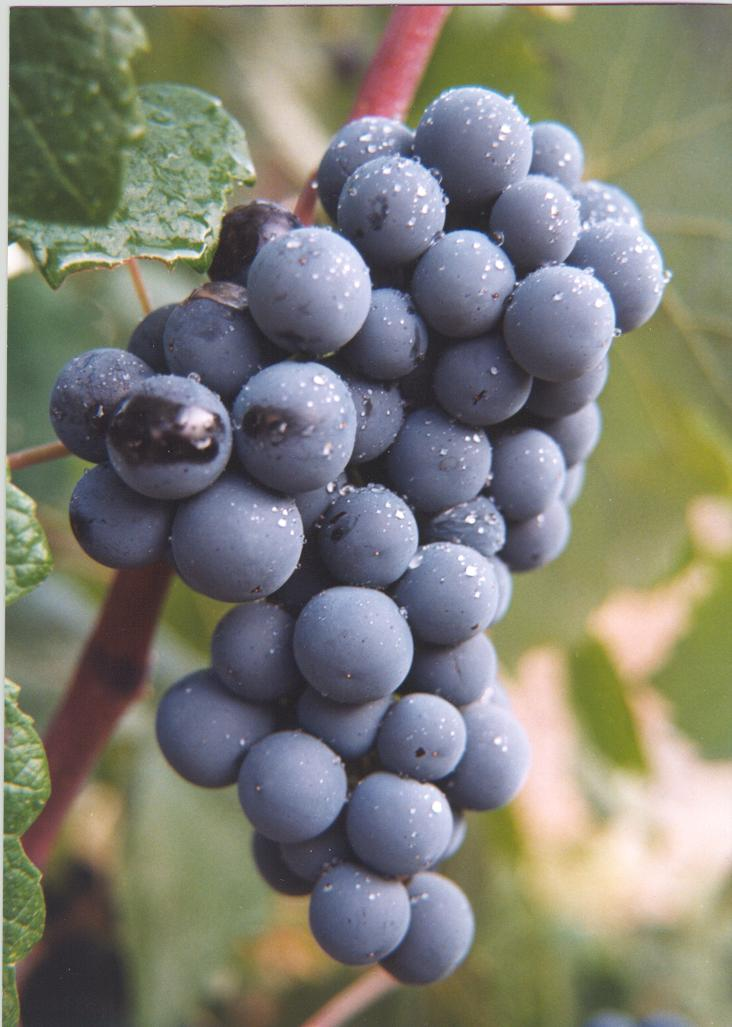
- Bunch of Bobal grapes
- Color of berry skin: Red
- Species: Vitis vinifera
- Also called: Bobos (more)
- Origin: Spain
- VIVC number: 1493

Bobal is a variety of Vitis vinifera, a red grape used in winemaking. It is native to the Utiel-Requena region in Valencia, Spain. The presence of Bobal in Utiel-Requena was documented in the 15th century in "Espill o llibre de les dones" by Jaume Roig. The name derives from the Latin bovale, in reference to the shape of a bull's head.

It is grown predominantly in the Utiel-Requena DOP where it represents about 80% of the red grapes vines grown, and is also present in significant quantities in Valencia, Cuenca and Albacete. It can only be found in small quantities in other regions of Spain: La Manchuela (Castilla–La Mancha), selected vineyards in Ribera del Guadiana, Alicante, Murcia, Campo de Borja, Calatayud, Cariñena, Valdejalón. In 2015 there were 61,524 hectares (152,029 acres) in Spain, making Bobal the second most common red grape variety in Spain. Small quantities are also grown in Rosellón (south of France) and in Sardinia (Italy).

The best wines are deep, soft color. Bobal has traditionally been used for the production of bulk wine, but producers working in higher altitudes than 800 metres (2,625 feet) above sea level, as Bodega De Moya are taking this variety more seriously.

== Description ==
The vine is very vigorous and highly productive, has a natural semi-erect posture, with long, strong, trailing shoots, which makes it a difficult vine to work in the summer. The shoots often completely cover the ground thus helping to conserve moisture during the hot summers. It adapts well to all types of vine formation but is most commonly grown as a low bush (en vaso) and less often on trellises (en espaldera). It is perfectly adapted to the local climate and so is resistant to extremes of weather and diseases.

The pulp is colourless and meaty; the hard skin of the round medium-sized berries is intensely and brightly coloured, the smell is fresh, original and fragrant. The taste is pleasantly acidic and tannic. The average bunch is of medium-large size, compact, with an irregular cone shape.

The must is normally high in colorants and tannins and is suitable both for aging and for coupage with other varieties. The must also contains higher than average quantities of resveratrol.

The wines produced tend to be fruity, low in alcohol content (around 11°) and high in acidity (5.5 to 6.5 tartaric acid).

A rare white variety of the same name also exists, but it is not genetically related.

== Synonyms ==
Also known as bobos, rajeno, requena, espagnol, benicarlo, provechón, valenciana, carignan d'espagne, balau, balauro, tinto de requena, coreana, tonto de zurra, requenera, requení, requeno, valenciana tinta.
