= Mazuela =

Coordinates: 42°12′N 3°55′W

- Municipality
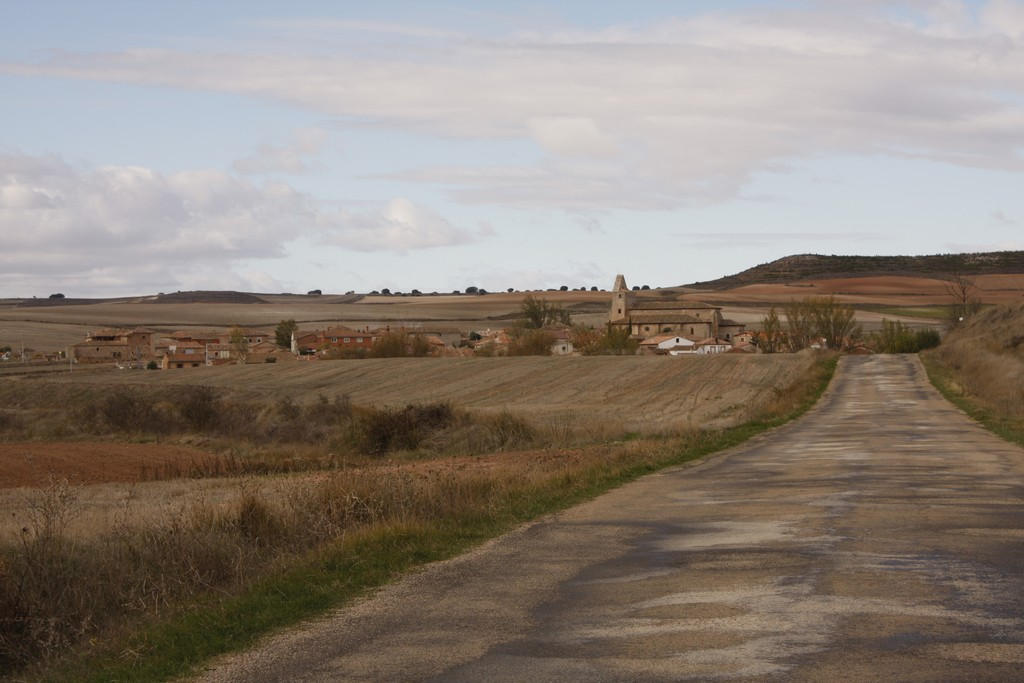
- View of Mazuela, 2009

- Coat of arms
- Interactive map of Mazuela
- Country: Spain
- Autonomous community: Castile and León
- Province: Burgos
- Comarca: Arlanza

Area
  - Total: 13 km^{2} (5.0 sq mi)
- Elevation: 822 m (2,697 ft)

Population (2025-01-01)
  - Total: 55
  - Density: 4.2/km^{2} (11/sq mi)
- Time zone: UTC+1 (CET)
  - Summer (DST): UTC+2 (CEST)
- Postal code: 09228
- Website: http://www.mazuela.es/

Mazuela is a municipality and town located in the province of Burgos, Castile and León, Spain. According to a 2008 estimate (INE), the municipality has a population of 97 inhabitants. It is about 27 kilometers from Burgos, in the area southwest of the Burgos Province.
