= Graciano =

Variety of grape

- Grape (Vitis)
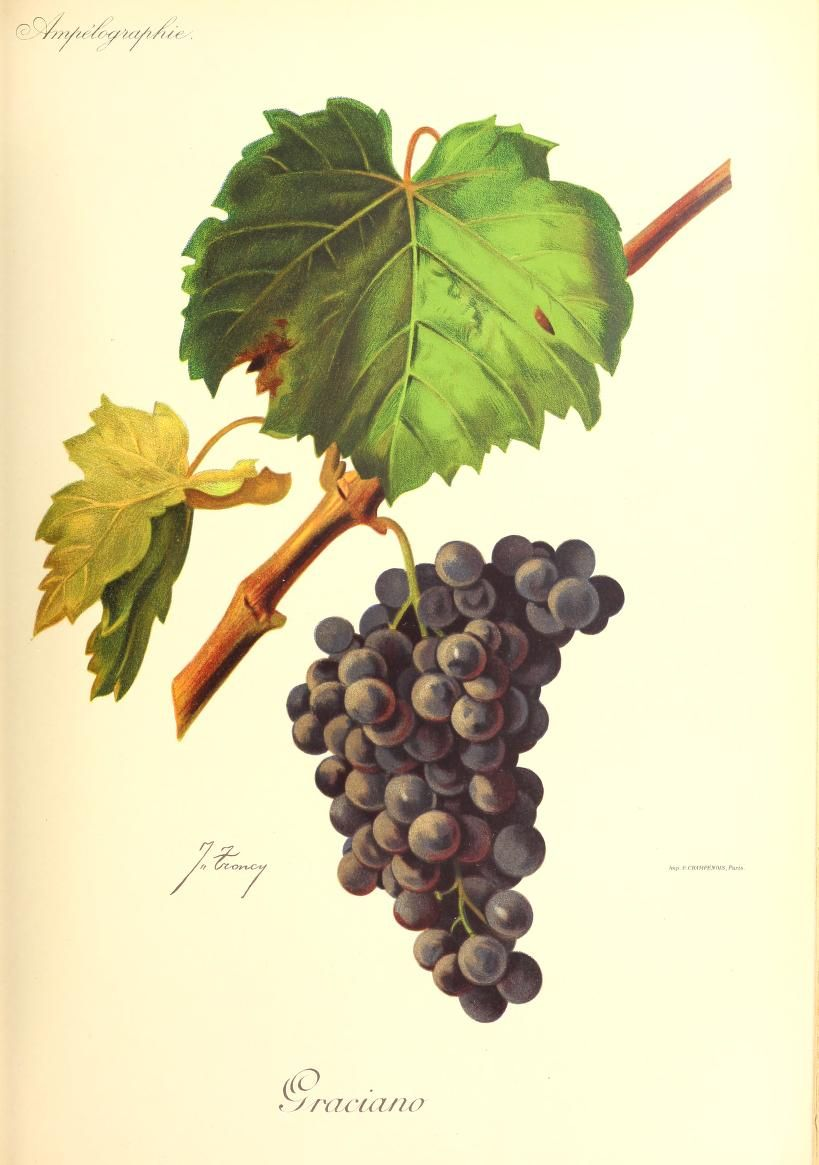
- Graciano in Viala & Vermorel
- Color of berry skin: Red
- Species: Vitis vinifera
- Also called: Morrastel, Cagnulari, Xeres (more)
- Origin: Spain
- Hazards: Disease-prone
- VIVC number: 4935

Graciano is a Spanish red wine grape that is grown primarily in Rioja. The vine produces a low yield that are normally harvested in late October. The wine produced is characterized by its deep red color, strong aroma and ability to age well. Graciano thrives in warm, arid climates.

== Wine regions ==
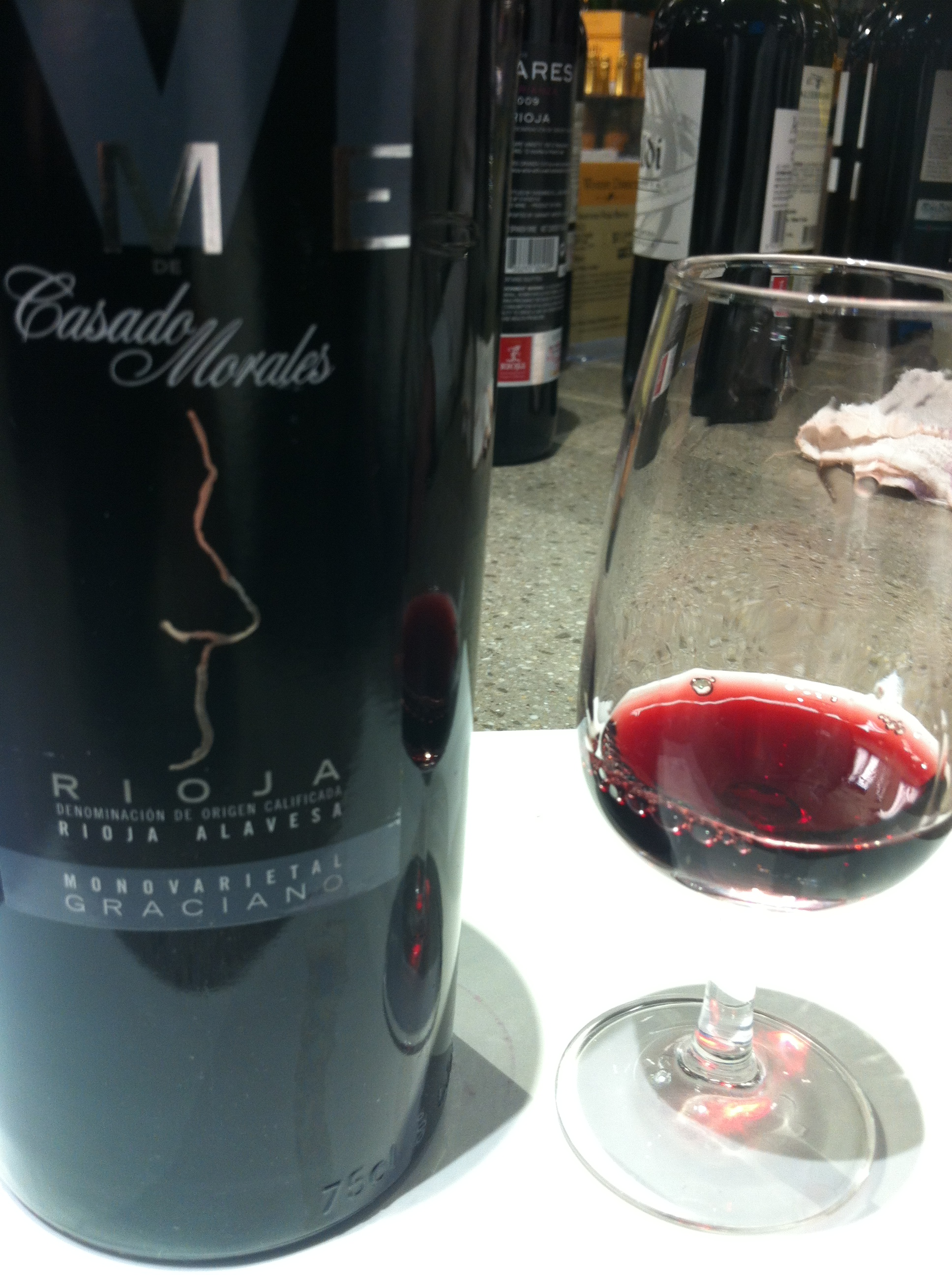
A varietal Graciano from Rioja.

- In Australia, Graciano is used either in blends with Tempranillo or as varietal wines.
- In France, the grape is grown in Languedoc-Roussillon as Morrastel or Courouillade and in Corsica as Minustello or Minustellu.
- In Spain, the grape produces low yields, but it is a key component of Gran Reservas in Rioja and Navarra, contributing structure and aging potential. In the Rioja DO, 395 ha (0.7%) are planted with this variety. While primarily used as a blending partner, some Rioja bodegas produce varietal Graciano wines.
- In California, Graciano is sometimes known as Xeres.
- The grape is also grown in Argentina.
- In the United States, Graciano is also grown in Arizona, Texas, Oregon, and Washington.

== Crossings ==
The French wine grape variety Morrastel Bouschet is a crossing of Graciano and the red-fleshed teinturier grape Bouschet Petit.

== Synonyms ==
Bastardo Nero, Bois Dur, Bordelais, Cagliunari, Cagnonale, Cagnovali Nero, Cagnulari, Cagnulari Bastardo, Cagnulari Sardo, Cagnulatu, Caldareddu, Caldarello, Cargo Muol, Courouillade, Courouillade, Couthurier, Drug, Graciana, Graciano Tinto, Grosse Negrette, Jerusano, Karis, Marastel, Matarou, Minostello, Minustello, Monastel, Monestaou, Morastel, Morestel, Morrastel, Mourastel, Perpignan, Perpignanou Bois Dur, Plant De Ledenon, Tinta Do Padre Antonio, Tinta Miuda, Tintilla, Uva Cagnelata, Xeres, Xerez, Zinzillosa, Cendrón, Tanat Gris, Tintilla de Rota.
