= List of Spanish cheeses =

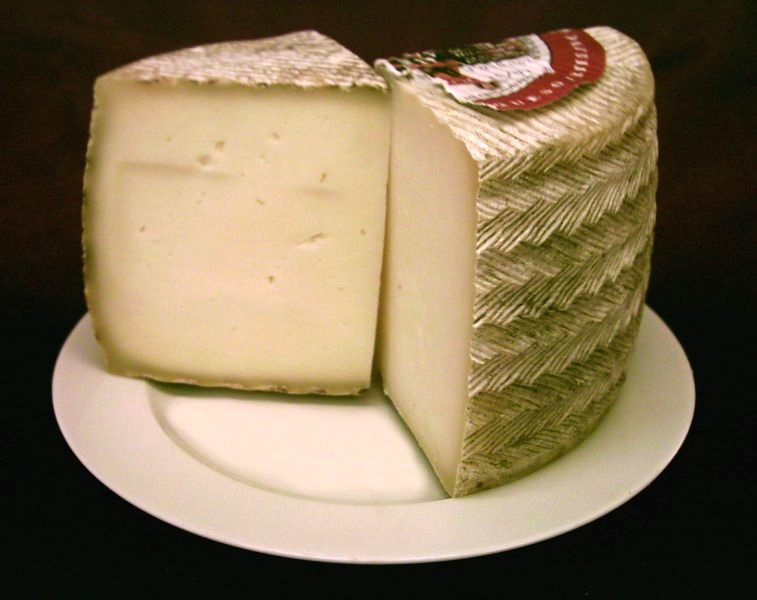
Queso Manchego

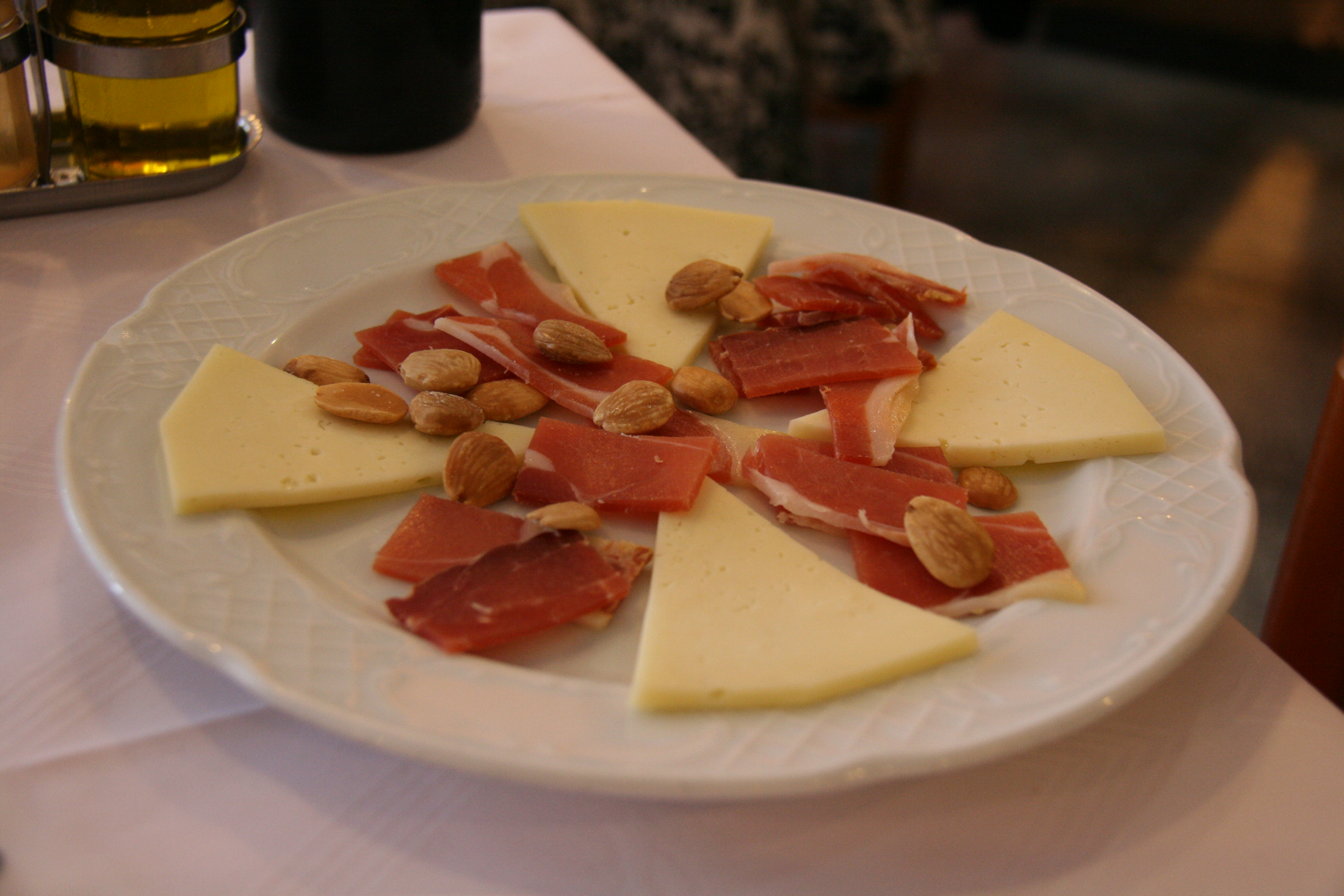
Cheese sometimes accompanies other foods such as ham and other cold cuts.

A wide variety of cheeses are made throughout the country of Spain.

Some of the Spanish cheeses are internationally renowned, such as the Manchego cheese of La Mancha. Some regions are better known for their cheeses than others; 26 cheeses are classified as Protected Designation of Origin (D.O.P.—Denominación de Origen Protegida) and 3 additional cheeses are classified as Protected Geographical Indication (I.G.P. - Indicación Geográfica Protegida) by Spain and the European Union. Many of the cheeses are manufactured from single types of milk (cow, goat or sheep), but a few are mixtures of different milks, and the milk may be raw, pasteurised or creamy. The cheeses are made in a wide variety of styles including fresh, cured, semi-cured and pressed paste, and some are inoculated with mould to make blue varieties. There is a huge variation in the presentation of cheeses, from the hard, dark-skinned, two-kilo Manchego to the soft, small quesitos.

A list of Spanish cheeses follows, grouped by an alphabetical ordering of geographic regions.

== Andalucía ==
- Queso de las Alpujarras (P.D.O.)
- Queso de los Pedroches from raw sheep milk, mostly merino of Sierra de Cazorla, goat milk, cow milk and mixtures of all three
- Queso payoyo of Grazalema, in the Sierra de Cádiz
- Quesitos de Zuheros, Córdoba
- Queso de Fuente Palmera Mainly goat milk with Quinkana brand and mixture milk (cow and goat) with brand "La Abuela Valle", near Cordoba, Sierra Morena and Guadalquivir Valley

== Aragon ==
- Queso de Tronchón, which was cited by Cervantes in Don Quixote, and made with sheep milk or mixed with goat milk
- Queso Echo y Ansó
- Queso de Biescas
- Queso Patamulo
- Queso de Radiquero
- Queso de Benabarre
- Queso Pañoleta
- Queso de Sahún
- Queso de El Burgo
- Queso Chistabín

== Asturias ==
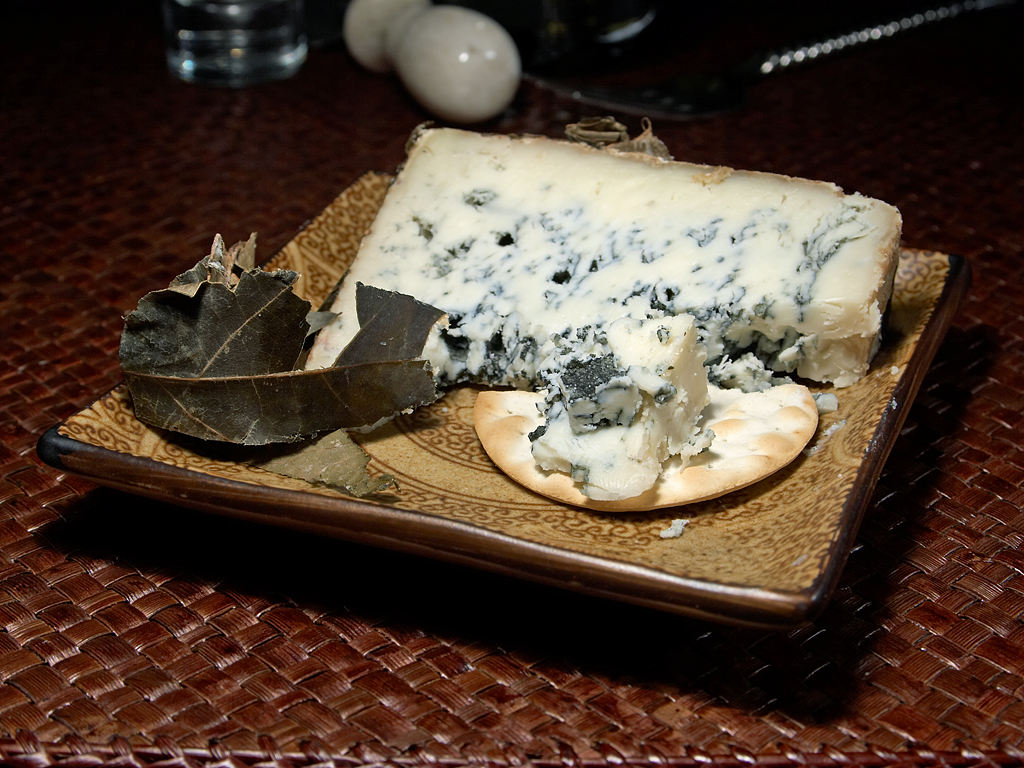
Queso de Cabrales

- Queso Cabrales (P.D.O.)
- Queso de Afuega el pitu (P.D.O)
- Queso de Los Beyos
- Queso Casín (P.D.O.)
- Queso de Gamonedo (D.O.)
- Queso de Peñamellera
- Queso de Urbiés
- Queso de La Peral

== Balearic Islands ==
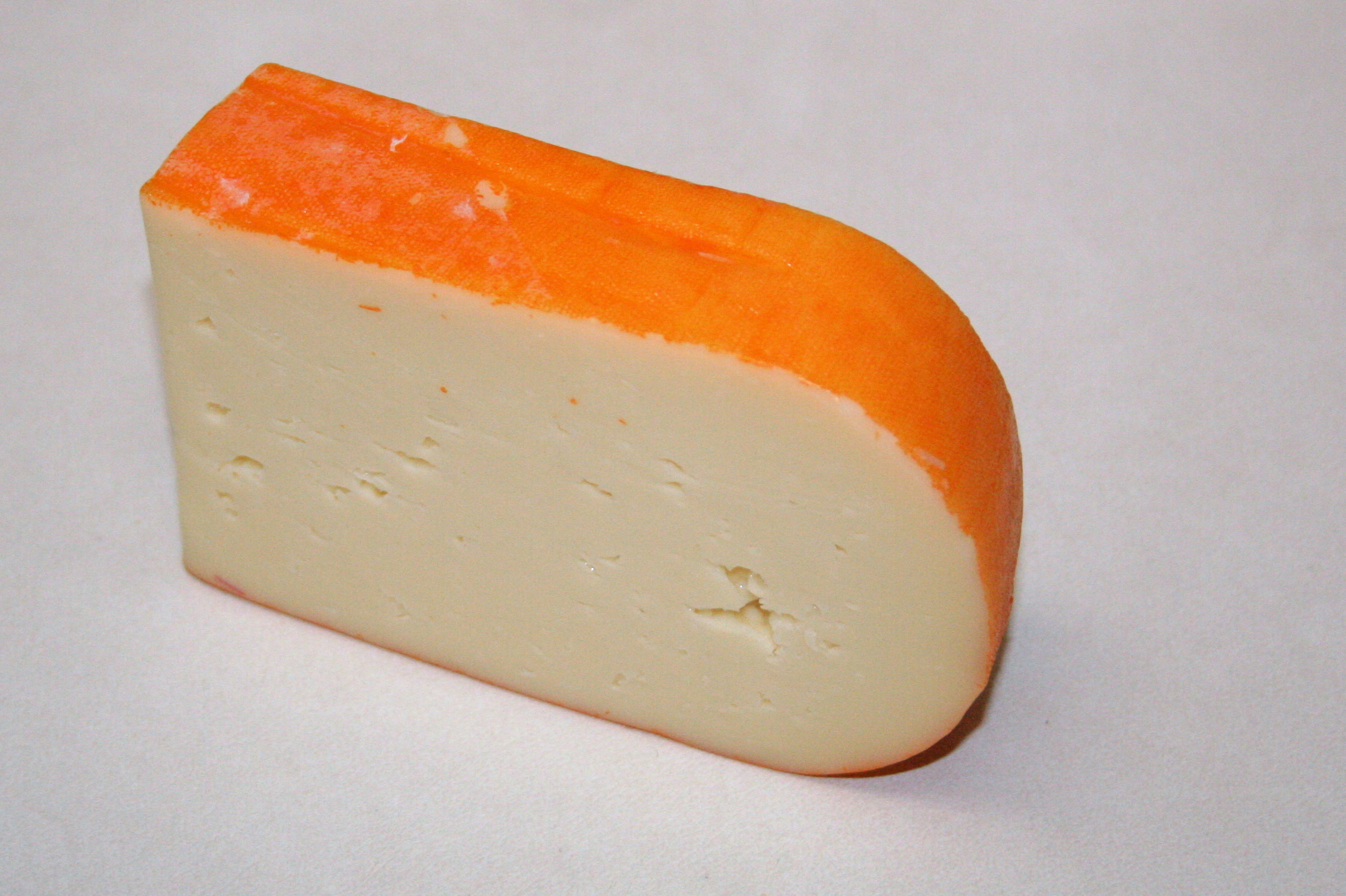
Formatge de Maó

- Formatge de Maó, Menorca.(P.D.O.)
- Formatge Mallorquí (P.D.O.)

== Basque Country ==
- Queso Idiazábal (P.D.O.) shared with Navarre and obtained from Lachen sheep

== Canary Islands ==
- Queso majorero (P.D.O.)
- Queso de flor (P.D.O.)
- Queso palmero (P.D.O.)
- Queso de la Gomera
- Queso de Lanzarote
- Queso herreño

== Cantabria ==
- Picón Bejes-Tresviso (P.D.O.) is very similar to Asturian Cabrales, but also has unique features
- Quesucos de Liébana (P.D.O.)
- Queso Nata de Cantabria (P.D.O.)
- Queso de Áliva, with an aroma similar to smoked beef
- Queso de Brez
- Queso Torta de Potes

== Castile–La Mancha ==
- Queso Manchego (P.D.O.)
- Queso de Oropesa

== Castile and León ==
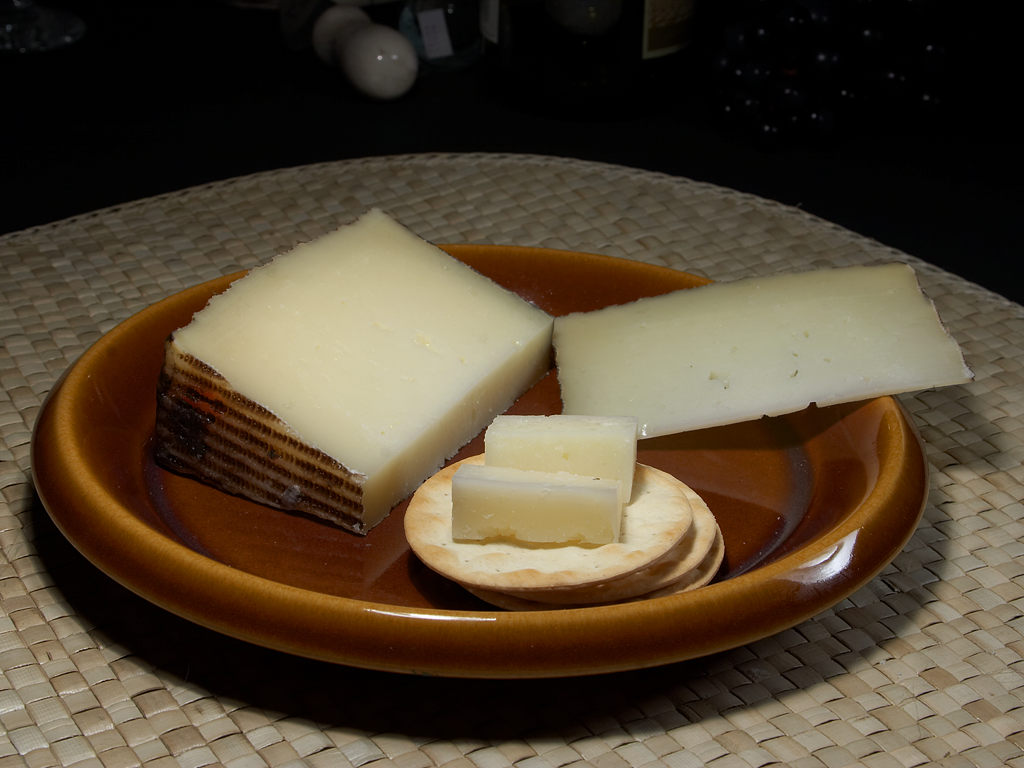
Queso zamorano

- Queso zamorano (P.D.O.)
- Queso de Valdeón (P.D.O.)
- Queso pata de mulo
- Queso castellano
- Queso de Burgos
- Queso del Tiétar
- Queso curado de oveja churra de la comarca de Villadiego
- Queso de Villalón

== Catalonia ==
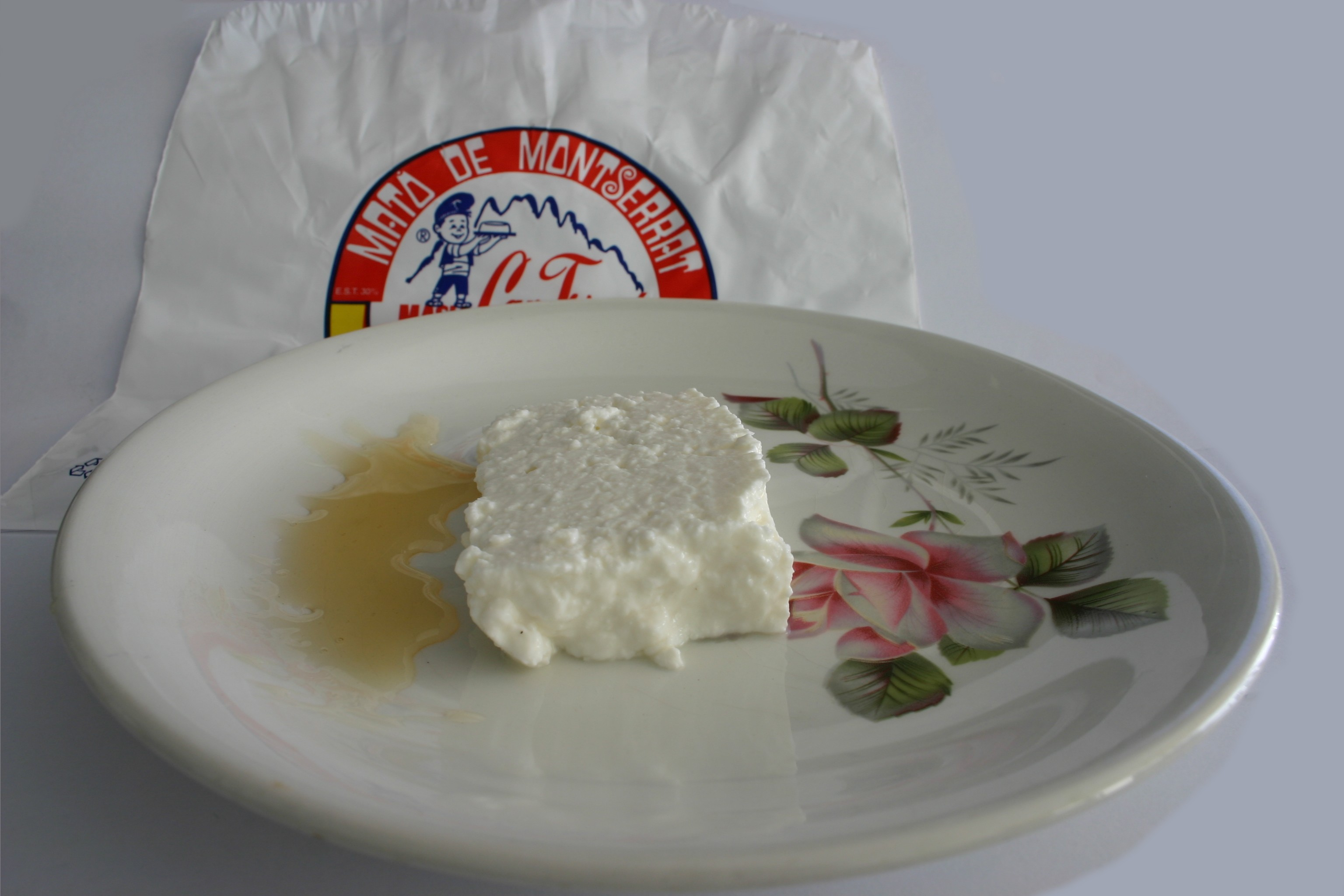
Mató

- Formatge de l'Alt Urgell i la Cerdanya (P.D.O.)
- Formatge de la Garrotxa
- Serrat (Pyrenees)
- Llenguat (Pallars)
- Mató
- Tou dels Til·lers (Pallars Sobirà)
- Tupí (Pyrenees and Pre-Pyrenees)

== Extremadura ==
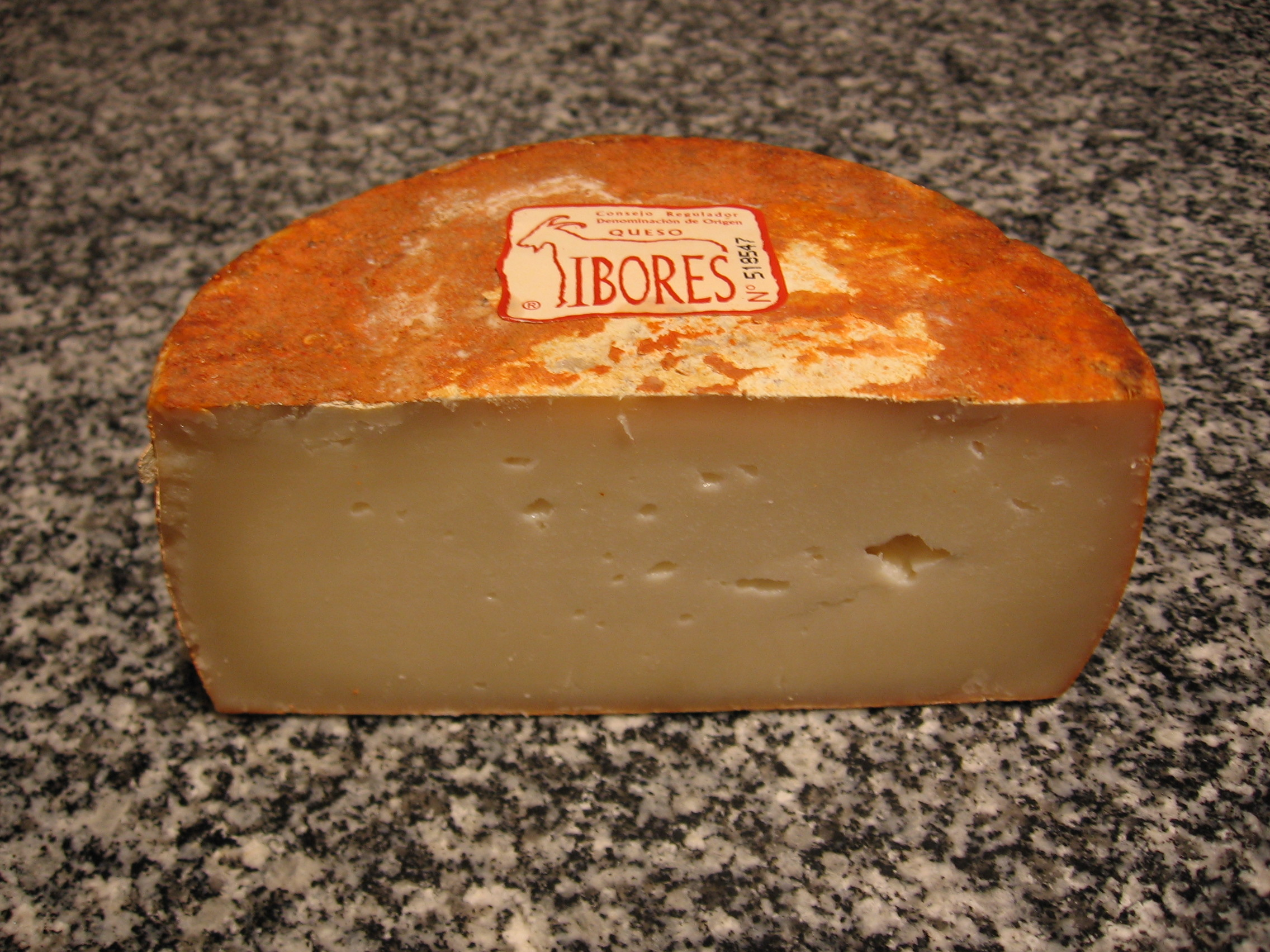
Queso Ibores

- Queso de La Serena, or Torta de La Serena (P.D.O.)
- Queso Ibores (P.D.O.)
- Torta del Casar (P.D.O.)
- Quesaílla
- Queso de Acehúche
- Queso de la Siberia extremeña
- Queso de Gata-Hurdes
- Queso de la Vera

== Galicia ==
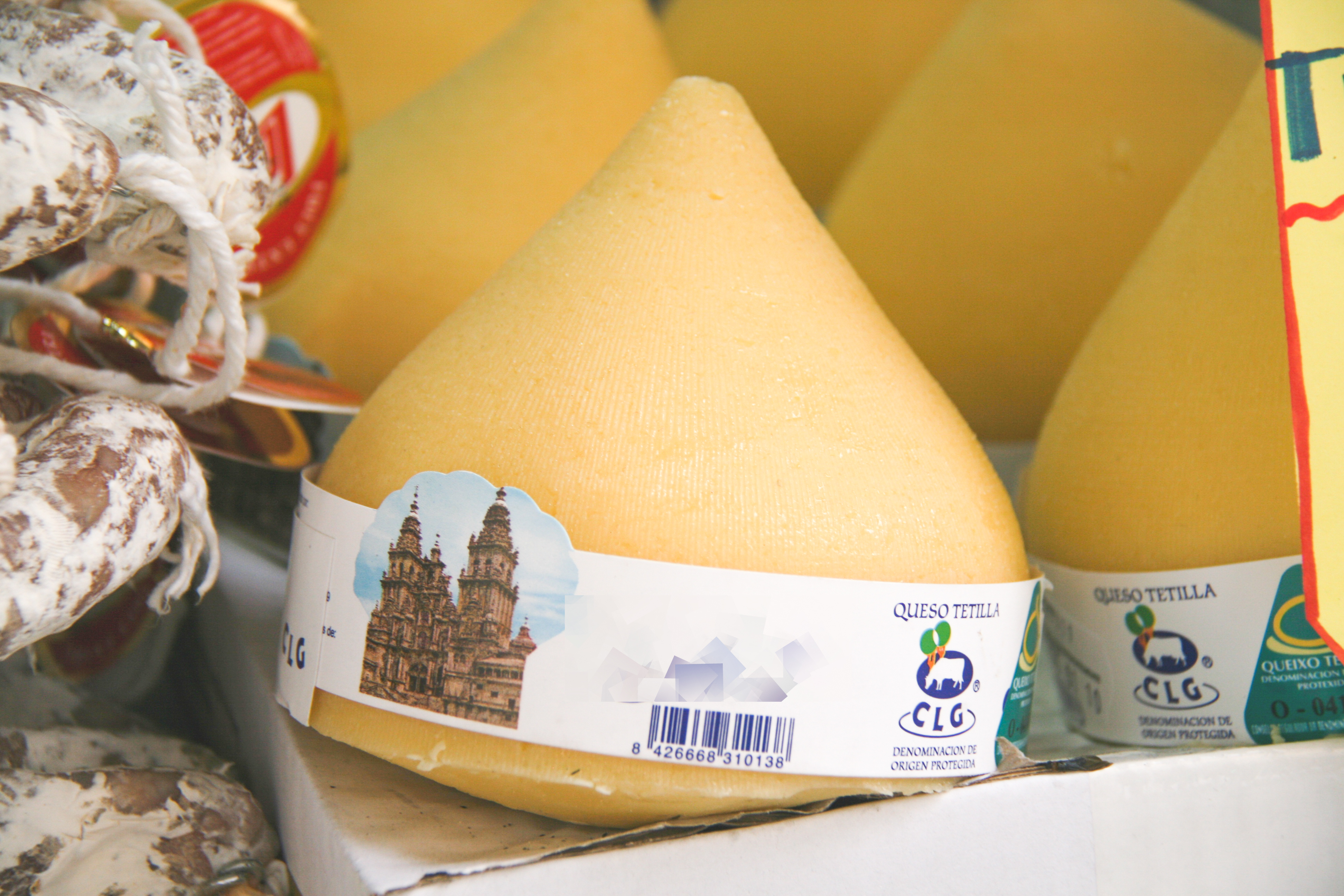
Queso de Tetilla

- Queso de Tetilla (P.D.O.) made from the milk of the Rubia gallega cow
- Queso Arzúa-Ulloa (P.D.O.)
- Queso Cebreiro (P.D.O.)
- Queso San Simón da Costa (P.D.O)

== Murcia ==
- Queso de Murcia al vino (P.D.O.) a cheese made from the pasteurized milk of Murcian goats
- Queso de Murcia (P.D.O.) another cheese made from Murcian goat milk but with characteristics which differ from Queso al Vino

== Navarre ==
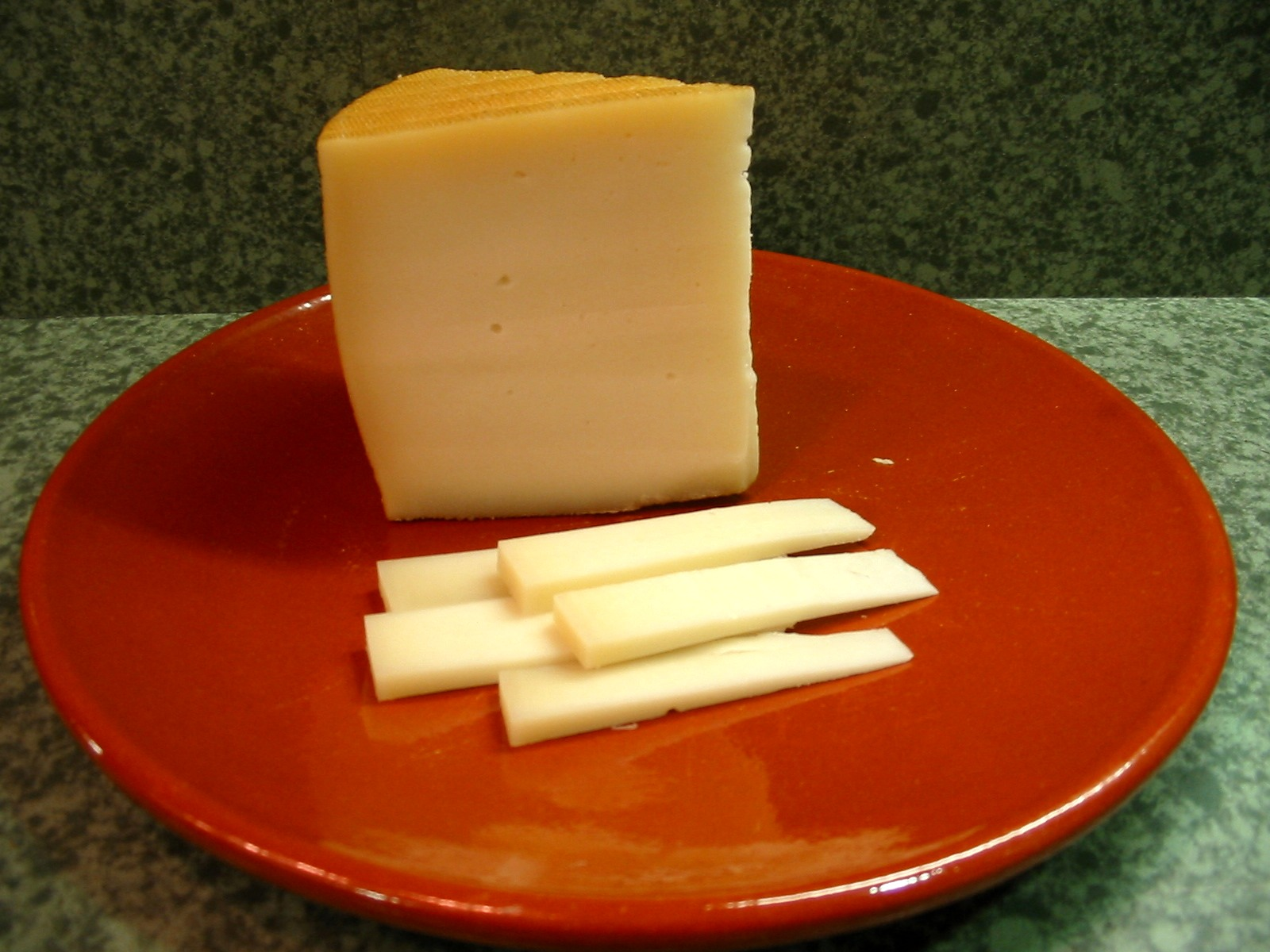
Queso Idiazábal

- Queso Idiazábal (P.D.O.)
- Queso Roncal (P.D.O.)
- Queso Urbasa, Menhaden sheep milk
- Queso Ribaforada, goat milk
- Queso Cabanillas, goat milk
- Queso Lesaca, cow milk or a mixture with goat milk

== Valencian Community ==
- Queso blanquet
- Queso de la Nucia
- Queso de cazoleta
- Queso de servilleta
- Queso Tronchón

== See also ==
- List of cheeses
- Spanish cuisine
