= San Simón da Costa =

Spanish smoked cheese

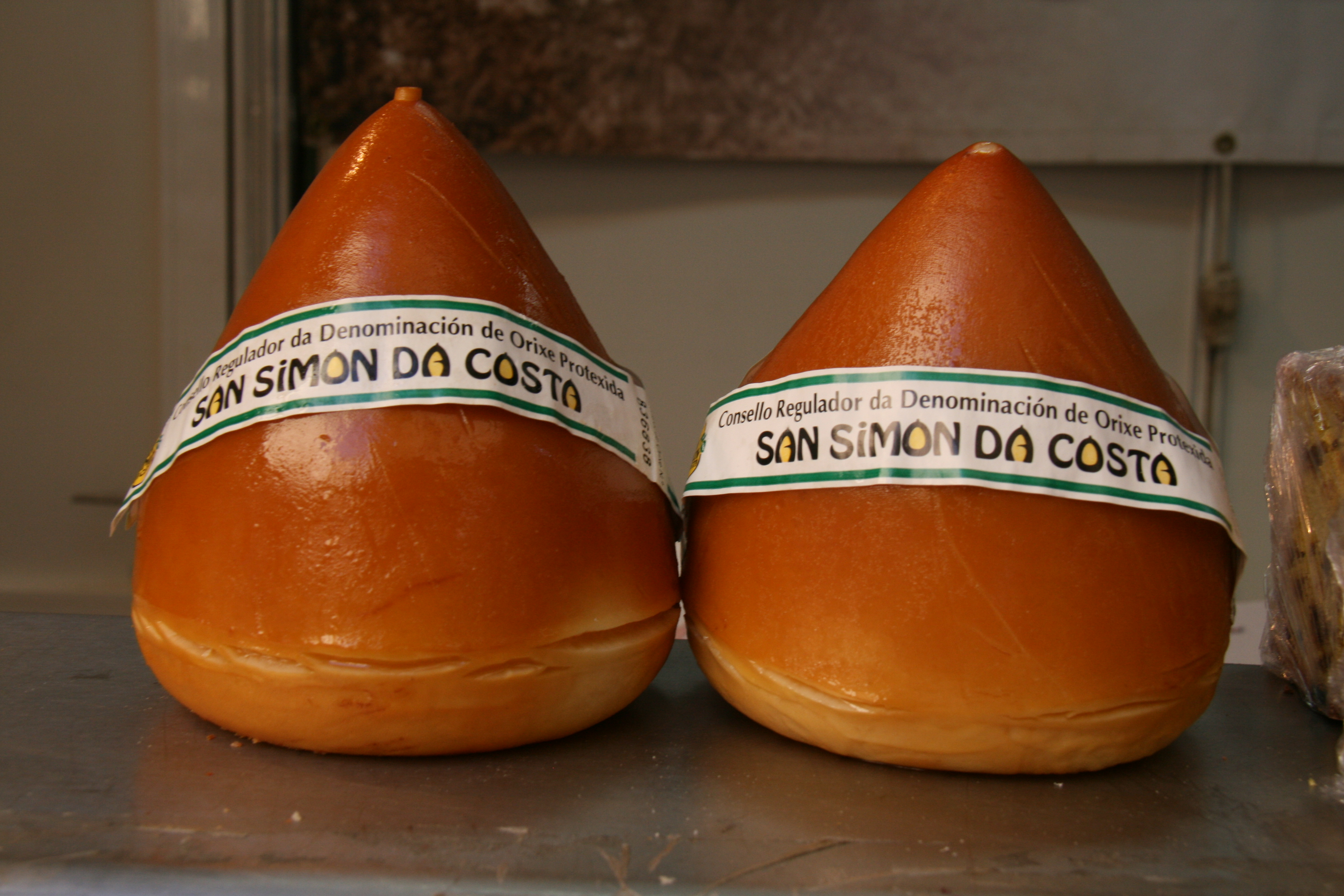
- Country of origin: Spain
- Region: Galicia
- Town: Vilalba
- Source of milk: Cow
- Pasteurised: Varies
- Texture: Semi-hard, creamy
- Fat content: 45% to 60% (dry matter)
- Protein content: At least 10%
- Dimensions: Height between 10 and 18 cm
- Weight: 0.4 to 1.5 kg
- Aging time: 30 to 45 days
- Certification: PDO

San Simón da Costa (Galician pronunciation: [san si'mon da 'kɔsta]) is a cow's milk cheese from the Terra Chá region of Galicia, in northwestern Spain. It is an uncooked, smoked cheese that is pressed into a pear shape, similar in form to Tetilla cheese. It has held a Protected Designation of Origin status since 2008.

== History ==
San Simón da Costa cheese possibly originated from the Castro culture of Galicia, the Celtic tribes who inhabited the mountain ranges of A Carba and O Xistral. While historical records from the Middle Ages are scarce, the cheese’s continued existence suggests it was a staple in daily life, likely used in tithes or as a gift to the nobility and clergy.

The earliest documented mention of the cheese dates back to 1857, in an article published in the La Aurora del Miño newspaper, which highlighted an agricultural exhibition held on Príncipe Pío in Madrid, where businessmen from Lugo presented forty different kinds of local products, including the cheese. In 1893, the Vilalba town hall approved the sale of two San Simón da Costa cheeses, which were sent to the Chicago World's Fair.

By the early 20th century, San Simón da Costa had become a regional specialty. In 1932, the local press reported its popularity at a national dairy competition in Madrid, with businesses like Lhardy even requesting regular deliveries.

The cheese was granted Protected Designation of Origin (PDO) status at the European level in 2008, ensuring its production adheres to traditional methods and is recognised for its quality and regional authenticity. In 2017, the PDO regulations were officially promulgated by the Spanish Government and the Xunta de Galicia, further solidifying its protected status.

The production of San Simón da Costa is approximately 400 tonnes per year and is available in markets across Europe, Japan, and the United States, with production consistently growing. Between 2000 and 2010, production grew by around 70%, increasing from 138 tonnes in 2000 to 451 tonnes in 2010. In 2010, 10% of the annual production was exported out of Spain.

== Production ==
San Simón da Costa cheese is produced exclusively in the nine municipalities of the Terra Chá region in Lugo, with the town of Vilalba being the primary production area. It is made from cow's milk, either raw or pasteurised, sourced from breeds such as the Galician Blonde, Swiss Brown, Holstein Friesian and their crossbreeds. The cows are traditionally pasture-fed, with a focus on local forage species like wild turnip (Brassica rapa) and wild cabbage (Brassica oleracea). The milk is coagulated using animal rennet or authorised coagulants, with a focus on preserving and using local bacterial strains.

After the curdling process, the curd is cut into grains between 5 and 12 mm in diameter. The cheese is then molded, pressed for at least 3 hours, and salted in brine. The aging process lasts at least 30 days for smaller cheeses ('bufón') and 45 days for larger ones, with the cheeses being turned and cleaned during this period. Once ready, the cheeses are smoked using birch wood stripped of its bark, imparting their characteristic colour and flavour.

The cheese can be found in two formats: large (between 13 and 18 cm in height, and between 0.8 and 1.5 kg in weight) and small or 'bufón' (between 10 and 13 cm in height, and between 400 and 800 g in weight).

== Properties ==
San Simón da Costa cheese has a distinctive, pear-shaped form, with a nipple-like peak at the top. The rind is smooth, hard, waxy, shiny, and brown in colour, measuring between 1 and 3 mm thick. The texture of the paste is semi-hard and creamy, with small irregular holes. The colour varies according to its maturation, from white in younger cheeses to yellow in more mature ones. The flavour is mild with a hint of spiciness, low in fat, slightly salty, and infused with the aroma of birch smoke.

The cheese has a fat content ranging from 40% to 60% (on a dry matter basis) and must have at least 55% dry matter. The pH of the cheese is between 5 and 5.6.

== See also ==
- List of cheeses
- List of Spanish cheeses
- Galician cuisine
