= Afuega'l pitu =

Asturian unpasteurized cow's milk cheese

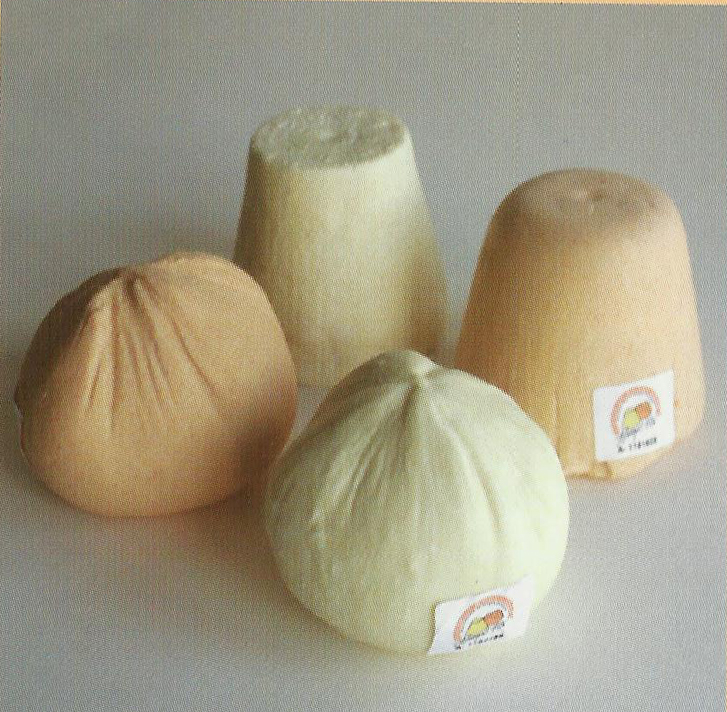
- Country of origin: Spain
- Region: Asturias
- Source of milk: Cows

Afuega'l pitu is an unpasteurised cow's milk cheese from Asturias, one of four Asturian cheeses (the others being Cabrales, Gamonéu cheese, and Casín cheese) to have been recognized with Protected Designation of Origin (Denominación de Origen, DO) by Spain and the European Union.

The name literally translates as "strangle the chicken" in the Asturian language and legend is that when the chicken ("pitu" in Asturian) is dead the cheese is ready. Production is centered in the municipalities of Grau, Les Regueres, Morcín, Pravia, Riosa, Salas, and Yernes y Tameza, the first having the largest production and being the headquarters of the council of Denomination of Origin.

The cheese is produced all year long although principally in spring and winter due to the elevated fat content in milk in the spring and winter months. Since 2008 it has enjoyed the recognition of the European Union as a Protected Designation of Origin (PDO).

== Process ==
The cheese is made from cow's milk from cows milked in the afternoon or evening and heated between 25 and 30 °C (77 and 86 °F) with a coagulant added so the milk forms curds. After midday the following day, the curds are cut and deposited in a mold to drain. From the mold it is passed to a sack or bag ("Fardela") for the "Trapu" version or left with the form given by the mold ("Troncado"-Trunk) like a bishop's mitre. Salt is added, as is Spanish paprika (pimentón) if desired. After a few days the period of curing starts with aging occurring on wooden planks for a period between a week and several months.

The resulting cheese is normally white (blanco), with a red (rojo) variety is also made where Spanish smoked paprika (pimentón) in its "sweet" and/or "spicy" ("picante") varieties are added to the cheese before moulding to shape using the cone-shaped form ("Troncado"-Trunk) or cloth bag ("Trapo" or "Trapu").

It also comes in soft and semi-hard varieties depending on the duration of curing.

== Varieties ==
=== Forms ===
There are two main varieties according to the form given to the cheese:

- Troncado/Atroncáu [Asturian] (Trunk): With a cone-shaped form like a bishop's mitre or inverted flowerpot from the mold used to drain the cheese.
- Trapo/Trapu (Rag/Cloth): Rounded like a chestnut with the form given by the cloth used to drain the cheese.

=== Color/Flavour ===
The other main distinction is whether or not paprika is added:

- Blanco/Blancu (White): Without Spanish paprika.
- Roxu/Rojo (Red): With sweet and/or hot Spanish paprika (according to the recipe of the artisan making the cheese).

=== Maturing Period ===
Depending on the length of time the cheese has been aged it can be:

- Soft
- Semi-cured
- Cured
