= Flor de Guía cheese =

Soft to semi-hard cheese of Gran Canaria, Spain, made of cow, goat, or sheep's milk

Flor de Guía
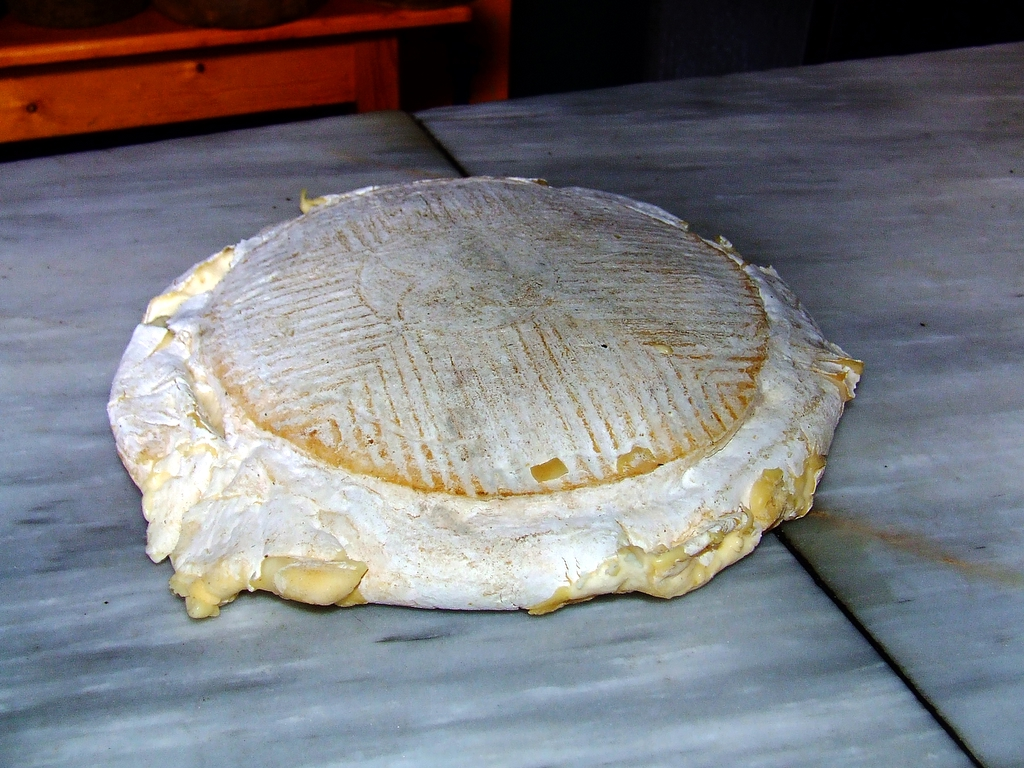
- Country of origin: Spain
- Region: Gran Canaria
- Town: S.Maria de Guía, Moya and Gáldar
- Source of milk: Cow, sheep and goat
- Texture: semi-hard to soft
- Named after: Santa María de Guía de Gran Canaria

Flor de Guía cheese is a Spanish cheese (Spanish: Queso de Flor de guía) made on the island of Gran Canaria in the Canary Islands. It has Denomination of Origin protection. The cheese is classified as fatty or semi-fatty and made from the milk from Canarian sheep, with milk from Canarian cows and/or goats. The milk from the sheep must constitute at least 60% and cows’ milk content must never exceed 40%. Goat milk must never exceed 10% of the mixture. The cheese is presented in flat cylindrical cheeses which normally measure 4–8 cm (1.5-3 inches) high and 20–30 cm (8-12 inches) across and weighing between 2 and 5 kg (4.5-11 pounds). The cheese gets its name from an area in northern Gran Canaria called Santa María de Guía, where the cheese is made, and ‘flor’ from the fact that juice from the flowerheads of a species of cardoon and globe artichoke are used to curdle the milk.

== Manufacture ==
The cheese is made in three varieties:

- “Flor de Guía”, which uses only the juice of the flowerheads of the cardoon in the coagulation.
- “Half Flor de Guía” (Sp: media Flor de guía) which uses 50% cardoon juice and 50% globe artichoke flower juice to coagulate the milk.
- “Guía cheese” which uses some vegetable coagulant and some animal coagulant, usually rennet from young goats or from lambs.

In addition, the cheeses can be classified as semi-cured and cured, according to the length of maturation. The cheese is made only in the neighbouring municipalities of Santa María de Guía, Moya and Gáldar and is seasonal in production only being manufactured between January and July.

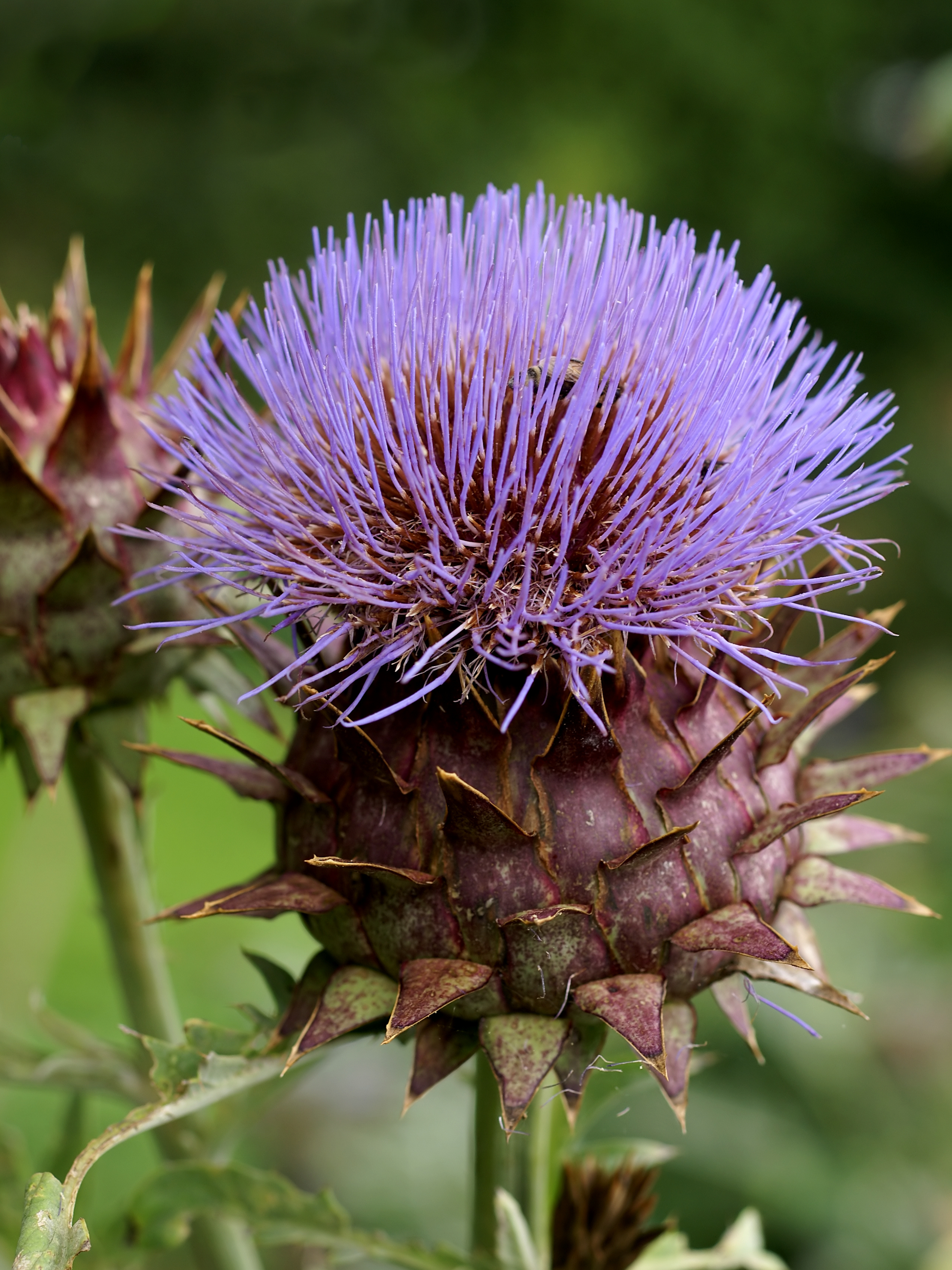
Cardoon flower

The milk is provided by sheep which are kept on open terrain, free to move to new pastures within the designated geographical area. Their food is largely wild plants and grass supplemented by concentrates when necessary. The cows are kept stabled for most of the year but when conditions are favourable they are tethered in open pasture. The goats are grazed on fenced land within the specified area and gathered in at night. The animals may be milked mechanically or manually. The former are conditions of the Spanish Denomination of Origin.

The curdling medium may be vegetable or animal depending on the type of cheese being made. Salt is added to the milk but not exceeding 30 grams (1.1 oz) per 100 litres (galls) of milk. For Flor cheese, the vegetable rennet (liquid extract of the cardoon) is added when the milk has been heated to between 28 °C and 35 °C and maintained for 60 to 90 minutes. For Half-Flor cheese the curdling agent must be 50% cardoon juice and 50% another vegetable or authorized rennet. It is heated to 28–38 °C and maintained for a maximum of 1 hour. For Guía cheese the rennet used may be animal, vegetable or chemical or a mixture. The milk is heated to 30–38 °C and maintained for as long as an analysis shows it to be ready.

The curd is then cut to the size of between rice grains and chickpeas with the typical lyres. It stands and drains and is then put into moulds for pressing. The pressing and moulding may be done manually or mechanically. The moulds for Flor de guía cheese have marks on their interiors to impart the geometric shape of a flower on the rind. Salt is sprinkled lightly on the face of the cheese in addition to the previously added salt. The cheese remains inside the ring-mould for 24 hours. It must then be matured for a minimum of 15 days and may be matured up to 60 days. During this time the cheeses are turned regularly and smoothed to improved their appearance. They may also be oiled with olive oil or some other vegetable oil. The older cheeses may have pimentón or gofio applied to the exterior. Any products used on the exterior of the cheese must be indicated on the packing.

== Flavour ==
Overall the flavour is of dairy products with a saltiness, varying slightly according to the milks used. It does not have a very intense flavour, a creaminess and sometimes can be a little acid or spicy.

== Texture ==
The texture is dense and without cavities. It can vary between firm and soft depending on its maturation. The colour is from ivory-white to yellow, depending on its age.

== Rind ==
The rind can vary in colour from dark brown in long-matured cheeses to an ivory-white to cream on the less matured cheeses. The thickness of the rind depends on the maturation, a medium thick rind on older cheeses and a very thin rind on the less matured specimens. There may or may not be a flower design on the top face of the cheese.
