= Ibores cheese =

Spanish cheese made from unpasteurized goats' milk in Extremadura

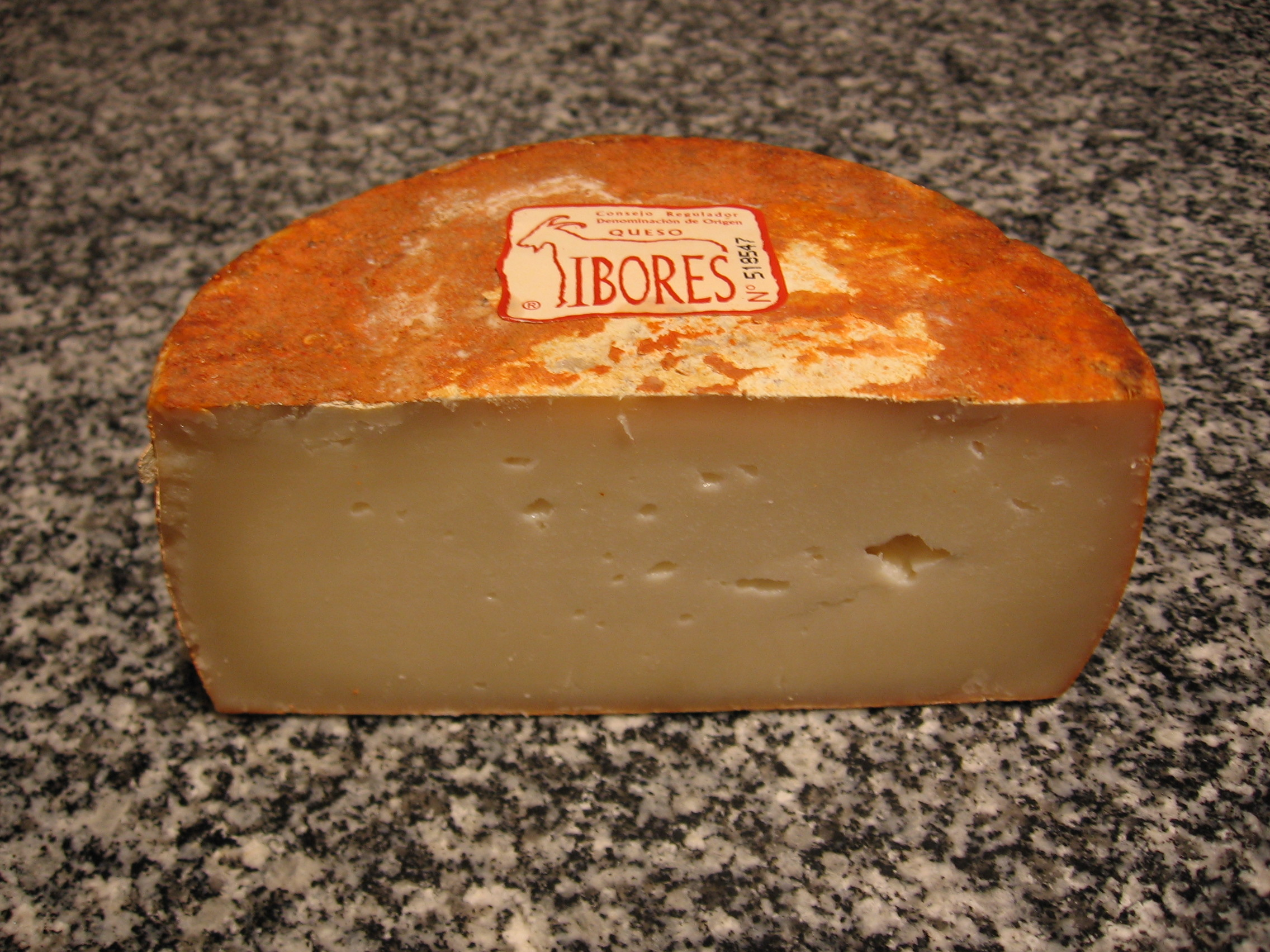
Ibores cheese

The Ibores cheese is a Spanish cheese made from unpasteurized goats’ milk in Extremadura. It has a Denomination of Origin protection in the European Union and is made specifically in the districts of Ibores, Villuercas, La Jara y Trujillo in the south east of the Province of Cáceres. It is a fatty cheese made exclusively from the milk of Serrana, Verata, Retinta breeds and crosses between them and only from farms registered with the regulatory council. The cheeses are flat cylindrical and measure 5–9 cm (2-3.5 inches) high and 11–15 cm (4-6 inches) across. They weigh from 600 to 1200 g (1-2 lbs).

== Manufacture ==
The milk is coagulated by natural rennet or some other authorised, when the milk reaches 28 to 32 °C and takes from 60 to 90 minutes. The curd is then cut to grains of 5–10 mm and allowed to drain. The curd is then placed in moulds and subjected to a pressure of 1-2k/cm2 for 3–8 hours. After this the cheeses are salted, either dry salt rubbed onto the outside of the cheese or the cheese is immersed in a brine bath for a maximum of 24 hours. The cheeses are then allowed to mature for a minimum of 60 days. For the cheese to be labelled ‘artesanal’ it must have matured for at least 100 days.

== Flavour ==
Gentle to moderate aroma of goat, a characteristic taste with some slight acidity, at times a little peppery and slightly salty with some goat flavour in the after-taste.

== Rind ==
Smooth and not too hard with a natural colour of straw to dark ochre if it has been rubbed with pimentón or olive oil. The rind of older cheeses may be coloured by various moulds which can populate the surface, a greyish or reddish-orange if rubbed with pimentón and yellow ochre if oiled.

== Texture ==
The cheese is ivory-white and firm. It has a buttery and moist texture and is friable but elastic. It has a few small cavities unevenly dispersed in the cheese.

== Uses ==
It is usually eaten as a snacking cheese with wine or beer or as part of a meal.

== See also ==
- List of cheeses
