= Palmero cheese =

Goat's milk cheese of La Palma, Canary Islands

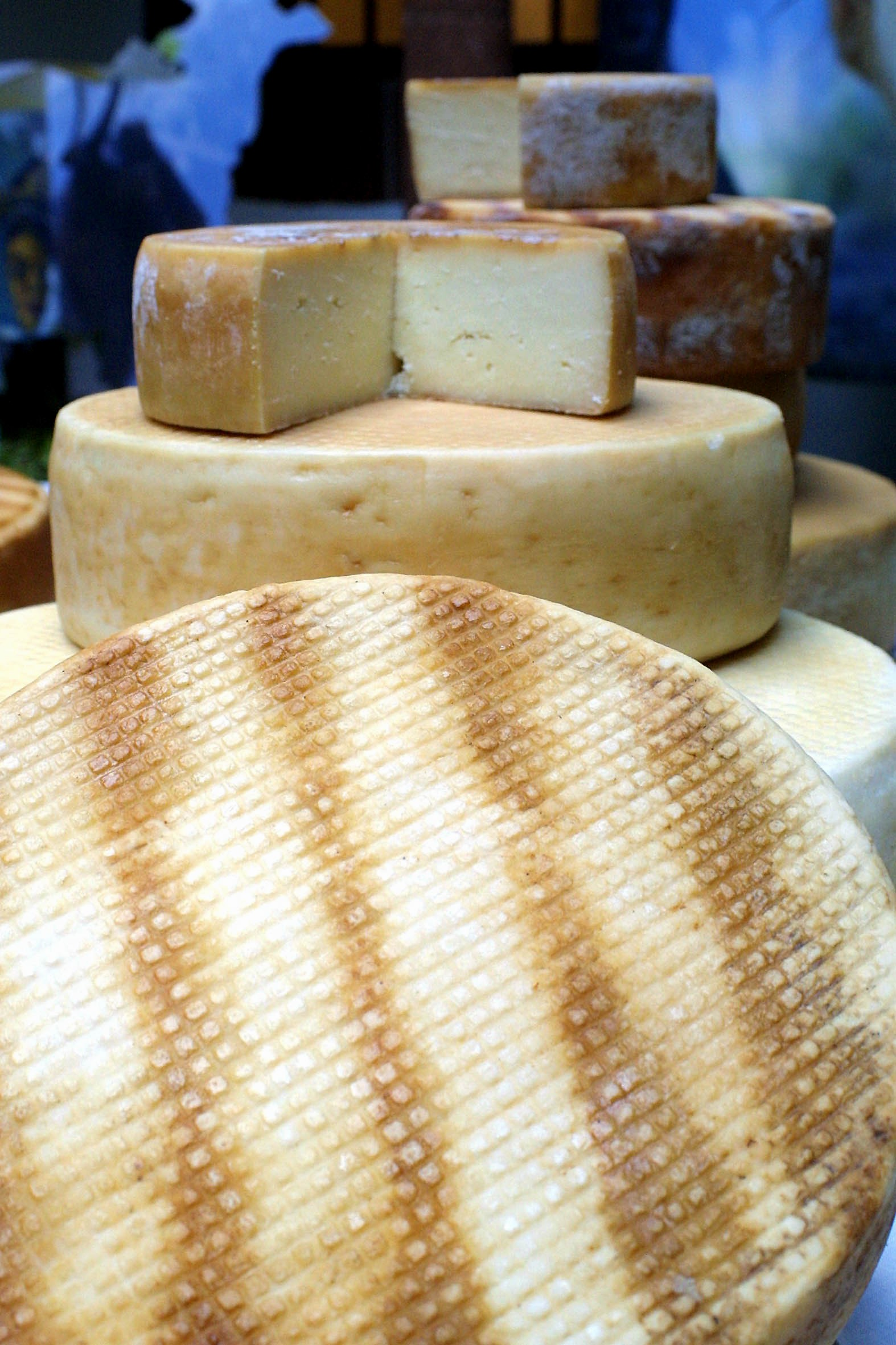
- Country of origin: Spain
- Source of milk: goat milk
- Named after: La Palma

Palmero cheese (Sp: queso palmero or queso de La Palma) is a Spanish plain or lightly smoked cheese from the island of La Palma in the Canary Islands. It is made of unpasteurised goats milk and has Denomination of Origin protection. The goats are free to graze on natural wild plants which are available all year round. The cheese is made on many small farms all over the island. It is presented in cylindrical cheeses of up to 15 kilos (33 lbs).

== Manufacture ==
The milk is collected after milking and coagulated before it has cooled, around 27 to 33C (80-91 °F), with natural rennet from goat kids. The coagulation usually takes about 45 minutes, after which the curd is cut into small grains to facilitate the drainage of the whey. The curd is then put into moulds and pressed and then left to drain. After this the cheeses are salted on the exterior with dry sea salt collected on the island. Some cheese is sold as fresh and some is smoked. The smoking is carried out using local materials such as almond shells, dried cactus or canarian pine. Following the smoking the cheeses are left to mature in local caves or air-conditioned rooms standing on plastic mesh which imparts a pattern on the rind. The cheeses are turned regularly and the rinds are rubbed with olive oil or gofio to protect them.

== Flavour ==
The flavour is clean and characteristic of goat milk and a natural coagulation with a slight acidity and slight saltiness. The smoked cheese has a very slight smoky taste.

== Texture ==
In fresh cheese it is soft and shiny white. In more mature cheese it is firm but elastic and of an ivory-white to pale cream colour. The cheese cuts cleanly but very small cavities evenly spread through the cheese may be visible.

== Rind ==
The rind on fresh cheese is very thin. On mature cheese it is of medium thickness and the whole of the flat faces are usually marked with a grid of small squares. The colour can vary from a pale beige-cream to light or medium brown, depending on the maturity and smoking method.

== Uses ==
Palmero cheese is eaten thinly sliced and unprepared or it may be grilled and eaten with the local mojo sauce.

== See also ==
- List of smoked foods
