= Valdeón cheese =

Spanish blue cheese from León

Queso de Valdeón
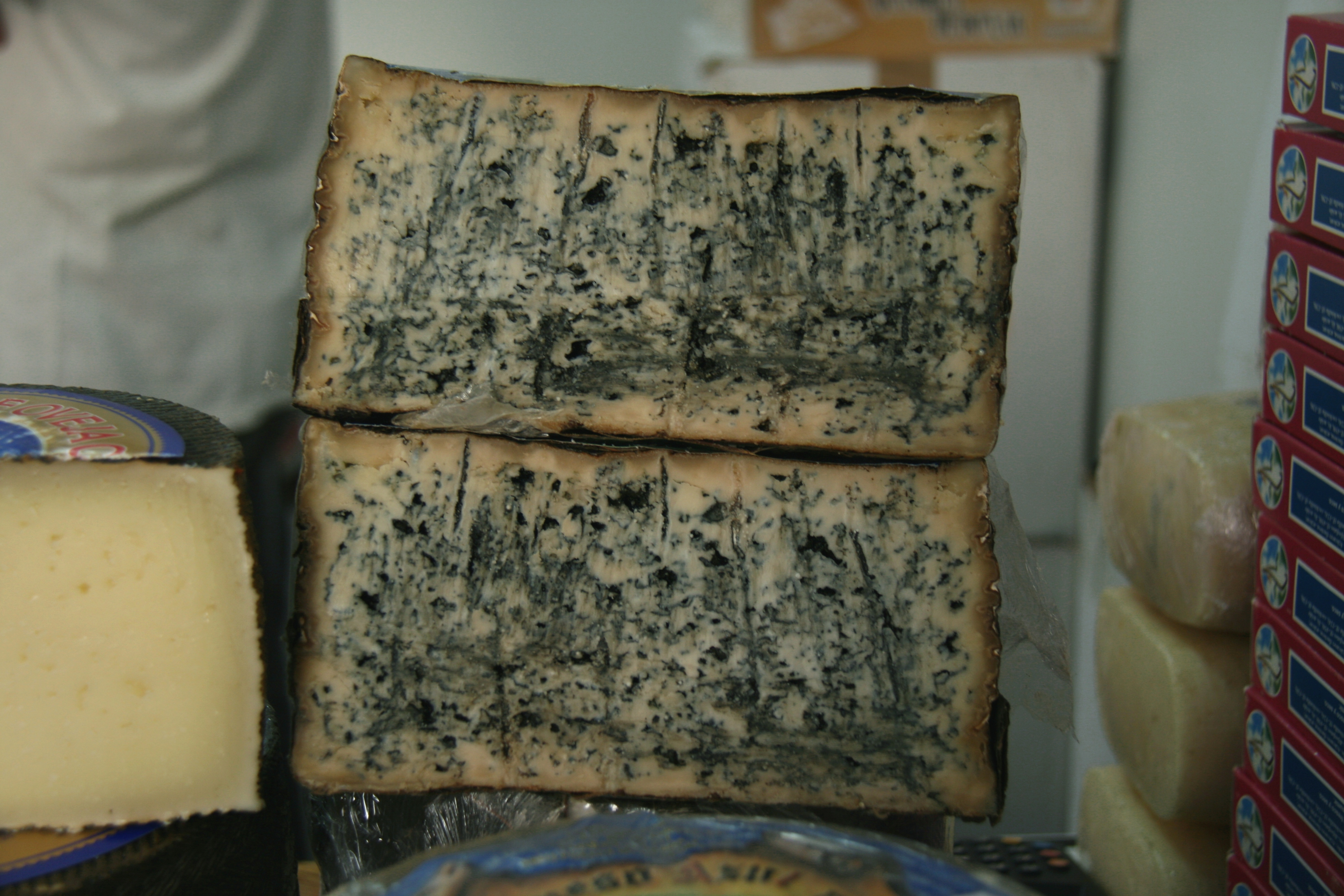
- Country of origin: Spain
- Region: León
- Source of milk: cow's milk or from a mixture of cow's milk and ewe's and/or goat's milk
- Pasteurized: sometimes
- Texture: semi-soft
- Aging time: 1.5 - 2 months
- Certification: PGI
- Named after: Valle de Valdeón[*]

Queso de Valdeón (Queisu de Valdión, in Leonese language) is a Spanish blue cheese from León. The cheese is made in Posada de Valdeón, in the northeast of the province of León, and is wrapped in sycamore maple (Acer pseudoplatanus), or chestnut leaves before being sent to market. The cheese has a very intense blue flavor, but is not as yellowed or as biting as its cousin Cabrales.

Queso de Valdeón has PGI status.

The production of cheese in the Valdeón valley dates back to pre-Roman times, being made at that time with goat's milk as raw material. During the 19th century, cheese production was one of the main occupations in the area, since the production of milk from the cattle that grazed on the high-altitude sheepfolds during the summer was transformed into cheese in the cabins at the top or was transported to the villages of the valley. Due to the important natural barriers that delimit the valley, it has a microclimate that favors the development of the microbial flora that characterizes these cheeses.

== See also ==
- Blue cheese
- Spanish cheeses
- Leonese cuisine
