= Rubia Gallega =

Spanish breed of cattle

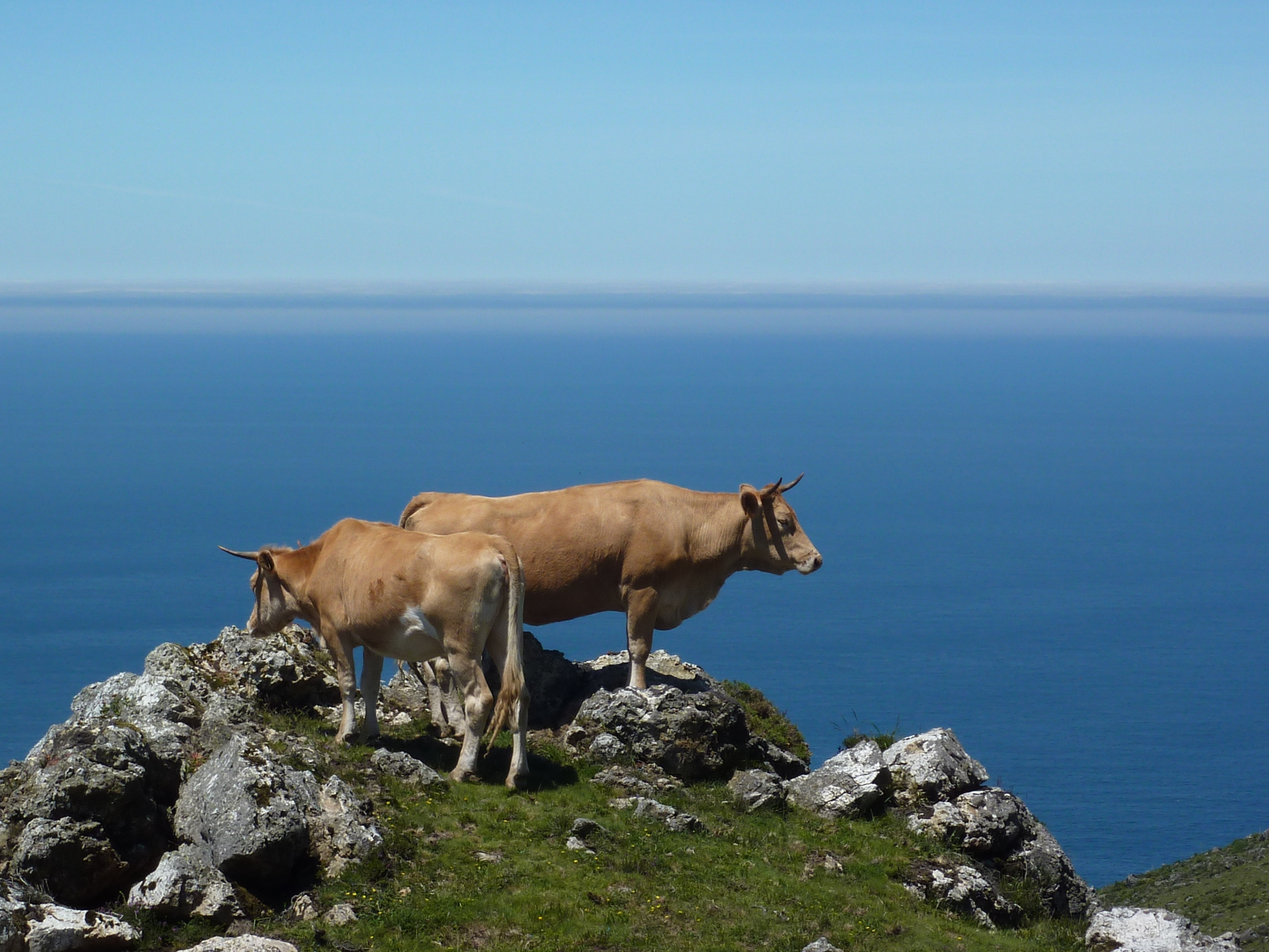
- At Garita de Erbeira, near Cape Ortegal

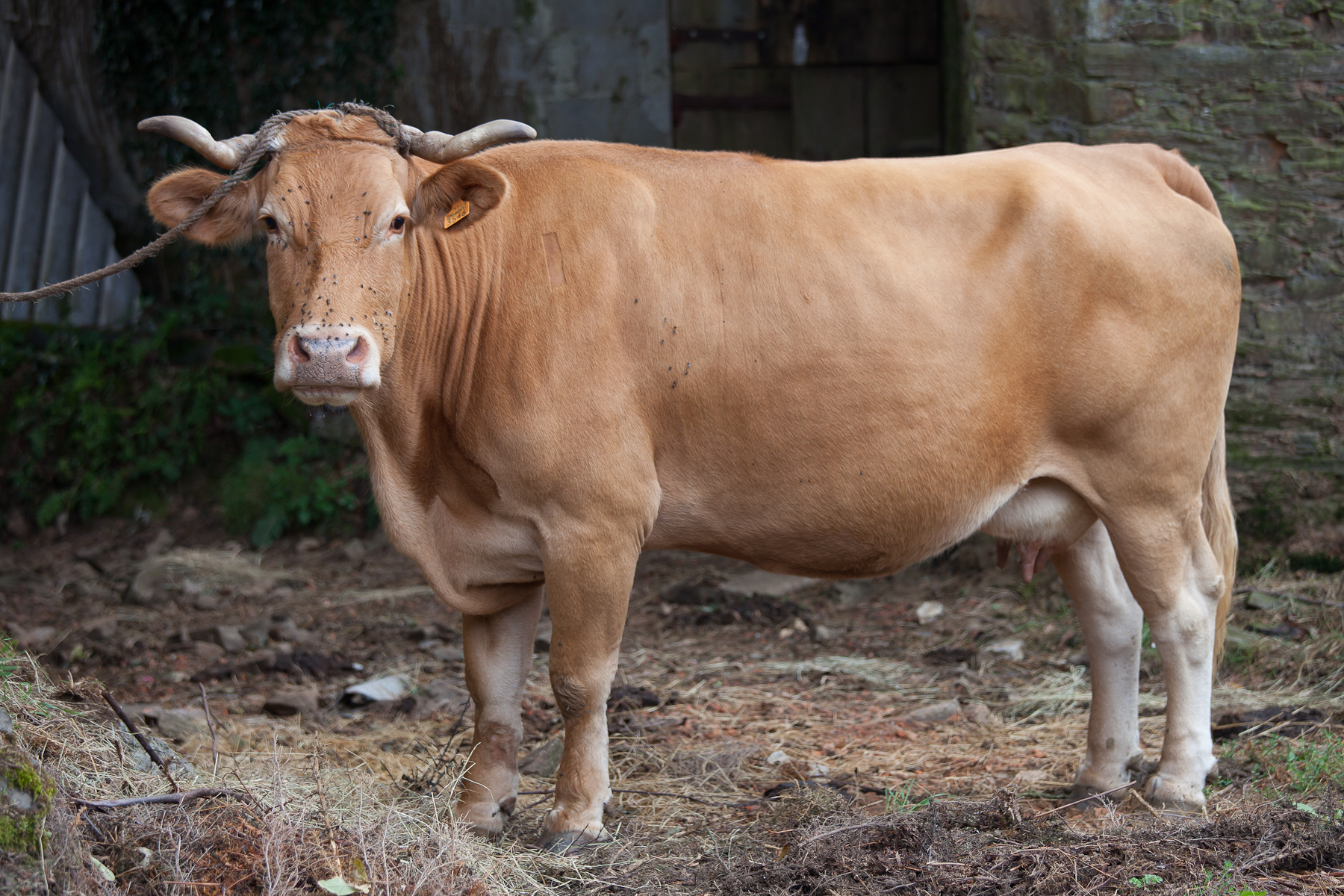
- Cow at Cumbraos, Mesía, in the province of A Coruña
- Conservation status: FAO (2007): not at risk; DAD-IS (2025): not at risk
- Other names: Galician Blond; Galician: Rubia Galega
- Country of origin: Spain
- Distribution: Galicia, principally the province of Lugo
- Standard: MAGRAMA (in Spanish)
- Use: meat

Traits
- Weight: Male: 1000 kg; Female: 700 kg
- Height: Male: 145 cm; Female: 135 cm
- Skin colour: unpigmented
- Coat: red-blond, wheaten or cinnamon-coloured
- Horn status: horned
- Cattle; Bos (primigenius) taurus

The Rubia Gallega is a Spanish breed of cattle native to the autonomous community of Galicia in north-western Spain. It is raised mainly for meat. It is distributed throughout Galicia, with about 75% of the population concentrated in the province of Lugo. The coat may be red-blond, wheaten, or cinnamon-coloured.

== History ==
A herdbook was established in 1933. In the twentieth century there was some cross-breeding with stock of the Portuguese Barrosã, the Braunvieh and Simmental of Switzerland, and the British Shorthorn.

The total registered Rubia Gallega population at the end of 2015 was 39971, of which almost all were in Galicia. The cattle are distributed throughout the autonomous community, with about 75% of the population concentrated in Lugo. It is found particularly at altitudes above about 550 m in the mountainous areas of the northern part of the province, including the Serra da Carba, the Serra de Lourenzá, and the Serra de Xistral.

== Use ==
The Rubia Gallega is primarily a beef cattle breed. The milk is used in the production of Tetilla cheese, which has had Denominación de Origen certification since 1993 and European DOP certification since 1996. The Rubia Gallega is easily handled and is suitable for draught work; however, it is slow in comparison to oxen of other breeds.
