= Mallorca cheese =

Spanish semi-hard cheese from Mallorca

Mallorca
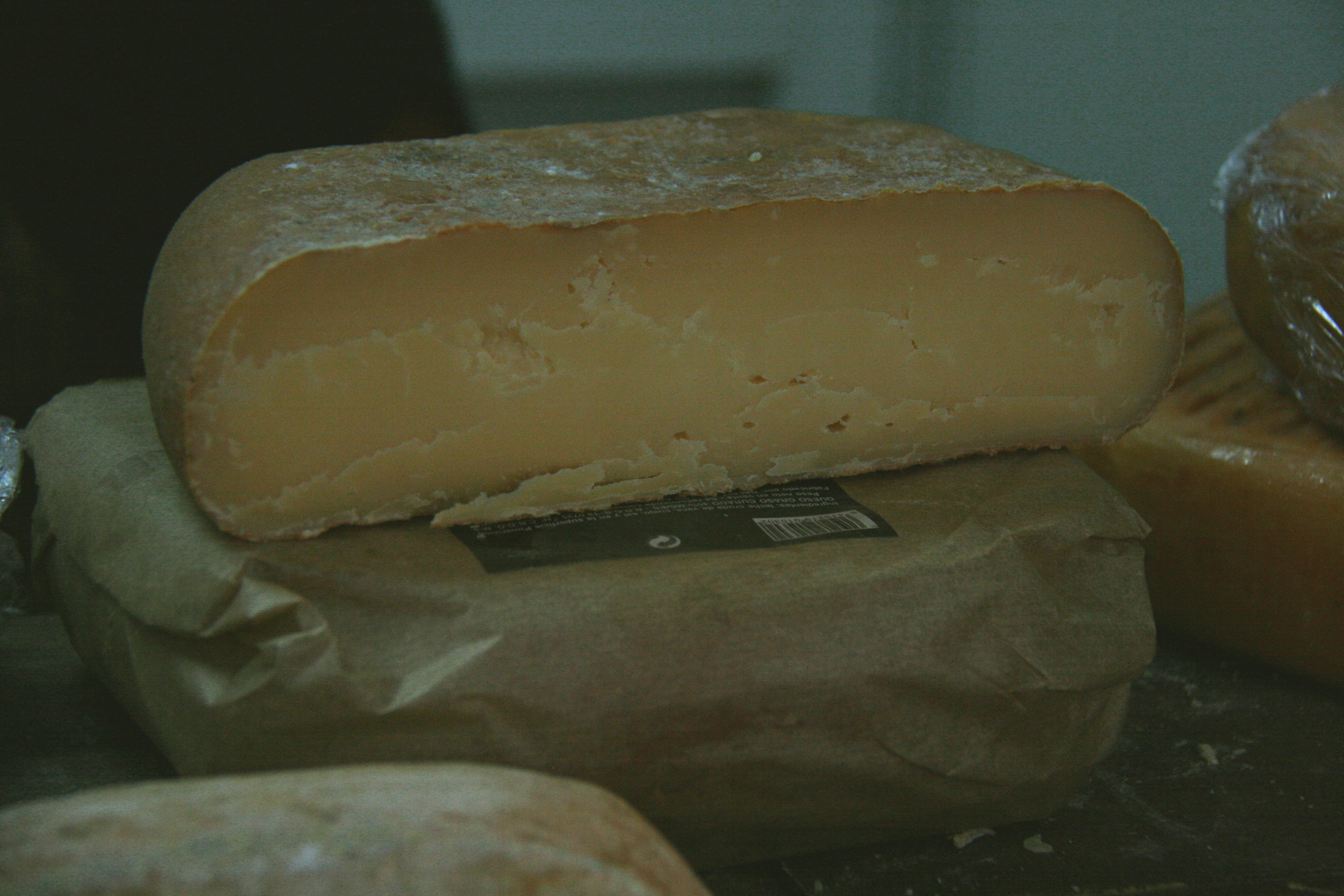
- Mallorca cheese (cows' milk)
- Other names: Mallorquín
- Country of origin: Spain
- Region: Mallorca
- Source of milk: Cow, goat, sheep
- Texture: Semi-hard

Mallorca cheese (in Mallorquín: formatge mallorquí) is a Spanish cheese made exclusively on the island of Mallorca, one of the Balearic Islands in the Mediterranean Sea. It has Protected Designation of Origin and is made from the pasteurized milk of cows, goats and/or sheep which live on the island. The cheeses are slightly tapering, flat cylinders which measure 12–20 cm (5–8 in) across and 7–9 cm (3–4 in) high. They weigh from 750 to 4 kg (1,653.5 to 8.8 lb). Mallorca cheese is produced in three types:

- Semi-cured — matured for at least 20 days.
- Cured — matured for at least 45 days.
- Aged — matured for at least 100 days.

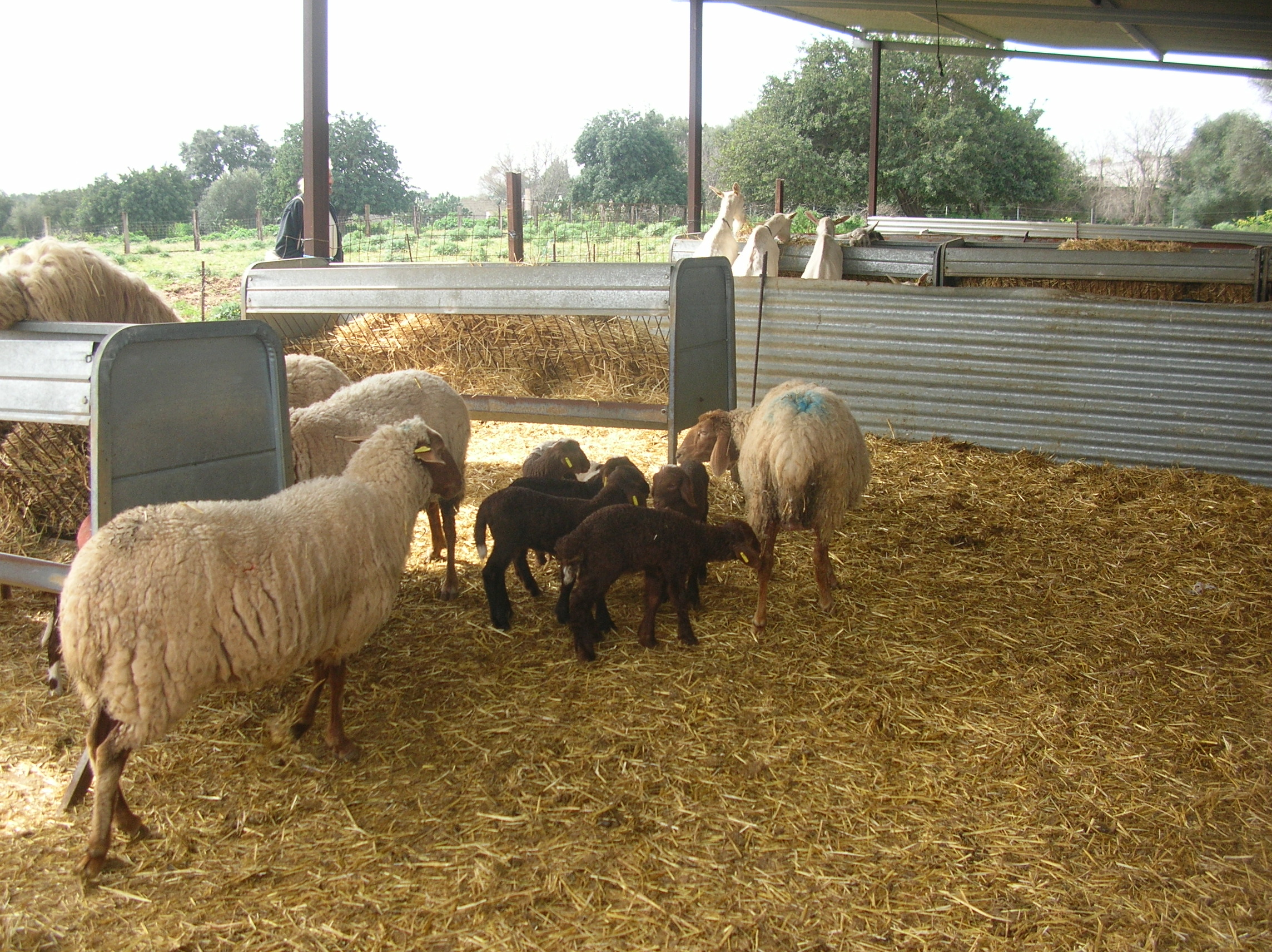
Herd of red sheep on Mallorca

== Manufacture ==
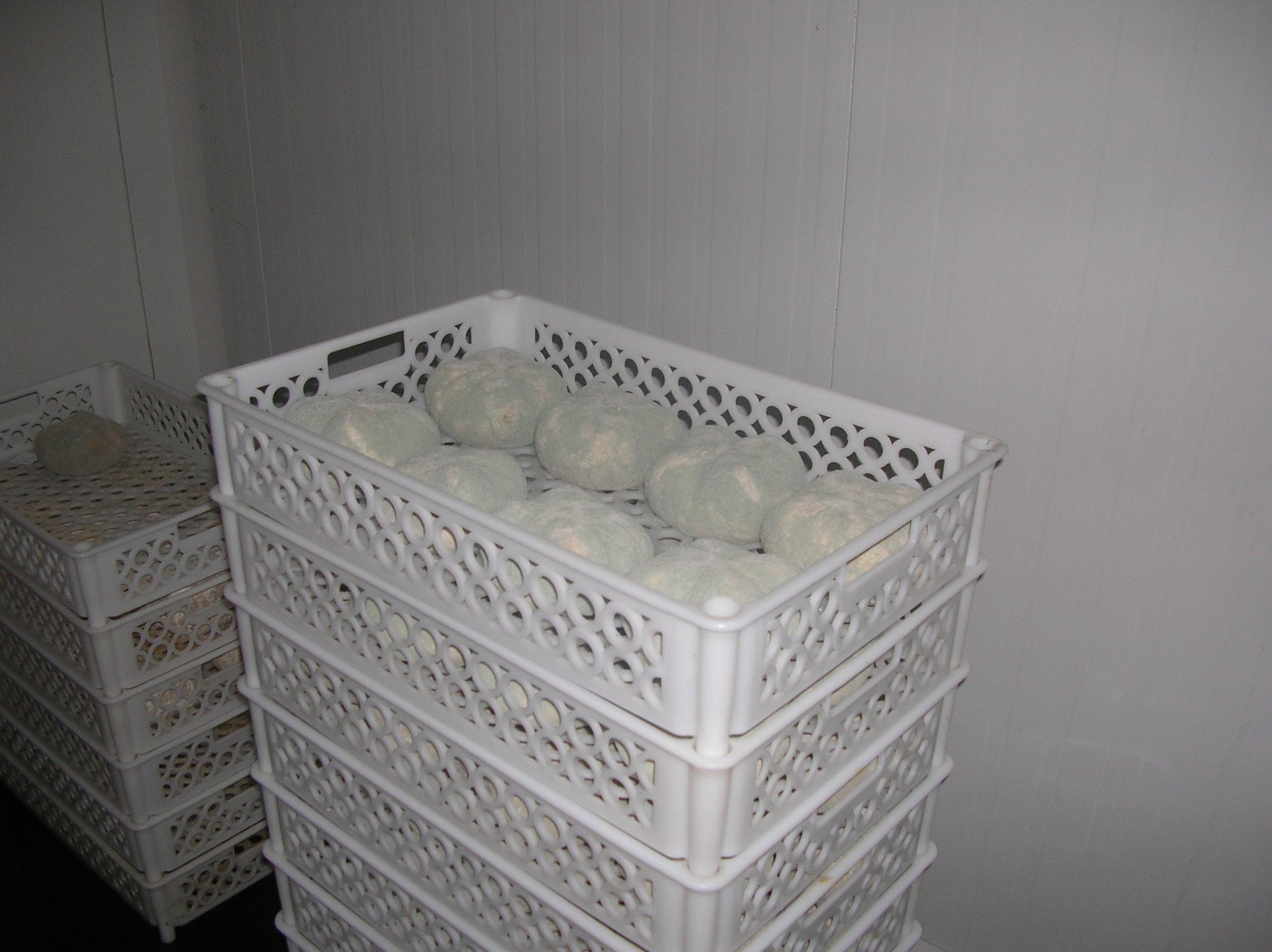
Modern cheese curing process from Mallorca.

The milk is coagulated by animal rennet when the milk is 30–35 °C (86–95 °F) and for a period not less than 30 minutes. The curd is cut mechanically with horizontal and vertical lyres until the curd is reduced to pieces of less than 20 mm (0.79 in) to facilitate drainage of the whey. The curd is then placed in moulds inside a linen or cotton lining, within the mould it is subjected to a pressure of between 2 and 6 kg/cm^{2} for at least 3 hours. The pressed cheeses are then salted in a brine bath for at least 18 hours. The cheeses are then allowed to mature in a room at a temperature of 10–17 °C (50–63 °F) at a relative humidity of up to 95%. The minimum time for curing is 20 days. From 7 days after the brine bath the cheeses are turned and the rinds rubbed with olive oil. This procedure is repeated several times assisting the maturation and causing the rind to achieve the characteristic colour and aroma. The production is seasonal, since it is not made in summer.

Typical loafs of Mallorquin cheese are rather small, approximately 6 x 15 cm, weighing between 500 and 1500 grams. The shape is square with rounded corners.

== Flavour ==
The aroma is predominantly dairy, smelling a little of butter or yoghurt in older cheeses. The intensity of the aroma increases with maturation of the cheese. The taste is slightly salty and slightly acid, the after-taste increases with the age of the cheese. Well matured cheese may have a slight pepperiness and a slight astringency.

== Texture ==
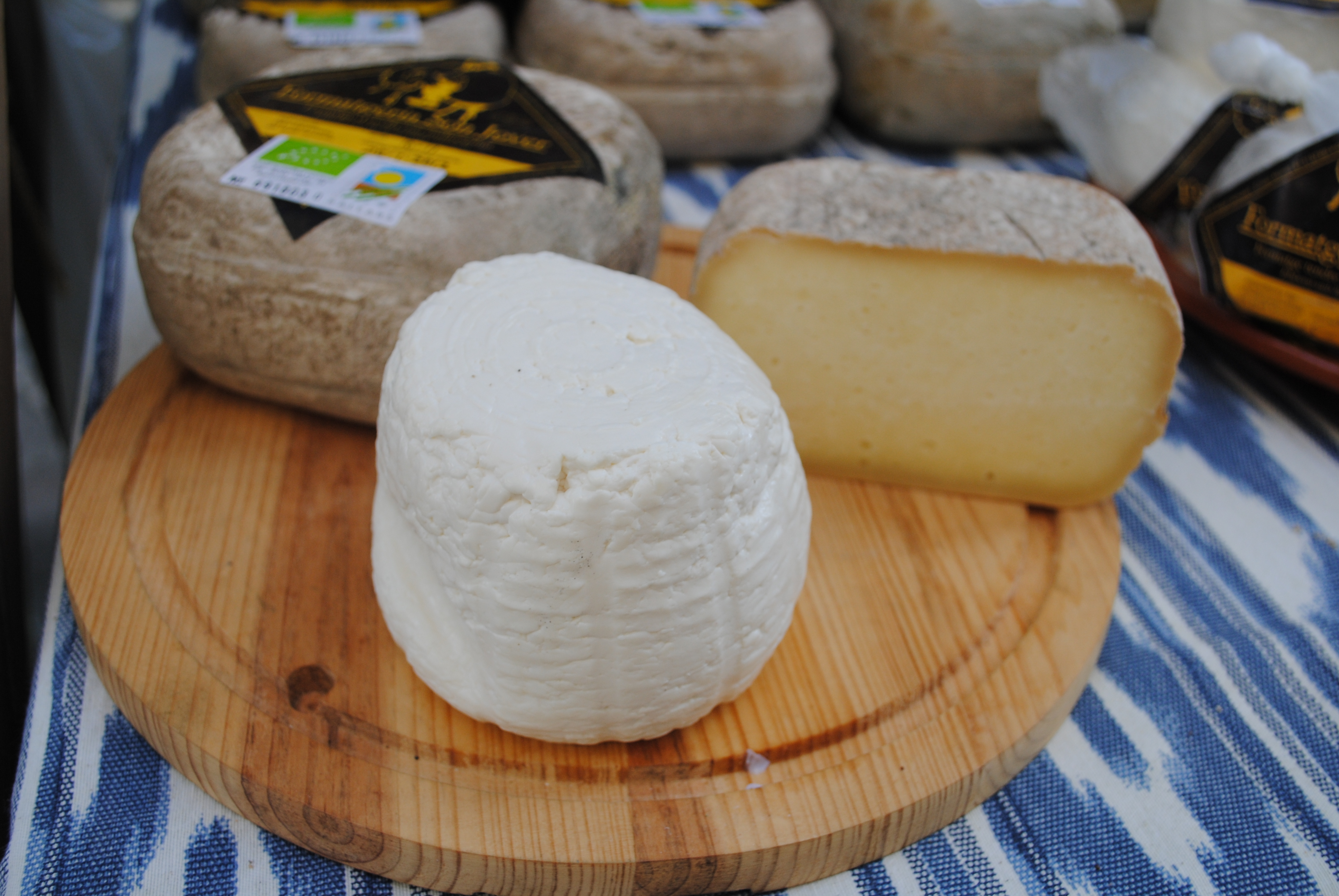
Soft and cured Mallorca cheese.

The cheese cuts easily, the cut surface being smooth and slightly shiny. The texture is firm and dense but a little elastic and white to ivory-white in colour. Depending on the age of the cheese there may be a few small cavities throughout the cheese.

== Rind ==
The colour can vary from yellow to brownish, depending on the age of the cheese. The rind is soft and of medium thickness.

== Uses ==
Eaten as a sliced snack either alone with wine or beer or as part of a meal with fruit and/or nuts.

=== Mallorcan cheese in medieval Catalan cuisine ===
Vinyoles mentions the following culinary specialties in which the use of Mallorcan cheese is documented:

- The sauce known as "allimantega" (made with garlic, butter, Mallorcan cheese and eggs).
- The sauce known as "almadroc" (made with garlic and Mallorcan cheese).
- Noodles (scratched).
- Macaroni (grated).
- Rubiols (fresh cheese, Mallorcan cheese and eggs).
- Goat filling (this stuffing is documented on the table of Pere III: leafy parsley, mescal, honey and Mallorcan cheese).
- Fried cheeses (they are documented in the table of King Peter III, "for dinner").
- Mallorcan cheese with pears.

== See also ==
- List of cheeses – List of cheeses by place of origin
