= Alpujarra cheese =

Spanish cheese from the eastern region of Andalusia

Alpujarras cheese is a Spanish cheese from the eastern region of Andalusia, which includes the provinces of Granada, Almería and the Penibética mountain chain. The cheese takes its name from La Alpujarra (or Las Alpujarras), a mountainous region which occupies a part of southern Granada province and western Almeria province. This area has a long history and tradition of goatherding. Alpujarras cheese is made from the milk of the White Andalusian domesticated goat.

The cheese is made as a fresh or matured variety and is classified as fatty to extra fatty. The presentation of the mature cheese is in the form of cylinders, rather wider than they are high. The rind faces are usually marked with patterns of flowers and the sides with lines, which are intended to simulate the imprint of rushes, including the authorising mark of the protected designation of origin P.D.O. The cheese is sold in pieces of between 500–1,000 g (18–35 oz). if fresh, and up to 2 kg (4.4 lb) if cured.

== Manufacturing process ==
Made from fresh milk which is aromatic and high in fats, the milk is pasteurised if used for fresh cheese but left raw if used for cured cheese. The milk is curdled with rennet from young goats which gives the best result and gives the final cheese the best possible qualities. The milk is heated to 30-32 °C and the rennet is added. The coagulation takes between 30 and 45 minutes but can sometimes take up to two hours. The curd is then cut with a so-called lyre into pieces about the size of a pea or bean to facilitate the draining of the whey. It is left to rest for a few minutes before the moulding process where the curd is put into baskets, in old times made of rushes but nowadays made of more hygienic plastic. These baskets have, on their inner surface, the imprints that will show on the rind of the cheese. After 48 hours of pressing they are salted by being placed in an 18% brine at a temperature of 12-14 °C for about 24 hours. The cheeses are then placed in ventilated, high-humidity rooms at 10-12 °C to mature. The fresh cheese can be eaten within 60 days but the mature cheese must remain for at least 60 days and sometimes may be left for up to 4 months.

== Characteristics ==
This is a cheese with a strong flavour, it has a lacteal base, slightly salty and a little peppery. It is buttery to the palate from the high level of fat it contains. The flavour may vary a little depending on the time of year it was made. The fresh cheese is a little sweeter and more milky. It is not recommended that this cheese is eaten after about 9 months due to the degradation of the fats and the release of caproic fatty acids that will affect the flavour. It is usually have a cylindric shape.

=== Texture ===
The mature cheese has a firm, non-elastic texture, typical of the way this kind of cheese is made and there are often little cavities evenly spaced throughout the cheese. The color is a matte, ivory-white. The fresh cheese is soft and a shiny white.

=== Rind ===
The rind is normally natural, clean and a yellowy straw colour. It may be oiled with olive oil. After maturation the rind can turn dark brownish with possibly some green flecks caused by moulds growing on the surface. Fresh cheese has no appreciable rind.

== Uses ==
It is recommended that Alpujarra cheese is eaten with white wine of the Jumilla or Cariñena variety, it also goes well with Amontillado and fino sherry. It can be enjoyed as an accompaniment to a range of dishes and is also enjoyable to eat with dried fruit and nuts. Fresh cheese is commonly eaten sliced and grilled as a starter.

== See also ==
- List of cheeses
