= Gamonéu cheese =

Spanish firm cheese made from cow, goat, and sheep's milk

Gamonéu
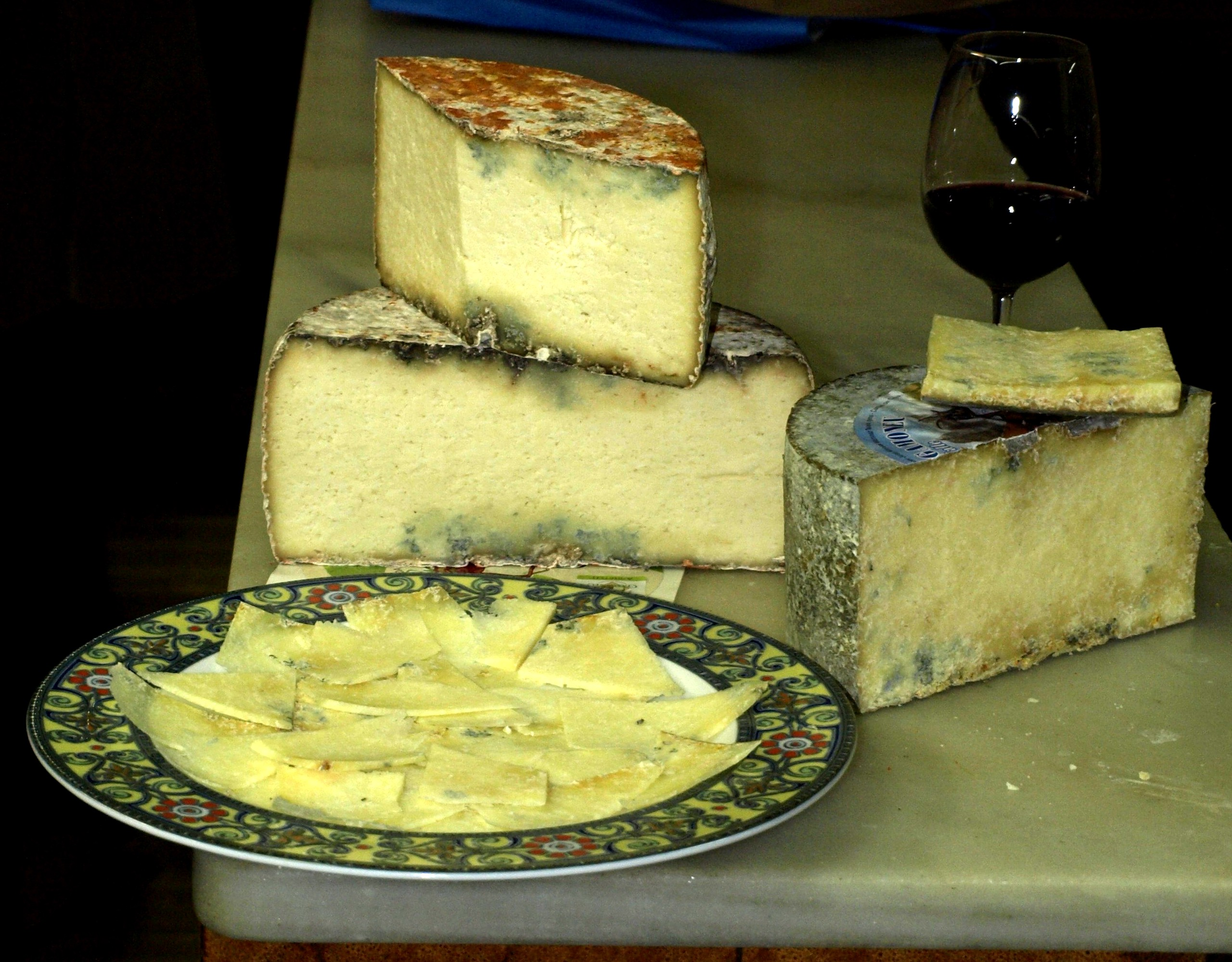
- Other names: Camonéu
- Country of origin: Spain
- Region: Asturias
- Source of milk: Cows, sheep, goats.
- Texture: firm, crumbly
- Named after: Gamonéu[*]

Gamonéu cheese (Spanish: Queso de Gamonéu or Queso de Gamonedo. Asturian: Quesu Gamonéu) is a fatty Spanish cheese made in certain parts of the Principality of Asturias. Taking its name from the village of Gamonéu where it was originally made, Gamonéu cheese has a Protected Designation of Origin. It is a lightly smoked cheese with a thin, natural rind that is coloured brownish with some red, green and blue patches. Moulds on the rind slightly invade the interior of the cheese. Similar to other cheeses in the region, Gamonéu is made from a combination of cow, goat and sheep milks. Gamonéu cheese is sold in the form of a truckle cylinders with flat ends in weights varying between 500g (18 oz) to 7 kg (15 lbs). Gamonéu comes in two distinct forms: "del Puertu", which is made in the high passes and "del Valle", which is made in the lower valleys. Gamonéu del Puertu is harder and drier and is the rarer of the two forms as production is limited to the summer months in the uplands. Gamonéu del Valle is richer and creamer and production continues year-round.

== See also ==
- List of smoked foods
