= Tetilla cheese =

Spanish regional cow's-milk cheese

Tetilla
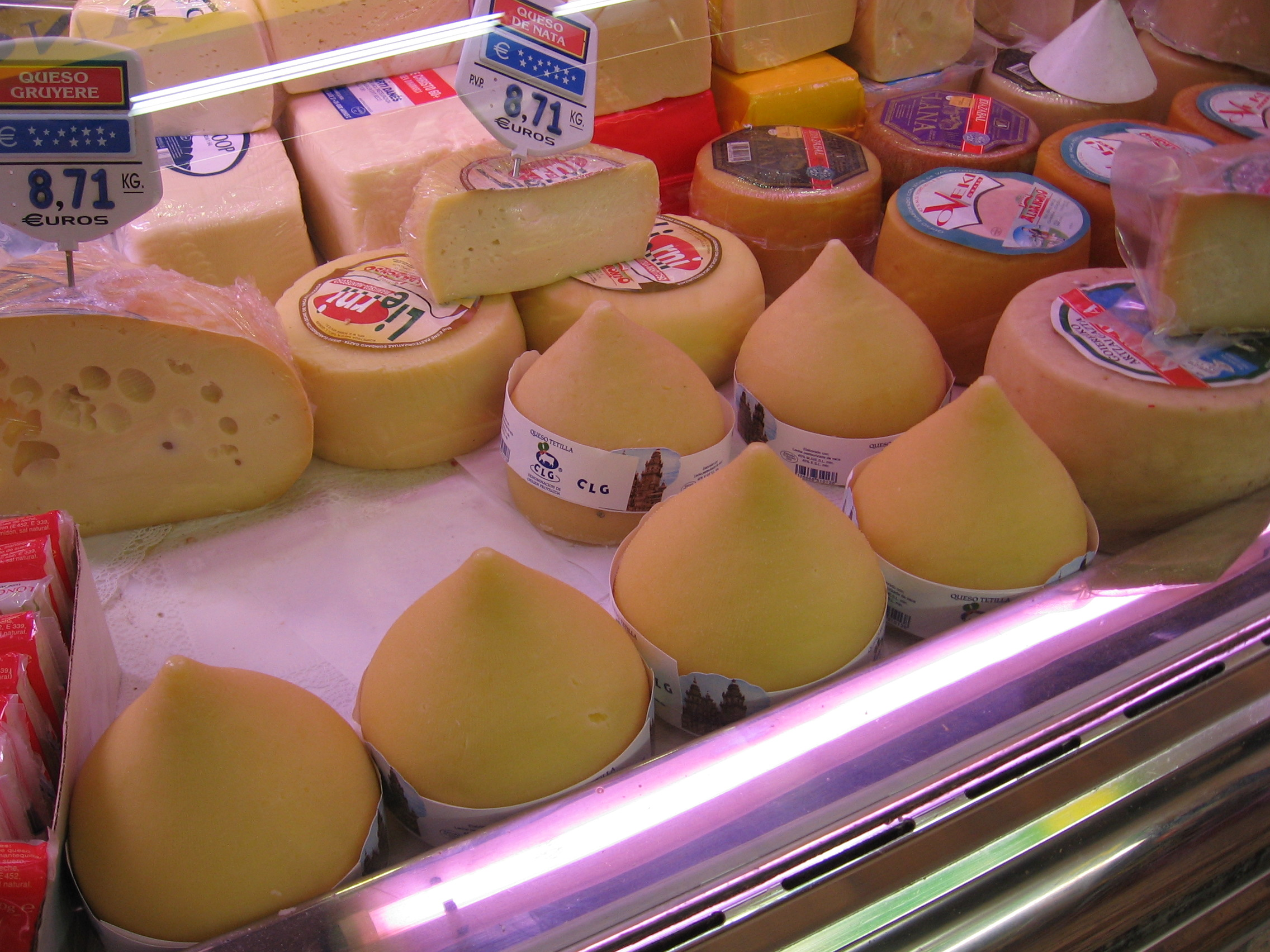
- Other names: Perilla, Queixo da Illana
- Country of origin: Spain
- Region: Galicia
- Source of milk: Cows' milk
- Pasteurised: Yes
- Texture: Soft, creamy
- Fat content: >50%
- Dimensions: 90 to 150 mm
- Weight: 0.5 to 1.5 kg (1.1 to 3.3 lb)
- Certification: DO 1993; DOP 1996

Tetilla, also known as Queso Tetilla, is a cow's-milk cheese produced in Galicia, Spain. It is traditionally molded into a peaked, conical form, which resembles a human breast. It is a common element in Galician cuisine, where it is often used as a dessert.

== Production ==
Tetilla is made in Galicia, in the northwestern corner of Spain. Galicia's proximity to the cool waters of the Atlantic creates an oceanic to sub-oceanic climate, which, combined with the region's rolling topography, allows for the existence of extensive pastures and meadows; these variables allow for an ideal environment for dairy farming.

By law, tetilla cheese may only be produced from the milk of Holstein, Swiss Brown, or Rubia Gallega cattle. The milk is fermented with Lactococcus lactis bacteria, and coagulated with animal rennet. The curd is pressed into tetilla's characteristic conical shape, after which the cheese is lightly salted in brine and aged for a minimum of 8 days.

As of 2016, around 2 million units of tetilla cheese are produced annually, with the majority of sales occurring within Spain.

== History ==
References to breast-shaped cheese can be found as early as the 1st century AD, in the writings of Pliny the Elder. However, the first specific mention of tetilla cheese comes from the second half of the 18th century.

Tetilla cheese has had Denominación de Origen certification since 1993 and European DOP certification since 1996.

== Characteristics ==
The name tetilla (Spanish for small breast; the word is also the official name in Galician) describes the shape of the cheese, which is conical and has a nipple-like peak on its top.

The cheese is pale yellow to ivory in color, and has a fine, thin rind, with a soft, creamy, uniform interior. Its flavor and aroma are described as buttery, lightly acidic, slightly salty, and reminiscent of the dairy from which the cheese was produced. It is traditionally served after dinner or as a dessert, but can be enjoyed in other dishes where a soft, meltable cheese is desired.
