= Denominación de origen =

Part of a regulatory geographical indication system used primarily for foodstuffs

In Spain and Latin America, the denominación de origen (Spanish: [denominaˈθjon de oˈɾixen]; lit. 'designation of origin') (Note: In other languages of Spain: Catalan: denominació d'origen (IPA: [dənuminəsiˈo ðuˈɾiʒən]).; Galician: denominación de orixen (IPA: [denominaˈθjon dɪ oˈɾiʃɪŋ]).; Basque: jatorrizko deitura (IPA: [jatoris̻ko deituɾa]).) is part of a regulatory geographical indication system used primarily for foodstuffs such as cheeses, condiments, honey, and meats, among others. In wines, it parallels the hierarchical systems of France (1935) and Italy (1963), although Rioja (1925) and Jerez (1933) preceded the full system. In foods, it performs a similar role, regulation of quality and geographical origin of products from Spain. There are five other designated categories solely for wine and a further three specifically covering food and condiments, all recognised by the European Union (EU). In Catalonia, two further categories – labelled A and Q – cover traditional Catalan artisan food products, but were not recognised by the EU as of 2007. In recent decades, the concept of the denominación de origen has been adopted by other countries, primarily in Latin America. In 2016, the use of the Denominación de Origen (DO) for wines was registered as a European Union Protected Designations of Origin/Denominación de Origen Protegida (PDO/DOP), but the traditional Portuguese term of DO can still be used legally on labels.

== Definition ==
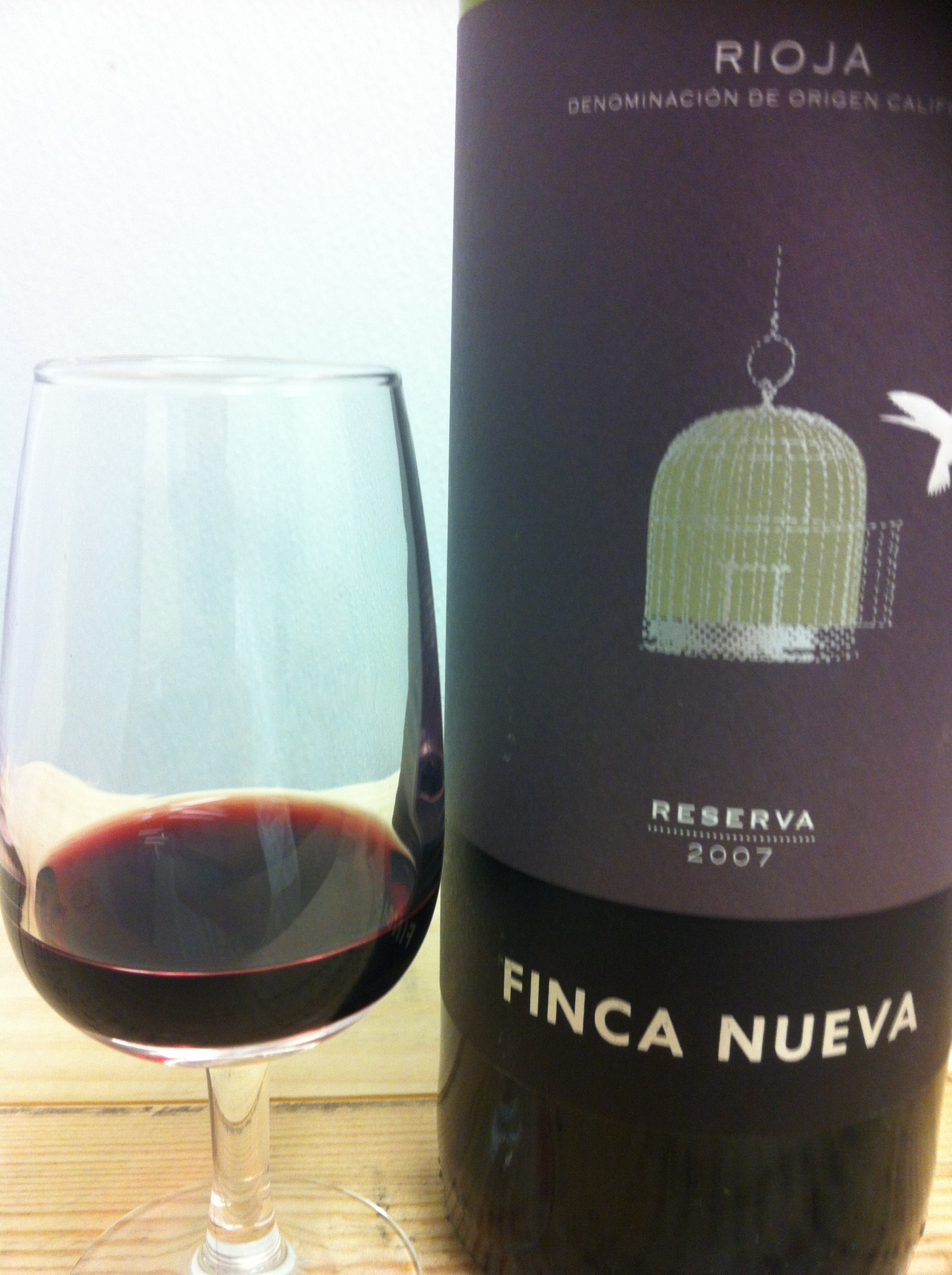
A Reserva level Rioja DOCa

The Spanish Ministry of Agriculture, Fisheries and Food regulates the quality of Spanish foodstuffs via a labelling system which establishes, among other things, a denominación de origen for the country's highest-quality produce. There is a semi-autonomous governing body (Consejo Regulador) for each region and for each food type, comprising skilled, impartial members who investigate the quality, ingredients and production process of each product, ensuring they attain specific quality levels. They report to a central council at national government level, but are normally based in the largest population centre of a given region and are responsible for ensuring labelling reflects geographical region. Products labelled denominación de origen, apart from being of superior quality, are expected to carry specific characteristics of geographical region or individual producer and be derived from raw materials originating within the region. Like most of these designations, a fundamental tenet of a DO label is that no product outside of that region is permitted to bear the name.

== History ==
Food and wine are inseparable from Spanish culture, historically bound to the social, economic, literary and even mystical fabric of society over thousands of years, so it is perhaps not surprising that attempts to regulate and normalise activities related to them have proven highly elusive. It was not until the seventeenth century, when legislative authorities became sufficiently interested in issues such as public health, public order and economic regulation, that laws began to be formulated with regard to wine, initially prohibiting, later encouraging and ultimately regulating its production, commercialisation and consumption. Food regulation waited even longer, until Spain's entry into the EU and signing up to the Common Agricultural Policy during the latter part of the twentieth century.

A series of Royal Decrees on wine were issued during the eighteenth and nineteenth centuries, focussing on ad hoc issues which arose due to new tendencies at home and abroad and often dealing more with maverick suppliers than any concern with comprehensive regulation. Gradually though, concern shifted from issues related to supply towards the need to regulate quality, especially for foreign markets. During the 1920s serious attempts were made to formulate some kind of classification along the lines of the French appellation system. Following the establishment of the Rioja as the first Spanish denominación in 1925, the Estatuto de vino ('wine statute') of 1932 coincided with national and international recognition of the sherry-producing region of Jerez.

Despite being thorough and wide-ranging, the Estatuto was quickly overwhelmed by technological advances in agriculture. By the time the EEC became influential in this area. it was clear that the law would require fundamental re-drafting. A new Estatuto, the Ley del Vino y de los Alcoholes (25/1970) came into place in December 1970 but was again undermined, this time by two important events: the new Spanish Constitution (inaugurated in 1978) that restated geographical considerations with the Estado de las Autonomías, and Spain's pending membership of the European Community (1986) that brought about a rapid classification of all Spanish produce in line with other member states.

Finally, in March 1996, the Spanish government unveiled its own multi-tier sub-classifications, consistent with EU regulation but more pertinent to Spanish agriculture. Hence, for example, the EU's Quality Wines Produced in Specified Regions (QWPSR) covers all Spanish wines graded above the basic vino de mesa ('table wine'). The Spanish denominación de origen forms a subset of the QWPSR. This has coincided with a rise in the perceived quality of Spanish produce generally and has been widely acclaimed, although some areas, like the super-strict denominación de pago, remain controversial and liable to future amendment.

== Product types ==
Denominaciones de origen status can be applied to a wide range of foods and condiments, specifically:

- Olive oil
- Rice
- Bread, cakes and pastries
- Cheese and butter
- Fresh meat
- Prepared meats and sausages
- Cured ham
- Fish, molluscs and crustaceans
- Vegetables
- Fruit
- Honey
- Condiments and spices
- Cider
- Wine
- Distilled alcoholic drinks

Quality foods may be designated a range of classifications, of which denominación de origen is the recognition of superior quality, with identifiable characteristics and specific ingredients, derived from an identifiable and verifiable source. Other classifications, not necessarily mutually exclusive, are as follows, under the general heading of alimentos de calidad diferenciada ('foods of distinguished quality'):

- Denominación de origen protegida (DOP, literally 'protected denomination of origin') – an EU designation of protected geographical status, referring to food products specific to a particular region or town and conveying a particular quality or characteristic of the designated area.
- Indicación geográfica protegida' (IGP, 'protected geographical indicator') – similar to DOP, but relating to a wider and less specific geographical region.
- Especialidades tradicionales Garantizadas (ETG, 'traditional specialty guaranteed') – products made using traditional ingredients, recipes or methods.
- Artisan food product stamp A – recognising small, family-run food businesses with high quality, distinctive produce overseen by a qualified artisan (Catalonia only, not recognised by the EU).
- Food quality stamp Q – foods with superior quality composition, production methods or presentation (Catalonia only, not recognised by the EU).
- Producción agricultura ecológica' (PAE, 'organic agricultural production' – an organic food designation recognising natural, environmentally friendly production methods.

By 2004, Spain had 250 denominaciones de origen and indicaciones geográficas protegidas, over half of which related to food. The following list of better-known denominaciónes de origen is by no means exhaustive:

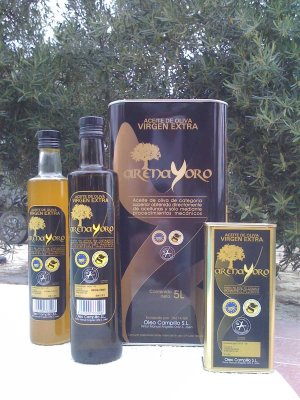
Olive oil DO Montes de Granada

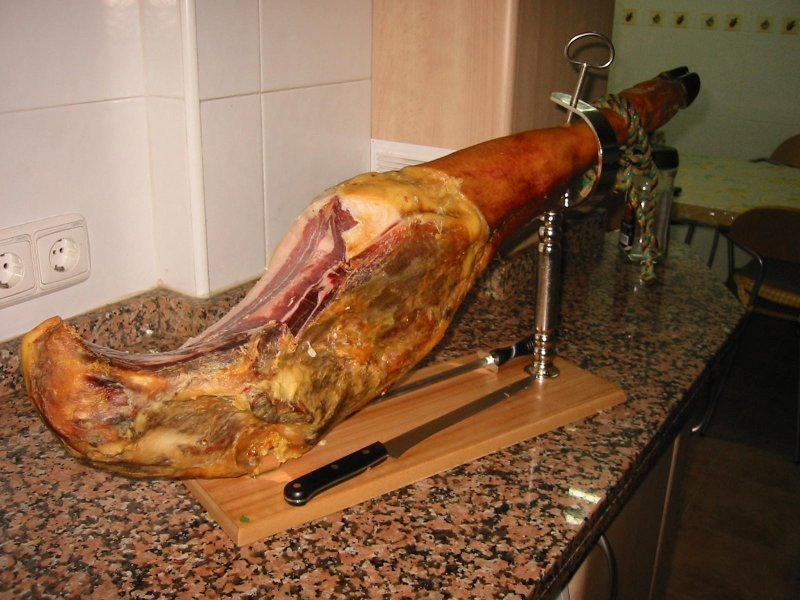
A leg of serrano ham on a jamonera

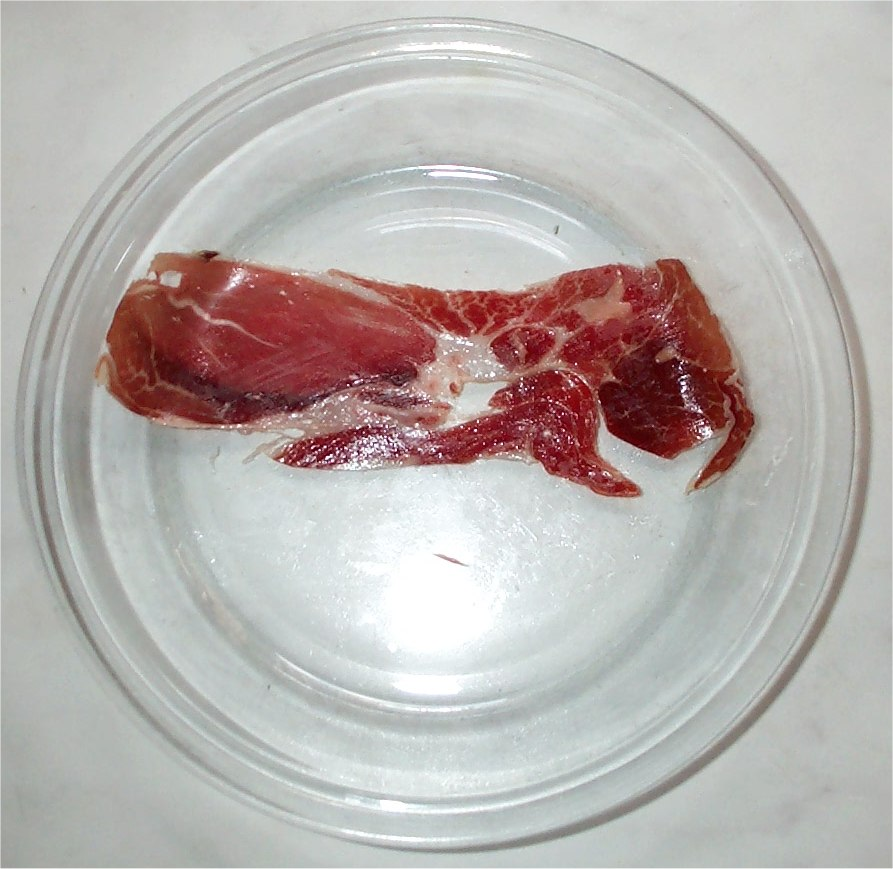
A slice of paleta ibérica

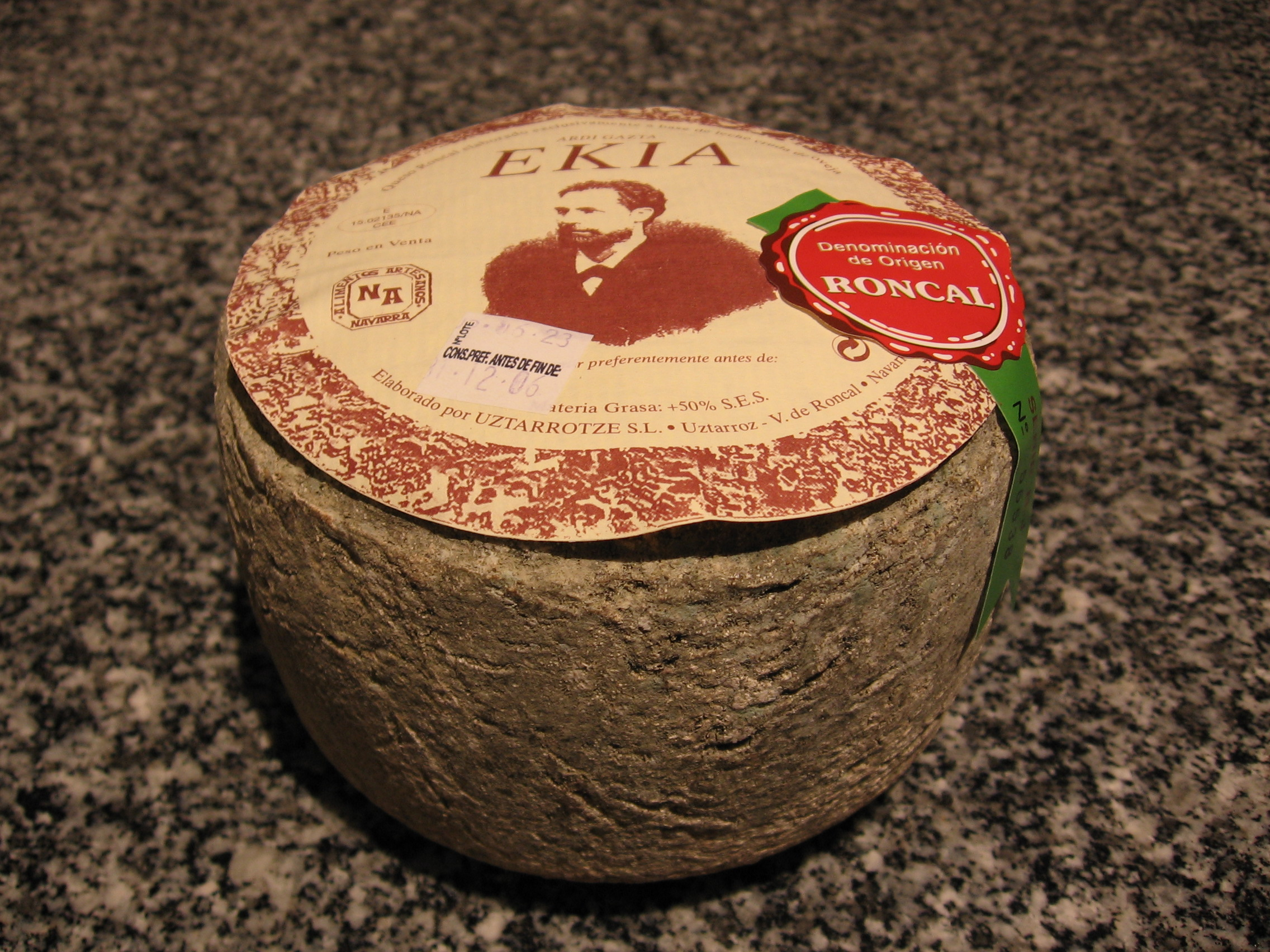
Roncal cheese with DO label

=== Olive oil ===
The denominaciones de origen for olive oil include:

- Aceite Monterrubio – from Badajoz in Extremadura, mostly Cornezuelo and Picual varieties.
- Baena – Hojiblanca, Picual and Lechín varieties from the south-east of the province of Cordoba.
- Les Garrigues – Arbequina and Verdiell varieties from the province of Lleida in Catalonia.
- Priego de Córdoba – Picado, Hojiblanca and Picual varieties from the province of Córdoba.
- Sierra Magina – Picual variety from the southern part of Jaén province.
- Sierra Segura – mostly Picual from the north-east of Jaén province.
- Siurana – Arbequina, Royal, and Murrot varieties from the province of Tarragona.

=== Iberian ham (jamón ibérico) ===
The famous jamón ibérico has several denominaciones de origen, including:

- Huelva – source of the jamón de Jabugo.
- Teruel
- Guijuelo – well known for jamón y paleta ibéricos de bellota (from acorn-fed pigs)
- Dehesa de Extremadura
- Los Pedroches

=== Cheese ===
- Tetilla unusually shaped cheese from Galicia.
- Cabrales – Asturian blue cheese.
- Picon Bejes-Tresviso – from Liébana region in the province of Cantabria.
- Liebana – from Cantabria, renowned for smoked cheeses.
- Cantabria – "fresh" Cantabrian cheese.
- Idiazábal – Basque cheese; the DO labels includes the cheese output of Alava, Biscay, Gipuzkoa, and Navarre.
- Roncal – from Navarre.
- Zamorano – from Zamora
- Manchego – from La Mancha.
- La Serena – sheep-milk cheese from Badajoz.
- Torta del Casar – sheep-milk cheese from Cáceres.
- Afuega'l pitu – cow-milk cheese from Asturias.

=== Vinegar ===
There are just four protected appellations for vinegar in the EU, of which three are in Spain:

- Vinagre de Jerez – sherry vinegar from Jerez
- Condado de Huelva – white wine vinegar from Huelva
- Montilla-Moriles

=== Wine ===
Wine region classification in Spain takes a quite complex hierarchical form in which the denominación de origen is a mainstream grading, equivalent to the French AOC and the Italian DOC. As of 2019, Spain has 138 identifiable wine regions under some form of geographical classification (2 DOCa/DOQ, 68 DO, 7 VC, 19 VP, and 42 VT). The Spanish DO is actually a subset of the EU-sponsored QWPSR (Quality Wine Produced in Specific Regions) regulatory code (vino de calidad producido en región determinada (VCPRD) in Spanish) which Spain formally adopted in 1986, upon accession to the (then) EEC. The Spanish appellation hierarchy was most recently updated in 2016, and is as follows:

DOP – denominación de origen protegida ('protected denomination of origin'), is the mainstay of Spain's wine quality control system. Each region is governed by a consejo regulador, which decides on the boundaries of the region, permitted varietals, maximum yields, limits of alcoholic strength and other quality standards or production limitations pertaining to the zone. As of 2019 there are 96 DOPs that are subdivided into DOCa, DO, VP, and VC. The sub-categories can be called DOP, or they can use the traditional terms of DOCa, DO, VP, and VC.

DOCa – denominación de origen calificada ('denomination of qualified origin'), is the highest category in Spanish wine regulations, reserved for regions with above-average grape prices and particularly stringent quality controls. Rioja was the first Spanish region to be awarded DOCa status in 1991, followed by Priorat in 2003. Priorat uses the Catalan language DOQ, for denominació d'origen qualificada. These are the only two regions considered "above" DO status.

DO – denominación de origen, the mainstay of Spain's wine quality control system. Each region is governed by a consejo regulador, which decides on the boundaries of the region, permitted varietals, maximum yields, limits of alcoholic strength and other quality standards or production limitations pertaining to the zone.

VP – vino de pago ('estate wine'), a special term for high-quality, single-estate wines (pago is a Spanish term for a vineyard estate) which in some cases also have DO or VC or IGP appellations. This category was formed in 2003.

VC – vino de Calidad con indicación geográfica ('quality wine with geographic indication'), a category formed in 2003 along with VP. The VC category is used for wines that do not fully meet the stringent standards of the DO category, but are above the standards of the IGP category.

IGP – indicación geográfica protegida (protected geographical indication (PGI)). This is part of the EU PGI scheme, which includes wines below the DOP level, and is wine originating from a specific place, a region or a country, which has a certain quality, reputation or other characteristic - including production phases - that can be essentially attributed to its geographical origin, at least one of which takes place in the defined geographical area. These can use the traditional term Vino de la Tierra (VT).

VdM – vino de mesa ('table wine'), the catch-all at the bottom of the pyramid, for all wine from unclassified vineyards, and wine that has been declassified by blending. This includes both inexpensive jug wines and some expensive wines that are not yet classified due to innovation outside traditional lines.

The two DOCa/DOQ regions are Priorat (Tarragona) and Rioja, the two highest-regarded wine-producing regions in Spain, which carry the special denominación de origen calificada.

The more prominent DO regions include:

- Campo de Borja (Zaragoza) – features a number of cooperatives that produce Garnacha and Tempranillo.
- Málaga and Sierras de Málaga (Málaga) – Sierras de Málaga is in effect a sub-appellation of the Málaga DO, traditionally known for its liquor wines and sweet wines.
- Montilla – Moriles (Córdoba) – produces mainly sweet dessert wines using similar techniques to those used for the production of sherry.
- Navarra (Navarre) – a neighbour of the Rioja, the Navarra DO region used to be renowned only for its rosado wines but in recent years has been producing quality reds and whites as well.
- Penedès (Barcelona) – notable not only for the production of the sparkling wine Cava, but red wines from Tempranillo, Garnacha, and Cariñena grapes.
- Rías Baixas (Galicia) – known for its Albarino varietals, Spain's most popular white wine. Other whites grown here include Treixadura, Loureira, Caino blanco, and Torrontes. Popular red grapes in this region include Caino Tinto and Sousón.
- Ribera del Duero (Castile and León) – challenges Rioja for the most popular red wines produced in Spain. Almost all of its wines are made from the Tempranillo grape.
- Rueda (Castile and León) – located west of Ribera del Duero, producing reds and whites, typically less expensive than those of its more famous neighbours.
- Jerez (Xérès) (Cádiz) – source of the English term "sherry", a fortified wine that can either be dry or sweet.
- Toro (Castile and León) – located between the provinces of Zamora and Valladolid, along the river Duero, producing reds such as Tinta de Toro, the local name for Tempranillo.

=== Sherry / Jerez ===
Along with the DO appellations, the Jerez-Xérès-Sherry DO of Spain uses the following categories:

- VOS – Latin: vinum optima signatum (and sometimes mistaken to stand for "very old sherry" by English speakers) – applies to sherries with an average age of at least 20 years.
- VORS - Vinum Optimu Rare Signatum, sometimes anglicized as Very Old Rare Sherry

== See also ==
- Traditional food
- Endemic gastronomy
- Appellation d'origine contrôlée, an analogous system in France
- Denominação de Origem Controlada, an analogous system in Portugal
- Denominazione di origine controllata, an analogous system for Italian wines
- List of Andalusian food and drink products with protected status
- Designation of Origin (film)
