= Bodegas Marqués de Murrieta =

Spanish winery

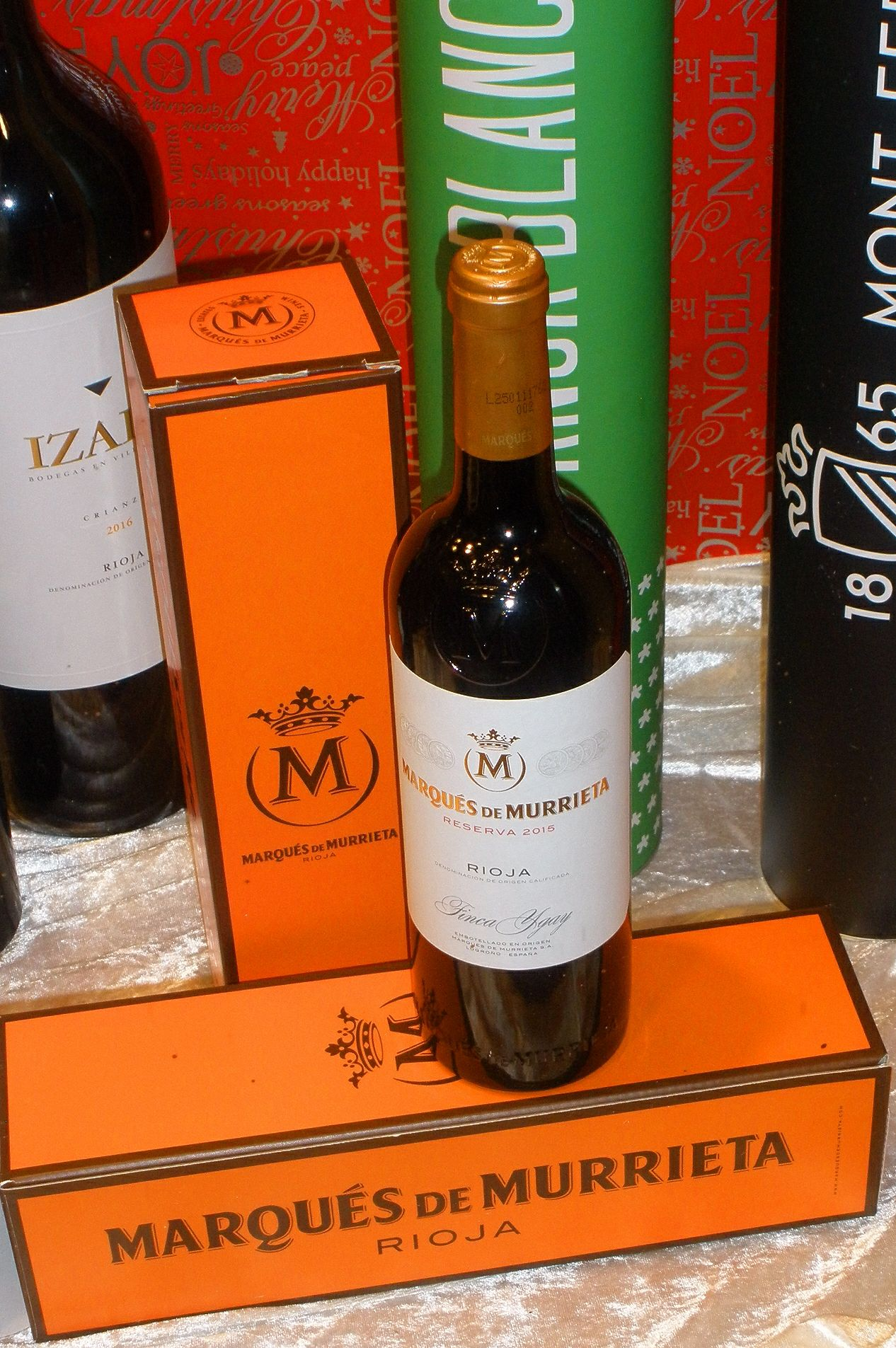
A bottle of Rioja Marqués de Murrieta with its characteristic orange case

Bodegas Marqués de Murrieta is a Spanish winery, located in the Rioja region, near Logroño. The winery was founded in 1852 by Peruvian-born Luciano de Murrieta y Garcia-Lemoine, 1st Marquess of Murrieta, and was the first Rioja estate to export its wines. In 1872, he purchased the Castillo Ygay estate, where the wines are produced today. The firm was purchased in 1983 by Vicente Cebrián Sagarriga, and since his death has been run by his son, Vicente Dalmau Cebrián. The chief winemaker is María Vargas.

Jancis Robinson has described Marqués de Murrieta as belonging to "the Rioja aristocracy", along with La Rioja Alta, CVNE, López de Heredia, Muga and Marqués de Riscal. Karen MacNeil described it as "one of the oldest and most prestigious bodegas in Rioja".

The estate's most well-known wine is its Castillo Ygay Gran Reserva Especial, but it is also known as one of the few Rioja producers to still make traditional oak-aged white wines. Its "Dalmau" Reserva release contains a proportion of Cabernet Sauvignon and is aged in French barriques.

== See also ==
- Marquess of Murrieta (title)
- Bodegas Marqués de Riscal
