= Muga =

Muga or MUGA may refer to:

- Assam silk
- Bodegas Muga, a Rioja winery
- MUGA scan
- Muga, Nepal, village
- Muga (river), Spain
- Muga River (Ethiopia)
- Multi-use games area
- MUGA World Pro Wrestling
