= Marquess of Riscal =

Marquessate of Riscal
- Creation date: 27 April 1708
- Created by: Philip V
- Peerage: Peerage of Spain
- First holder: Baltasar Hurtado de Amézaga y Unzaga, 1st Marquess of Riscal
- Present holder: María Belén Hurtado de Amézaga y Armada, 8th Marchioness of Riscal

Marquess of Riscal (Spanish: Marqués del Riscal) is a hereditary title in the peerage of Spain accompanied by the dignity of Grandee of Spain, bestowed on Baltasar Hurtado de Amézaga, lieutenant general governor of Málaga, distinguished in Spanish Flanders, by King Philip V on 27 April 1708.

The title lends its name to the renowned winery Herederos del Marqués de Riscal, S.A., located in Elciego since being established by the 6th marquess there in the 19th century.

== Marquesses of Riscal (1708) ==
- Baltasar Hurtado de Amézaga y Unzaga, 1st Marquess of Riscal (1657–1720)
- Unknown, 2nd Marquess of Riscal
- María Teresa Amézaga y Llamas, 3rd Marchioness of Riscal (d. 1779)
- Carlo Scotti di Vigoleno y Hurtado de Amézaga, 4th Marquess of Riscal (d. 1803)
- Guillermo Hurtado de Amézaga y Zubía, 5th Marquess of Riscal (1794-1878)
- Camilo Hurtado de Amézaga y Zubía, 6th Marquess of Riscal (1827-1888)
- José Hurtado de Amézaga y Zavala, 7th Marquess of Riscal (1867-1955)
- María Belén Hurtado de Amézaga y Armada, 8th Marchioness of Riscal

== See also ==
- List of current grandees of Spain
