= Bodegas Marqués de Riscal =

Spanish winery

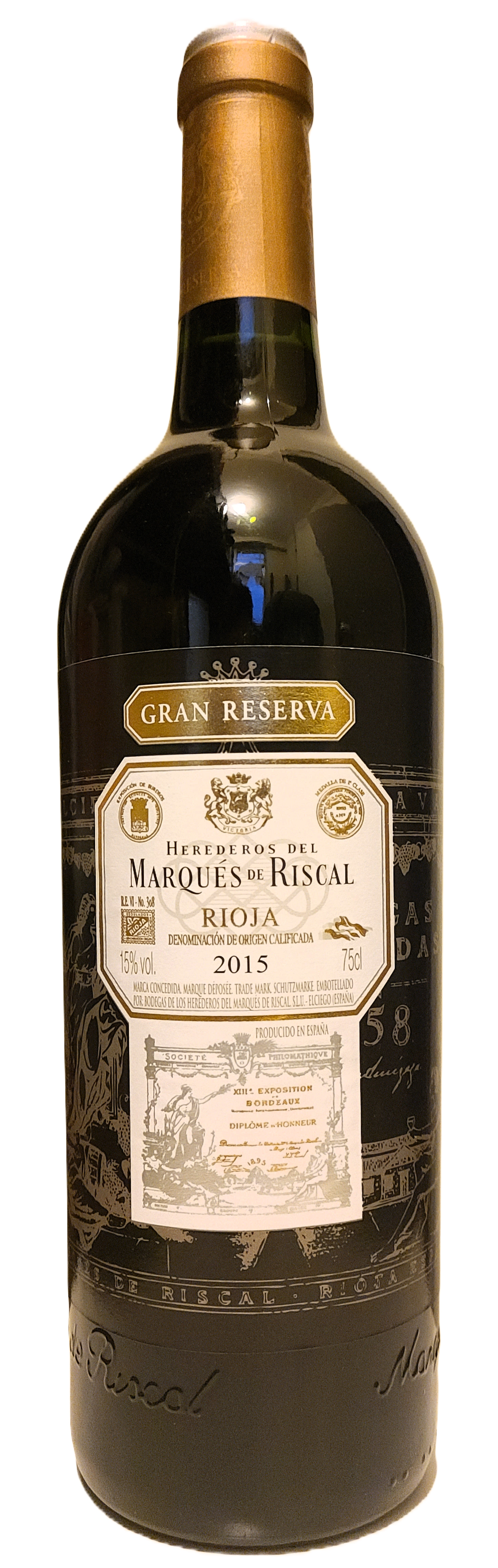
Gran Reserva 2015

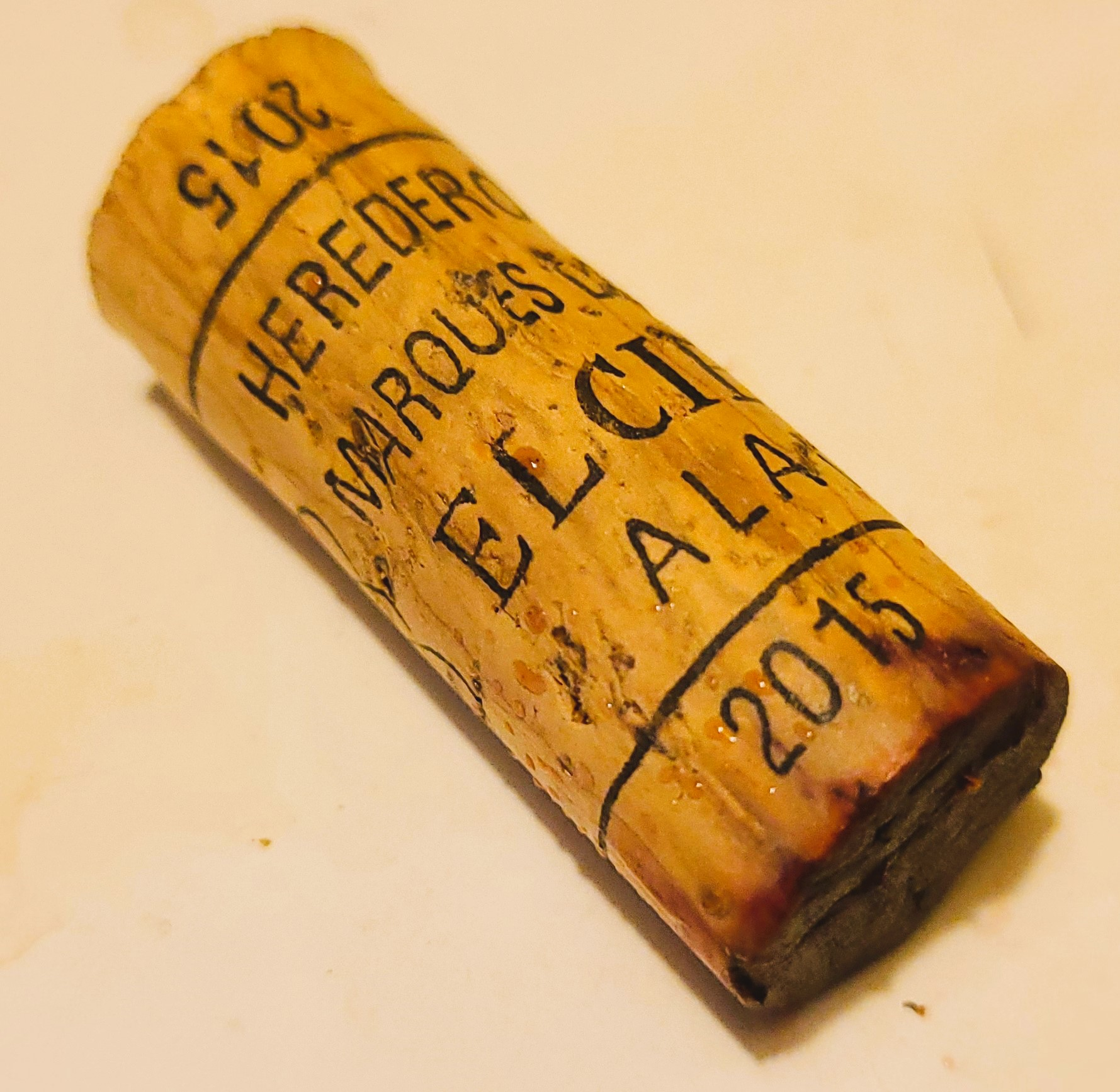
Cork of Gran Reserva

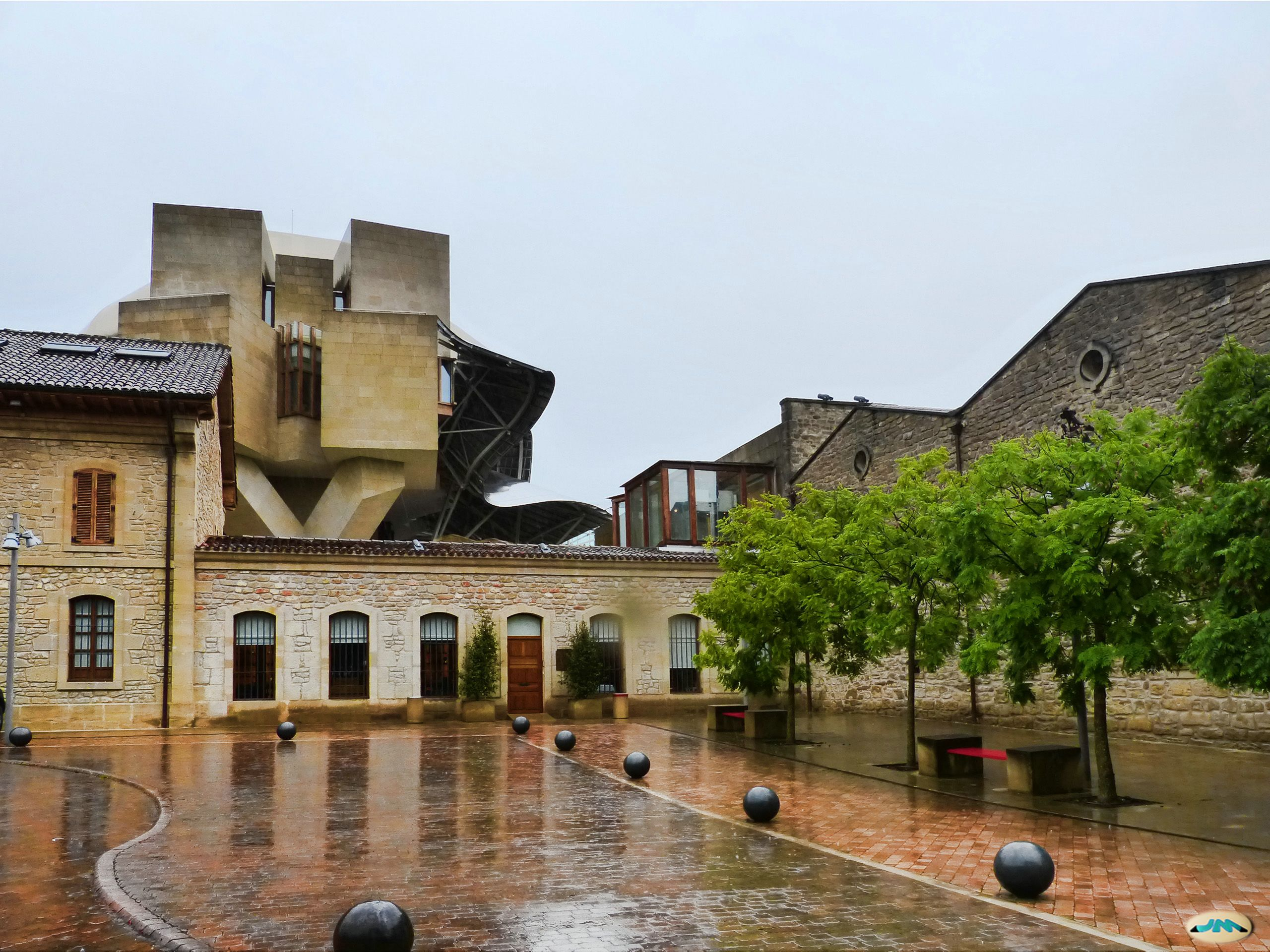
Partial view of the old winery and western wing of the hotel

Herederos del Marqués de Riscal, S.A., better known as Marqués de Riscal is a large Spanish winery located in Elciego, in the Rioja Alavesa.

The company was founded by Camilo Hurtado de Amézaga, 6th Marquess of Riscal in 1858 after inheriting a series of wineries in Elciego from his father.

In 2006 the Elciego wineries were transformed into the City of Wine, a complex that includes the primary wineries, the most modern ones, the vineyards and a leisure complex that includes the Marqués de Riscal Hotel, an emblematic building designed by the architect Frank Gehry and inaugurated by Juan Carlos I in 2003.

Since its origin in the 19th century, Marqués de Riscal has produced Rioja wine, but in 1972 it also settled in Rueda to produce white wine that in 1980 would receive the designation of origin of Rueda wine. Riscal was the first non-French wine to receive a Honorific Diploma at the International Wine Exposition of Bordeaux, in 1895.

== History ==
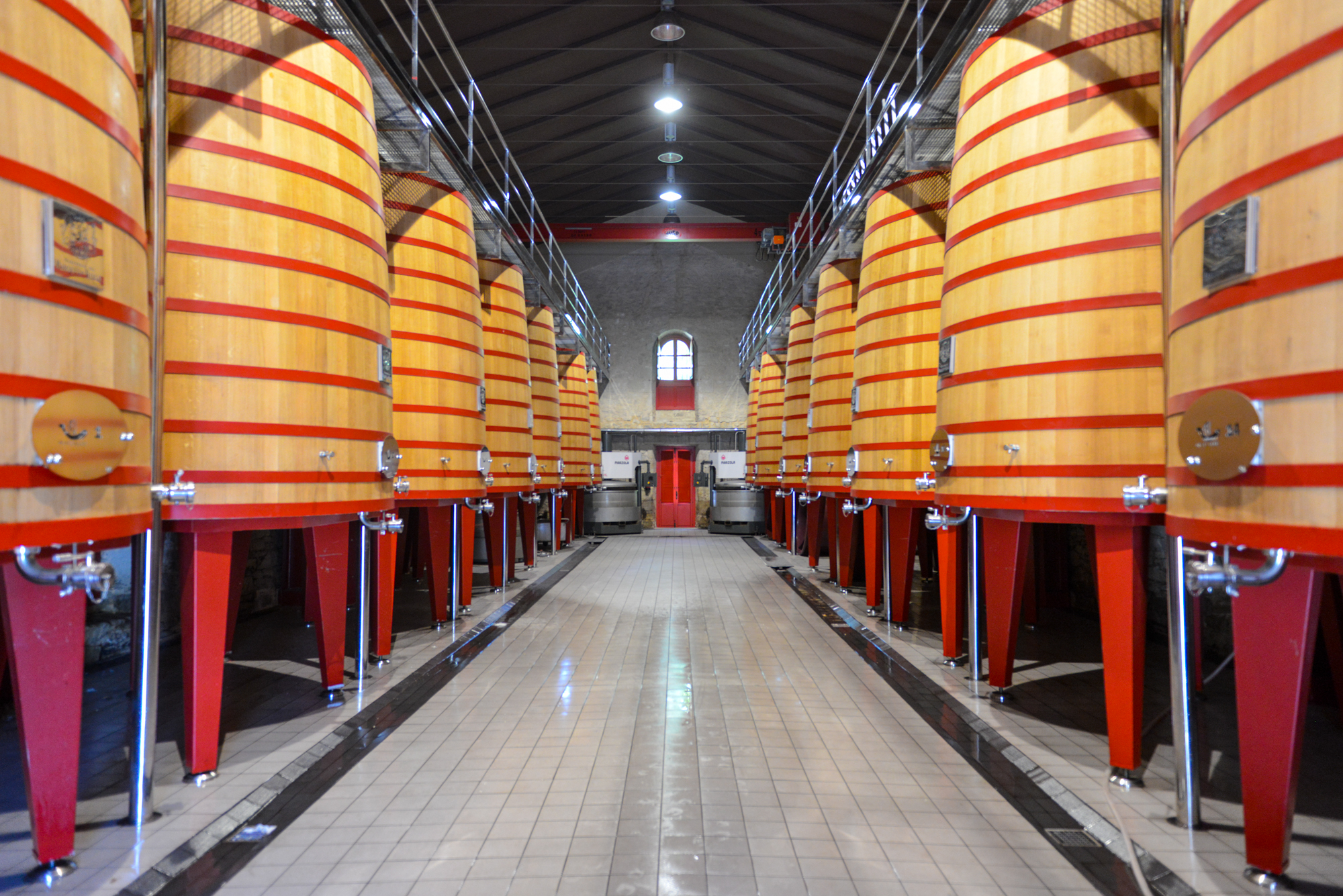
Barrels at one of the processing facilities

The company owes its name to the eponymous hereditary peerage title, which had been granted by Philip V of Spain to Baltasar Hurtado de Amézaga, a lieutenant general that was governor of Málaga and was distinguished in service in Spanish Flanders and in the Battle of Zenta.

It was Camilo Hurtado de Amézaga, 6th Marquess of Riscal, who was the driving force behind the creation of the wineries that bear the name of "Herederos del Marqués de Riscal" (Heirs of the Marquess of Riscal). He was residing in Bordeaux when he received the order from the Provincial Council of Álava to hire an oenologist who could teach the region's growers the techniques used in the Médoc, to produce wines according to the French system. The chosen expert was Jean Pineau, cellar master of the Château Lanessan cellars, with whom he signed, representing the Provincial Council, a contract to advise Álava producers. Hurtado then sent "9,000 fully guaranteed vine shoots" to the Rioja Alavesa, of the following types: Cabernet Sauvignon, Merlot, Malbec and Pinot noir, to experiment in their vineyards, where grapes had been grown of the Tempranillo and Graciano varieties.

In 1858 Hurtado, who had inherited some wineries in Elciego from his father, founded the wineries applying the techniques used in France, and hired Pineau full-time, who had stopped working for the deputation. In the 1895 edition of the International Exposition of Bordeaux, Marqués de Riscal became the first non-French winery to receive the Diploma of Honor.

== Production ==
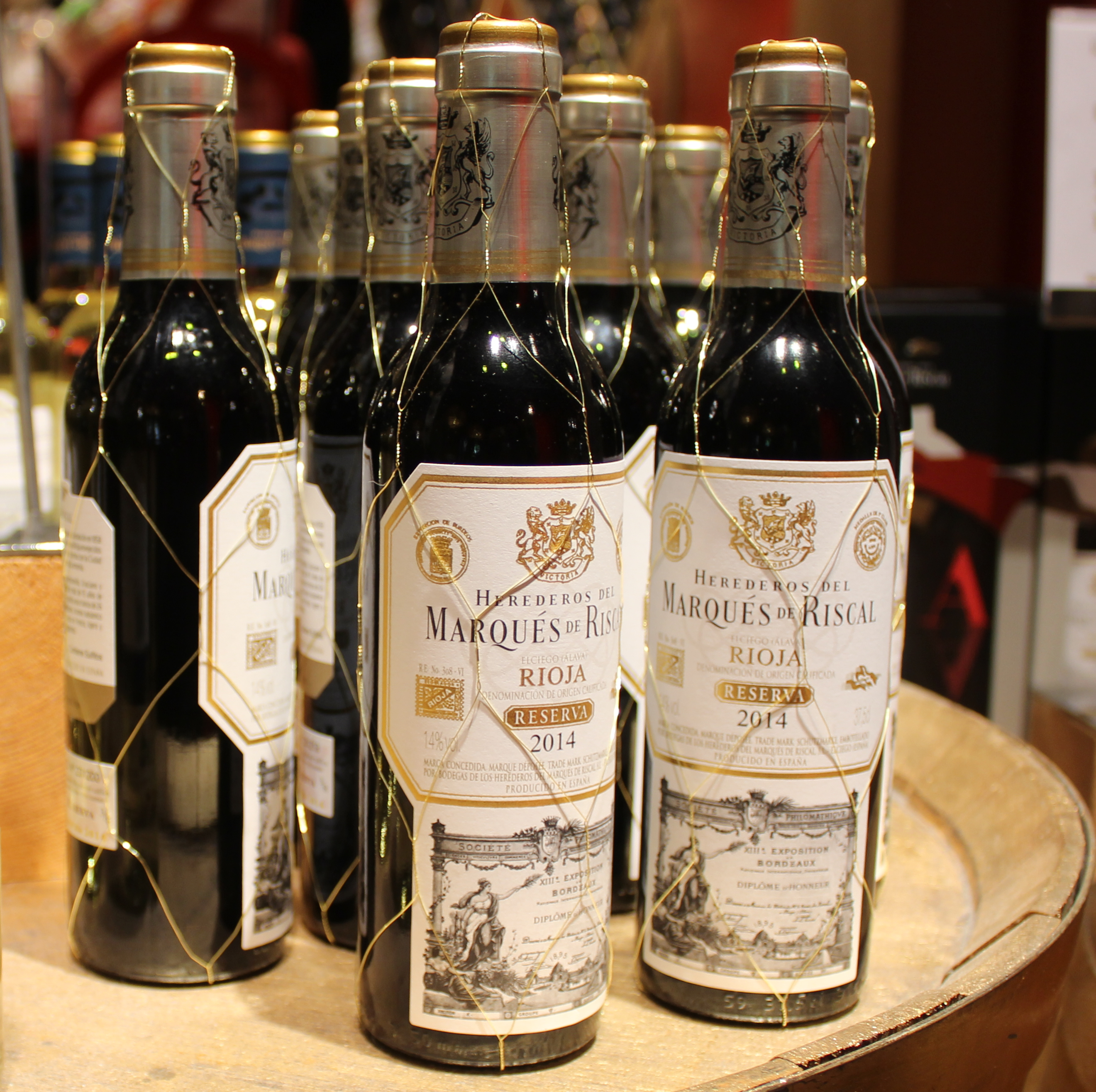
Small bottles of Rioja "Reserva 2014"

In 2021, the company had revenues of €72m, employed 310 people and exported to over 110 countries around the world. It puts on the market more than 7 million bottles of red and white wine, in addition to 200,000 of Laurent-Perrier sparkling wine.

Within the Rioja designation of origin, Marqués de Riscal sells red wine with the labels Frank Gehry Selection 2001, Barón de Chirel, Marqués de Riscal 150 Anniversary, Marqués de Riscal Gran Reserva, Finca Torrea, Marqués de Riscal Reserva, Marqués de Riscal Rosado and Marqués de Arienzo.

The white wine of the Rueda designation of origin is made up of the brands Marqués de Riscal Limousin, Finca Montico, Marqués de Riscal Sauvignon Blanc and Marqués de Riscal Rueda Verdejo.

Additionally, within the Vinos de la Tierra de Castilla y León denomination, it markets Riscal 1860, the only red wine it produces outside of La Rioja.

== See also ==
- Marquess of Riscal (title)
- Bodegas Marqués de Murrieta
