= Marquess of Murrieta =

Title in the peerage of Spain

Marquessate of Murrieta
- Creation date: 20 Octubre 1872
- Created by: Amadeo I
- Peerage: Peerage of Spain
- First holder: Luciano Murrieta y Ortiz, 1st Marquess of Murrieta
- Present holder: Cristina Serra y de Olivares, 6th Marchioness of Murrieta

Marquess of Murrieta (Spanish: Marqués de Murrieta) is a hereditary title in the peerage of Spain, bestowed on Luciano Murrieta, a Peruvian-born military officer and viticulturist, by King Amadeo I on 20 October 1872.

The 1st Marquess was the founder of the eponymous winery, located near Logroño and established in 1852.

== Marquesses of Murrieta (1872) ==
- Luciano Murrieta y Ortiz, 1st Marquess of Murrieta (1822–1911)
- José Manuel de Olivares y Bruguera, 2nd Marquess of Murrieta (d. 1937)
- Julián de Olivares y Bruguera, 3rd Marquess of Murrieta (1895–1977)
- Luis de Olivares y Bruguera, 4th Marquess of Murrieta (d. 1982)
- María Cristina de Olivares y Gómez-Barzanallana, 5th Marchioness of Murrieta (1936–2014)
- Cristina Serra y de Olivares, 6th Marchioness of Murrieta (b. 1965)

== See also ==
- Bodegas Marqués de Murrieta
