= Marqués de Riscal Hotel =

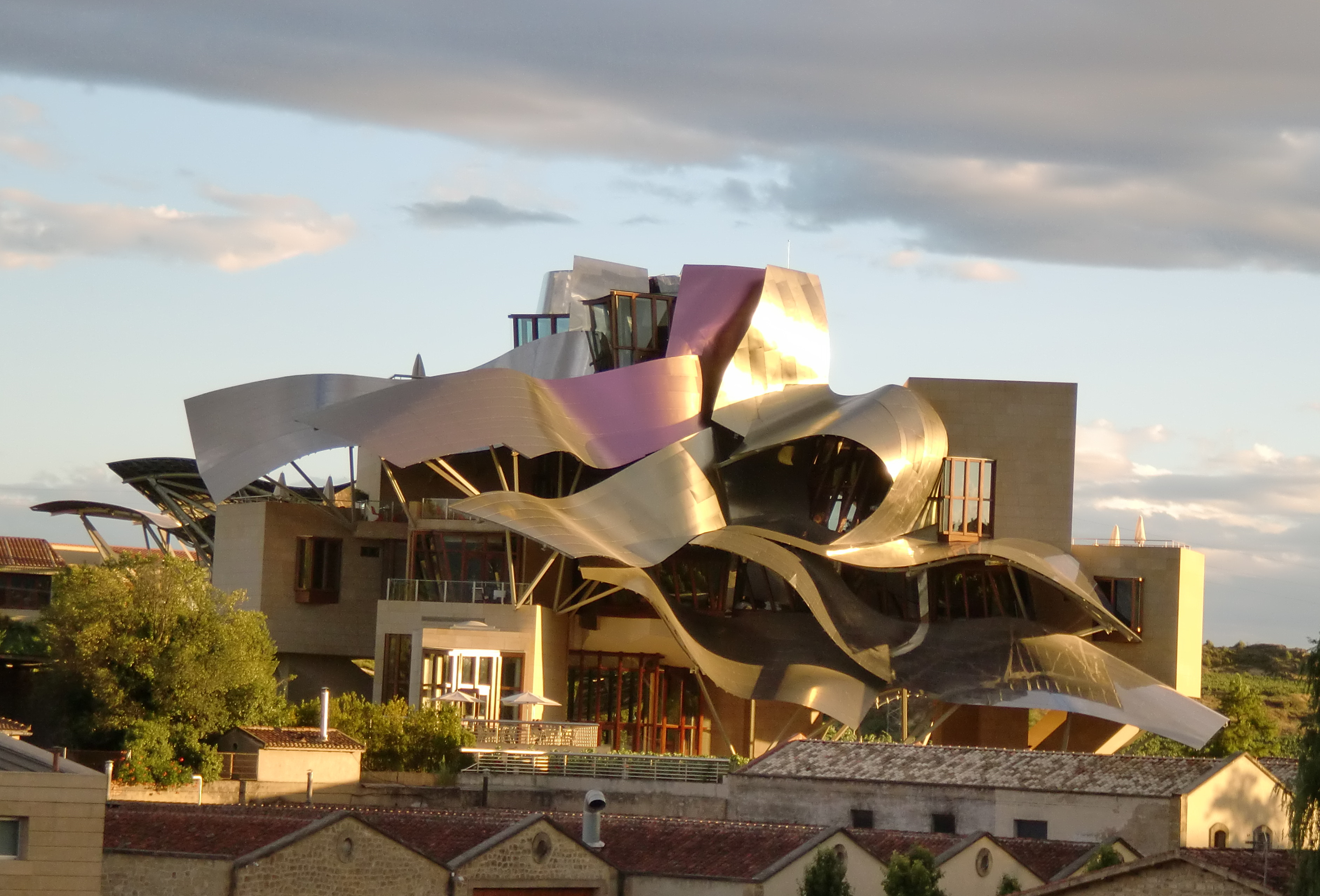
- Interactive map of the Marqués de Riscal Hotel area
- Alternative names: Marqués de Riscal Vineyard Hotel
- Hotel chain: The Luxury Collection

General information
- Status: Completed
- Type: Hotel
- Location: Torrea, 1, 01340, Elciego, Rioja Alavesa, Spain
- Coordinates: 42.51161°N 2.61801°W
- Construction started: May 2003
- Completed: 2006

Height
- Height: 25 m (82 ft)

Technical details
- Floor count: 4
- Floor area: 3,200 m^{2} (34,000 sq ft)

Design and construction
- Architect: Frank Gehry

Other information
- Number of rooms: 43
- Number of restaurants: 3

The Marqués de Riscal Hotel, also known as the Marqués de Riscal Vineyard Hotel, is a luxury hotel located in the wineries of Bodegas Marqués de Riscal, Elciego, Spain. It is part of The Luxury Collection. The hotel was designed by Frank Gehry using methods previously employed in the Guggenheim Museum Bilbao. It was built by Ferrovial.

== See also ==
- List of works by Frank Gehry
