= Eustaquio Echave-Sustaeta Pedroso =

Spanish writer and politician (1872–1952)

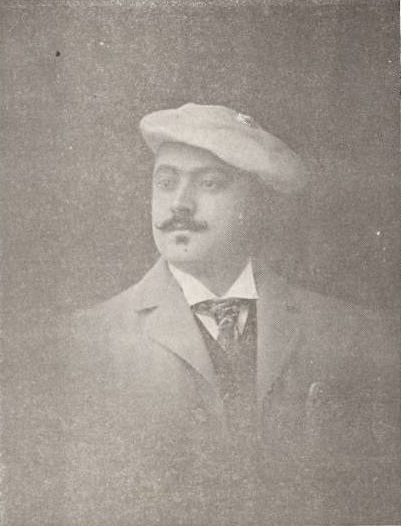
- Born: Eustaquio Echave Sustaeta Pedroso; 1872; Haro, Spain
- Died: 1952 (aged 79–80); Elciego, Spain
- Occupations: publisher, lawyer
- Known for: publisher
- Political party: Carlism

Eustaquio Echave-Sustaeta Pedroso (1872–1952) was a Spanish Carlist publisher and politician. He was related to numerous periodicals, but is known mostly as manager and editor-in-chief of the local Pamplonese daily, El Pensamiento Navarro (1897–1917). His career in party ranks climaxed in the early 1930s, when very briefly he held the Carlist provincial jefatura in Álava. The apogee of his political trajectory fell on early period of the Civil War, when he was president of the Alavese Diputación Provincial (1936–1938) and leader of Falange Española Tradicionalista in Álava (1937). At times he is also acknowledged as a polemist of Sabino Arana (mid-1890s), who inadvertently helped the latter to refine his theory of Basque nationalism, and as a point of reference for the Carlist position towards fueros.

== Family and youth ==
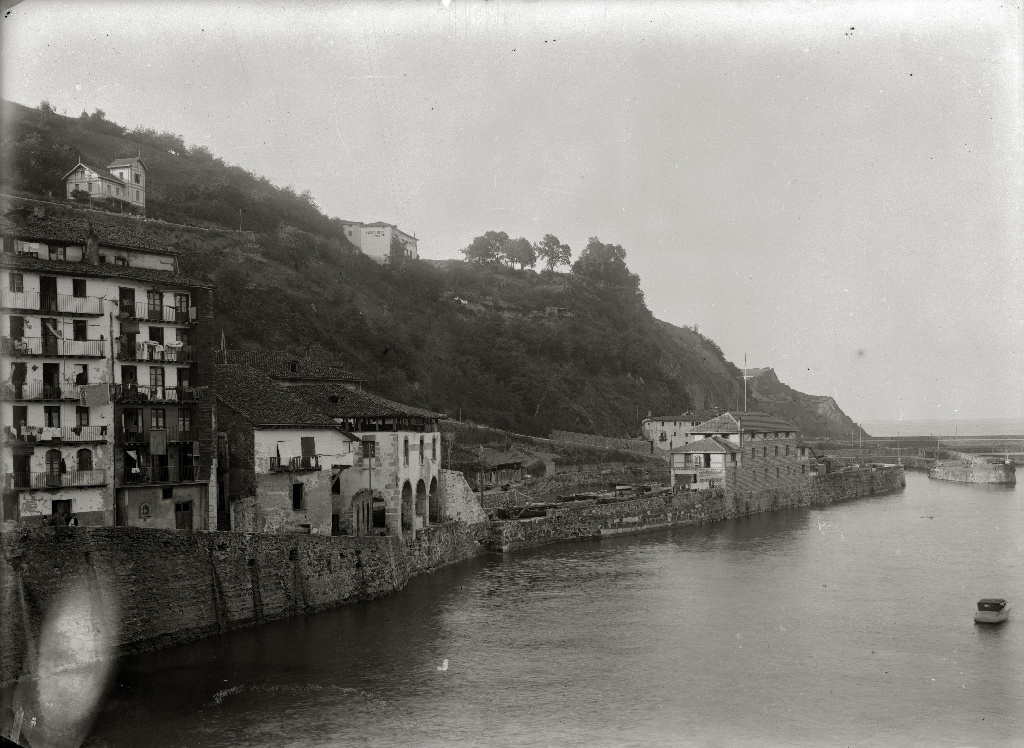
Motrico

The surnames of Echave and Sustaeta appeared in history of Gipúzkoa already in the medieval era, but it is unclear when and in what circumstances they were merged into a composite one. The first bearer of the Echave Sustaeta surname identified was Eustaquio's paternal grandfather, Antonio Francisco Echave Sustaeta. In the 1840s and 1850s he was secretario del ayuntamiento and tesorero de la caja de caminos - mid-range local administrative jobs - in the Gipuzkoan coastal town of Motrico; there is little more known of him. His son Eustaquio Echave Sustaeta Gaviola (died 1891) was also born in Motrico. In 1857 he married Segunda Pedroso Corral (1835–1909) from Elciego in Álava. The couple moved following juridical career of Echave Sustaeta: in the 1860s he was promotor fiscal del Juzgado de Hacienda in Logroño, in the 1870s juez de primera instancia in Haro and then in the early 1880s in Tolosa. In the mid-1880s he settled in Zaragoza, where he retired still as juez de primera instancia.

The couple had at least 5 children, born between the late 1850s and the mid-1870s: daughters Gregoria, Regina, and Soledad, and sons Eustaquio and Antonio. There is nothing known about the childhood years of Eustaquio. According to some sources he spent his early years in Elciego, with the maternal family, though at some stage he joined his father in Zaragoza; it is unclear whether he received secondary education in the Aragonese capital. Some time in the very late 1880s he enrolled in the law faculty at the University of Zaragoza, where he pursued academic career with Juan Moneva y Puyol. Already during his university spell he demonstrated interest in letters, and especially in journalism; following graduation in 1894 he did not launch a career in law, but moved to Bilbao to assume the post of editor-in-chief of the newly set up periodical of the Carlist youth, Chapel-Zuri.

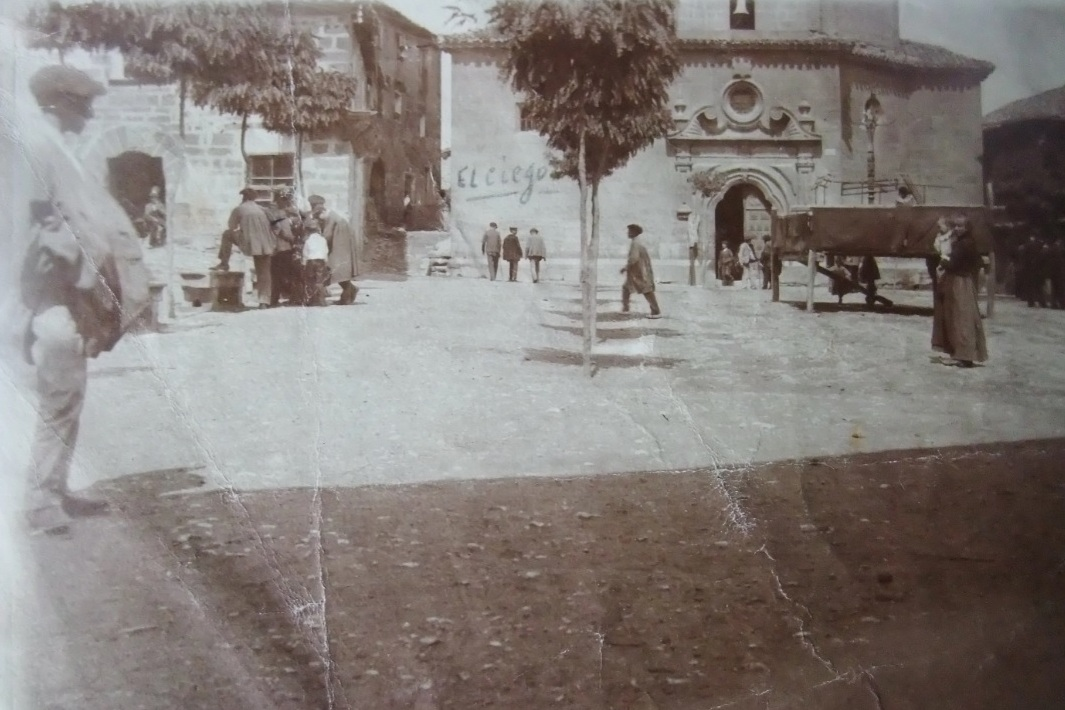
Elciego, early 20th. c.

In 1902 Echave-Sustaeta married Victoria Sáenz de Navarrete Ramírez (1874-1948), also from Elciego. She came from a locally distinguished family; her father León Sáenz de Navarrete Ramirez de la Piscina counted among the richest and largest landowners in the area, engaged in the wine-growing business. The couple later inherited some real estate in Elciego, where Echave-Sustaeta would spend last decades of his life. They had no offspring; as was customary for childless well-off couples, they later served as padrinos to many local children. The best-known Echave-Sustaeta's relative was his younger brother Antonio, in 1907-1924 member of the Alavese Diputación Provincial, in 1961-1964 member of the FET executive and deputy to the Cortes. His older son and Eustaquio's nephew, José Blas Echave-Sustaeta Peciña, during late Francoism grew to General Inspector del Cuerpo de Intervención, while the younger one Javier Echave-Sustaeta Peciña became a nationwide known scholar in Latin. In turn his son, José Javier Echave-Sustaeta del Villar, is a moderately known Catholic author and activist.

== Early public activity (before 1897) ==
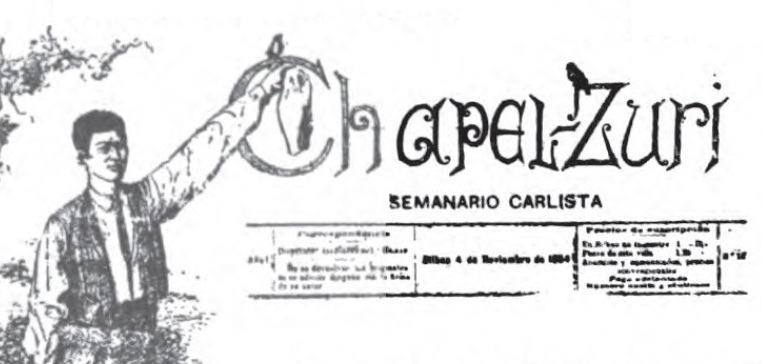
Chapel-Zuri

There is little known about political preferences of Echave-Sustaeta's ancestors. His grandfather was a vehement supporter of separate Basque establishments, and in the mid-19th century in open letters he protested against "anexion de este país á una nación extranjera", which might or might have not translated into Carlism. However, some claim that Echave-Sustaeta was "carlista de abolengo", implying that he inherited Carlist ideas from his forefathers. Already during his academic period he was a zealous adherent to the movement; in 1891 (according to some sources in 1892) in Zaragoza he co-launched a weekly El Aragonés, the only Carlist periodical in the city, discontinued when its editors completed university studies and left Zaragoza. His first identified contribution to the national Carlist mouthpiece, El Correo Español, is dated 1893; at the time in the official party structures he held the post of vicesecretario of Junta Provincial.

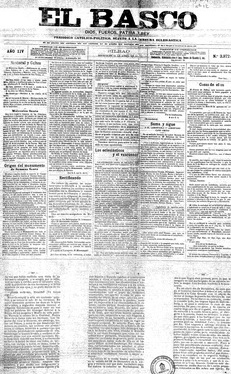
El Basco

In 1894, having moved to Bilbao, Echave-Sustaeta engaged in the local weekly Chapel-Zuri (eng. white beret); according to himself and most of the sources, he acted as both editor-in-chief and as manager, though according to other sources the overall management was at least during some time with Enrique de Olea. The periodical either was or became the mouthpiece of Juventud Carlista, the youth branch of the Biscay Traditionalism. In the mid-1890s Echave-Sustaeta co-founded the organisation; it counted some 200 members. He led some of its public rallies and grew to its president; in 1897 he was also president of Círculo Tradicionalista de San Jaime in Bilbao.

Apart from Chapel-Zuri, in the mid-1890s Echave-Sustaeta was related to some other periodicals, especially the Bilbao daily El Basco, owned by the Carlist politician Celestino Alcocer. He kept sending correspondence to El Correo Español, first from Zaragoza and then from Bilbao. For some time he appeared briefly related to an ephemerical Carlist periodical from Vitoria, El Alavés, and to a short-lived weekly from Logroño, La Lealtad Riojana. His best-known articles of the time are these published in Chapel-Zuri and El Basco; they are related to increasingly bitter polemics with ideologue of the nascent Basque nationalism, Sabino Arana. Technically the polemics was about traditional separate legislative regulations, named fueros, but in fact it was related to understanding of the Basque identity; Arana formulated it in racist and anti-Spanish terms, Echave-Sustaeta understood it as own separate self within the Spanish cultural and political framework. Echave-Sustaeta's stand earned him personal congratulations on part of the claimant and recognition far beyond Vascongadas, e.g. in Valencia. However, it is rather the pamphlet written in response by Arana which made it to history books.

== El Pensamiento Navarro (1897–1917) ==
Carlist standard

In the 1890s the key Carlist daily in Navarre was the Pamplona-based La Lealtad Navarra, issued since 1888 as continuation of the Integrist-seized El Tradicionalista. However, for reasons which are not clear, the newspaper was discontinued and its last issue appeared in July 1897. Its replacement – some scholars say merely a renamed continuation - was to be the newly founded El Pensamiento Navarro, also based in Pamplona and controlled by Junta Regional. Echave-Sustaeta was hired as its director, which at the time stood for the role of manager and editor-in-chief combined. He moved to the Navarrese capital; the first issue appeared on the market in October 1897. It turned out that he would remain at the helm of the daily for 20 years, and in its 84-year lifetime he was – after Francisco López Sanz – its manager of the second-longest tenure.

Under Echave-Sustaeta's guidance El Pensamiento Navarro emerged as a vehemently Carlist newspaper; it was intended for a possibly broad audience and prioritized news and short articles over doctrinal and ideological dissertations. In the early 20th it was selling in some 1,800 copies, a rather good result for a city of 30,000 inhabitants, though falling far behind 3,000 of the conservative competitor, El Eco de Navarra. The latter closed in 1903, but its readers were taken over by a newly founded Maurista daily, Diario de Navarra. El Pensamiento stood out due to its combative and intransigent style; in 1900 it cost Echave-Sustaeta detention, related also to general anxiety about another Carlist insurgency forthcoming, and in 1901 a hefty fine, reduced in course of the appeal process.

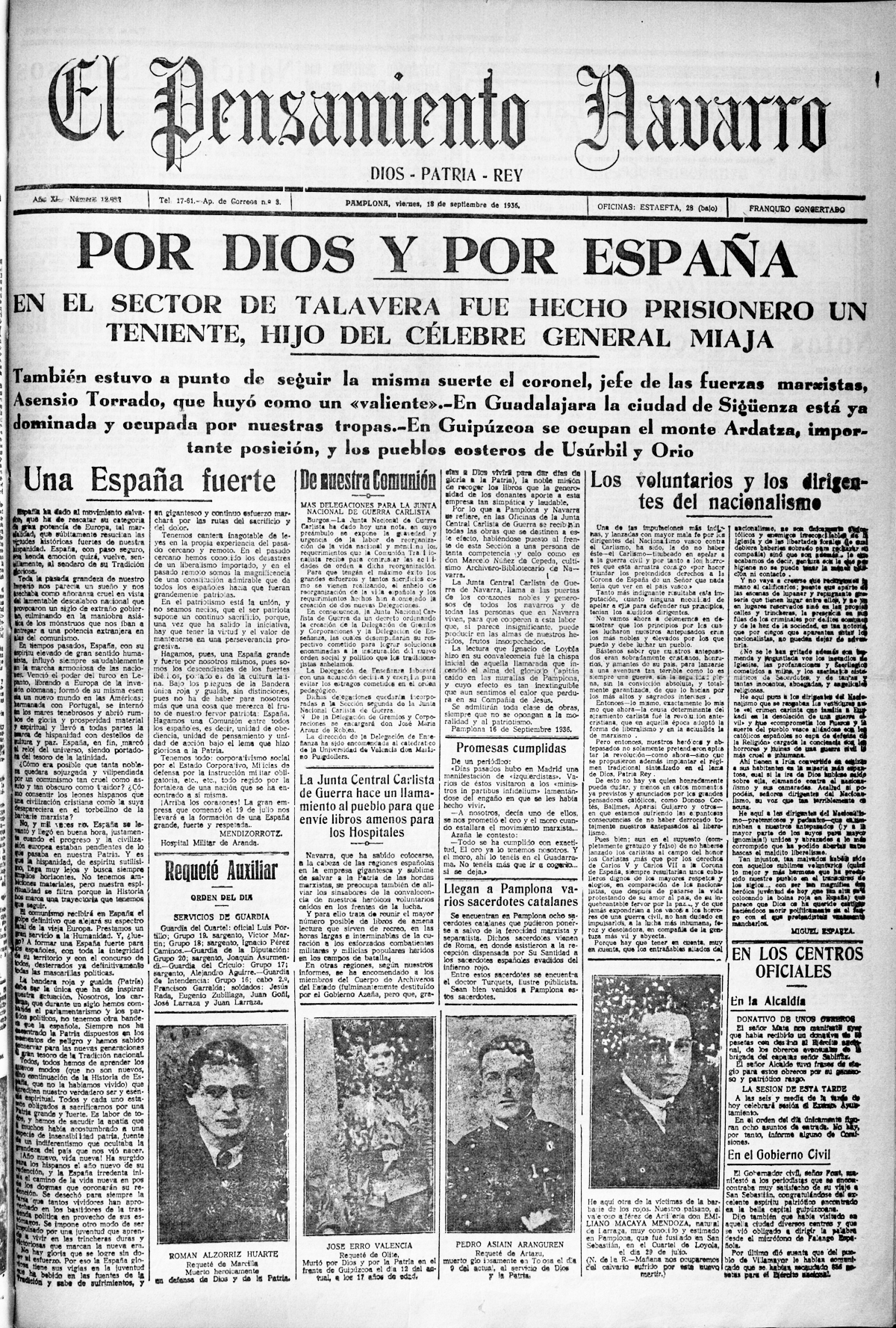
El Pensamiento Navarro (later issue)

During initial phase of his press career he used to sign as "E. de Echave Sustaeta", but in the mid-1890s he switched to "E. Echave-Sustaeta", and this is how he became referred to. He also published under initials and pen-names, especially "Altobiscar", "Fermín de Altobiscar", and "Fraude". Politically he confronted particularly the mainstream Conservatists, charged with alleged innate tendency to close shady deals with liberals and dubbed "mestizos". Echave-Sustaeta's term at El Pensamiento Navarro coincided with the period of Carlist political domination in the region; the party controlled 5-6 out of 7 Cortes mandates, allocated to Navarre, but none of the dedicated works discusses the newspaper's role.

Echave-Sustaeta later recollected that though he was assured there were prestigious individuals ready to collaborate, in fact he struggled to ensure reasonable content and remained dramatically short of good contributors. Similarly, much later he admitted that technologically the daily remained somewhat antiquated and behind leading newspapers of the time; he quoted limited circulation and constant financial constraints as the key reason. Another problem was increasing fragmentation of Carlism of the 1910s, related to party policy versus peripheral nationalisms, conflict between the Mellistas and the claimant, or question of political alliances. It is not clear whether any of these motives was at play when in April 1917 he handed his resignation.

== Other Pamplonese endeavors (1897–1917) ==
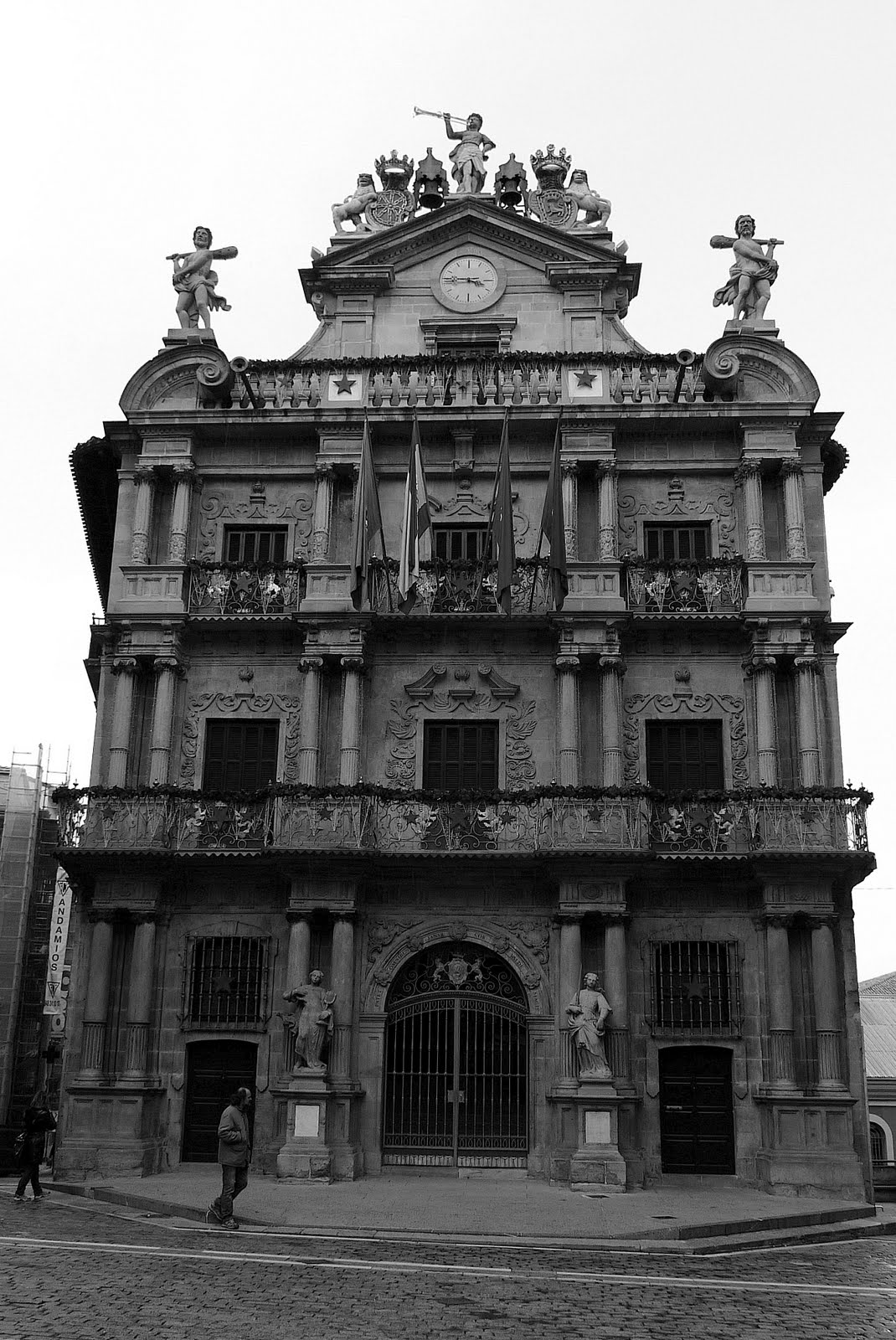
Pamplona town hall

In the late 1890s Echave-Sustaeta entered editorial board of Biblioteca Popular Carlista, a series of booklets and pamphlets issued by a Catalan Traditionalist publishing house. Increasingly seldom he kept contributing correspondence from Pamplona to El Correo Español. In 1911 he became president of Asociación de la Prensa de Pamplona and remained so for 14 years, even after he left the city. In 1913 he briefly managed Trinchera Alavesa, another ephemeral attempt to launch a Vitoria-based Carlist Alavese periodical.

In parallel to his press engagements some time in the late 19th century Echave-Sustaeta launched his career of a lawyer. There is no information on his activity in the bar prior to the year of 1900, yet apparently there was some, as he was admitted to Colegio de Abogados de Pamplona and in 1902 he served as member of a corporate tribunal, assessing candidates for the prosecutor office in Pamplona. In the early 1900s there is evidence of him practicing as a lawyer in civil cases. It is not clear which if any legal firm he represented, yet in 1910 he opened his own office in Pamplona.

In 1905 Echave-Sustaeta was elected to the Pamplonese city council. Thanks to numerous Carlist representation in the corporation he was voted teniente de alcalde, one of a few deputy mayors, and served in Comisión de Fomento. He proved a rather restless and combative member; in 1906 he protested a motion to commemorate liberal politicians Castelar, Pi y Margall and Sagasta, refused to budge, was fined, paid at the spot, left the room and took other Carlists councilors with him, breaking up the entire session. As member of the council in 1906 he took part in public rallies against governmental anti-clerical regulations, especially the so-called Ley del candado. It is not clear when his term expired.

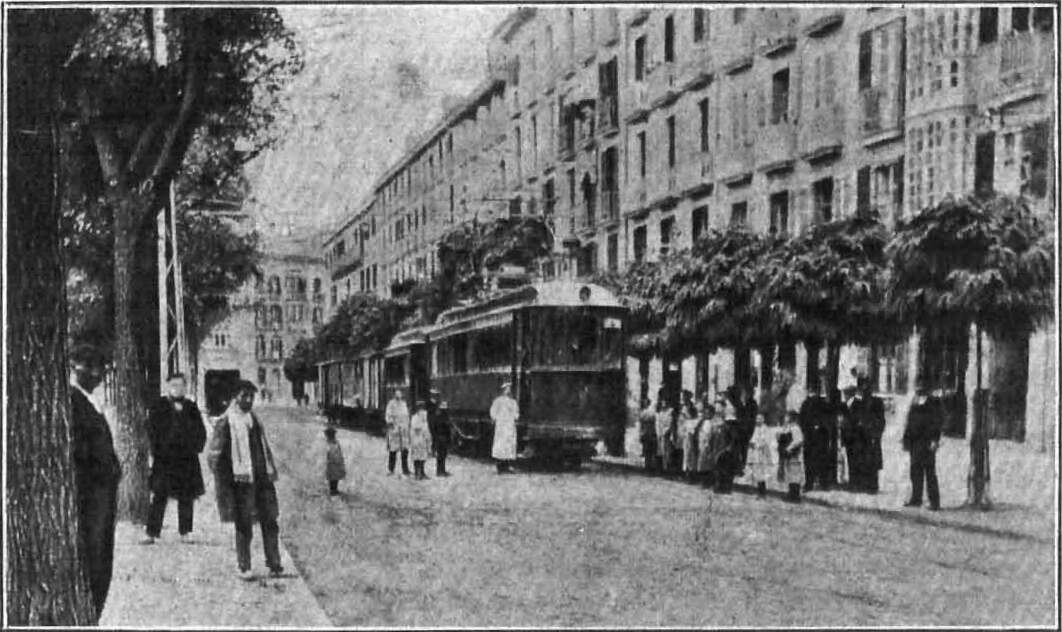
Pamplona, 1910s

During his Pamplonese spell Echave-Sustaeta engaged in social-Catholic initiatives. In 1910 he became the chief editor of La Acción Social Navarra, a Catholic bulletin issued by Federación Católico Social Navarra, a union which promoted "cooperativismo agrario"; he served as its secretario and was member of committees organizing periodical Semana Social. He entered Consejo de Administración of La Regeneración, a company supposed to provide affordable credit and insurance, and served as its secretary. Also in his press articles he promoted understanding between potentially conflicting classes, and underlined common religious and social values. In Carlist structures he formally held no other post than membership in Junta Directiva of Juventud Carlista de Pamplona.

== Fueros ==
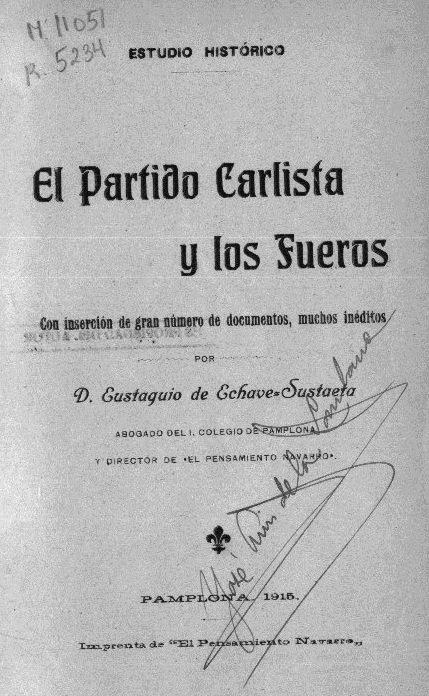
El Partido Carlista...

The press polemic with nationalist Basque ideologues, until 1903 with Sabino Arana and then with his successors, continued also throughout first decades of the 20th century. It gave rise to Echave-Sustaeta's massive 530-page book, published by El Pensamiento Navarro in 1915 and titled Estudio histórico. El Partido Carlista y los Fueros. Con inserción de gran número de documentos, muchos inéditos; the title was a clear reference to Arana's 1897 pamphlet Partido Carlista y los fueros vasko-nabarros. The volume was largely a compilation of articles, published earlier in El Pensamiento. It was prologued by Juan Vázquez de Mella, at the time the key Carlist theorist, Cortes deputy and as great speaker sort of celebrity, which positioned the book as a quasi-official party voice on the issue. The work was promoted in Traditionalist press until 1917, though its impact beyond the Carlist audience was minor.

El Partido Carlista y los Fueros in 68 chapters discussed the history of Carlist position towards separate legal establishments mostly of Navarre, though extensively dealing also with Álava, Gipuzkoa, and Biscay; Catalan and Aragonese fueros were merely mentioned. The narrative covered the period from 1812 to 1912, between the Constitution of Cádiz and latest pronouncements of the new claimant Don Jaime. It was formatted as a historiographic discourse with numerous lengthy quotations from various, mostly though not exclusively Carlist documents, included either in footnotes or in the main body of the text. The volume was intended to demonstrate that throughout the last 100 years Traditionalism was the only current which genuinely incorporated heterogeneity of local regimes into its doctrine and that Carlism was the only party which systematically strove to defend them against centralisation of liberalism-driven Madrid governments. It was also supposed to repudiate nationalist Basque claims that Carlist defence of fueros was merely an opportunistic measure.

COA of país vasco-navarro

Together with his press publications the volume presents Echave-Sustaeta's and to a large extent also the Carlist vision. Fueros are presented as innate, history-grounded regulations to be respected and not as privileges (or contracts), granted (or agreed) by (or with) central authority. They are perceived as specific for separate entities (Navarre, Álava, Gipuzkoa, Biscay) and not as applicable generically to the region. However, despite different internal regimes of all 4 organisms, he understood them to be one entity, Laurak bat (and did not make references to Zazpiak bat, which included also 3 French provinces). When advocating revindicación foral Echave-Sustaeta considered only the pre-1839 regulations as genuine; he viewed later arrangements as distortions, and dismissed the call to restore them as liberal fuerismo. He did not pursue a separatist claim and has never campaigned for breakup with Madrid; his vision was this of monarquía federal, with the king of Spain ruling in Pamplona as king of Navarre or in Bilbao as lord (señor) of Biscay. Though he acknowledged Basque ethnic identity he neither recognized separate Basque political self nor did he relate it to fueros; he rather referred to "vasco-navarros" or "pueblo vasco-navarro", a community built by history and culture.

== Disengagement (1917–1929) ==
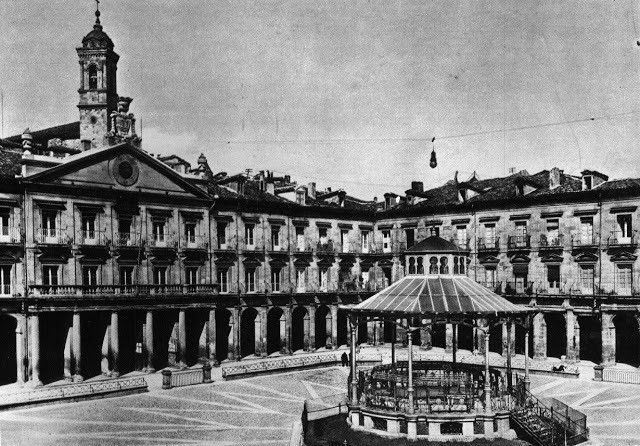
Vitoria, 1920s

None of the sources consulted explains why following 20 years of managing El Pensamiento Navarro and at the age of 45 Echave-Sustaeta abandoned the press career. The official reason he quoted was "para dedicarse á sus trabajos de bufete", yet it is not clear what the background was, and especially whether he resigned willingly or was rather forced to resign. In 1917 he left Pamplona; it is not entirely certain where he lived. One source claims that he settled in the third largest Navarrese city, Estella. Some press notes from the early 1920s confirm that he was active there, as he was mentioned in related societé or political columns, and was referred to as "el abogado en Estella". In the late 1910s he was also noted as resident in his house in Elciego. However, most evidence is about his law career when resumed at the courts of Vitoria.

At the turn of the decades Echave-Sustaeta found himself in the shadow of his younger brother Antonio, who emerged as key figure within the Alavese diputación provincial and in the hostile liberal press was ridiculed as a politician who believed that "he was the boss and the master of the province". Eustaquio remained moderately engaged in Carlism, e.g. in 1918 he supported the party candidate Gervasio de Artiñano y Galdácano, who was running for the Cortes from the Laguardia district. At the time the movement was increasingly paralyzed by the conflict between the key theorist Vázquez de Mella and the claimant Don Jaime, yet in historiography Echave-Sustaeta is not listed as committed to any of the sides. When in 1919 the dispute erupted into full-blown confrontation he stayed loyal to his king; during the Cortes electoral campaign of 1920 he supported the Jaimista candidate Esteban Bilbao, who was successfully running from the Estella district.

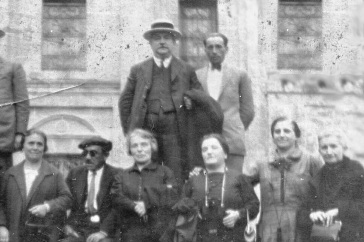
with family (centre), 1920s

Following the 1923 coup of Primo de Rivera the party life in Spain was brought to a standstill and Echave-Sustaeta's political activities terminated. In public he was known as a lawyer practicing in Vitoria, though he no longer appeared in civil cases; instead, he was rather listed as defense attorney in criminal proceedings. He represented defendants charged with theft (1917), bodily harm (1920), break-in (1922), resistance to authority (1923), burglary (1924) and again theft (1925). He was member of Colegio de Abogados de Vitoria. Echave-Sustaeta's Carlist activities were reduced to some cultural endeavors, e.g. in 1927 he contributed to a homage album dedicated to the party propagandist, Francisco Oller. In the late 1920s he was mentioned on societé columns only. Together with his wife he was also moderately engaged in charity.

== Resumed Carlist activities (1929–1936) ==
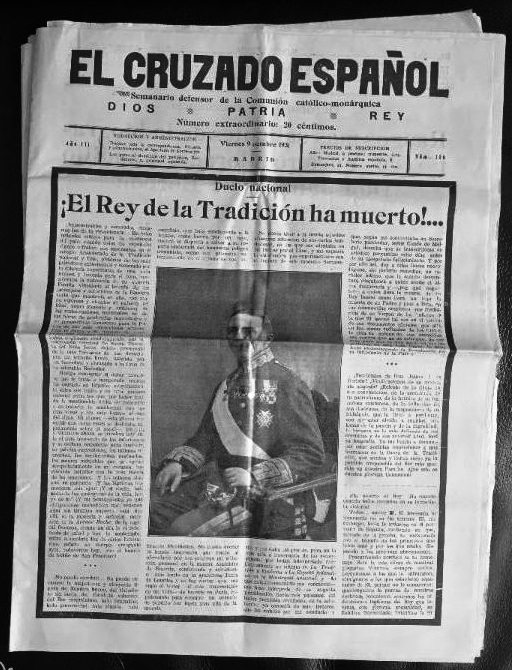
El Cruzado Español

During the very last months of the dictatorship and following a 12-year break, Echave-Sustaeta resumed his Carlist press engagements. Since 1922 there was no Carlist periodical issued in Madrid; in the late 1920s a group of enthusiasts decided to launch a new one, which materialized in 1929 as a weekly (later bi-weekly) El Cruzado Español. Contributions from Echave-Sustaeta appeared from the very onset and he seemed closely related to the board. At one point he confessed that "we hope to convert it into a daily", and at another he signed a manifesto, which pledged to confront liberalism, separatism and "bolchevismo católico". His political pieces hailed Primo and advocated organic corporative state; he also dedicated a number of columns to agricultural sindicates. However, most of his contributions, sent from Elciego, were dealing with Carlist history. His last contribution identified comes from late 1930 and Echave-Sustaeta was not related to Cruzado when it assumed a somewhat rebellious Carloctavista stand.

When dictatorship was crumbling Echave-Sustaeta politically remained in the shadow of his brother; a 1930 manifesto, issued by Carlist executive, in name of the Alavese branch was signed by Antonio. However, in December 1931 both brothers were members of Junta Provincial of Comunión Tradicionalista. In mid-1933 it was Eustaquio who rose to president of Junta Provincial, but in 1934 he was referred to as vicepresidente. There are sporadic notes of him speaking at Carlist rallies in Álava, e.g. in 1933 in Laguardia and in 1934 again in Laguardia. A historian underlines that in the mid-1930s both brothers were among "personalidades de gran ascendiente en la sociedad alavesa", though within Carlist structures in Álava the dominant role was rather assumed by the Oriol clan, with José Luis Oriol holding the Cortes mandate and representing the province in the party Junta Nacional. He was engaged in works on the joint vasco-navarrese autonomy statute.

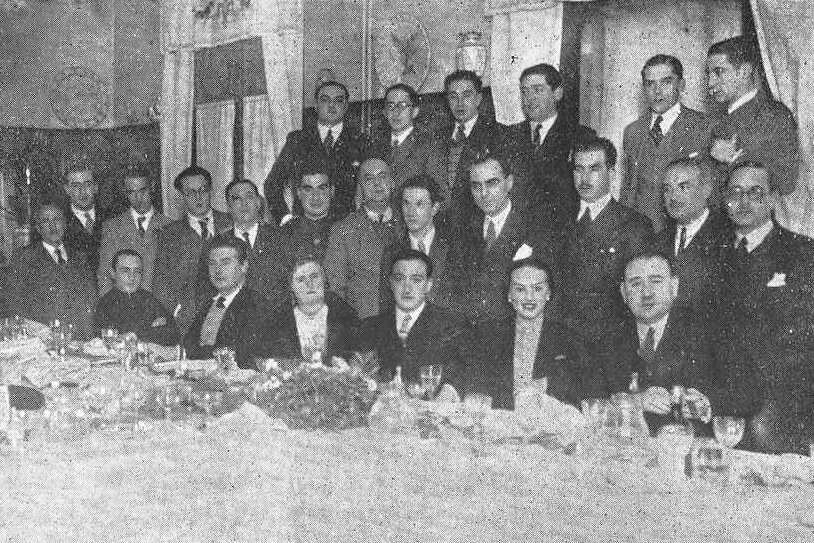
with Tradición editorial board (1934)

In 1933 Echave-Sustaeta started contributing to an ambitious Carlist bi-monthly Tradición, though his pieces were revolving around recollections related to the recent past. In 1934 he was appointed to Tesoro de la Tradición, the body entrusted with taking care of the party finances. The same year he was nominated to Consejo de Cultura da la Comunión, an 18-member council composed of pundits and supposed to provide ideological guidance. Though in terms of political decision-making he mattered little and monographs on Carlism during the Republican period ignore him altogether, one scholar counts him among members of "cúpula tradicionalista", the intellectual elite of Comunión Tradicionalista. He notes also that out of 26 individuals examined, he among the 6 who have always remained loyal to the doctrine and dynasty, not stained by secessions or deviations. At the time Echave-Sustaeta lived at his estate in Elciego; in his early 60s, he kept practicing as a defense attorney in Vitoria.

== Rise to provincial tycoon (1936–1937) ==
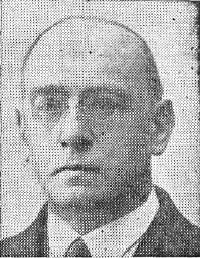
José Luis Oriol

Echave-Sustaeta was actively engaged in Carlist anti-Republican plot. Since the mid-1930s he was taking part in schemes related to smuggling arms for a future rising. Some scholars present him as the key conspirator in Álava, "hombre clave en la organización del golpe" and "rector de la conspiración de la provincia". It was him who on July 15 met Rodezno in Pamplona and carried the order to rise to Vitoria, to the local requeté commander Luis Rabanera. The province was relatively easily seized by the rebels; on July 30 the local military commander nominated him to the new, rebel-appointed Diputación Provincial. One month later the new Military Governor, colonel Cándido Fernández Ichaso, considered the situation in Álava stable and "no longer in need" of military leadership; on August 28 he nominated Echave-Sustaeta president of the Diputación. Some scholars speculate he owned the nomination to being Oriol's trusted man, others suspect he was chosen simply as the oldest one.

Diputación held little real power, as all key decisions were made by the military. However, within the limits allowed, the body tried to shape political climate in the province. Historians do not necessarily agree whether it was "diputación más homogénea ideológicamente", controlled by "tradicionalismo oriolista", or whether it was rather "castrense y de amplia coalición". However, under Echave-Sustaeta's guidance it advanced "programa provincialista (foralista)", trying to resurrect some of the long-abolished fueros. Echave-Sustaeta attempted also to saturate public life with Traditionalism, e.g. in his propagandistic pieces he compared the ongoing advance on Madrid to Expedición real of 1837. At the time he was also the provincial Carlist comisario de guerra.

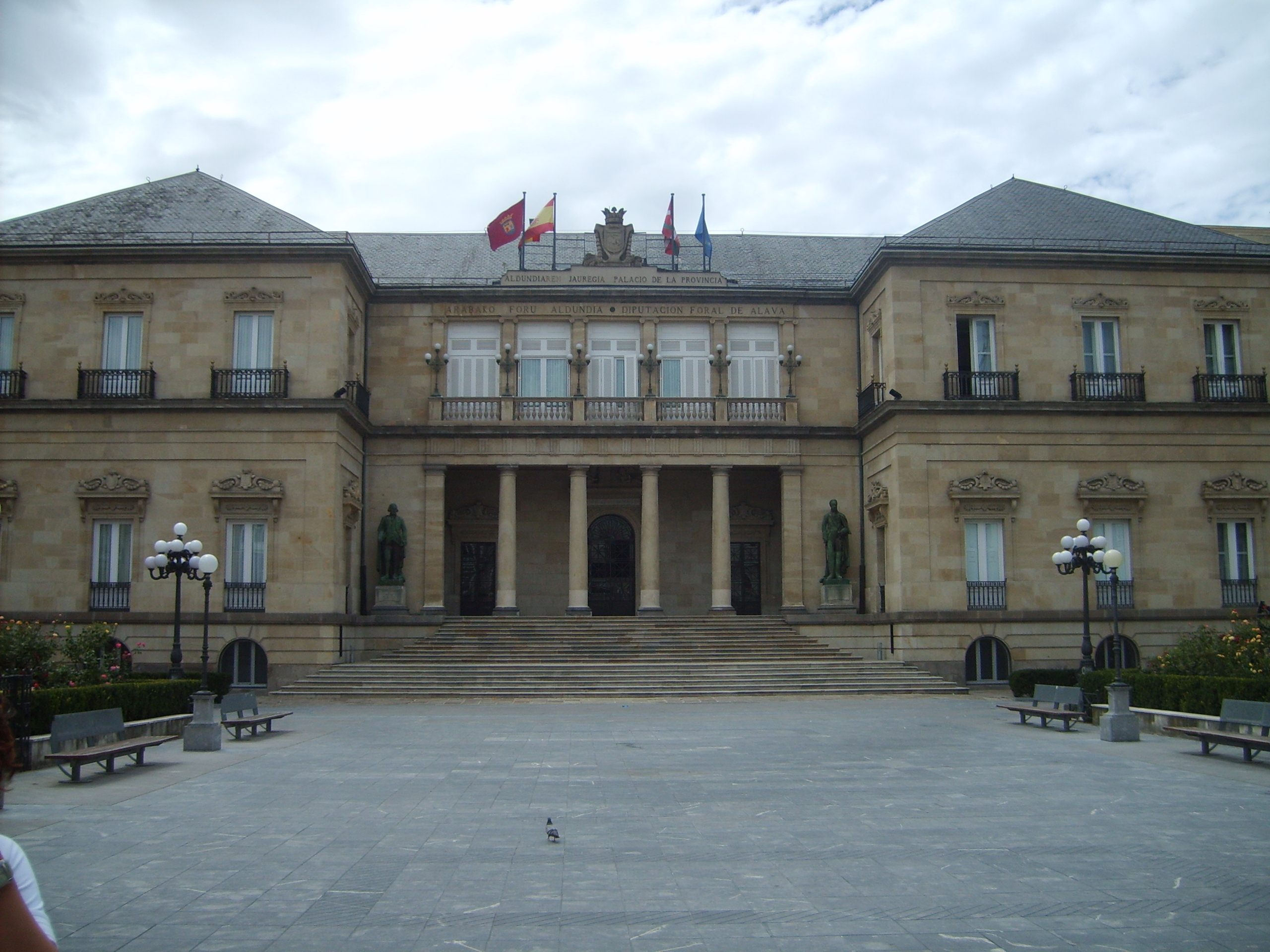
Diputacion Provincial, Vitoria

Echave-Sustaeta was reportedly opposed to enforced Francoist political unification of April 1937, yet there is little evidence of his dissent in its aftermath. Within structures of the newly created state party, Falange Española Tradicionalista, on May 1 he was nominated one of 9 Delegados Provinciales (provincial leaders) who came with the Carlist background (against 22 Falangist old-shirts). Álava was one of very few provinces where Traditionalism dominated over Falangism; in the provincial FET executive there were 7 Carlists (including Echave-Sustaeta's nephew) and only 2 Falangists. In line with the overall pattern of alternating a Carlist and a Falangist at provincial positions of delegado and secretario, the latter post was assigned to a Falangist old-shirt Hilario Catón Presa, but initially he was no match for Echave-Sustaeta. His nomination was hailed as "decreto trascendentalísimo" by the Carlists and was greeted with ice-cold welcome by the Falangists.

== Leadership and demise (1937 and after) ==
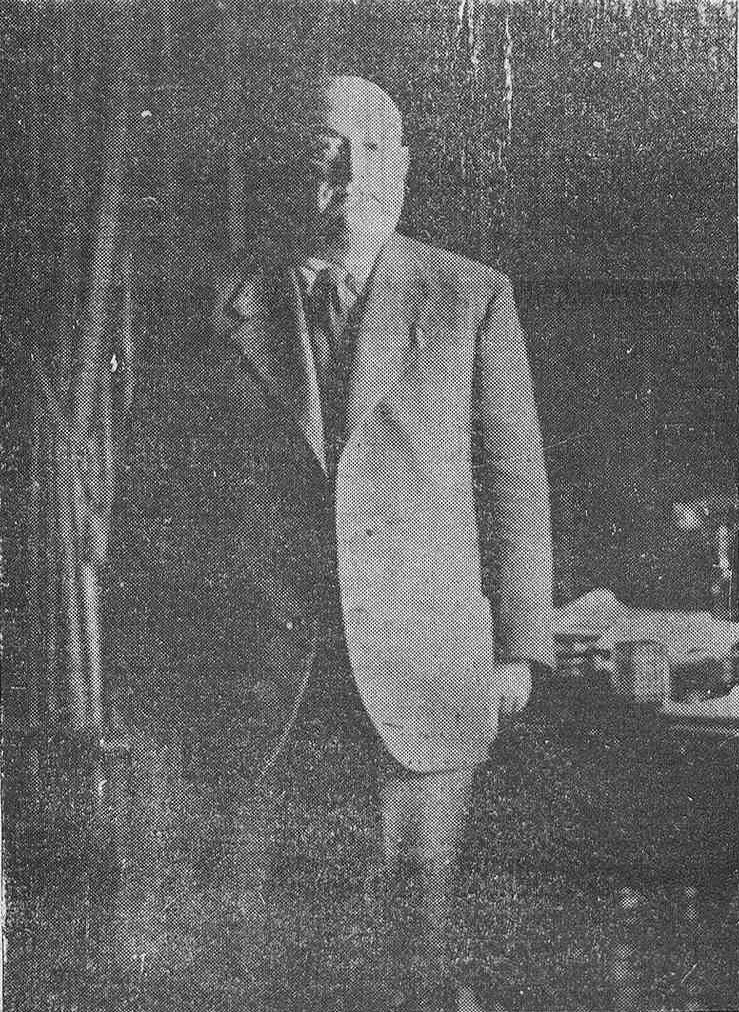
Echave-Sustaeta, 1937

Double-hatting as president of Diputación and provincial FET leader Echave-Sustaeta was the highest-positioned civilian in Álava. Historians present him as a representative of "pragmatismo oriolista", a Traditionalism-embedded caciquismo championed by José Luis Oriol. However, his Traditionalist stance was not superficial, e.g. he launched the project of erecting a monument to the 19th-century Carlist hero Zumalacárregui. He was later credited for saving some separate provincial establishments, which Álava retained unlike Gipuzkoa and Biscay, two other Basque provinces declared treacherous by the regime. Today historians are not sure whether indeed his voice mattered, and some fellow Carlists were enraged about his engagement in anti-fuerista Francoist administration. Whenever possible, he tried to contain influence of Falangist old-shirts, e.g. by ordering crackdown on their premises serving as arms depots.

In August 1937 the post of civil governor was ceded by colonel Fernández Ichaso to Eladio Esparza; earlier marginally related to Carlism, at the time he already represented "a new vision". He provided a counter-balance to the oriolista domination, reinforced following a Falangist counter-action and complaints centrally. In early October 1937 Echave-Sustaeta was replaced as FET Delegado Provincial by José María de Elizgarate; an official statement read that he had been asking for release for some time. Carlists lost domination in the new FET executive; the fall of 1937 marks the beginning of "verdadera nueva política" in Álava, i.e. replacing generic right-wing domination with systematic implementation of new Francoist rule. Diputación remained as "último reducto de los oriolistas en Alava", lambasted by Falangists as rotten nucleus of "old politics". It did not last for long; though as late as in January 1938 Echave-Sustaeta was engaged in maneuvers intended to save local Gipuzkoan prerogatives, in March 1938 he quoted health reasons and resigned from the self-government; the moment marked the end of "diputacion oriolista".

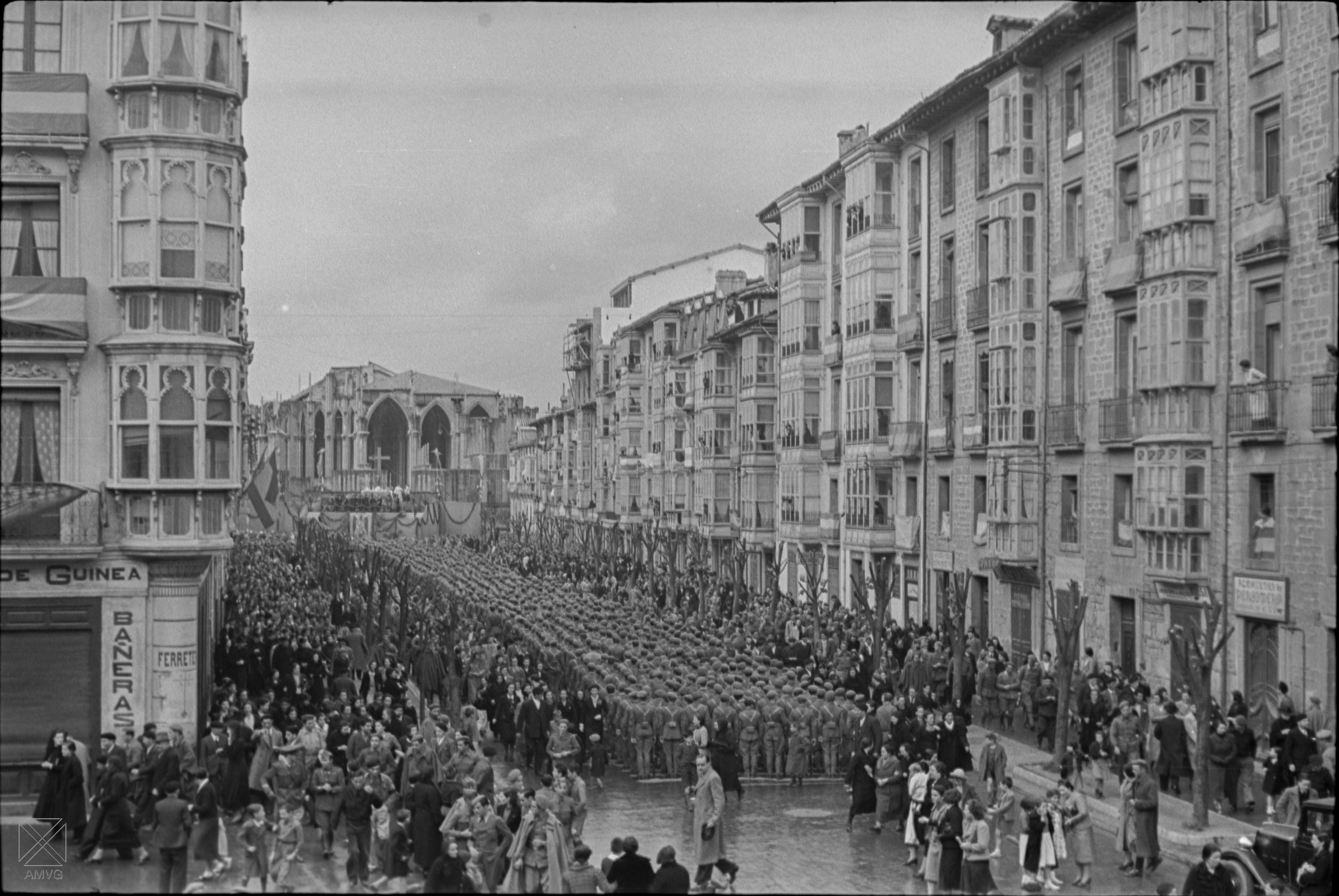
Vitoria, end of Civil War

Until the early 1940s it was his brother Antonio who served as secretario of the Diputación, which kept generating constant backlash on part of the Falangist old-shirts; it eventually produced his dismissal with charges of financial embezzlement. Following his resignation Eustaquio did not assume any public role, he withdrew into privacy of his Elciego residence and seemed indeed plagued by poor health. He is not mentioned in historiographic works on Carlism of the early Francoist era. As a septuagenarian, in the press of the 1940s he was noted only when donating money to patriotic causes, e.g. in support of División Azul, because of family reasons or as "El Jefe" of Cooperativa Vinícola de Elciego, a local wine-growing cooperative. His death was not acknowledged by main media, and it was noted only in the local Alavese titles.

== See also ==
- Carlism
- El Pensamiento Navarro
- Fuero
