= Compañía Vinícola del Norte de España =

Family winery in Spain

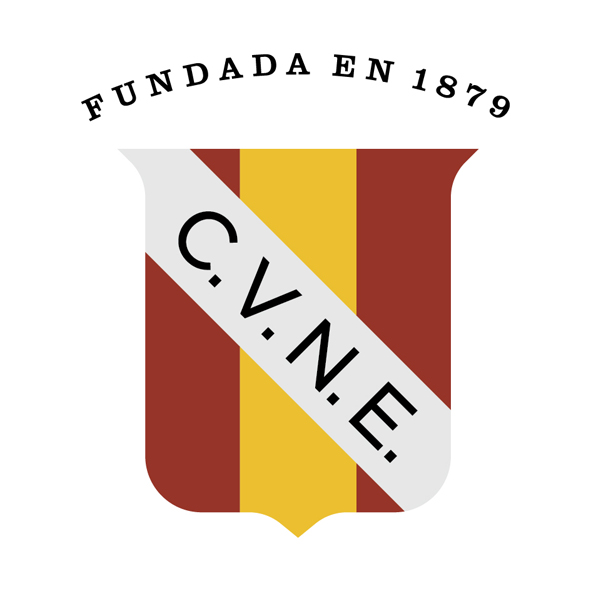

C.V.N.E, Compañía Vinícola del Norte de España (the Northern Spanish Wine Company) is a family winery that was founded in 1879 in the town of Haro in Rioja, Spain. It is within the classification of Denominación de Origen Calificada Rioja.

Since its foundation, the company has maintained its family character (it is already the 5th generation) and has focused on the production and aging of wines. It consists of 8 wineries, C.V.N.E. (D.O.Ca Rioja), Imperial (D.O.Ca Rioja), Viña Real (D.O.Ca Rioja), Viñedos del Contino (D.O.Ca Rioja), Roger Goulart (Cava); Virgen del Galir (D. O.Valdeorras), Bela (D.O.Ribera del Duero) and La Val (D.O.Rías Baixas), in addition to Castillo de Davalillo (San Asensio, La Rioja) which became part of C.V.N.E. in 2019.

C.V.N.E. owns around 1,000 hectares of vineyards, making it the largest winery in terms of vineyards in Spain. In addition to being a leading brand in the Spanish market, it is a world reference in excellence and quality and its wines are ambassadors of Spain worldwide.

== History ==
In the middle of the 19th century, due to an epidemic of phylloxera, the French vineyards were lost. That event prompted French winegrowers to look for alternative sites for wine production. Haro, located in an area where wine production was traditional, with good soil, a good climate, and a good railroad connection, showed to be a priority and optimal area for this purpose.

In 1879, the Bilbao brothers, Raimundo and Eusebio Real de Asúa along with the Riojan oenologist Isidro Corcuera del Campo, founded the Compañía Vinícola del Norte de España in the Haro station district, which began wine production with the French know-how. In a short time, they achieved a good product that was awarded in several international competitions (1885 Silver and Bronze Medals - Antwerp Universal Exhibition. 1888 Gold Medal - International Exposition Barcelona. 1889 Gold Medal - International Exhibition Paris. 1890 Gold Medal - International Exhibition Antwerp).

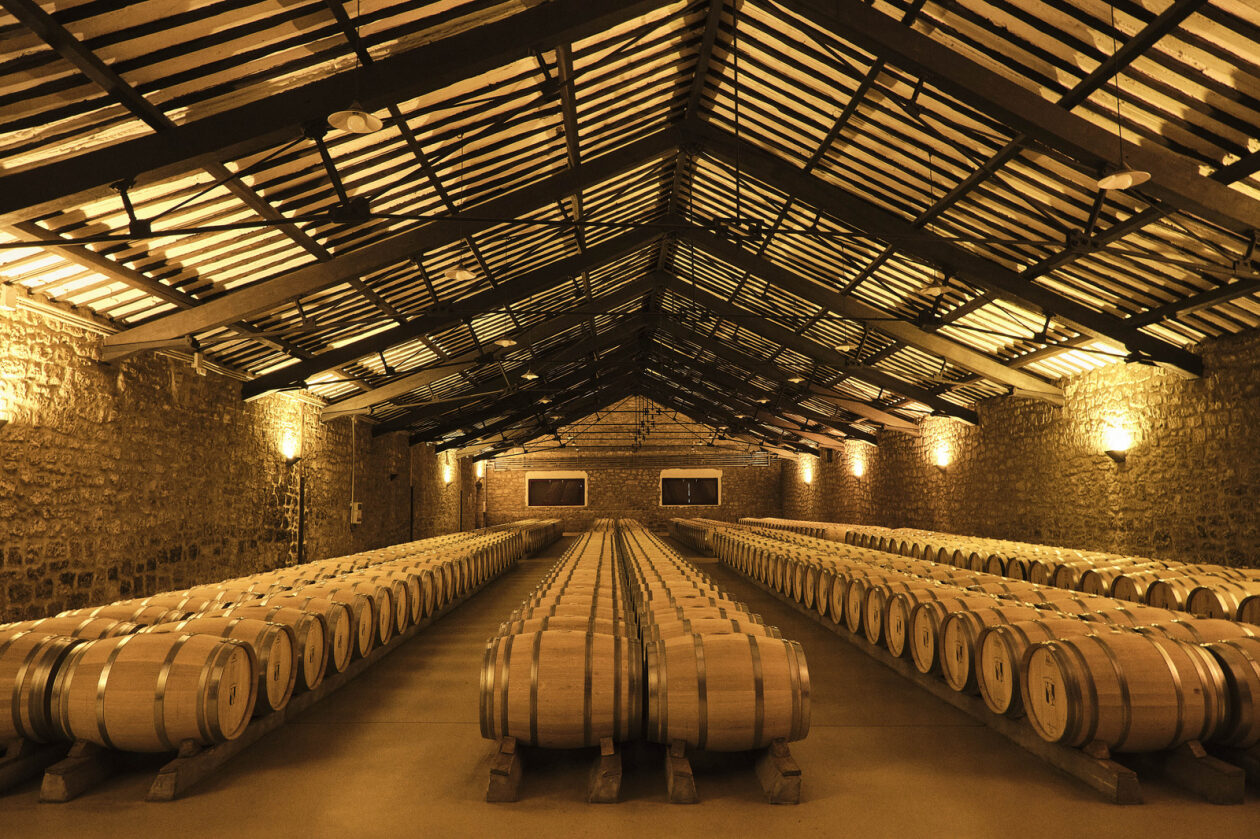
The Eiffel cellar, designed by Gustave Eiffel in 1890

In 1890 the famous French architect, Aleixandre Gustave Eiffel, designed this cellar. Truly revolutionary, this imposing structure provided an innovative formula to support its construction. Without columns, the roof is supported by steel trusses, running from wall to wall allowing for a large open space that significantly improved the management of barrels in the cellar, to make racking, maintenance, and monitoring of the wine barrels easier.

In 1915, the brand “Monopole” was born. A young, pale, dry, fresh, and fruity white wine, becoming the first white wine brand to be registered. In 1920 the brands "Viña Real" and "Imperial" we launched.

In 1940 the first winemaking concrete plant in Spain was built at C.V.N.E.

In 1973, through Viñedos del Contino, C.V.N.E. started up a winery in the style of the French "château".

In 1989, the first non-aggressive winemaking facility in Spain using gravity to transport the must was launched at C.V.N.E. “El Pilar”

In 1994, C.V.N.E. launched the wine "Real de Asúa" in honour of the founders.

In 2004, the company inaugurated a new winery for Viña Real, with an impressive building, work of the architect Philippe Mazieres, and equipped with vanguardist technology, resulting in the home of the wines Viña Real, brand launched in the 20s.

In 2005 the Imperial winery is built as an independent winery within the walls of the original historic C.V.N.E. winery site, with large French oat vats and concrete tanks.

In 2013, the “Imperial Gran Reserva 2004” wine was awarded as the #1 wine in the Top 100 Wine Spectator ranking of the US magazine. It thus became the first Spanish wine to achieve it. In addition, C.V.N.E. obtained the Double Environmental Footprint by calculating the carbon footprint and water footprint in the production of "Cune Crianza" wine.

In 2014 C.V.N.E. with his philosophy of expansion came into the Japanese market through the acquisition of the distributor Mikuni Wines.

In 2015 C.V.N.E. was awarded Spanish Wine Producer of the Year by IWSC (International Wine and Spirit Competition).

In 2017, C.V.N.E. acquired, Roger Goulart, a pioneer winery in the traditional way of making sparkling wine, Cava, in Spain that was founded back in 1882.

In 2018, Virgen del Galir winery joined the C.V.N.E. family. Virgen del Galir was founded in 2002 in the village of Entoma, Orense (Galicia), within the D.O. Valdeorras.

In 2019 the Bela winery in Ribera del Duero was founded, in honour of the family of the founders (Bela was the nickname of Sofia, one of the daughters of Eusebio Real de Asúa, great-grandmother of the current managers).

In March 2023, C.V.N.E. formalized the incorporation of Bodegas La Val located in Salvaterra de Miño (Rías Baixas). Founded in 1985, it was one of the pioneers in the production of Albariño and the driving force behind the creation of the Rías Baixas Designation of Origin.

== Wineries ==
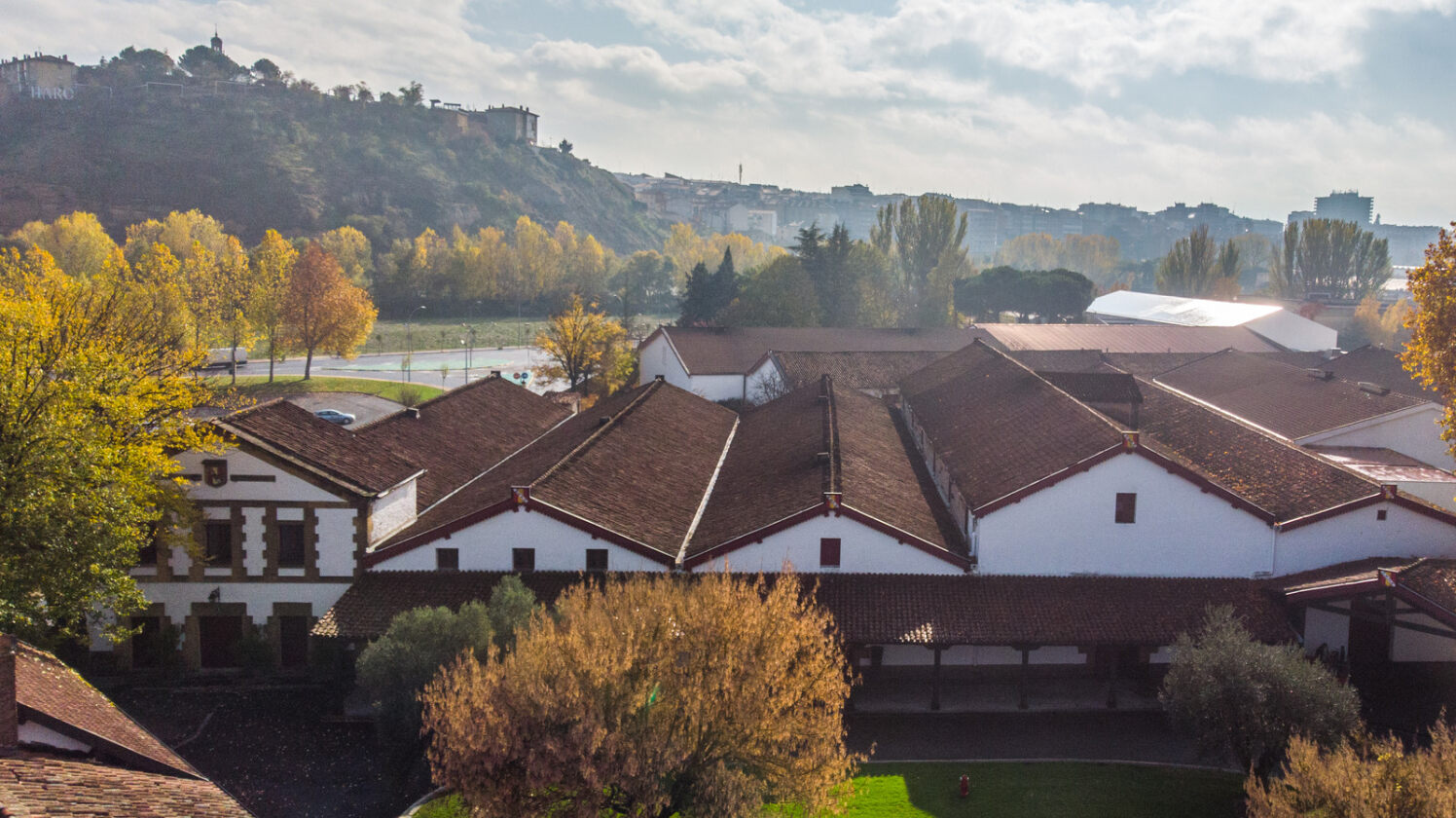
C.V.N.E.

=== C.V.N.E. ===
This winery gave rise to the company and still maintains its original location in the Barrio de la Estación, in the town of Haro. Founded in 1879, it was configured over the years through several buildings, distributed around a central courtyard. Among its spaces, the Eiffel cellar stands out, a work of the famous engineer Gustave Eiffel, which represented an architectural revolution as it did not have columns, or the Fundational cellar, the oldest of the winery.

=== Imperial ===
The Imperial winery is a small, singular, and autonomous winery located inside the original C.V.N.E installations in Haro, where the history of the company started. In this winery, the emblematic wine is produced only when the harvests are exceptional. The wine-making process is made under rigorous quality control, with individualized monitoring by the terroir and in the most artisanal way possible.

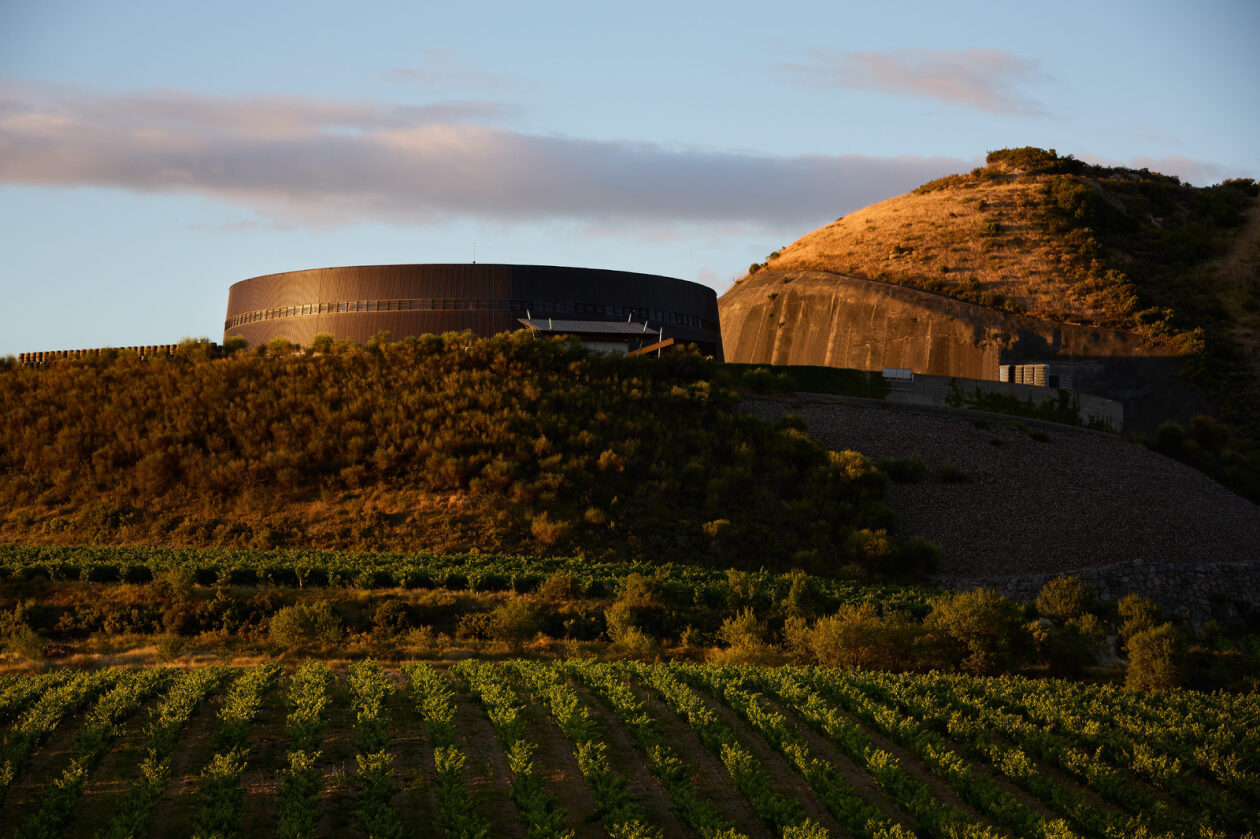
Viña Real

=== Viña Real ===
The Viña Real winery, located 10 minutes from Logroño, is the work of the French architect Philippe Mazieres. Inaugurated in 2004 by King Juan Carlos I, it is located on top of Cerro de la Mesa. The brand as such was created by C.V.N.E. in 1920 as a commitment to Rioja Alavesa wines. It was the first winery in Spain to be fully adapted for the blind and visually impaired using specialized signage to allow them a complete visit to the winery. This winery has two caverns for storage that house more than 14,000 barrels.

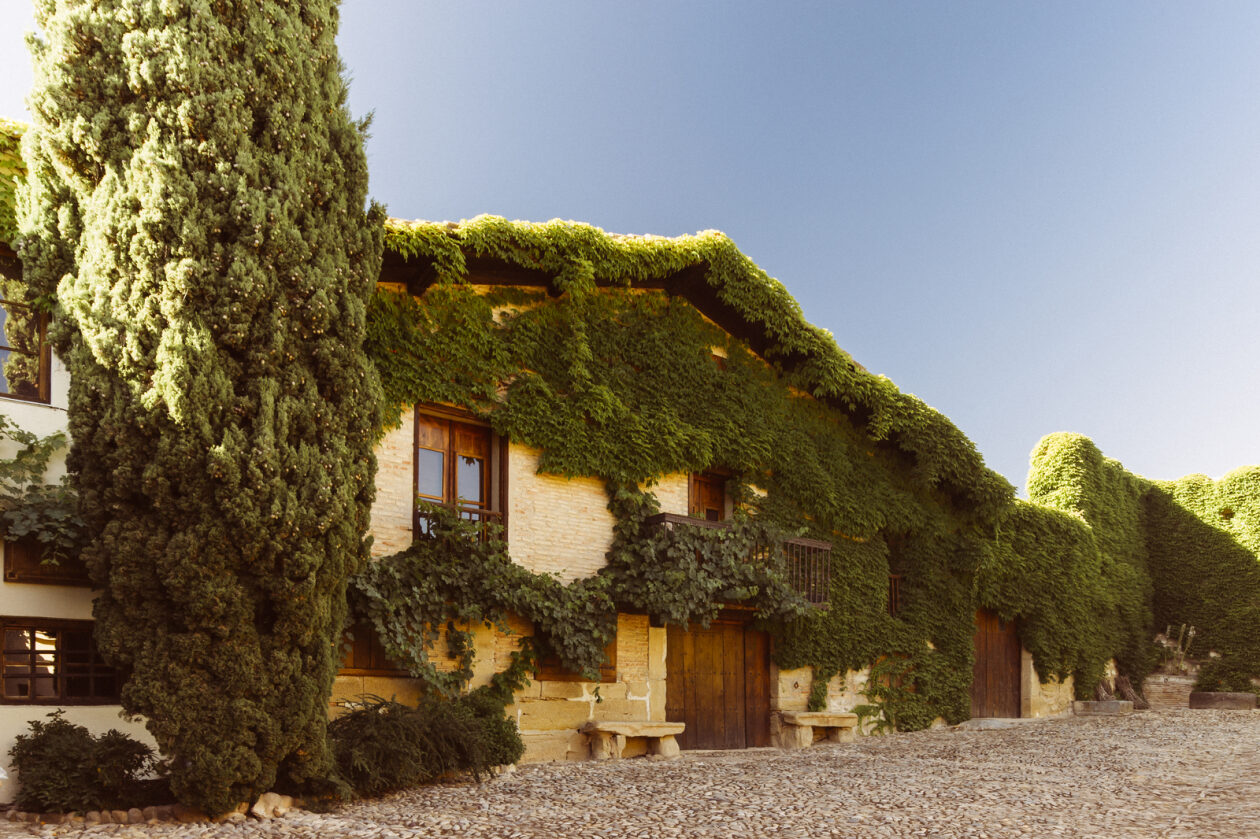
Viñedos del Contino

=== Viñedos del Contino ===
Viñedos del Contino forms a set-in which vineyards and wines are integrated. It is established around an old manor house, in a meander of the Ebro River. Its wines are obtained only from the vines planted in its 62 hectares that combine different soils, heights, and grape varieties, located in Laserna, in the lands of Laguardia (Rioja Alavesa). The winery has an individualized system of grape harvesting, coming only from the same vineyards that surround the manor house, and the personality of each wine is marked by the origin of its plot. Contino established in Rioja in 1973 the concept of the Bordeaux "chateau" next to an ancient olive tree, thus becoming the only pioneer in importing this style of winery and winemaking in Spain.

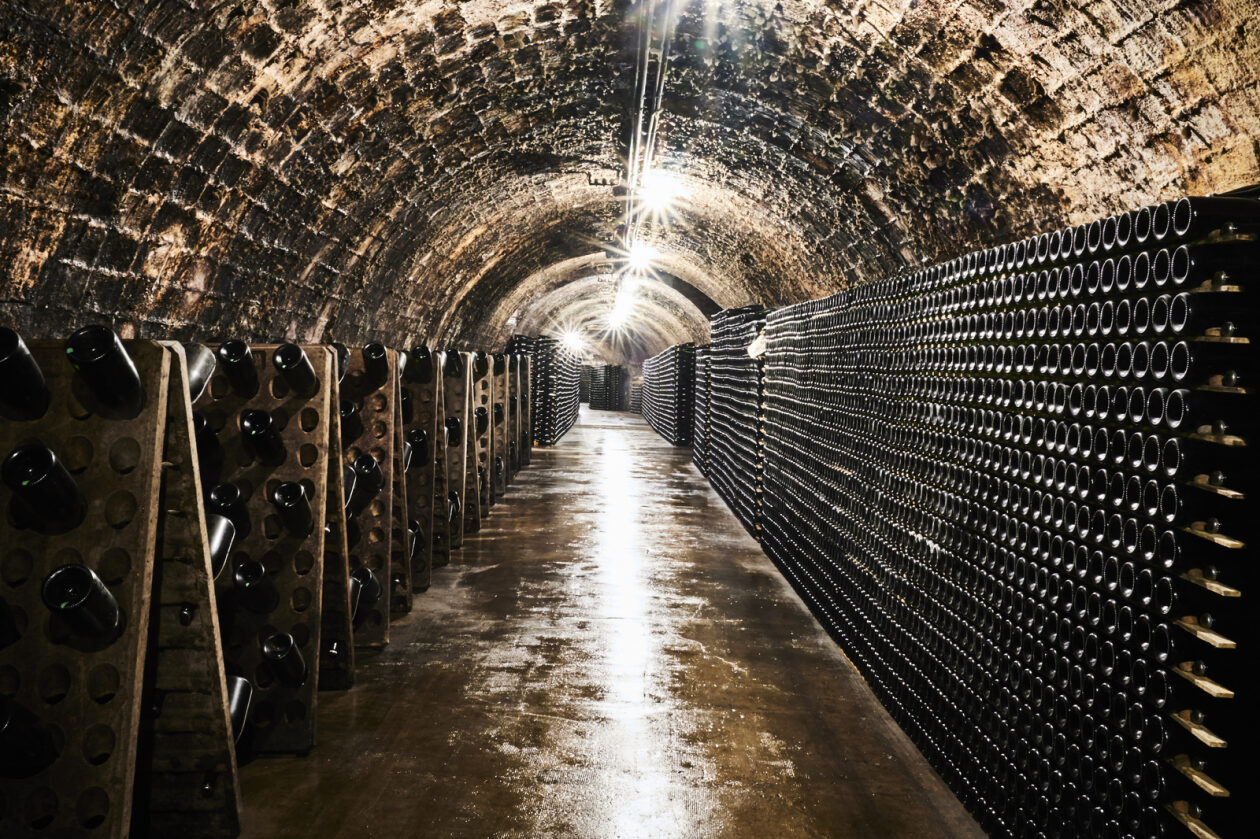
Roger Goulart

=== Roger Goulart ===
Roger Goulart is located in the wine-growing area of Penedès (Catalonia), the origins of the winery date back to the end of the 19th century. More than140 years later, and after being known as the "cathedrals of cava" they have been part of the C.V.N.E. group since 2017. It has facilities dedicated exclusively to the production of natural cavas by the traditional method. Under the cellar an impressive set of subway galleries was excavated at 30 meters that treasure unique temperature and humidity conditions to produce high-expression wines, thus managing to provide naturally and constantly the ideal conditions for the fermentation in a bottle of high-quality cavas.

=== Virgen del Galir ===
The Virgen del Galir winery is located in the Galir River valley, in the lands of Éntoma (Ourense). A traditional winery known for its Godello white wines, it focuses on the elaboration of wines with care and attention to detail. Due to a peculiar way of cultivation inherited from the Romans, its 20 hectares of vineyards are arranged in terraces, at an altitude of more than 600 meters and with an unevenness of 40%, achieving wines with a strong character.

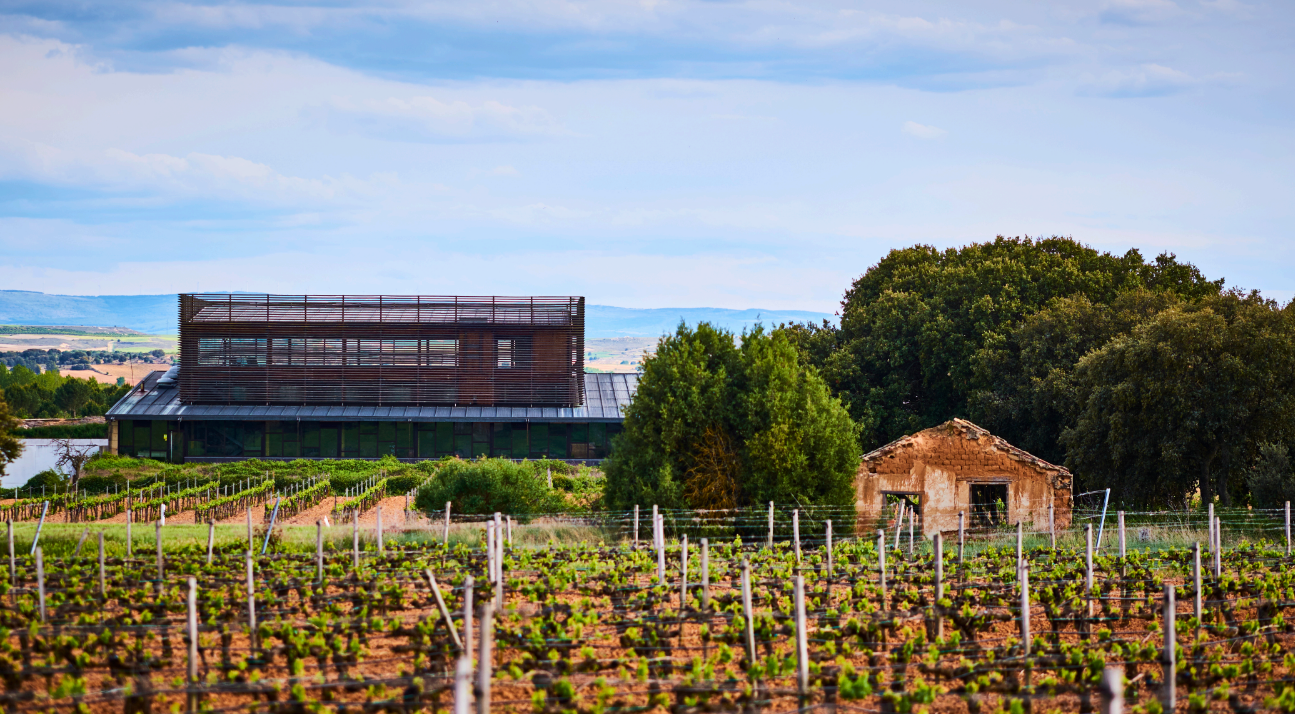
Bela

=== Bela ===
Located in Villalba de Duero, the winery was officially inaugurated in October 2021 and has more than 6,000 m² of facilities where the subway barrel room stands out, capable of housing up to 10,000 barrels. This new project, based on the vineyards owned in different villages in the area, combines the necessary elements to create a unique place for the production and aging of singular wines that represent their origin.

This winery is a tribute to the ancestors of the C.V.N.E. family, the name of the winery honours Sofia, daughter of the co-founder of the winery in 1879 who was called "Bela" in the family environment.

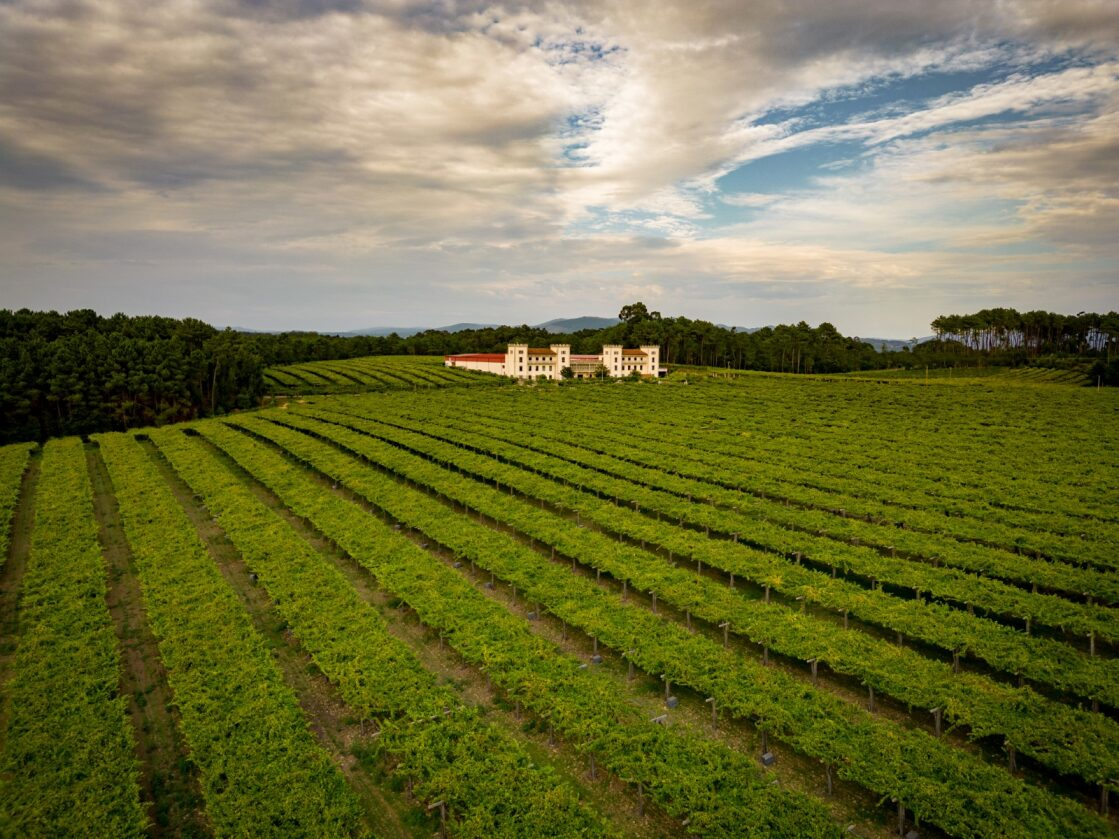
La Val

=== LA VAL ===
La Val winery dates back to 1985 and is one of the pioneer wineries in the production of the Albariño wine variety, characteristic of the Rías Baixas and the Denomination of Origin to which it gives its name. This winery is one of the most relevant in the sector in Rías Baixas and has more than 90 hectares of vineyards. La Val, located in Salvaterra de Miño, in Condado de Tea, joined the C.V.N.E. group in March 2023.

== Davalillo Castle ==
C.V.N.E. acquired the Davalillo Castle in 2019 to recover it and give it an innovative and unique cultural and tourist use. Thus, the company will be in charge of rehabilitating it entirely. The aim is to recover a castle that was in serious danger of disappearing and turn it into an icon that will attract visitors and become an icon of wine tourism in the surrounding area.

== Own importers and distributor ==
C.V.N.E. own in Japan the wine importer Mikuni Wine. It also owns three distributors: Arano (USA), C.V.N.E. China (China), and Montenegro (Spain).

== Awards ==
- #1 Wine Spectator 2013. Imperial Gran Reserva 2004 was the first Spanish wine to reach the top spot on the list.
- Top #8 World's Most Admired Wine Brand by the British magazine Drinks International 2021. And in the #31 position in 2023.
- First Spanish winery to receive 100 Parker points for a white wine Corona 1939 and two red wines Viña Real 1947 and 1959.
- Tripadvisor's "Travellers' Choice 2022" award, placing the winery among the top 10% of attractions worldwide.
- Incorporation in the International Wineries for Climate Action (IWCA).
- Gold Medal at the International Exposition of Barcelona (1888), Paris (1889/1900), Antwerp (1890), Bruges (1895).
- Best Wine Producer of Spain Award granted by IWSC (2015).
