= Elciego =

Coordinates: 42°31′N 2°37′W

Elciego Eltziego (Basque)
- Municipality
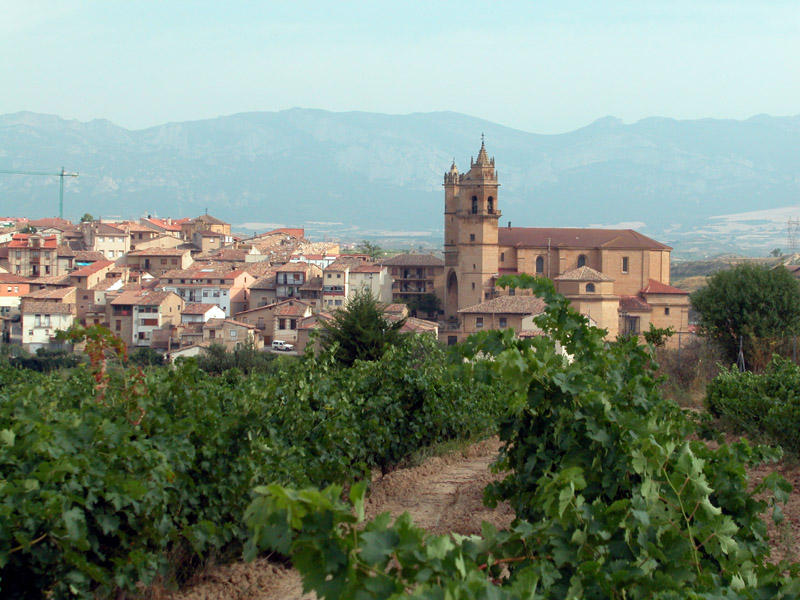

- Flag Coat of arms
- Interactive map of Elciego
- Country: Spain
- Autonomous community: Basque Country
- Province: Álava
- Comarca: Cuadrilla de Laguardia-Rioja Alavesa
- Founded: 1583

Government
  - Alcalde: Luis Aldazabal (Independent)

Area
  - Total: 16.32 km^{2} (6.30 sq mi)
- Elevation: 451 m (1,480 ft)

Population (2025-01-01)
  - Total: 971
  - Density: 59.5/km^{2} (154/sq mi)
- Demonym(s): Elcieguense, Ollero
- Time zone: UTC+1 (CET)
  - Summer (DST): UTC+2 (CEST)
- Postal code: 01340
- Official language(s): Basque, Spanish
- Website: Official website

Elciego (Basque: Eltziego) is a town and municipality located at the southern end of the province of Álava, in the Basque Country, northern Spain.

This town lies in the world-famous Rioja wine-production region, and is home to the architecturally cutting-edge Hotel Marqués de Riscal, opened in 2006, designed by renowned architect Frank Gehry.

== Notable people ==
- Eustaquio Echave-Sustaeta Pedroso (1872-1952), Carlist politician

== Gallery ==
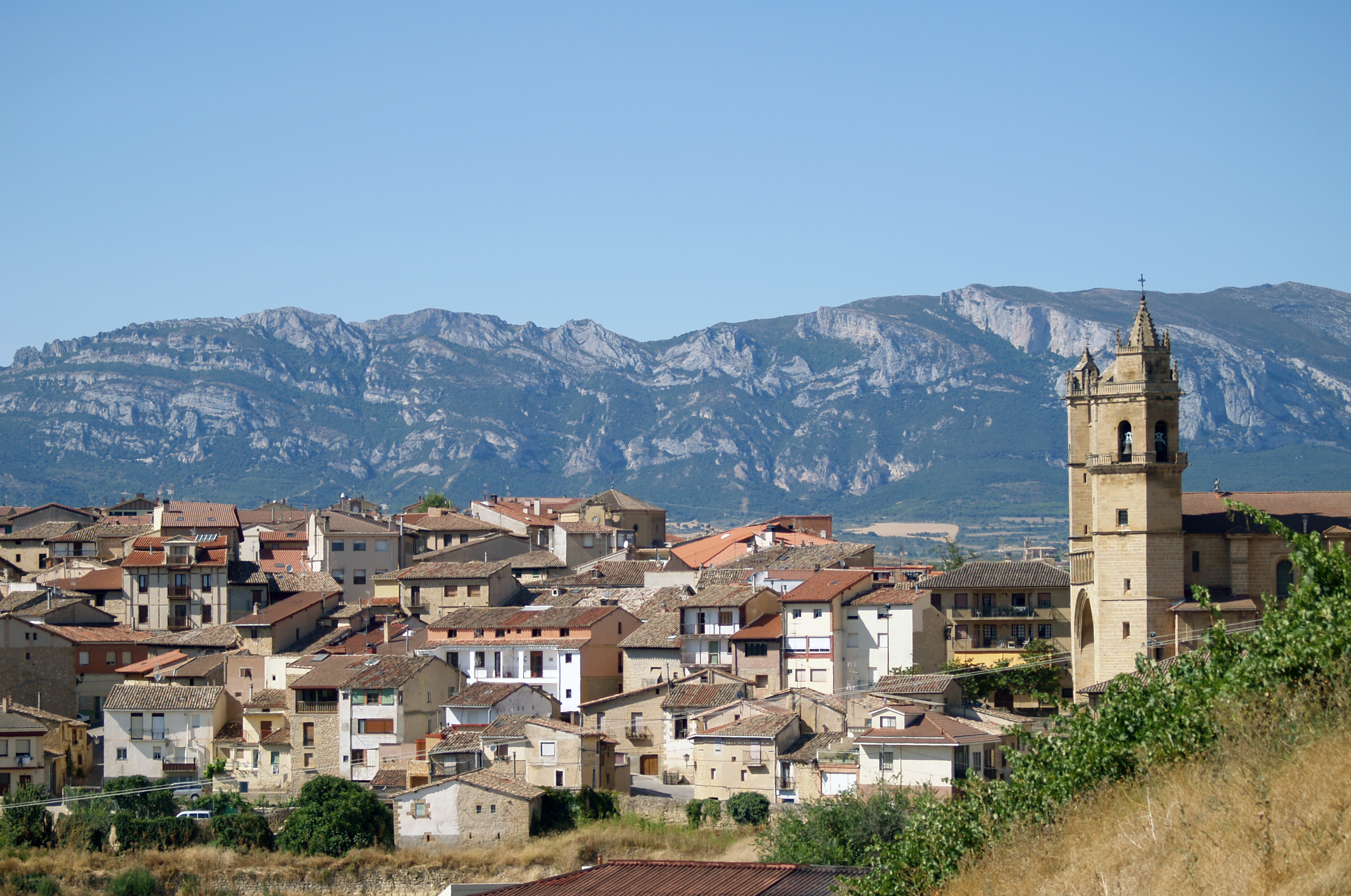
View of Elciego

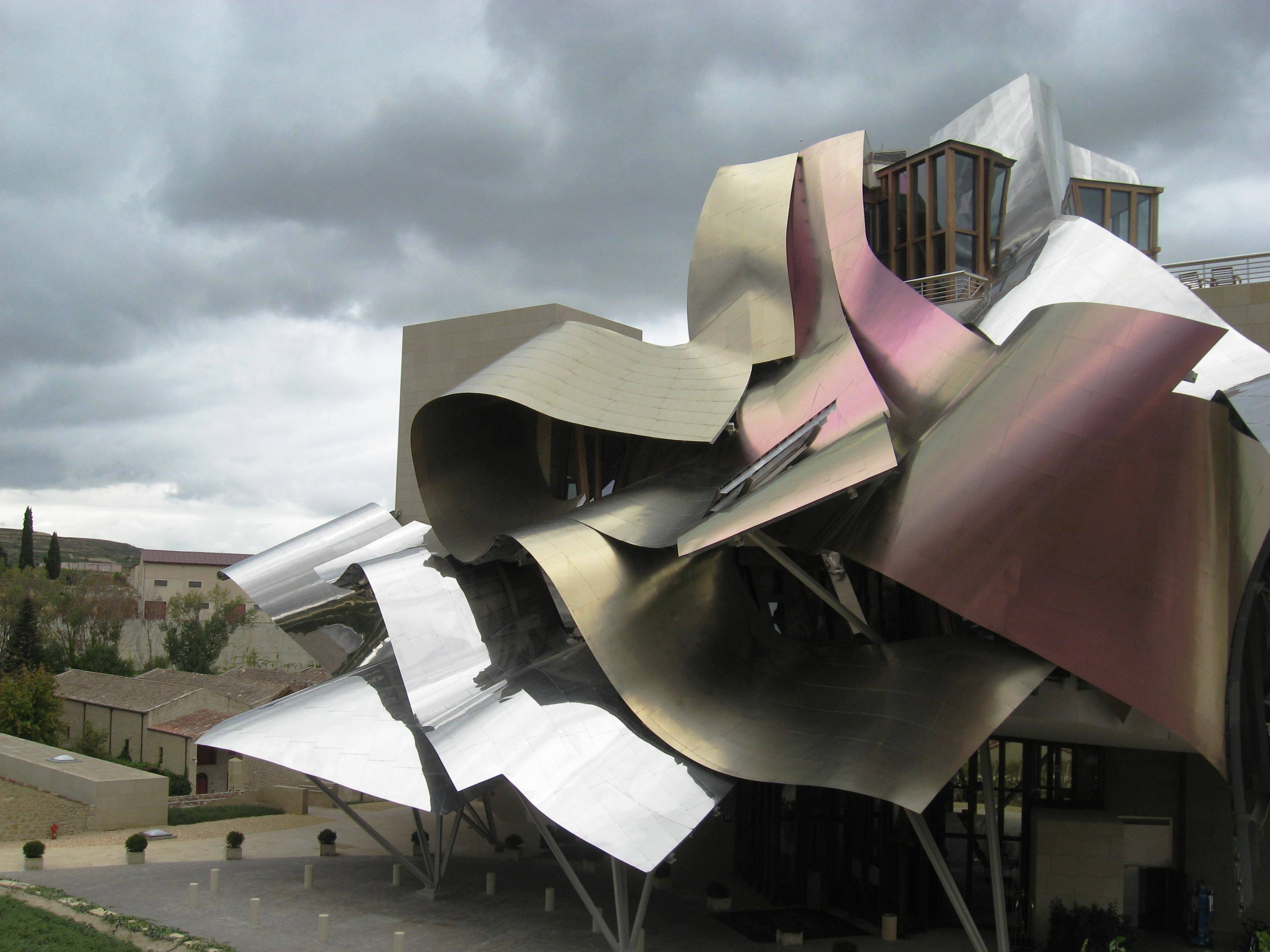
Hotel Marqués de Riscal

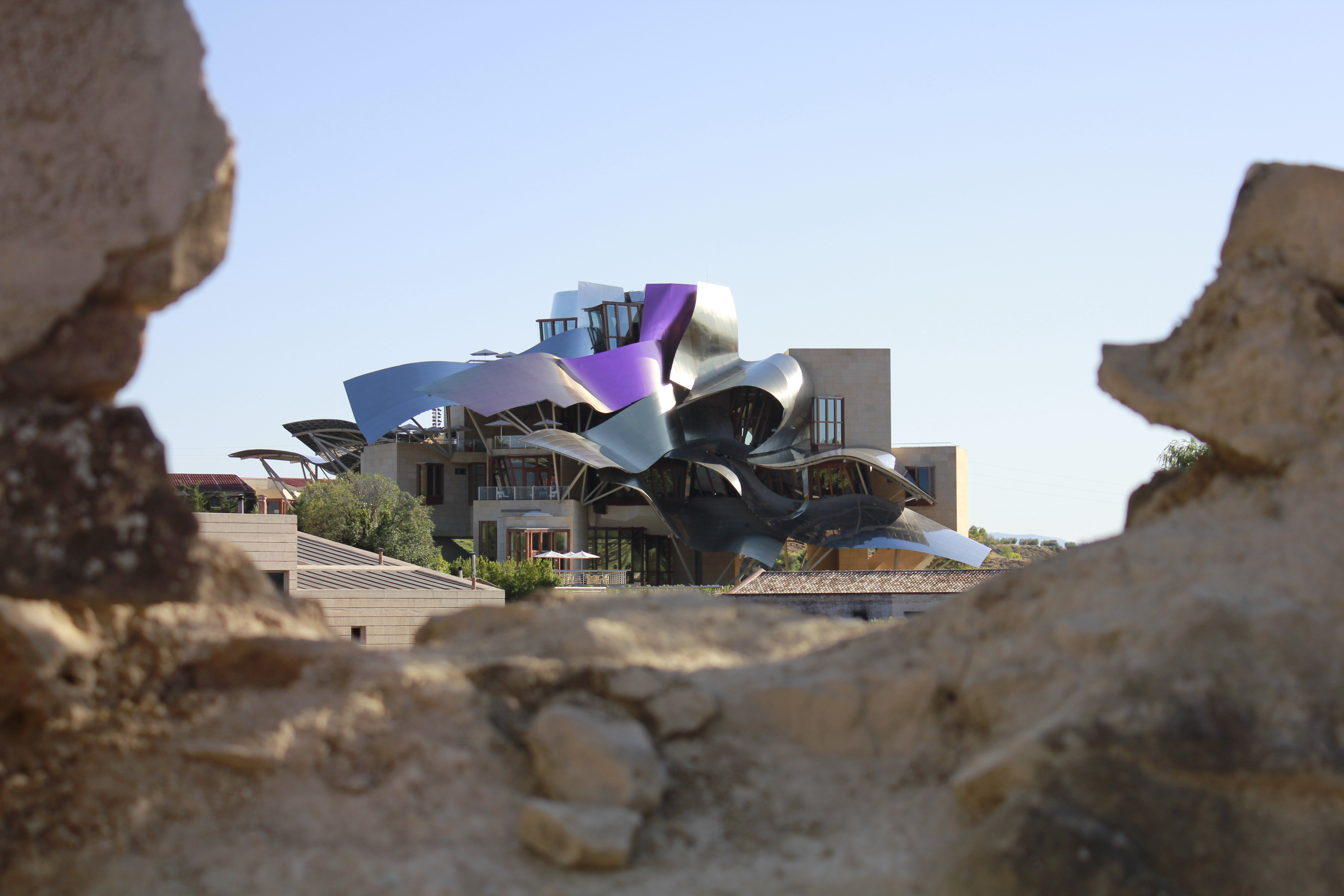
Bodegas Marqués de Riscal
