= La Rioja Alta =

La Rioja Alta, S.A. is a Spanish winery based in Haro, La Rioja. It was founded in 1890 by five local growers: Daniel-Alfredo Ardanza y Sanchez, Saturnina Garcia Cid y Gárete, Dionisio del Prado y Lablanca, Felipe Puig de la Bellacasa y Herrán, and Mariano Lacorte Tapia. In 1904 Alfredo Ardanza merged the group with his own winery. Since then, two of the flagship gran reserva wines of La Rioja Alta have been designated 890 and 904 in honor of those dates, with the first digit omitted to prevent confusion with the vintage year. The Gran Reserva 904 consists of 90% tempranillo and 10% graciano, whereas the Gran Reserva 890 also adds a small amount of mazuelo. In addition to these two wines, La Rioja Alta also produces Viña Ardanza which is a blend of tempranillo with 20% garnacha, and a lighter Viña Arana blended with graciano and mazuelo. The winery currently has 425 hectares of vineyards.
