= Bodegas López de Heredia =

Spanish winery

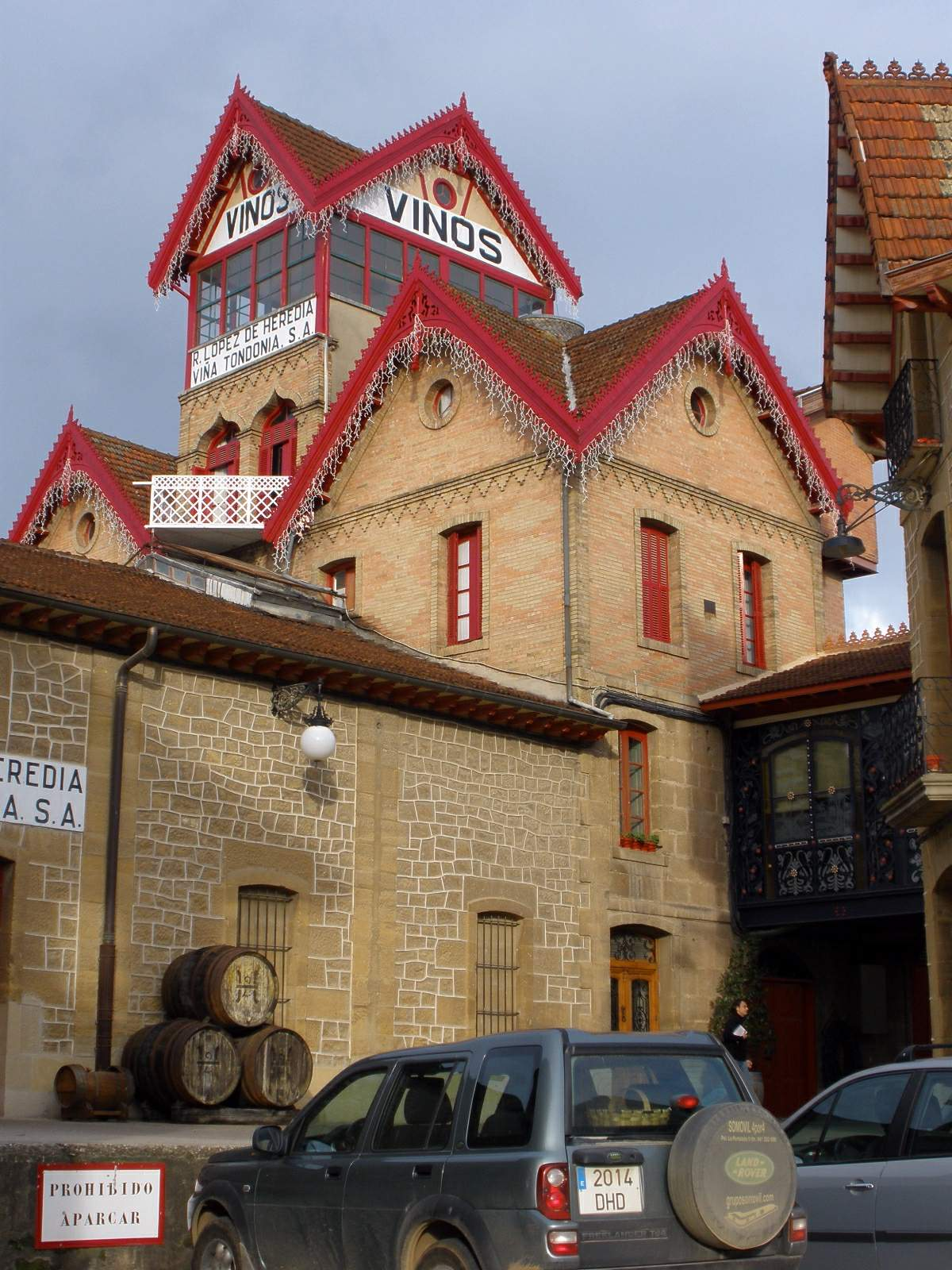
Bodegas López de Heredia Viña Tondonia

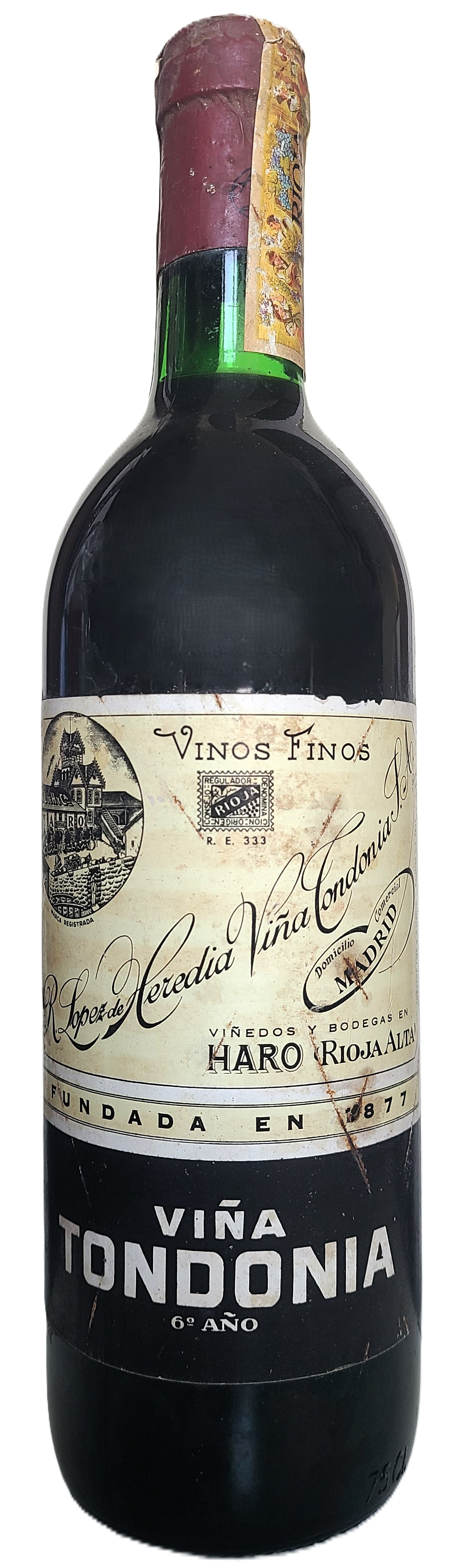
Crianza 6º Año circa 70s

Bodegas López de Heredia is a Spanish winery, located in the Rioja region. Founded in 1877, the estate owns around 420 acres of vineyards and produces 25,000 cases of wine annually. López de Heredia is known as one of Rioja's more traditional winemakers, using large American oak barrels rather than the smaller French ones that many other Rioja wineries have started to use, and often storing and aging its wines—including white wines—for decades before release, much longer than the minimum requirements for Reserva and Gran Reserva wines.

The entry of the showroom was created by Zaha Hadid as a symbol of a wine decanter in 2006.

The wine range from López de Heredia consists of:

- Viña Tondonia, red, white and rosé wines
- Viña Bosconia, red wines
- Viña Cubillo, red wine (Crianza only)
- Viña Gravonia, white wine (Crianza only)
