= Bodegas Muga =

Spanish winery

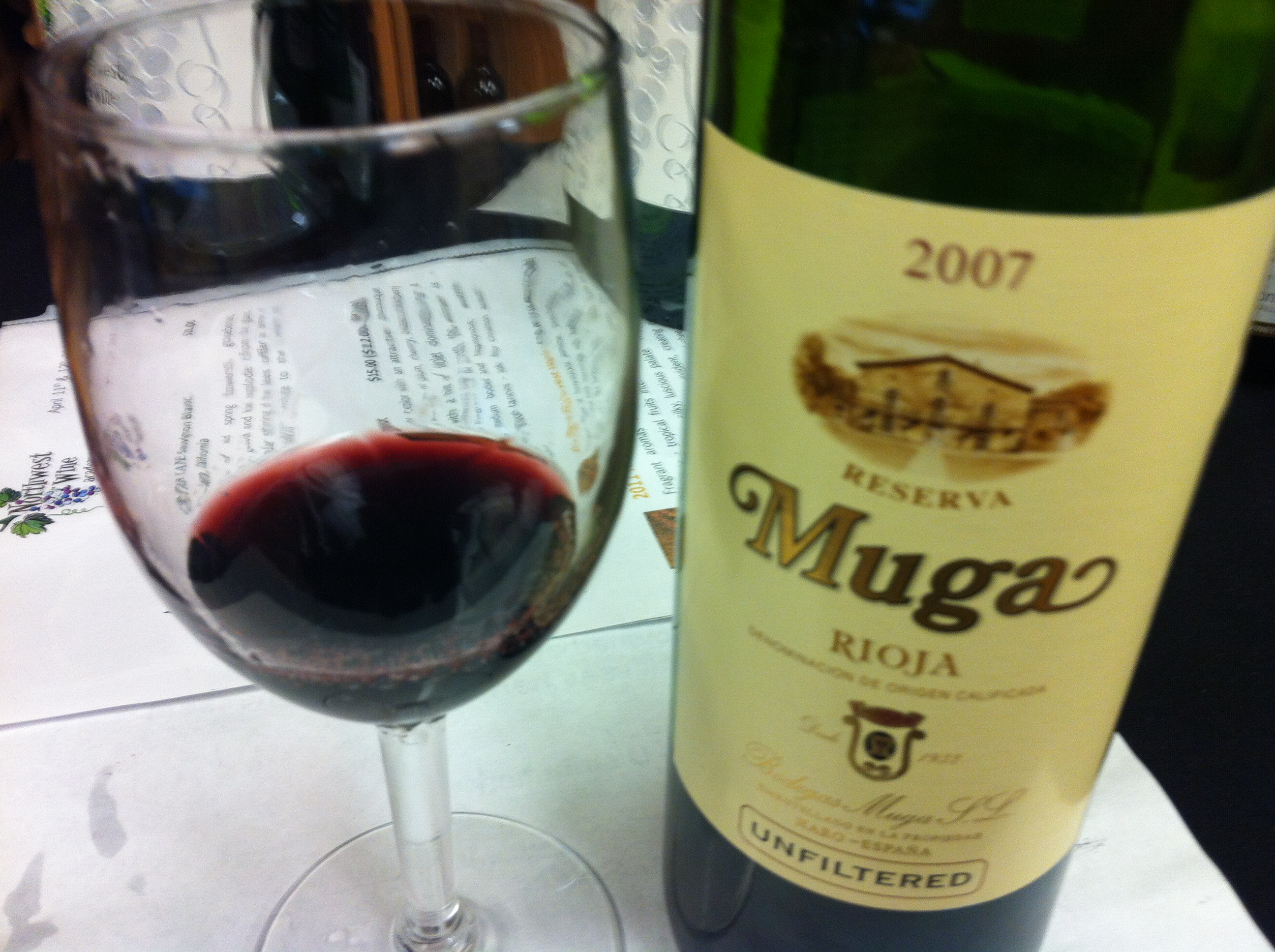
Muga's "unfiltered" Rioja.

Bodegas Muga is a Spanish winery based in Haro, in the Rioja Alta region. The estate was created in 1932 by Isaac Muga Martínez and his wife, Aurora Caño, and currently produces several red, rosé and white wines from Tempranillo, Garnacha, Mazuelo, Malvasia and Viura grapes.
