= Collioure AOC =

French wine area

Coordinates: 42°31′36″N 3°04′53″E

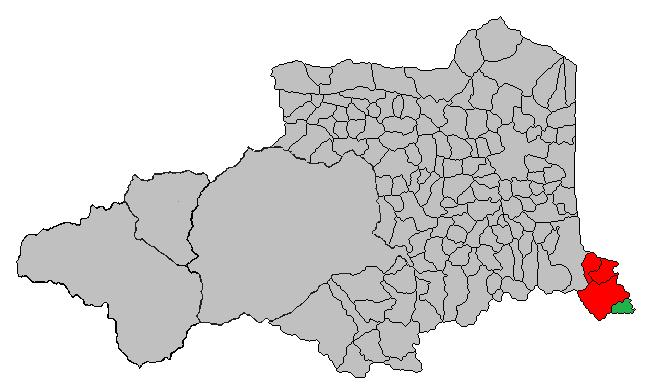
The commune of Collioure (highlighted in green) within the Banyuls AOC in the Roussillon wine region of France.

Collioure (French pronunciation: [kɔljuʁ]) is an Appellation d'Origine Contrôlée (AOC) for French wines situated around the town of Collioure in the Roussillon wine region of France. Red, rosé and a few white wines are produced-the reds from Grenache noir, Mourvèdre, Syrah, Carignan and Cinsaut grapes; the white are made from a blend of Grenache blanc and Grenache gris. The boundaries of the AOC are identical with the Banyuls AOC as many of the grapes grown in Collioure are destined for use in the fortified Vins doux naturels of the region. The grapes that do not get used for Banyuls are then produced as non-fortified still wines under the Collioure AOC.

== History ==
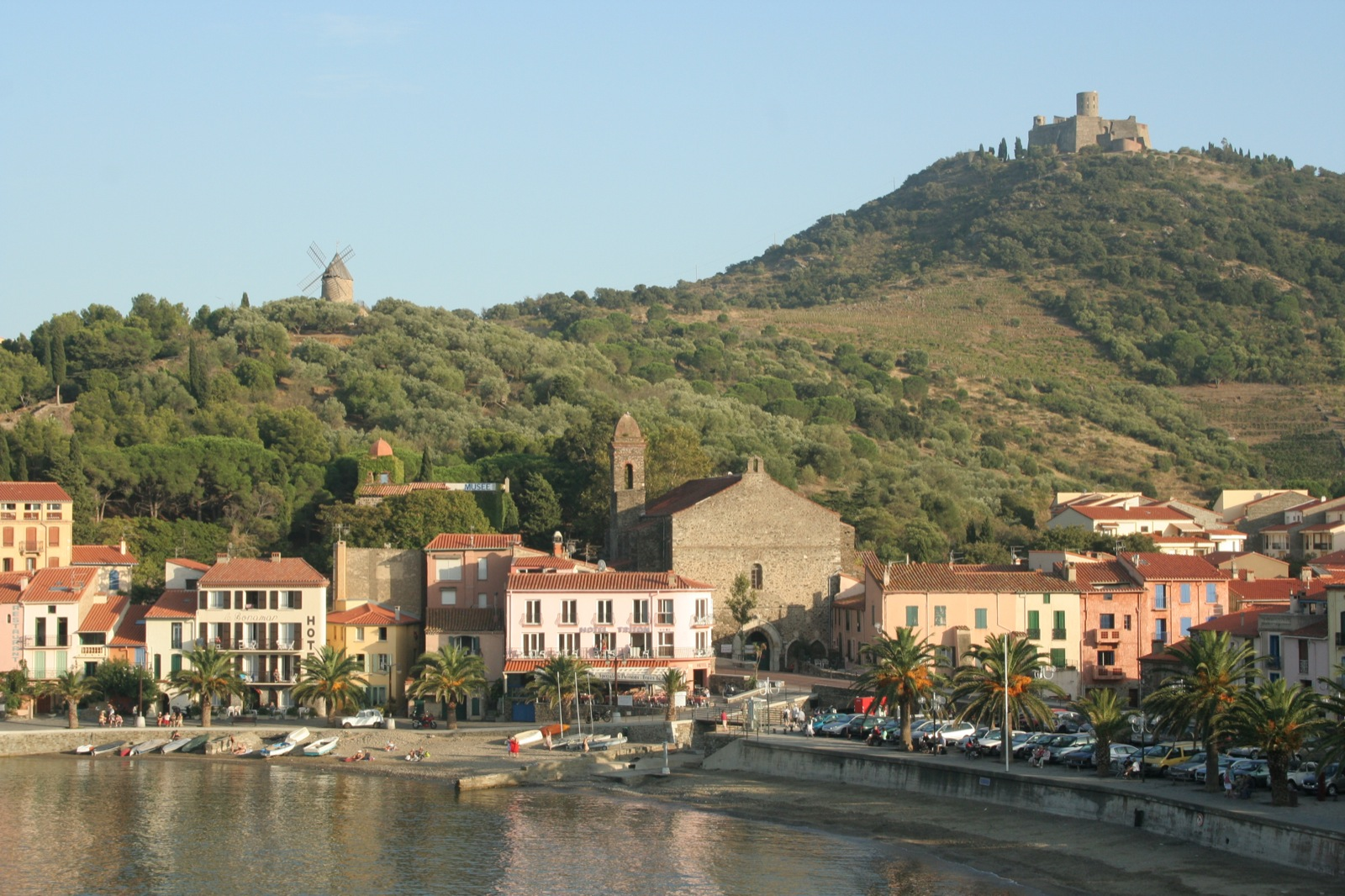
The seaside port of Collioure.

Viticulture was likely introduced to the area soon after the ancient Greeks introduced winemaking to the Languedoc area in the 6th century BC. Under the Romans, viticulture spread throughout the area with the nearby cities of Narbonne, Carcassonne and Perpignan being major centers for the trade of Roussillon wine from areas like Collioure. For a large part of its history, the region has been under Spanish rule and was even a part of the Catalonia region until the mid-17th century. Like other Roussillon wine regions, this Spanish influence can be seen in the types of wines produced here. Even today, wine experts such as Hugh Johnson and Jancis Robinson describe the wines of Collioure as being more like Spanish wines in profile than French.

The history of the Collioure region has been closely linked to the wines of Banyuls. For centuries, grapes produced in this region were used to produce the fortified wine that gained an international reputation. It wasn't until 1971 that the region gained its own identity with an AOC established for the production of non-fortified red wines.

== Climate and geography ==
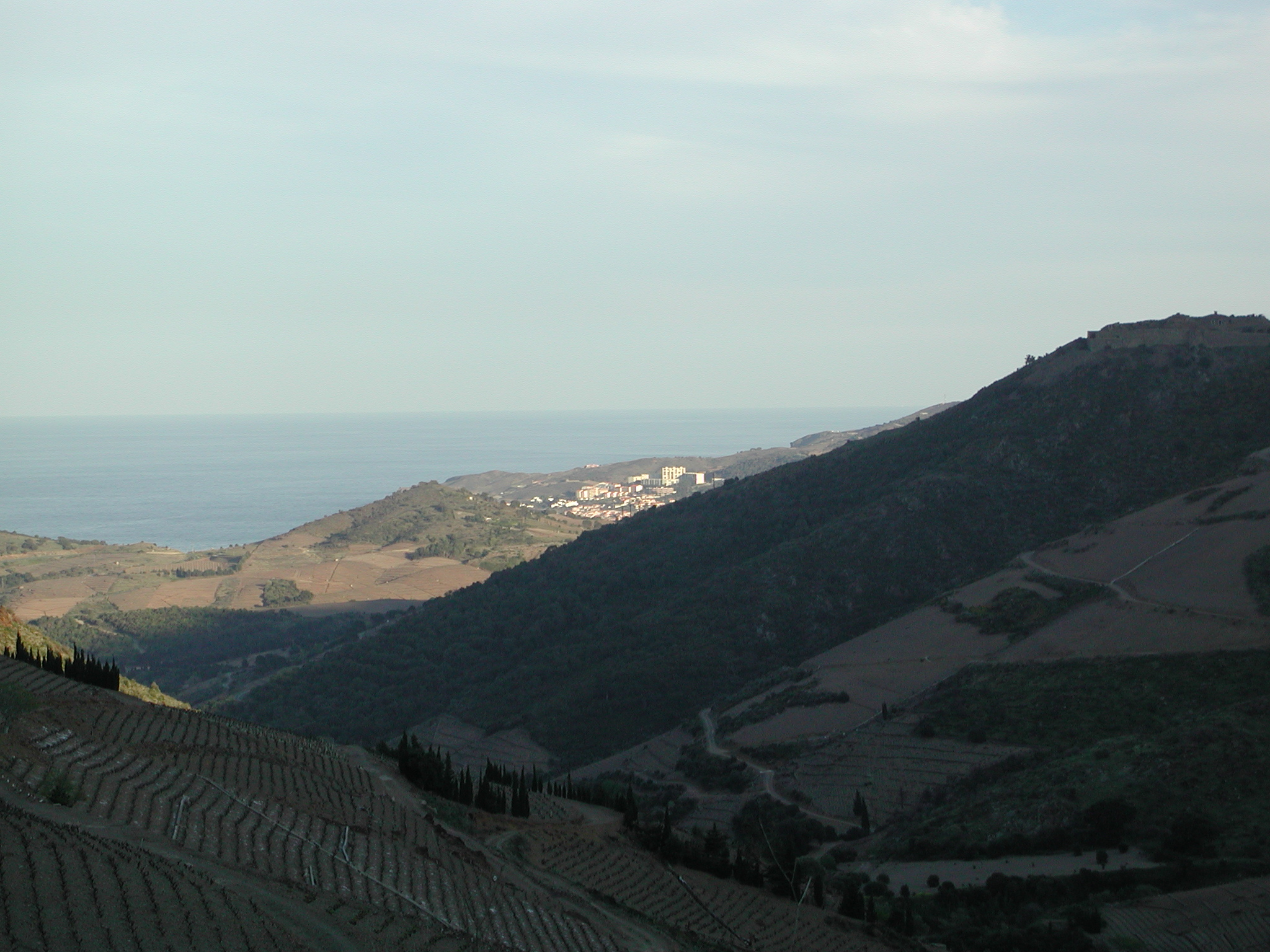
The vineyard soils in the Banyuls and Collioure zones vary from more alluvial soils near the coast to more schist-based soils in the foothills of the Pyrenees.

The Collioure wine region is located along the Mediterranean coast in the Roussillon district, extending from the coast up to the foothills of the Pyrenees which separates the area from the Spanish wine region of Catalonia across the border. Both the mountains and the sea have strong influences on the region's distinctly Mediterranean climate. During the summer growing season, temperatures are very warm and dry with the potential for drought. In the evening, cool winds from the mountains descend over the vineyards and this can help moderate temperatures for the vines.

Vineyard soils in the area range from alluvial soils near the sea and rivers to more gravel, limestone and schist based soils closer to the foothills of the Pyrenees. The soil types will affect the resulting style of wine with the more schist-based soils on the higher slopes of the foothills producing more intense, full bodied wines while the more alluvial soils closer to the sea will produce lighter styles of wine.

== Viticulture and winemaking ==
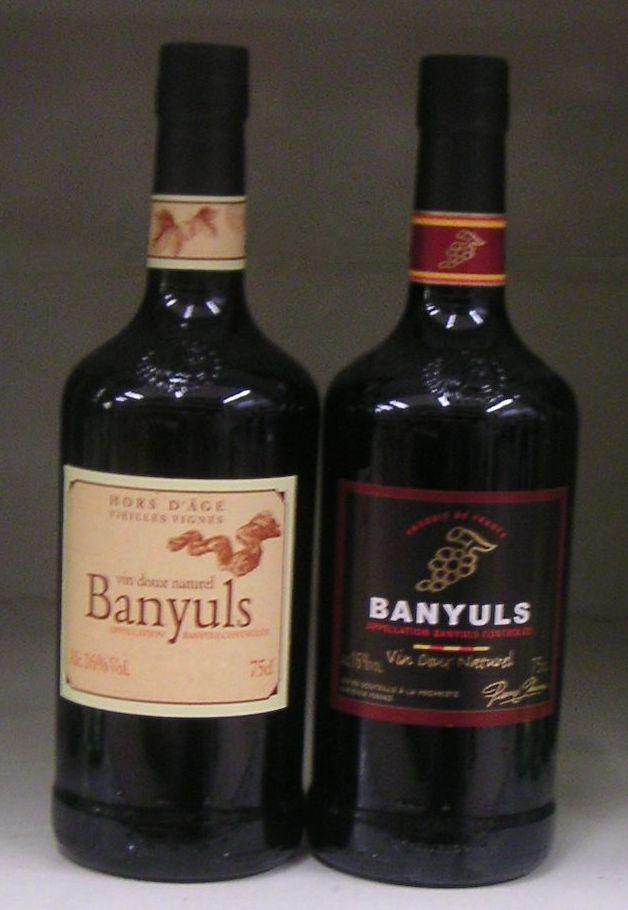
Grapes from Collioure are often used in the production of the fortified wine Banyuls.

Many producers in Collioure also produce wines under the Banyuls label, which tends to have more prestige and fetch a higher price on the international wine market. The nature of the vintage will usually determine what percentage of Collioure grapes are used for Banyuls and what percentage will remain Collioure. When grapes are destined to become Collioure they are usually harvested a couple of weeks earlier than the grapes that are destined to be fortified. This is because the warm climate of the region causes grape sugars to rise as acids in the grapes drastically fall. While fortified wines value the high percentage of residual sugar from very ripe grapes, non-fortified wines need more of the balance from the remaining acids. Often, though, winemakers will still need to add additional acids such as tartaric acid in a process known as acidification. In a typical vintage about one-third of the grapes harvested in the region will be used for Collioure AOC labeled wines.

Grapevines in Collioure are trained as "bush vines" which, along with their age, contributes to the very low yields of Collioure. In fact, the yields from this area are often among the lowest in France - often lower than the AOC maximum of 2.3 tones per acre (40 hectoliters per hectare). Wines produced in Collioure also must not rise above a maximum alcohol level of 15% (min 12% for red, 11.5% for rose and whites)and residual sugar level of 5 grams per liter. This low sugar levels means that all wines from Collioure are technically dry wines but wine drinkers they may perceive "sweetness" due to the very high levels of ripeness the grapes attain in the warm climate of the region.

== Grapes and the Wine made in Collioure ==
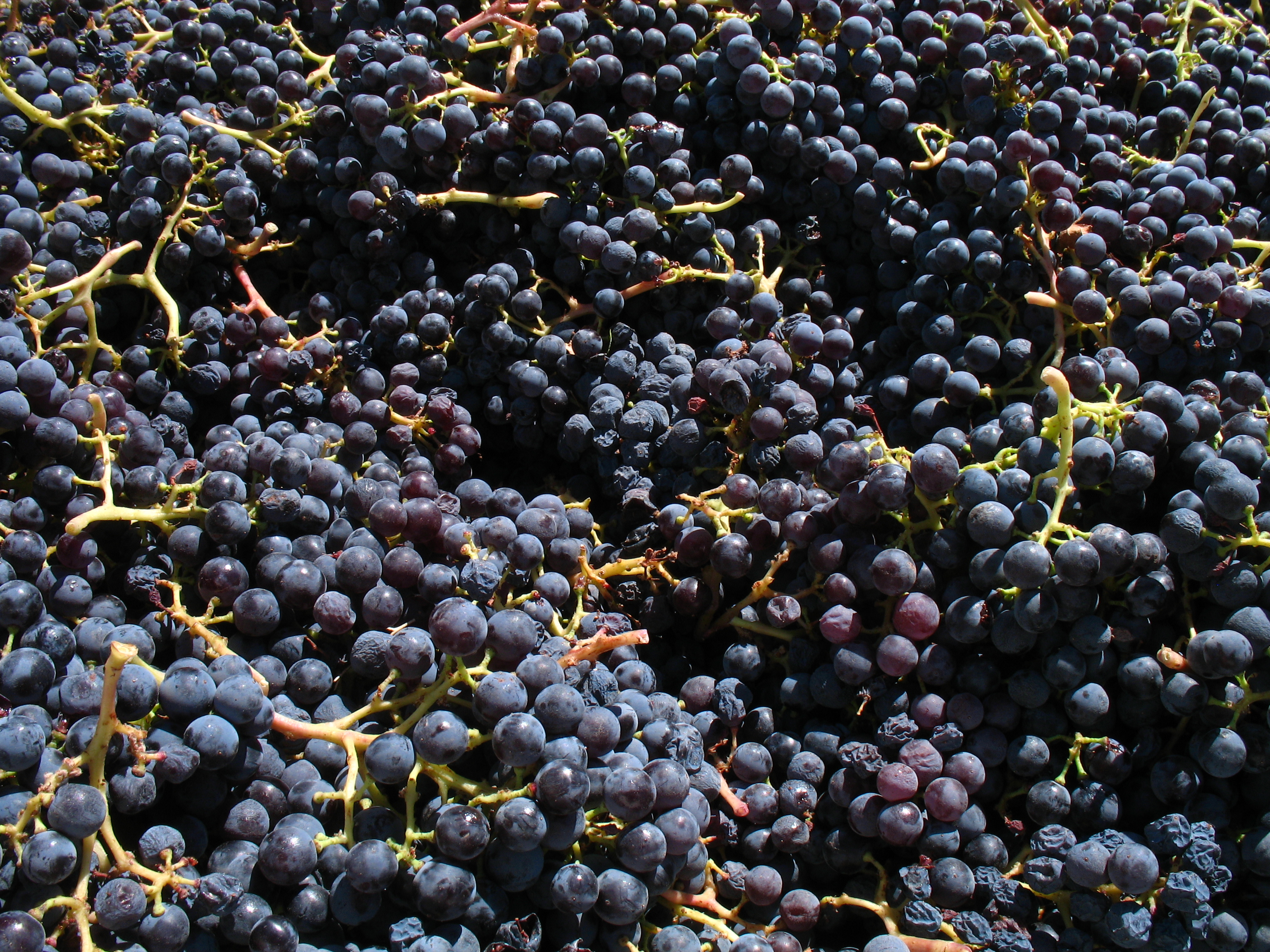
Grenache is one of the principal grapes grown in the Collioure AOC.

The primary grapes of the Collioure AOC are Grenache, Syrah and Mourvedre with Carignan and Cinsaut playing minor roles. The Mourvedre planted in Collioure is used almost exclusively for still wine production and is very rarely used in the production of Banyuls. The rose is produced mainly from the red wine grapes that have received very brief skin contact and maceration time or it maybe produced from a saignée method where some wine is "bleed off" from the fermenting vats of red wines before much of the color inducing phenolic compounds have taken hold. This method produces a more intensely flavored and darker colored red wine while at the same time producing a high quality rose. The whites are usually made from Grenache blanc. The red wines of the region are characterized by their rich, full bodied flavors with spice aroma notes.

As of 2008, there were an estimated 815 acres (330 hectares) of vineyards planted in the boundaries of the Collioure AOC. In 2002, the encépagement (or permitted grape components of the AOC wine) was changed which included permitting an AOC white wine for the first time. Today wines labeled Collioure AOC must contain at least a 60% blend of Grenache, Syrah and Mourvedre with no individual grape variety permitted to exceed 90% of the total blend. Cinsault and Carignan are allowed to up to a maximum of 30%. Prior to the 2002 AOC change, white wines produced from grapes grown in the Collioure region had to be sold as a vin de Pays. Today the AOC white blend must contain a minimum of 70% blend of Grenache blanc and Grenache gris with Macabeo, Malvoisie, Marsanne, Roussanne and Vermentino permitted to round out the remaining portion of the blend - though each of those grape varieties can not individually exceed 15%.

Over the years, the quality of wines produced in the Collioure AOC has steadily increased. Wine experts, such as Andre Domine point to the 1982 encépagement change that permitted the use of Syrah and Mourvedre as a turning point. Modern winemaking techniques have also introduced temperature-controlled fermentation and increased the usage of oak barrels for the aging of wine. The most well made reds of Collioure are described as having polished (or "soft") tannins, a full bodied and deep dark color with spicy aroma and flavor notes. The roses of the region can be very aromatic and usually have a raspberry color. They are traditionally paired with the local seafood. The whites can have a golden color and be very full bodied. They are usually consumed within 3 years of harvest.

== See also ==
- List of appellations in Languedoc-Roussillon
