= Minervois AOC =

French wine region

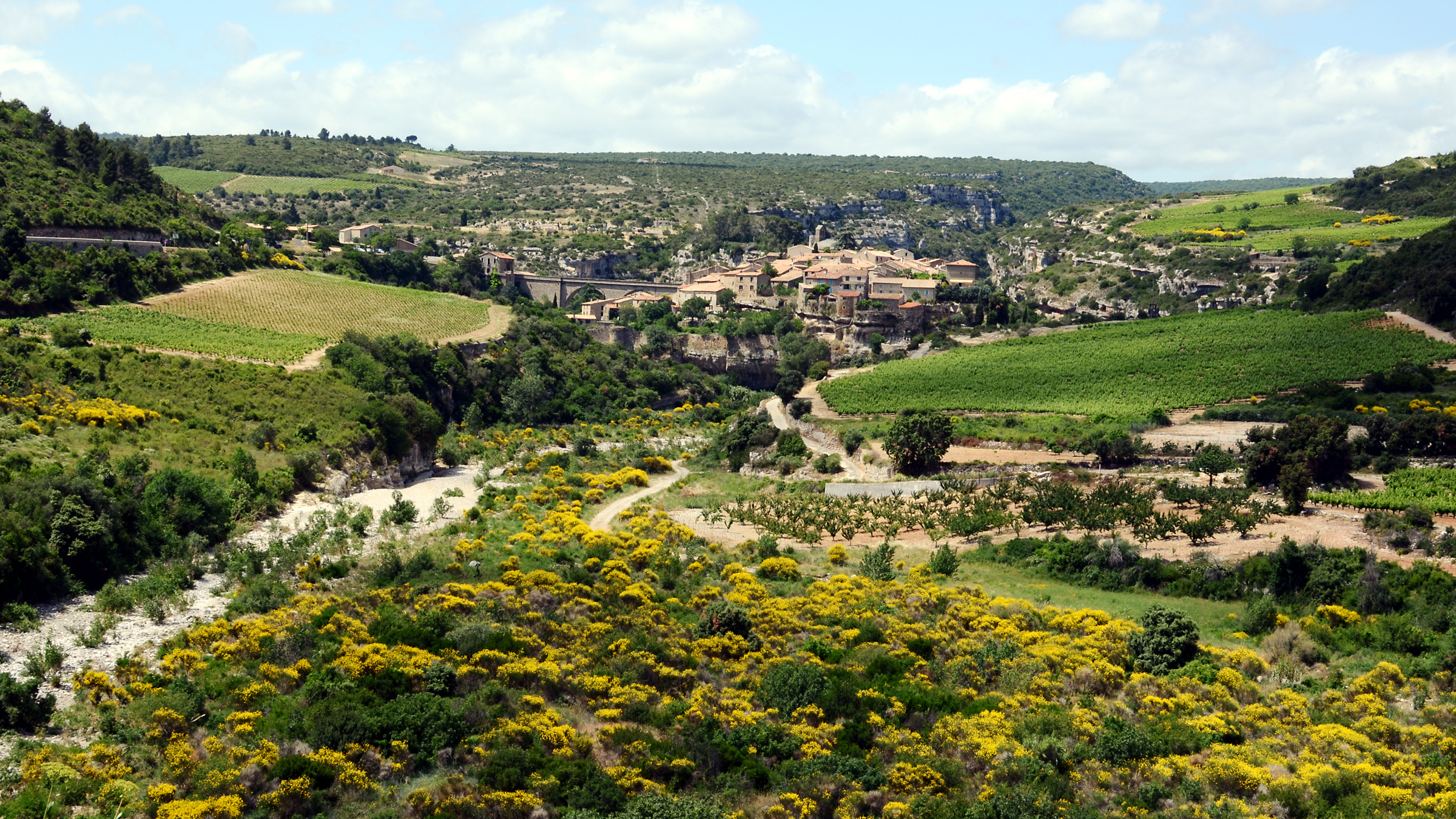
Winegrowing in Minerve

Minervois (French pronunciation: [minɛʁvwa]) is an appellation d'origine contrôlée (AOC) in the Languedoc-Roussillon wine region, in the departments of the Aude and of the Hérault. Historically, the region's capital has been the village of Minerve.

AOC regulations require the wine to be blended (at least 2 varieties), so pure varietal wines must be vin de pays. The red wines of the Minervois appellation are produced from Syrah and Mourvedre, Grenache and Lladoner Pelut (minimum 60%); and Carignan, Cinsault, Piquepoul, Terret, and Rivairenc (maximum 40%). In any case Syrah and Mourvedre needs to be at least 20% of total, and Piquepoul, Terret, and Rivairenc needs to be no more than 10%.

The white wines, which are less commonly found, may include Marsanne, Roussanne, Maccabeu, Bourboulenc, Clairette, Grenache, Vermentino, Piquepoul and Muscat Blanc a Petits Grains.

== See also ==
- List of Vins de Primeur
- List of appellations in Languedoc-Roussillon
