= List of appellations in Languedoc-Roussillon =

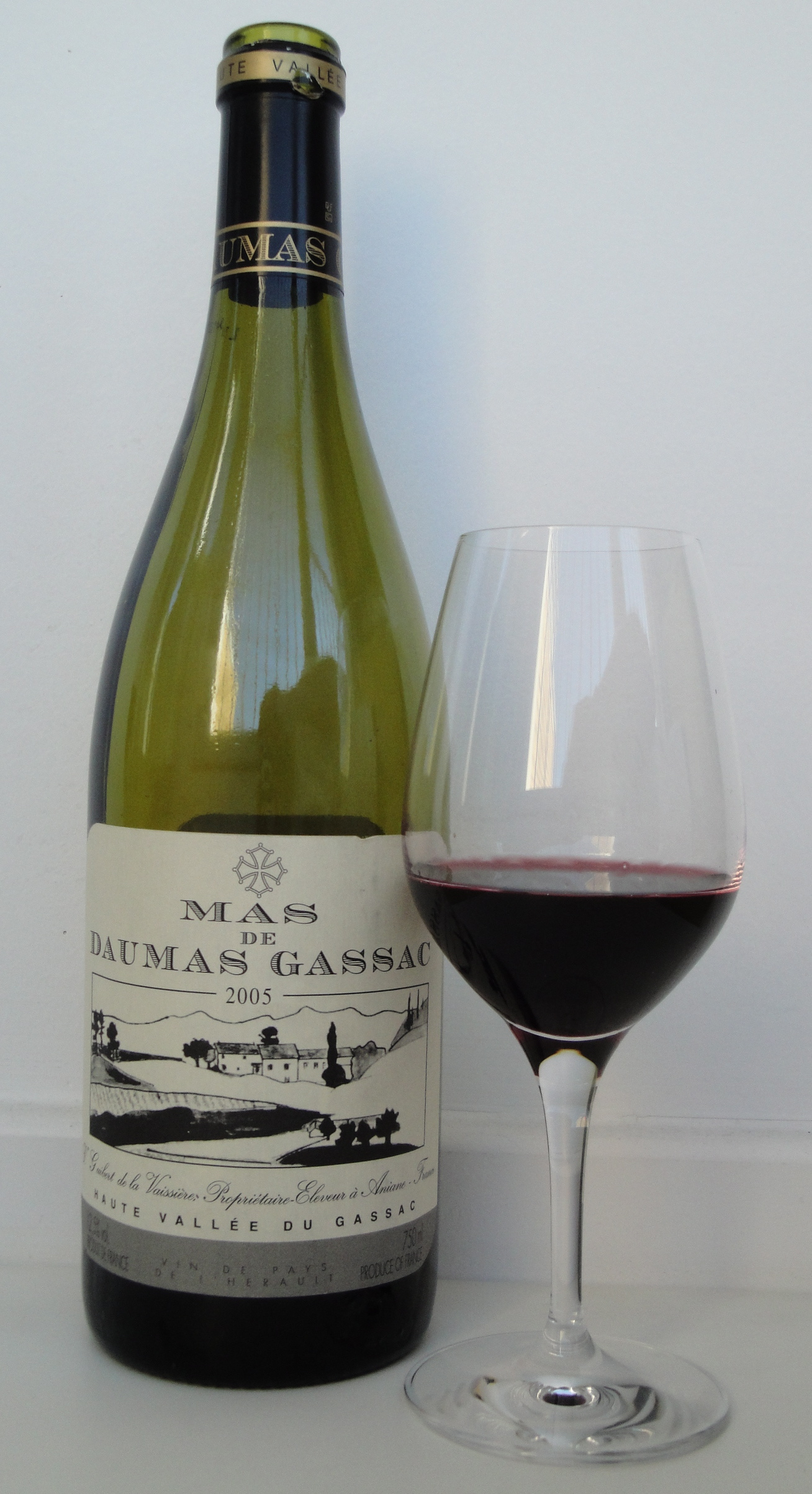
Mas de Daumas Gassac, Coteaux du Languedoc

The AOCs for Languedoc-Roussillon wine include:

== Eastern Languedoc ==
- Berlou – Red wines
- Clairette de Bellegarde (fr)
- Clairette de Languedoc
- Coteaux du Languedoc – Red wine, White wine, Rosé
- Coteaux du Languedoc Pic Saint Loup
- Costières de Nîmes – Red wine. According to some sources, this appellation is now considered a part of Rhône rather than Languedoc.
- Faugères – Red wine
- Muscat de Frontignan – White wine, Fortified wine
- Muscat de Lunel
- Muscat de Mireval
- Roquebrun – Red wines
- Saint-Chinian – Red, White and Rosé wines
- Terrasses du Larzac - Red wines

== Western Languedoc ==
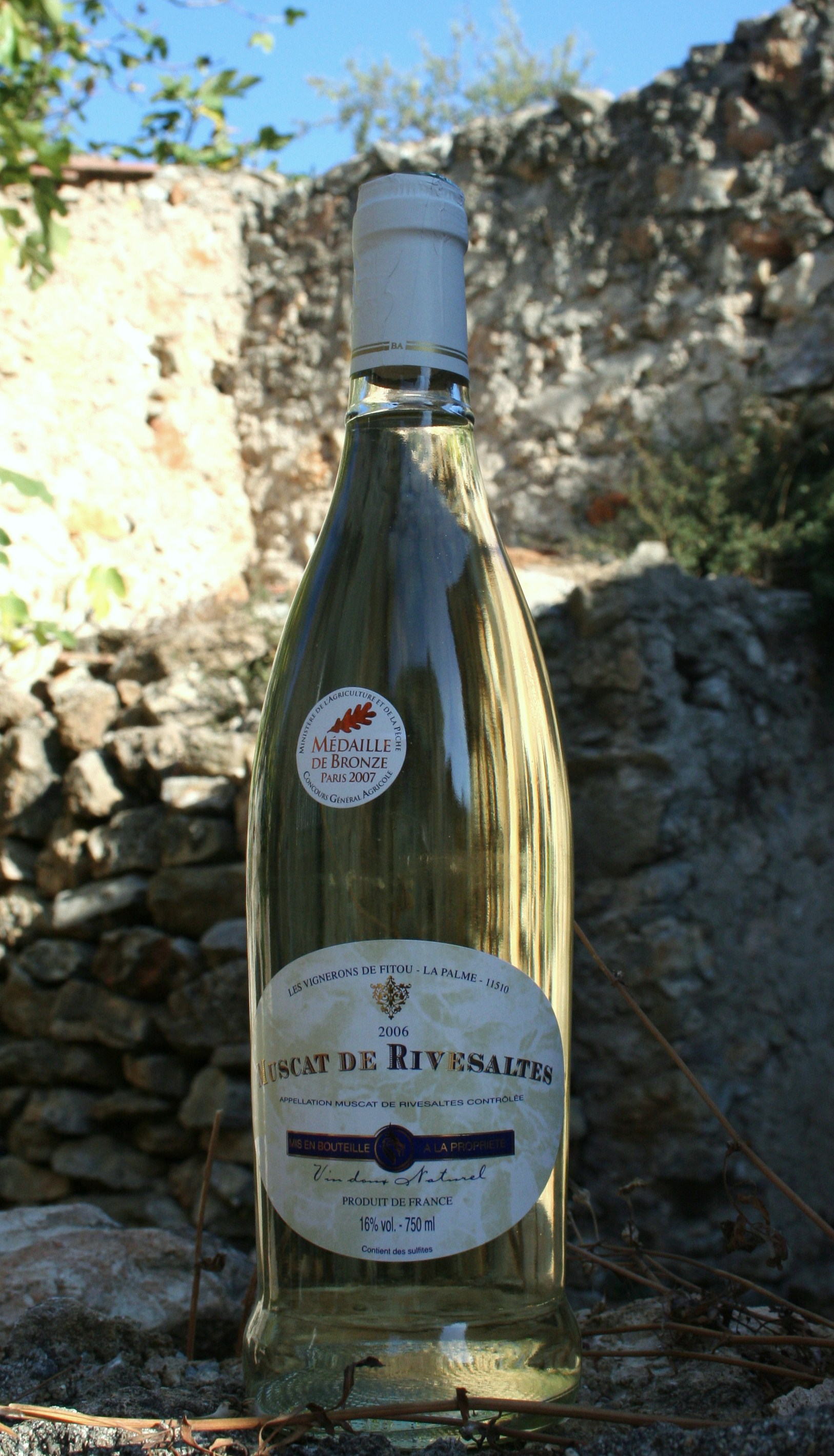
Muscat de Rivesaltes AOC

- Cabardès – Red wine, Rosé wine
- Côtes de Malepère – Red wine
- Corbières – Red wine
- Coteaux du Languedoc
- Fitou – Red wine
- La Clape
- Limoux AOC – White wine, Sparkling wine
- Minervois – Red wine
- Minervois La Liviniere – Red wine
- Muscat de St-Jean-de-Minervois – White wine, Fortified wine
- Rivesaltes

== Roussillon ==
- Banyuls Grand Cru – Red wine, Fortified wine
- Banyuls – Red wine, Fortified wine
- Collioure – White wine, Red wine
- Côtes du Roussillon
- Côtes du Roussillon Les Aspres
- Côtes du Roussillon-Villages – Red wine
- Côtes du Roussillon-Villages Caramany
- Côtes du Roussillon-Villages Lesquerde
- Côtes du Roussillon-Villages Latour de France
- Côtes du Roussillon-Villages Tautavel
- Maury – White wine, Red wine
- Muscat de Rivesaltes – White wine, Fortified wine
- Rivesaltes – White wine, Red wine

== Indication Géographique Protégée ==
Some of these wines were referred to as Vins de Pays prior to 2009.

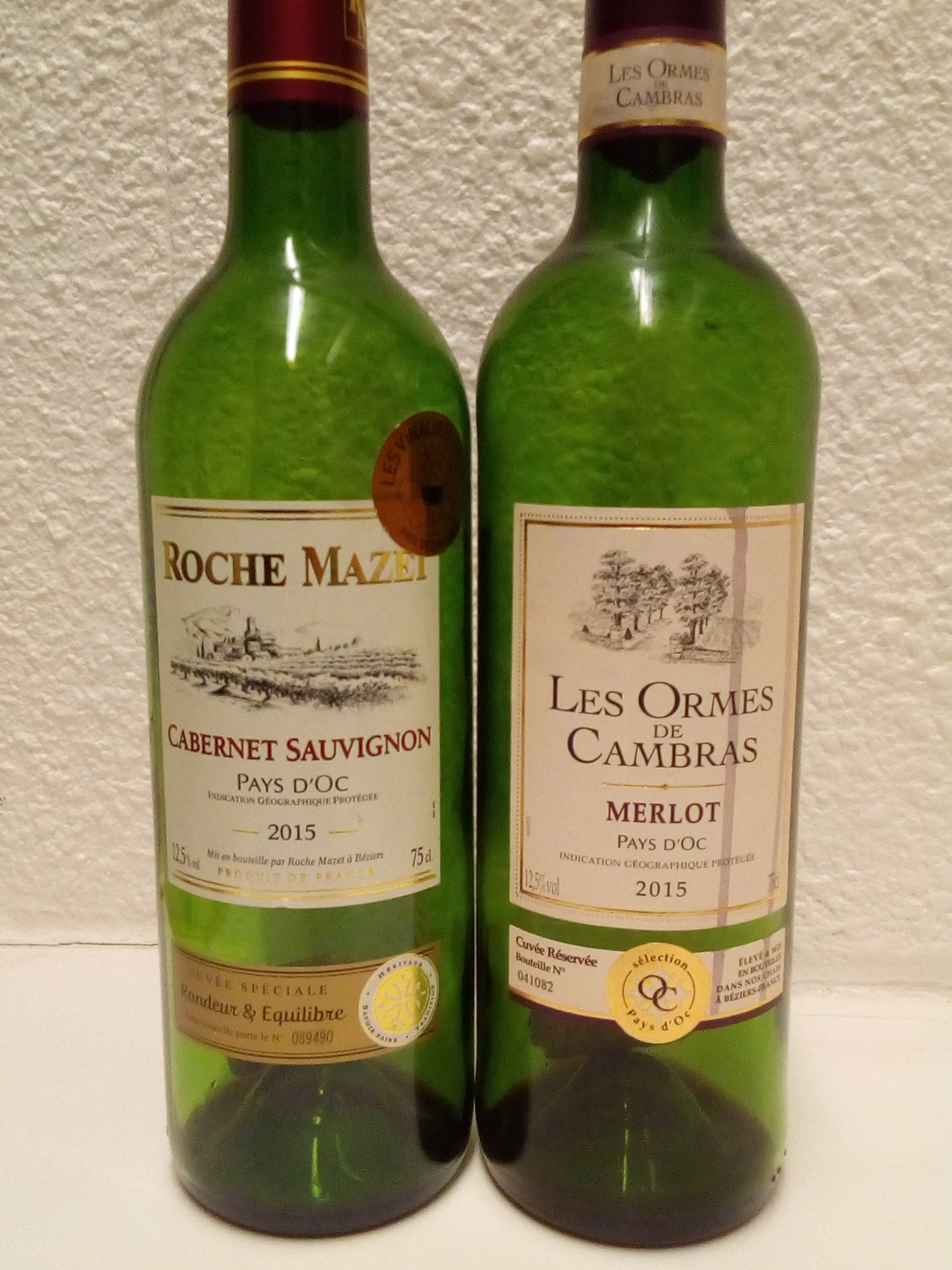
IGP-labeled wine bottles

- Bessan
- Bérange
- Cassan
- Catalan wine
- Caux
- Cessnon
- Cévennes
- Côtes Catalanes
- Côtes de Lastours
- Côtes de Pérignan
- Côtes de Prouille
- Côtes de Thau
- Côtes de Thongue
- Côtes du Céressou
- Côtes du Vidourle
- Côtes du Brian
- Collines de la Moure
- Coteau du Libron
- Coteaux d'Enserune
- Coteaux de Béssilles
- Coteaux de Cèze
- Coteaux de Fenouillèdes
- Coteaux de Fontcaude
- Coteaux de la Cabrerisse
- Coteaux de Laurens
- Coyeaux de Miramount
- Coteaux de Murviel
- Coteaux de Narbonne
- Coteaux de Peyriac
- Coteaux du Littoral Audois
- Coteaux du Pont du Gard
- Coteaux du Salagou
- Coteaux Flaviens
- Duché d'Uzès
- Gorges de l'Hérault
- Hauterive
- Hauts-de-Badens
- L'Ardailbou
- La Bénovie
- La Cite de Carcassonne
- La Côte Vermeille
- La Haude Vallée de l'Aude
- La Haute Vallée de l'Orb
- La Vallée du Paradis
- La Vaunage
- La Vicomté d'Aumelas
- La Vistrenque
- Mont-Baudile
- Monts de la Grage
- Pays du Torgan
- Petite Crau
- Pézenas
- Principauté d'Orange
- Sables du Golfe du Lion
- Val de Cesse
- Val de Dagne
- Val de Montferrand
- Vals d'Agly

== See also ==
- Languedoc wine
- List of wine producing regions
- Polyphenols in wine
- Varietal
- Wine accessory
- Wine grapes
