= Yecla (DO) =

Coordinates: 38°37′00″N 1°07′00″W

Yecla DOP
- Wine region
- Yecla DOP in the region of Murcia
- Official name: D.O.P. Yecla
- Type: Denominación de Origen Protegida (DOP)
- Year established: 1975
- Country: Spain
- Size of planted vineyards: 4,830 hectares (11,935 acres)
- Wine produced: 82,791 hectolitres
- Comments: Data for 2016 / 2017

Yecla is a Spanish Denominación de Origen Protegida (DOP) for wines located around the town of Yecla in the northernmost corner of the region of Murcia (Spain) and is surrounded by other DOPs: Jumilla to the south and west, Almansa to the north and Alicante to the east. The area is notable for its extensive use of the red Monastrell grape variety, and it is traditionally known as the home of Monastrell in Spain. Monastrell is the fourth most planted red grape variety in Spain. The international market makes up 92% of the DOP's wine sales, making it the Spanish wine DOP with the highest proportion of international exports.

== History ==
Findings from archaeological excavations in the area have confirmed that grape growing and wine production has been practiced in this area for over 2000 years and was probably introduced by the ancient Romans. There was a period of expansion at the end of the 19th century when French wine merchants became involved in the region due to the effects of the Great French Wine Blight. Official DO status was acquired in 1975.

== Geography ==
The vineyards covered by Yecla DOP are located in a transition zone between the Mediterranean and the central upland plateaux known as La Mancha, at altitudes ranging from 400 to 800 metres (1,300 to 2,600 ft) above sea level. The soil is lime bearing, and the subsoil is thick with a high carbonate content. The topsoil is sandy, poor in organic matter, deep with good permeability.

== Climate ==
The climate is Mediterranean-continental, with long, hot dry summers and cold winters. Maximum temperature in summer can reach 39 °C and minimum temperature in winter can be as low as -10 °C. Rainfall is sparse, 400 millimetres (16 in) per year, occurs mainly in autumn and spring, sometimes in the form of violent storms. Sunlight hours high, about 3,000 hours per year.

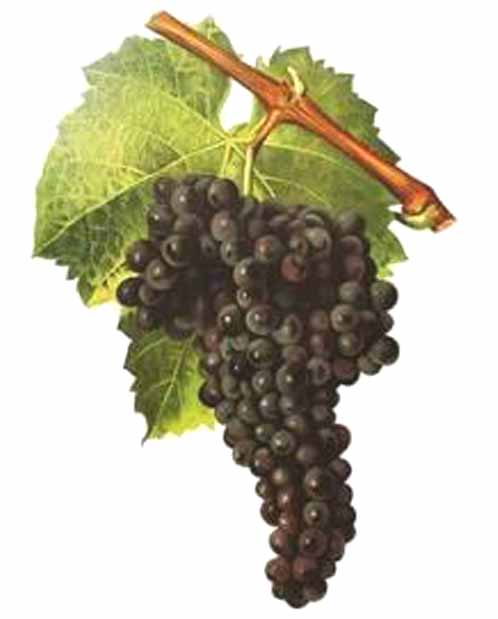
The Monastrell grape

== Grapes ==
The authorised varieties are:

- Red: Monastrell, Garnacha tinta, Garnacha Tintorera, Tempranillo, Merlot, Petit Verdot, Cabernet Sauvignon, and Syrah.
- White: Airén, Merseguera, Macabeo, Moscatel de Grano Menudo, Malvasía, Sauvignon Blanc, and Chardonnay.
