= Retagliado bianco =

Variety of grape

Retagliado bianco is a white Italian wine grape variety that has been growing in Sardinia since at least the late 19th century. Here it is an authorized grape in the Indicazione geografica tipica (IGT) wines of Colli del Limbara where it is usually blended with Vermentino.

== History ==
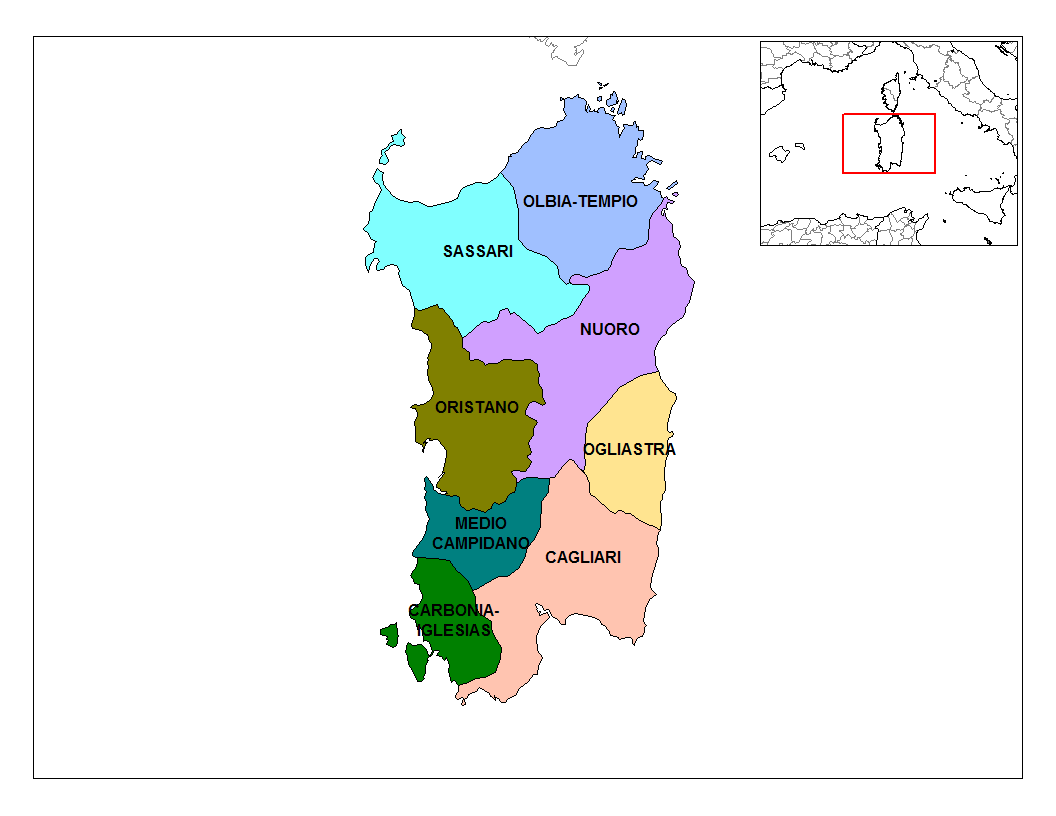
Retagliado bianco has been growing in Sardinia since at least the late 19th century.

The first recorded mention of Retagliado bianco dates to 1877 where the grape was listed as one of the varieties grown in Sardegna (Sardinia). The grape has historically been confused with the Corsican wine grape Brustiano bianco (also known as Licronaxu bianco) that was thought to be extinct until plantings were discovered in Sardinia.

== Viticulture ==
Retagliado bianco is a mid-ripening grape variety that is often harvested in early October.

== Wine regions ==
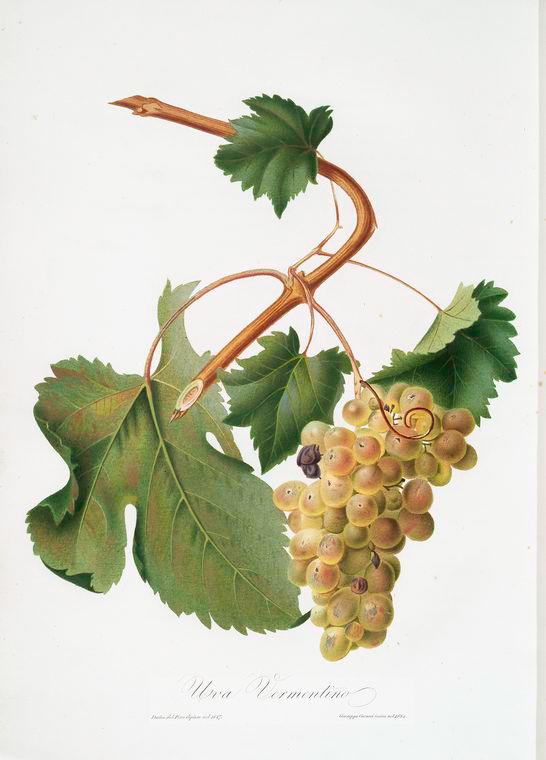
In the wines of the Colli del Limbara IGT, Retagliado bianco is usually blended with Vermentino (pictured).

In 2000, there were 28 hectare (69 acres) of Retagliado bianco growing in Italy, almost exclusively in the provinces of Olbia-Tempio (particularly the Gallura region) and Sassari in Sardinia. Many of the plantings in Sardinia are very old (over 50 years). The grape is an authorized variety for the wines of the Colli del Limbara IGT where it is usually blended with Vermentino.

== Synonyms ==
Over the years Retagliado bianco has been known under a variety of synonyms including: Arba Luxi, Arretallace, Arretallau, Arrosto Portedium, Arrotelas, Bianca Lucente, Bianca Lucida, Co 'e Erbei, Coa de Brebei, Coa de Brebèi, Erba Luxi, Erbaluxi, Mara Bianca, Rechiliau, Redagladu, Redaglàdu, Retagliada, Retagliadu, Retagladu Francese, Retazzadu, Retelau, Retellau, Retigliau, Ritelau, Rittadatu and Rotogliadu.
