= Brustiano bianco =

Variety of grape

Brustiano bianco is a white French wine grape variety from the island of Corsica. The grape was thought to be extinct until DNA testing of vines on nearby Sardinia led to the discovery that the Licronaxu bianco and its color mutation grapevine Licronaxu nero were in fact Brustiano bianco. This discovery has allowed for the grape to be reintroduce to Corsica where it is often blended with Vermentino, Biancu Gentile and Scimiscià.

== Viticulture ==
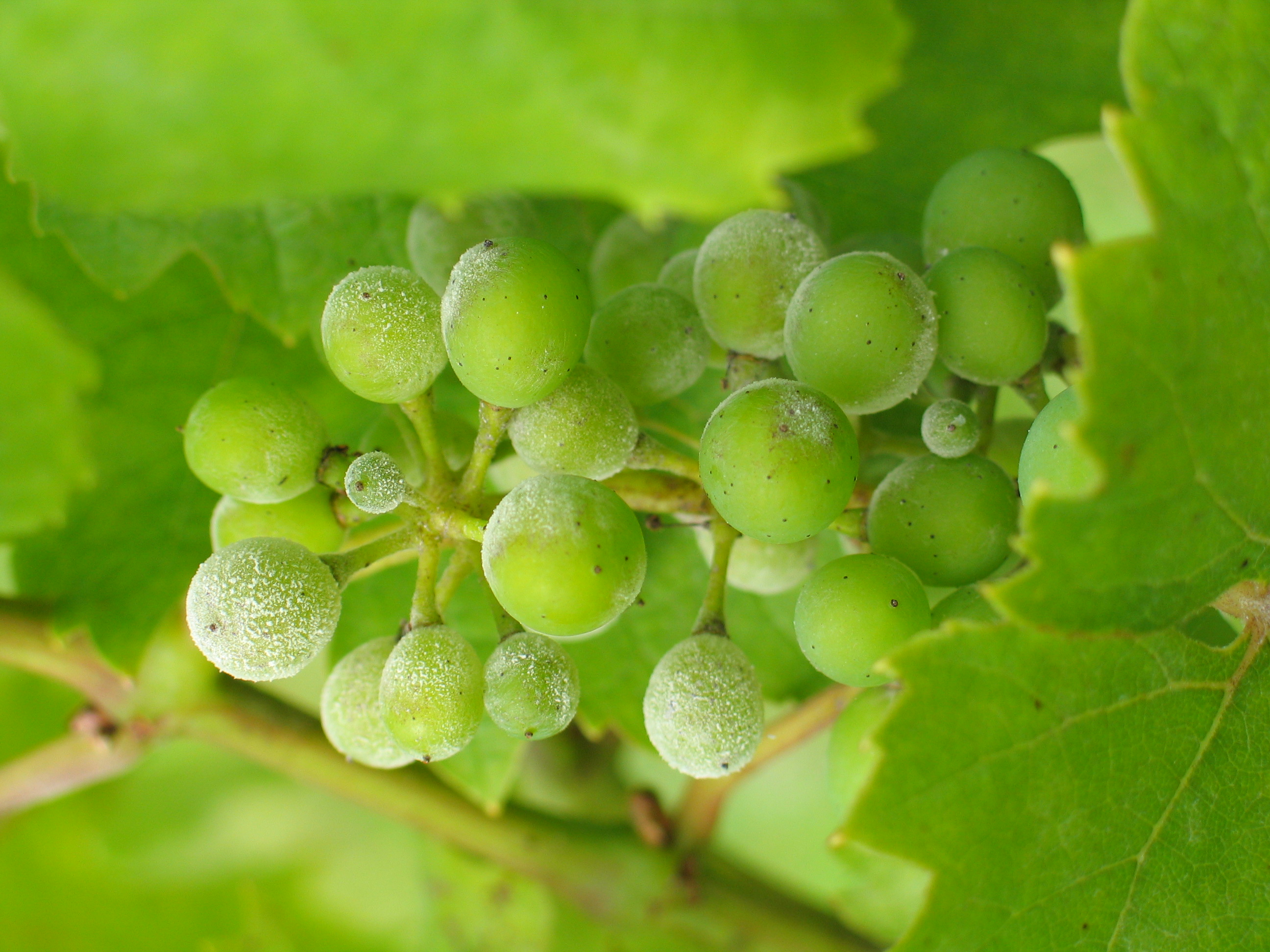
Brustiano bianco is very susceptible to powdery mildew infection by pathogen Uncinula necator (pictured on grapes)

Brustiano bianco is a productive vine that has the potential to be very high yielding if not kept in check by winter pruning or green harvesting. The vine is susceptible to several viticultural hazards including powdery mildew.

== Relationship with other varieties ==
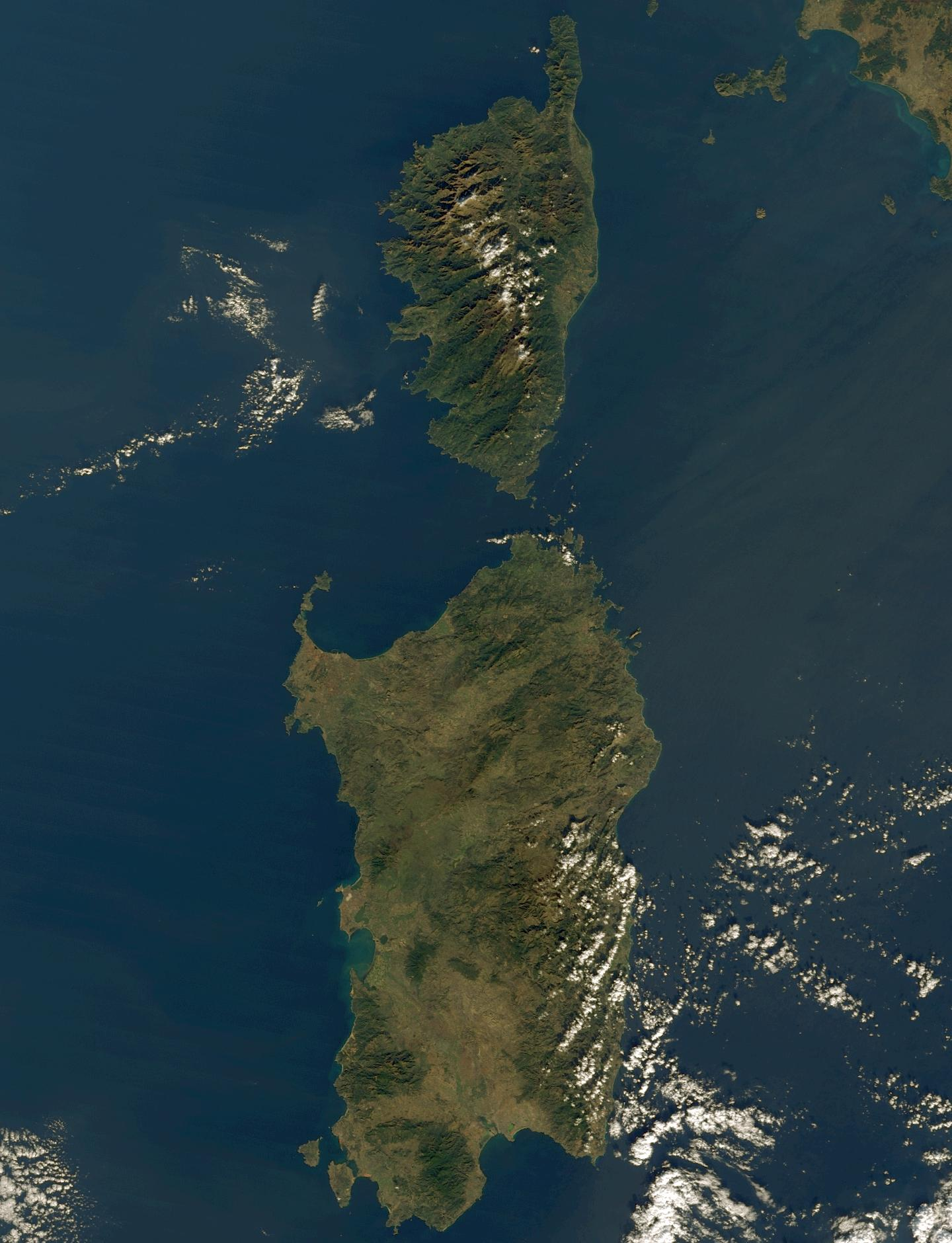
The discovery that the Licronaxu bianco vines growing in Sardinia (bottom) were the vine as Brustiano bianco allowed for the grape to be reintroduced to Corsica (top).

Historically Brustiano bianco has been confused with the Corsican and Italian wine grape Vermentino as well as the Sardinian grape Retagliado bianco.

DNA analysis has confirmed that the Licronaxu grapes growing on the island of Sardinia are the same variety as Brustiano bianco with Licronaxu nero being a dark-berried color mutation of Brustiano bianco.

== Synonyms ==
Over the years Brustiano bianco has been known under a variety of synonyms including: Bruschiami, Bruschianu, Bruschjami, Bruschjanu, Brustiano, Brustianu, Calitrano (in the commune of Sartène on Corsica), Calitranu, Colitrano (in Corsica) and Licronaxu bianco (in Sardinia).
