= Côtes Catalanes =

French wine region

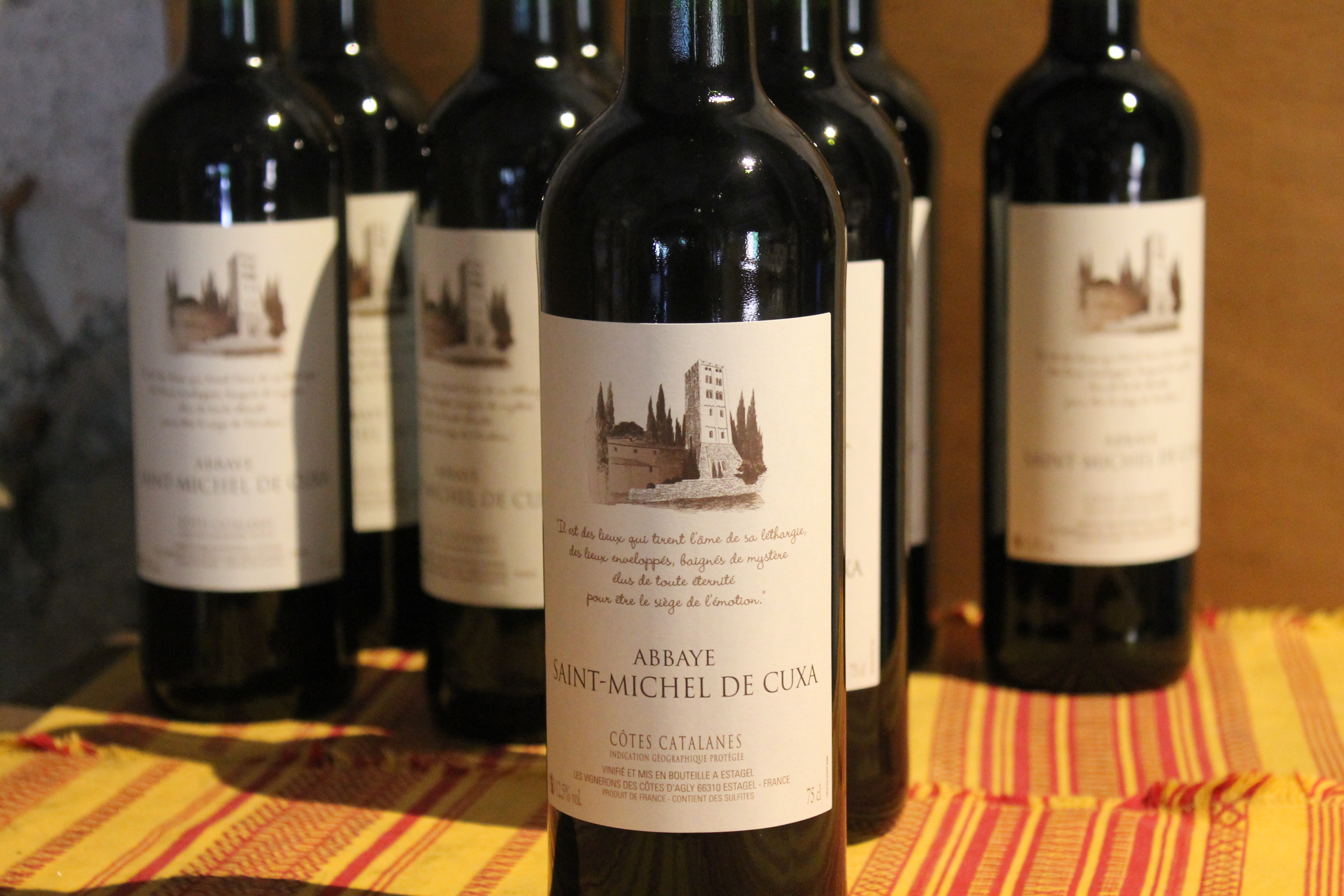

Côtes Catalanes is an IGP wine region in Languedoc-Roussillon. Syrah, Carignan and Grenache are common grapes in the appellation. The region produces dry red, rose and white wines.
