= Minerve, Hérault =

Minerve
- Commune
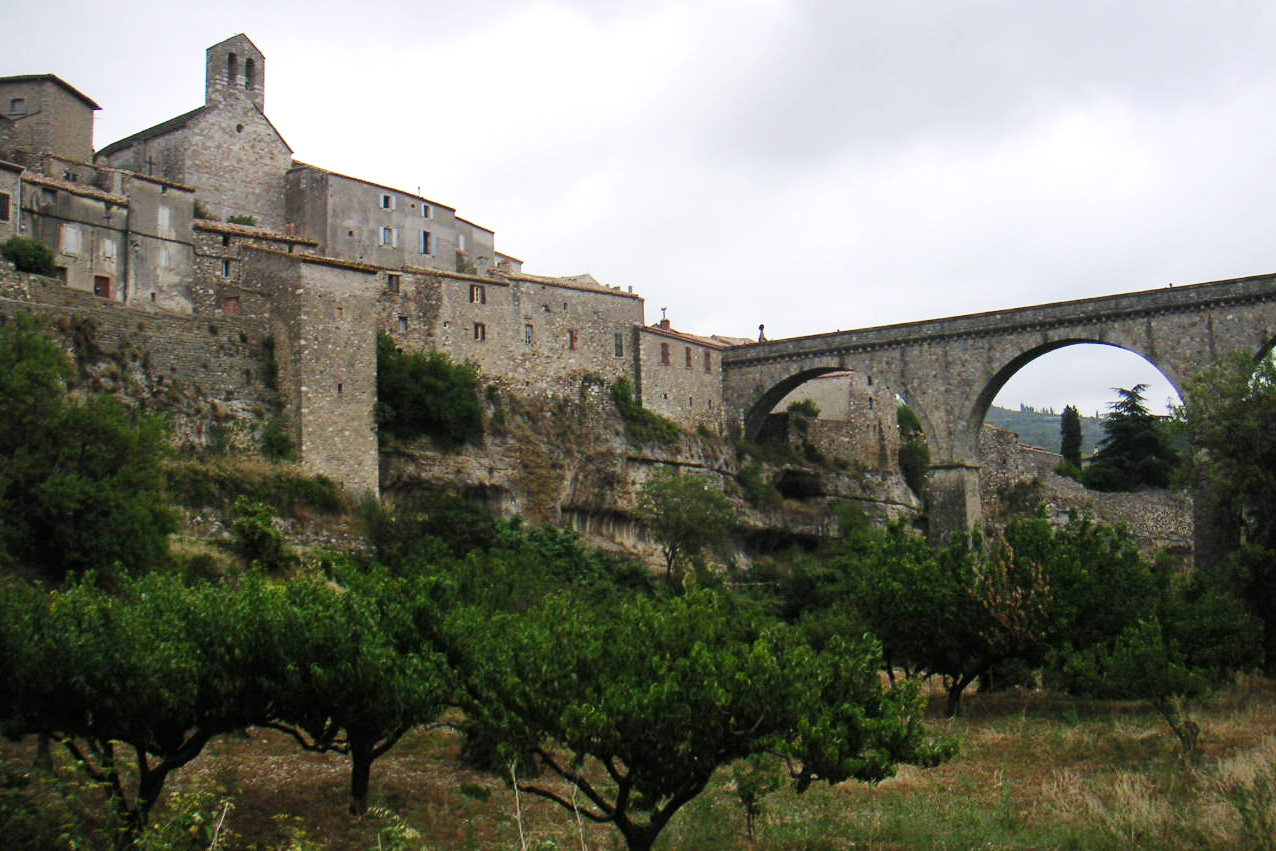
- The bridge at Minerve

- Coat of arms
- Location of Minerve
- Location within France Location within Occitanie
- Coordinates: 43°21′17″N 2°44′50″E
- Country: France
- Region: Occitania
- Department: Hérault
- Arrondissement: Béziers
- Canton: Saint-Pons-de-Thomières

Government
  - Mayor (2020–2026): Didier Vordy
- Area^{1}: 27.89 km^{2} (10.77 sq mi)
- Elevation: 227 m (745 ft)
- Highest elevation: 604 m (1,982 ft)
- Lowest elevation: 137 m (449 ft)
- Population (2023): 98
  - Density: 3.5/km^{2} (9.1/sq mi)
- Time zone: UTC+01:00 (CET)
  - Summer (DST): UTC+02:00 (CEST)
- INSEE/Postal code: 34158 /34210
- ^{1} French Land Register data, which excludes lakes, ponds, glaciers > 1 km^{2} (0.386 sq mi or 247 acres) and river estuaries.

Minerve (French pronunciation: [minɛʁv]; Occitan: Menèrba) is a commune in the Hérault department in the Occitanie region in southern France. It is the namesake of the Minervois wine region.

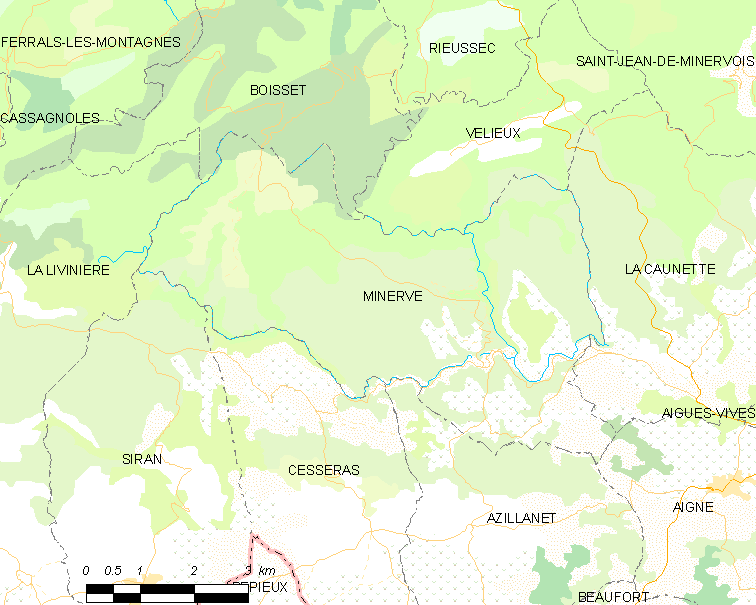
Map

== History ==
In 1210 a group of Cathars sought refuge in the village after the massacre at Béziers during the Albigensian Crusade. The village was besieged by Simon de Montfort, 5th Earl of Leicester. The attacking army besieged the village for six weeks before it surrendered. Four catapults or trebuchets were set up around the ramparts, three to attack the village itself and the largest, known as Malvoisine or "bad neighbour", to destroy the town's well. With the town's only water supply cut off, the Commander of the 200-strong garrison, Viscount Guilhem of Minerve, gave in and negotiated a surrender in order to have the villagers and himself spared from death. However, 140 Cathars refused to give up their faith and convert, being burned to death at the stake on 22 July.

== Geography ==
The village is situated on top of the gorge of the River Cesse in a naturally strong defensive position. Near the village the river disappears underground in a large, naturally carved tunnel.

== Population ==
Historical population
Year	Pop.	±% p.a.
1968	125	—
1975	106	−2.33%
1982	112	+0.79%
1990	104	−0.92%
1999	111	+0.73%
2007	119	+0.87%
2012	134	+2.40%
2017	121	−2.02%
2023	98	−3.45%
Source: INSEE

== Miscellaneous ==
Minerve has been selected as one of Les Plus Beaux Villages de France ("The Most Beautiful Villages Of France"). Historically, the village has been the capital of the Minervois wine region. The main bridge leading into the village is closed to all passenger vehicles not owned by residents of Minerve. Of all of the original fortifications, only a slender octagonal tower, known locally as the Candela, survives.

== Gallery ==
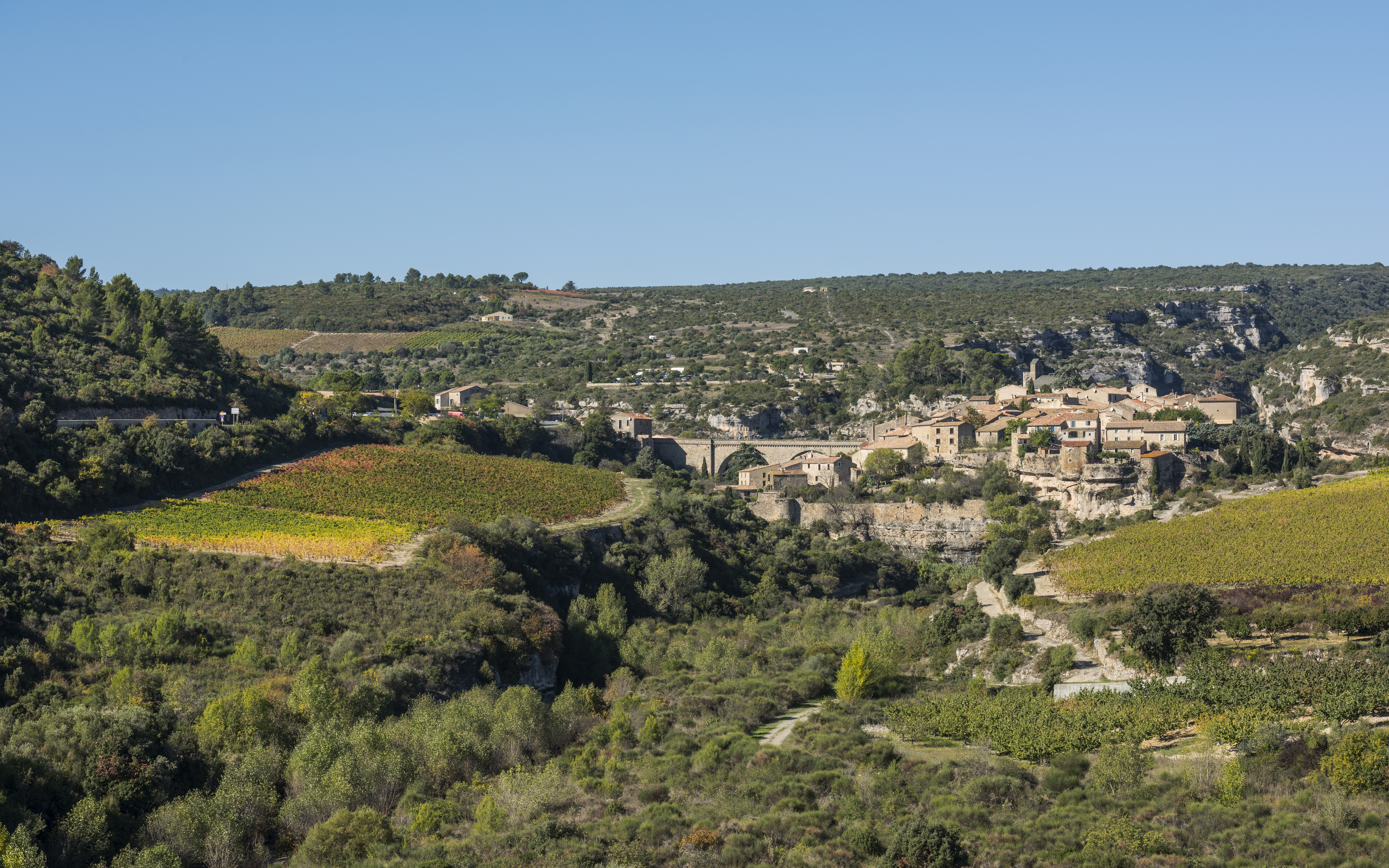
Minerve

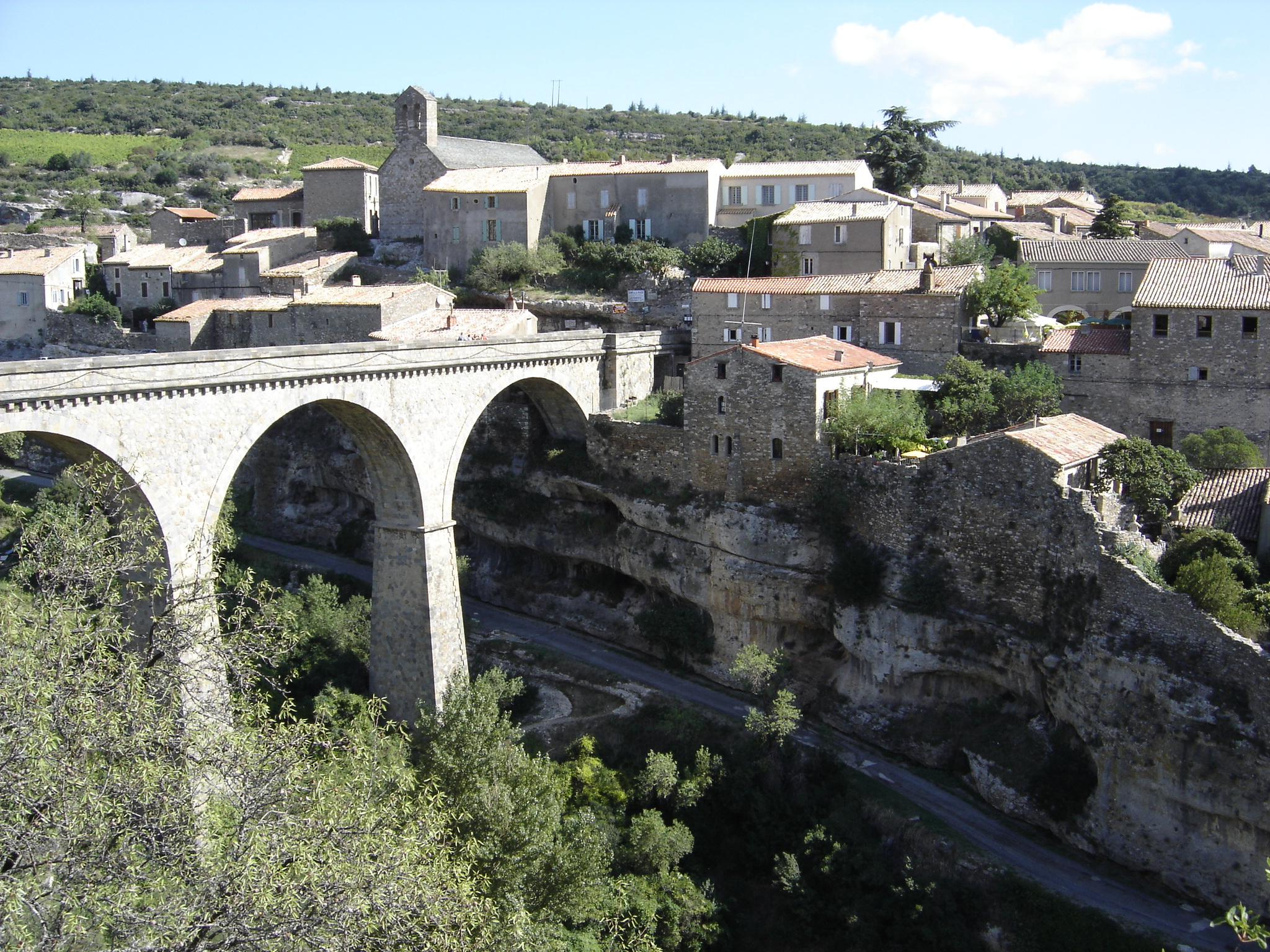
Minerve

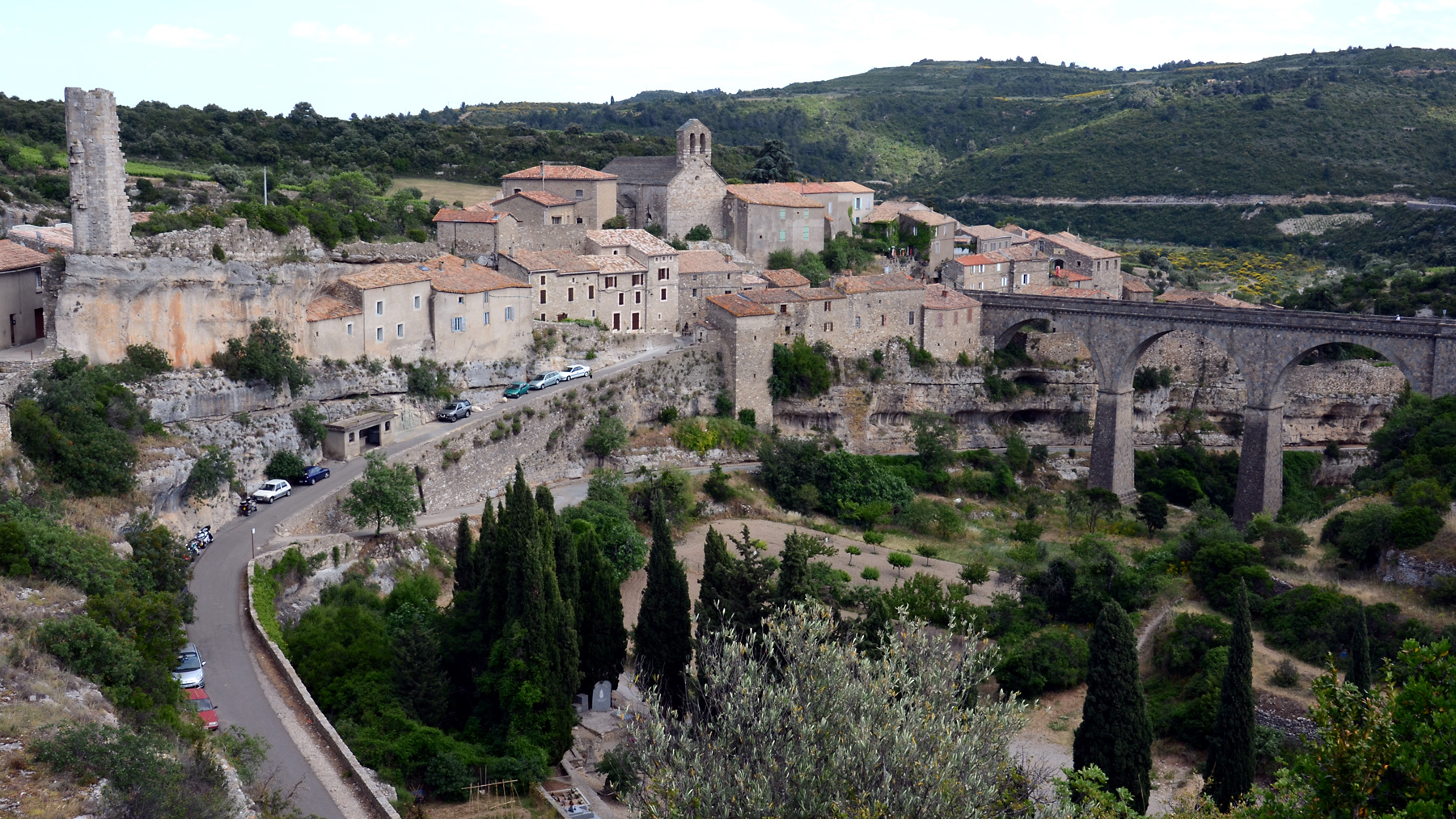
Minerve

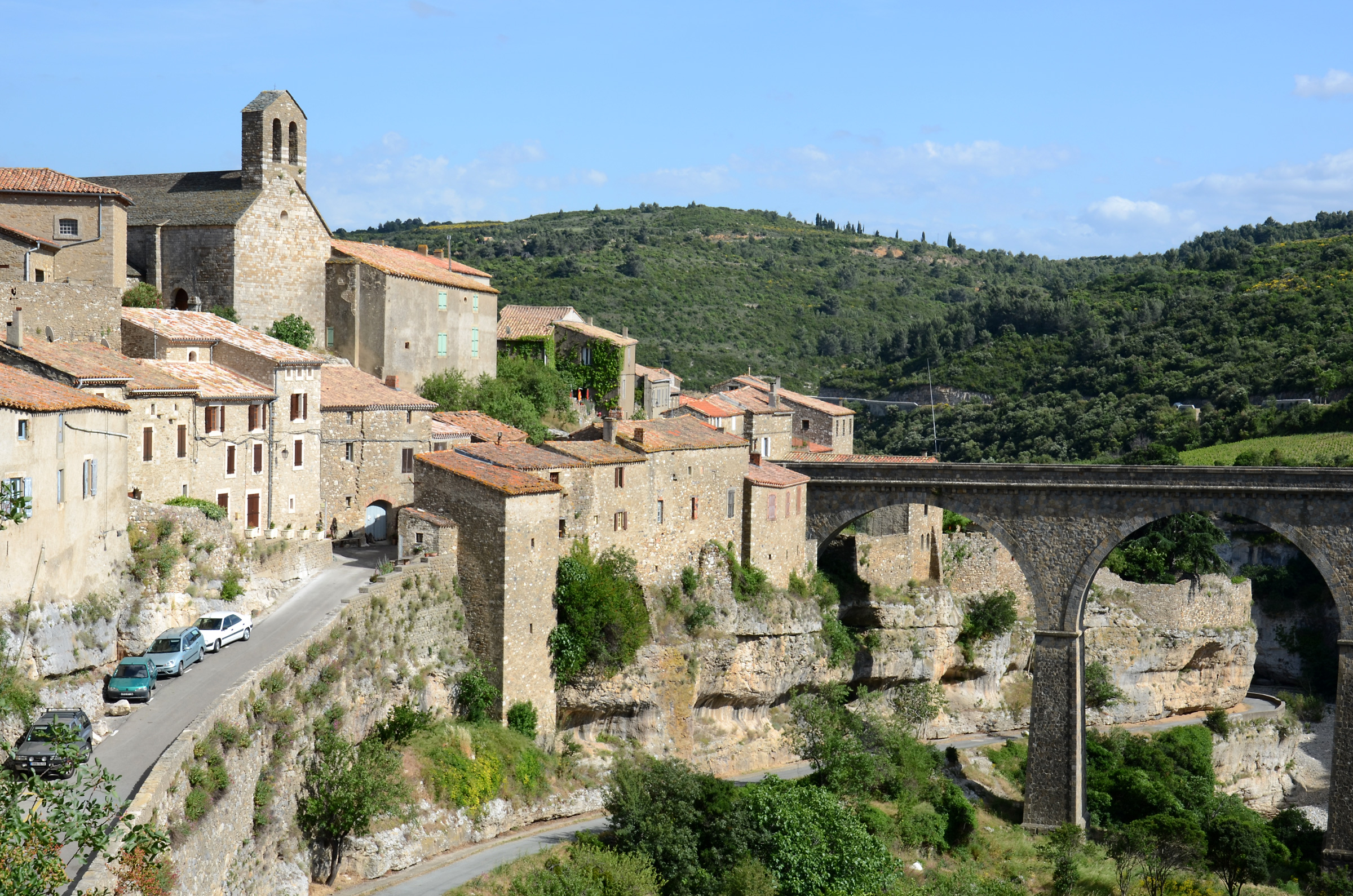
Minerve

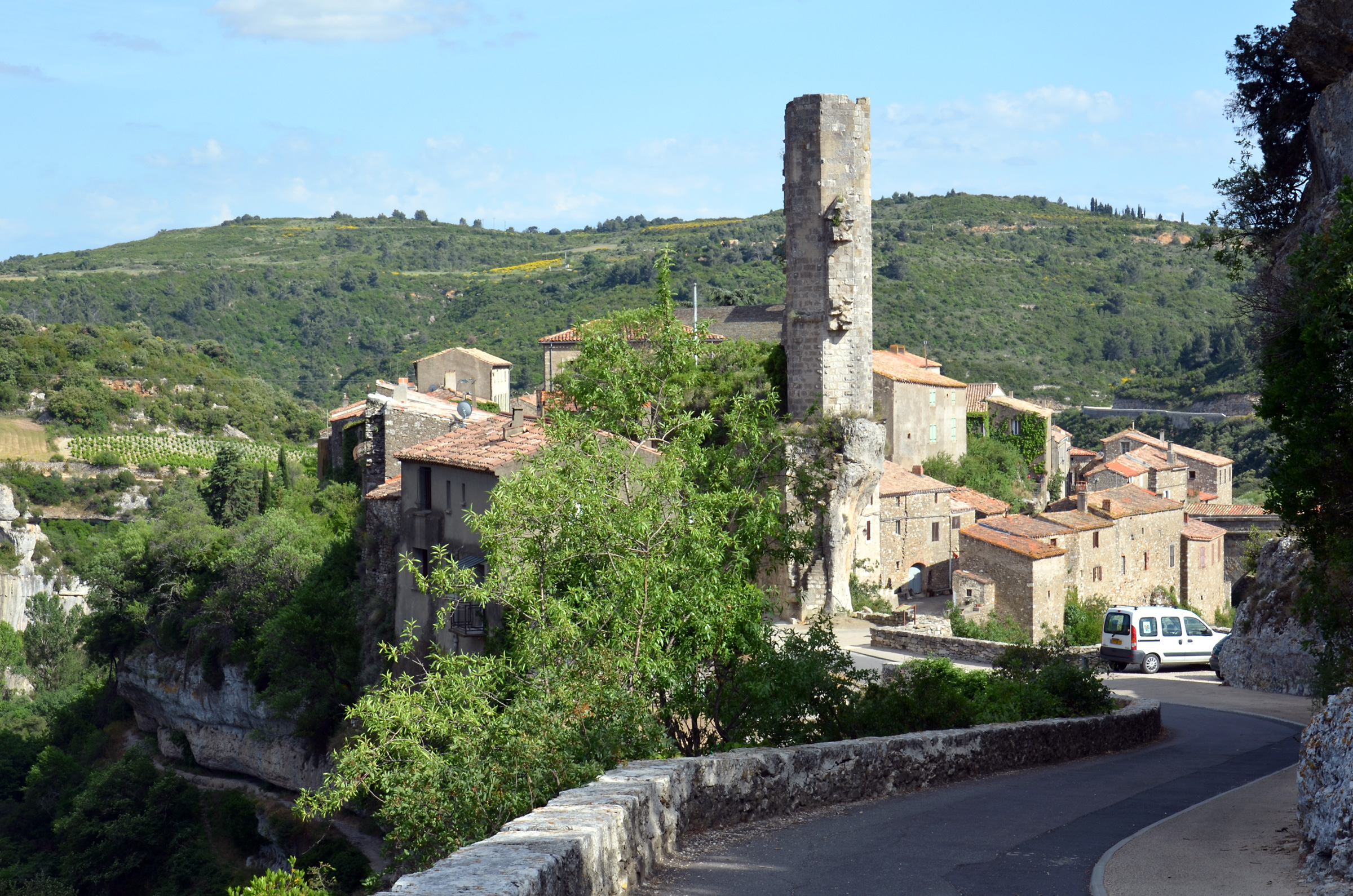
Minerve

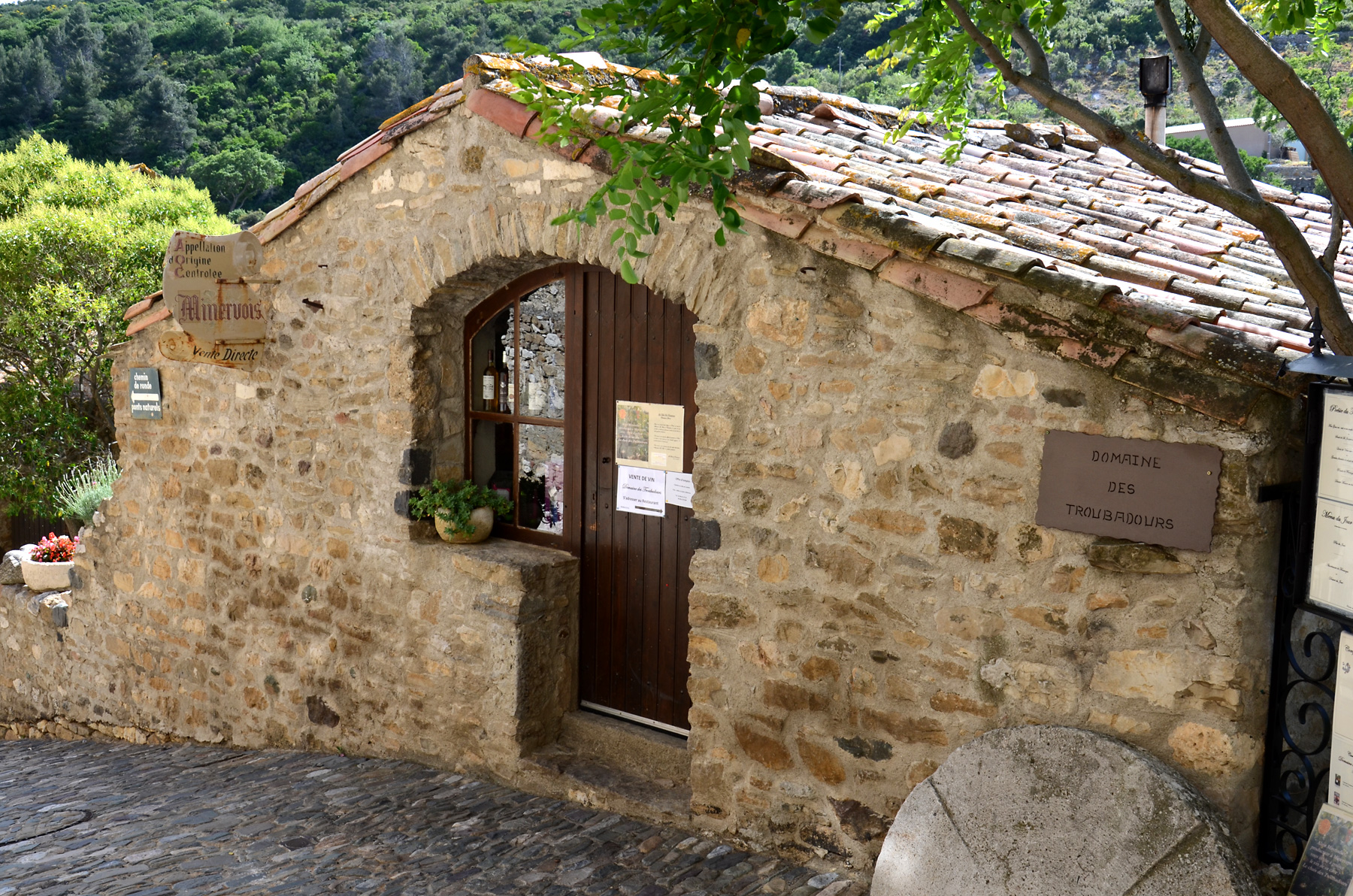
Minerve

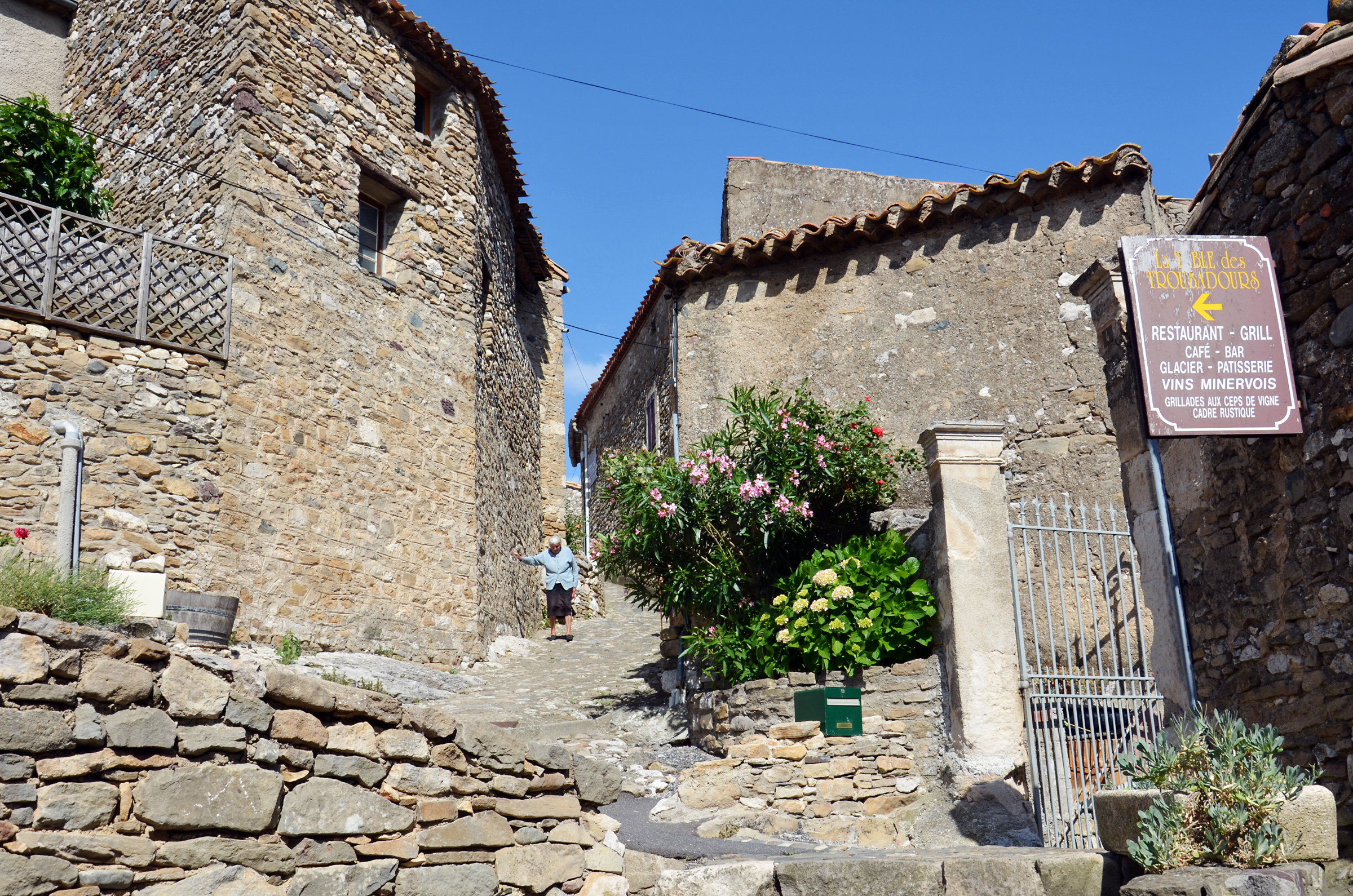
Minerve

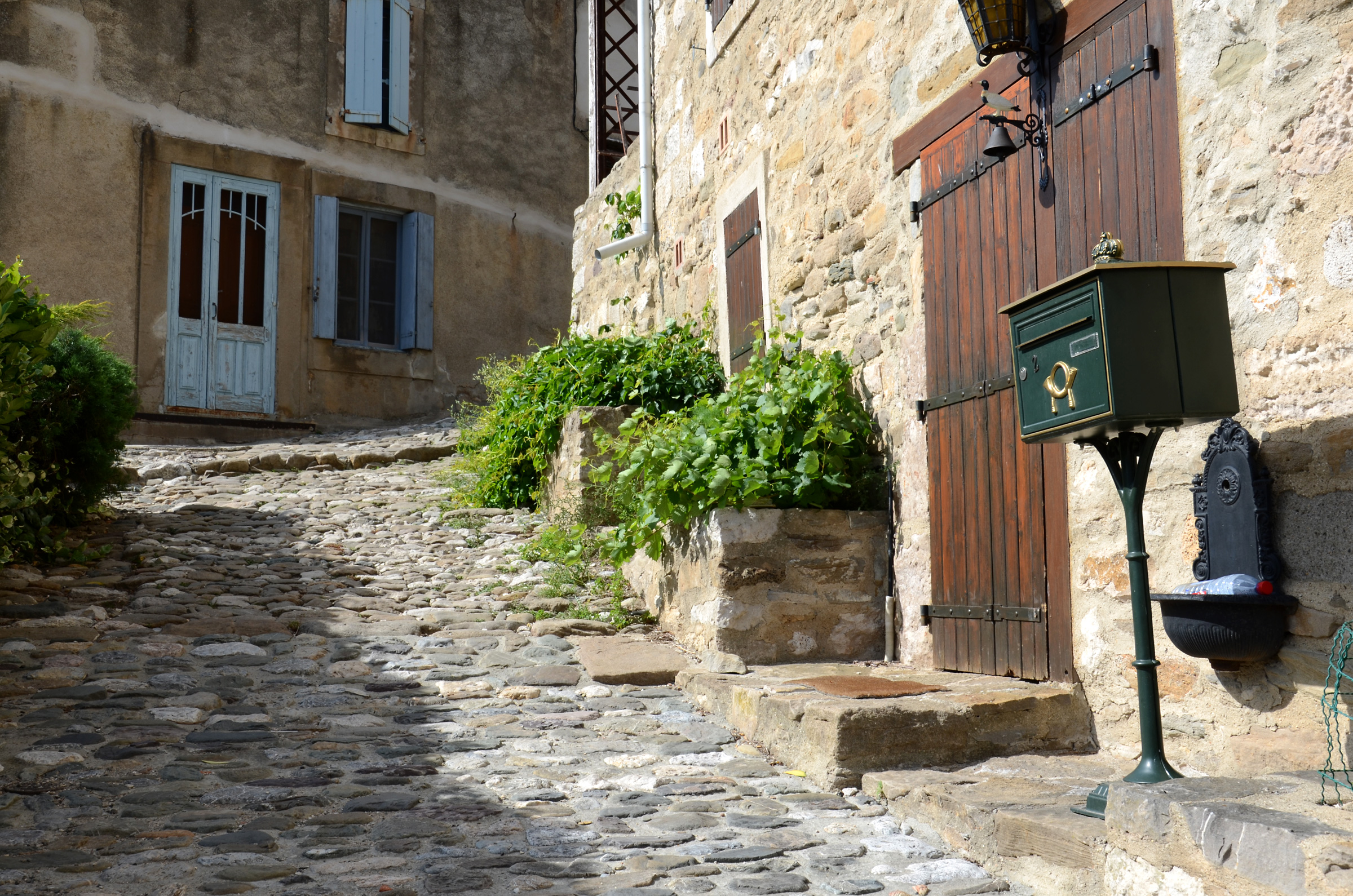
Minerve

== See also ==
- Minervois AOC
- Communes of the Hérault department
