= Mourvèdre =

Spanish wine grape variety

- Grape (Vitis)
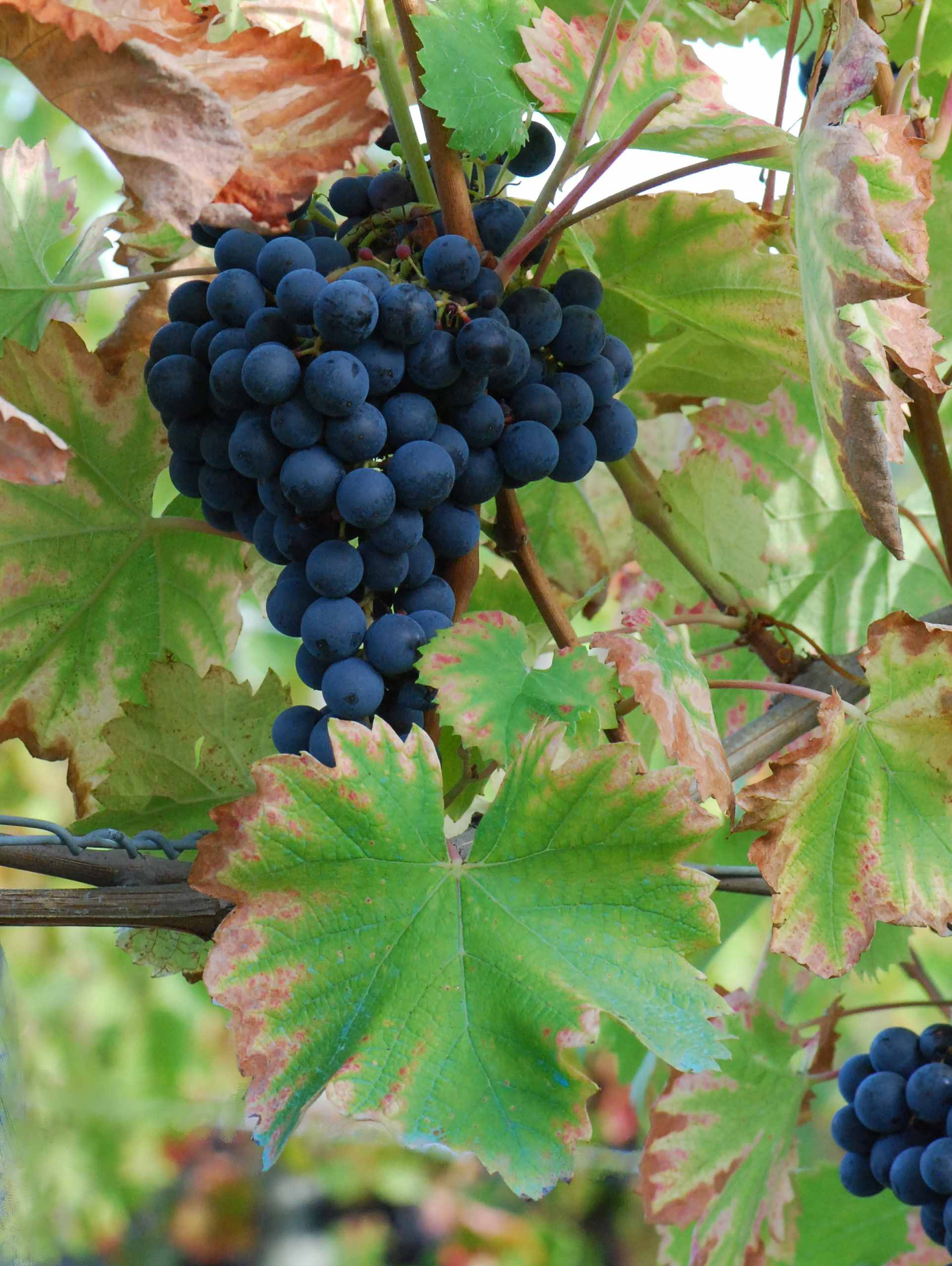
- Mourvèdre grapes
- Species: Vitis vinifera
- Also called: Mataro, Monastrell, (more)
- Origin: Mediterranean coast of Spain
- Notable regions: France, Spain, Australia, United States
- VIVC number: 7915

Mourvèdre (French pronunciation: [muʁvɛdʁ]; also known as Mataro or Monastrell) is a red wine grape variety grown in many regions around the world. It is found in the Rhône and Provence regions of France, the Valencia, Alicante and Jumilla, Bullas and Yecla denominaciones de origen (DOs) of Spain, as well as the Balearic Islands, California and Washington and the Australian regions of South Australia and New South Wales, plus South Africa. In addition to making red varietal wines, Mourvèdre is a prominent component in "GSM" (Grenache, Syrah, and Mourvèdre) blends. The variety is also used to make rosé and port-style fortified wines.

Mourvèdre tends to produce tannic wines that can be high in alcohol. The style of wine produced from the grapes varies greatly according to where it is produced, but according to wine expert Jancis Robinson Mourvèdre wines often have wild game, or earthy notes to them, with soft red fruit flavors. According to wine expert Oz Clarke, young Mourvèdre can come across as faulted due to the reductive, sulfur notes and "farmyard-y" flavors that some wines can exhibit before those flavors mellow with age.

The variety can be a difficult grape to grow, preferring "its face in the hot sun and its feet in the water" meaning that it needs very warm weather, a low leaf-to-fruit ratio but adequate water or irrigation to produce intensely flavored fruit that is not overly jammy or herbaceous. The vines' susceptibility to many viticultural hazards such as powdery and downy mildew as well as overly vigorous foliage can present additional problems for vine growers.

== History ==
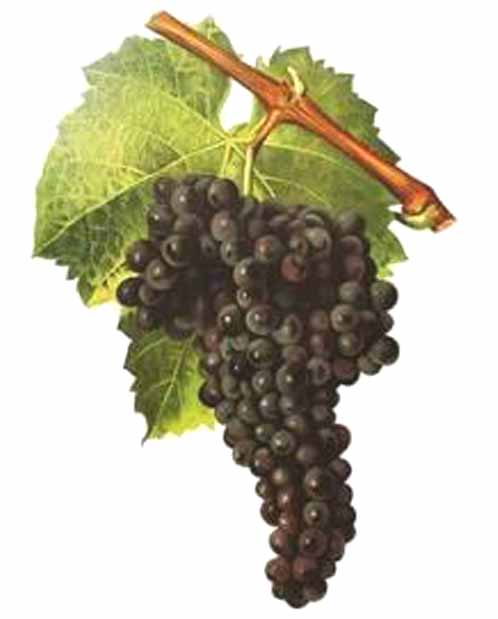
Mourvèdre from an early 20th-century ampelography text

Most wine historians agree that Mourvèdre is likely to be Spanish in origin, though its exact history is difficult to pinpoint. The variety was probably introduced to Valencia by the Phoenicians around 500 BC. The French-adapted name Mourvèdre probably came from Murviedro (Morvedre in Valencian, nowadays Sagunt) near Valencia while the name Mataro is thought to have come from Mataró, Catalonia near the modern-day city of Barcelona.

Despite this close association with Murviedro and Mataró, the grape became known in Spain as Monastrell for reasons that are still unknown though Oz Clarke speculates that a "neutral" name may have been chosen so as not to offend the local pride of both regions.

Mourvèdre had a well-established presence in Roussillon region of France by at least the 16th century when still part of Spain (until 1659) where it spread eastwards towards Provence and the Rhone. There it had a well established foothold until the phylloxera epidemic of the mid to late 19th century decimated plantings. As the French and other European wine regions recovered from the phylloxera scourge by grafting Vitis vinifera varieties to American rootstock, it was discovered that Mourvèdre vines did not take well to the grafting and many vineyards were replanted with other varieties.

Mourvèdre arrived in California in the 1860s as part of the Pellier collection. The variety, known as Mataro, was used primarily for bulk produced jug wines. In the 1980s and 90s, interest in Mourvèdre as a premium grape variety picked up as the Rhone Rangers began seeking out old-vine plantings of the variety in the eastern part of Contra Costa County. In the 1990s, critically acclaimed bottlings from Bonny Doon Vineyard and Cline Cellars Winery promoted demand in the variety and by the mid-2000s, plantings of Mourvèdre in California had risen to 260 ha (650 acres).

In Australia, the variety (known there as Mataro) has had a long history in the country with plantings dating back to the mid-19th century. In the 1980s, many of these old vine plantings were uprooted in a government sponsored vine pulling scheme but some still survive and are producing today. While historically the variety was used mainly as an anonymous blending grape in fortified wines, the variety saw a rise in interest in the 1990s as producers started receiving acclaim for GSM (Grenache, Syrah, and Mourvèdre) blends (many from the surviving, low yield old vine plantings). With a slight increase in planting there were more than 1000 ha of Mataro in Australia by the mid-2000s.

It has been put forward by Ampelographists that Mourvèdre may be the parent to the esteemed grape Mavrud, or that at least Mavrud is a clone of Mourvèdre, imported into Bulgaria by the Romans.

== Viticulture ==
According to ampelographer Pierre Galet Mourvèdre thrives in warm climates as the variety has a tendency to both bud and ripen very late. While the variety can recover well from late spring frost due to the late budding, it can be very temperature sensitive throughout its growing season with even low winter temperatures affecting its dormancy. Though the grape can adapt to a variety of vineyard soil types, the most ideal sites are very warm, south facing (Northern hemisphere) slopes with shallow, clay soils that can retain the necessary moisture to keep the vines "feet" wet without letting it grow its foliage too vigorously. In addition to a warm climate, Mourvèdre also does best in a dry climate with sufficient wind to protect it from the viticultural hazards of powdery mildew and downy mildew.

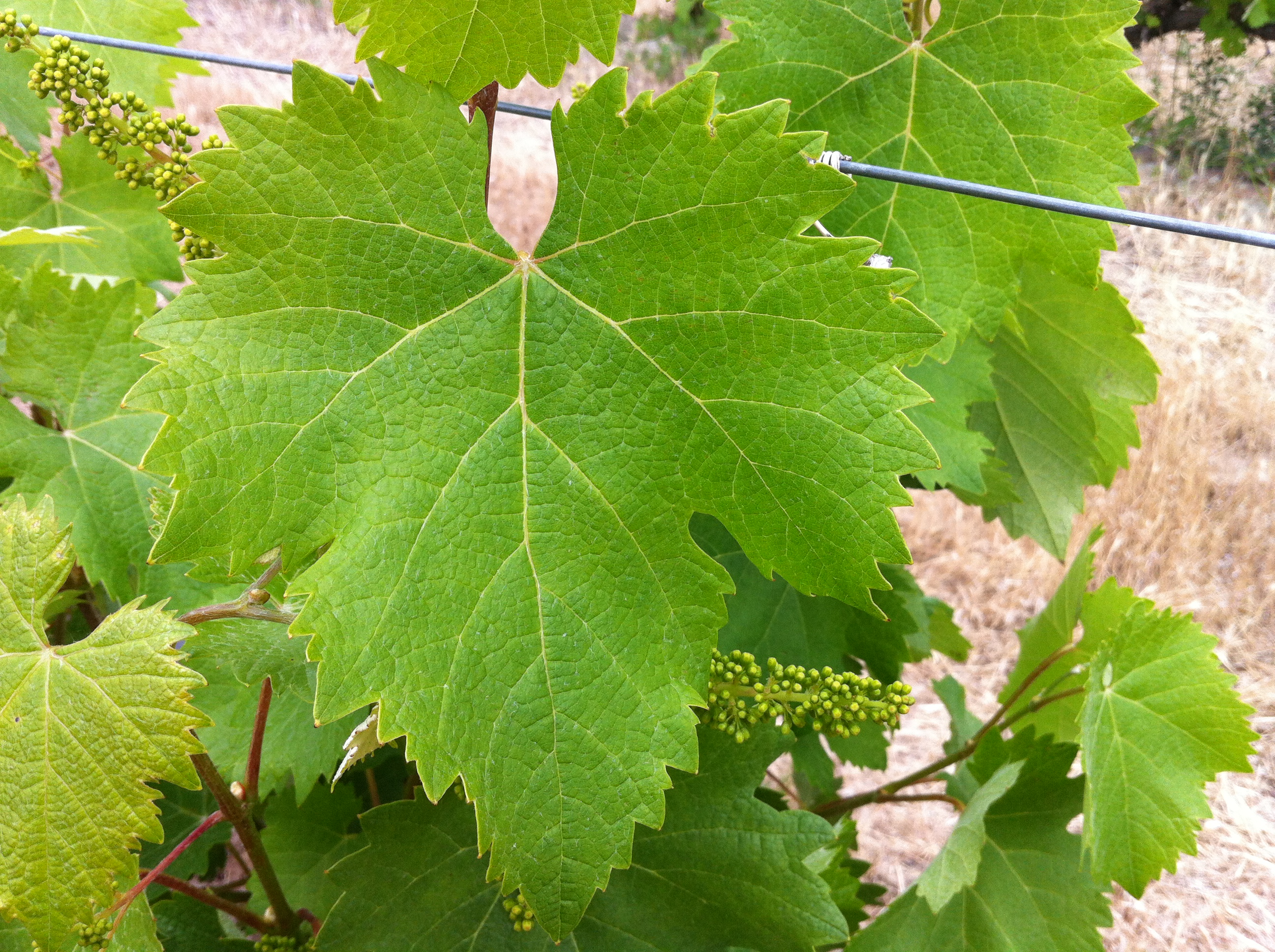
Mourvèdre leaf.

The grape clusters of Mourvèdre are relatively compact, enhancing its susceptibility to mildew, with small thick-skinned berries that are high in both color and flavor phenolics, particularly tannins. Even though the variety ripens late, it has the potential to ripen to high Brix sugar levels which can translate into a high alcohol level during fermentation. The vine can also be very vigorous, producing abundant foliage that can shade the grape clusters, affecting canopy management decisions for growers. In Australia and California, many of the oldest plantings of Mourvèdre are bush trained as the vines grows well vertically but the variety can be grown under many different kinds of vine training systems.

The harvest window for the grape tends to be very short once it reaches peak ripeness, with acidity rapidly falling and the grapes soon desiccating and developing "prune-y" flavors. One advantage of the thick skins is that Mourvèdre can withstand late harvest rains without the berries swelling and bursting like thinner skin varieties such as Grenache. In regions such as the Paso Robles AVA of California, it is often one of the last varieties to be harvested sometimes hanging onto the vine until early November.

Mourvèdre produces medium-size, compact bunches that are usually conical in shape with a small wing cluster that may be discarded during green harvesting. The leaves often have truncate cuneiform "wedge" shape. Since World War II, newer clones and better rootstock have been developed that have allowed Mourvèdre vines to be grafted more easily. Today many plantings of Mourvèdre are to 110R and 41B rootstocks.

== Wine regions ==
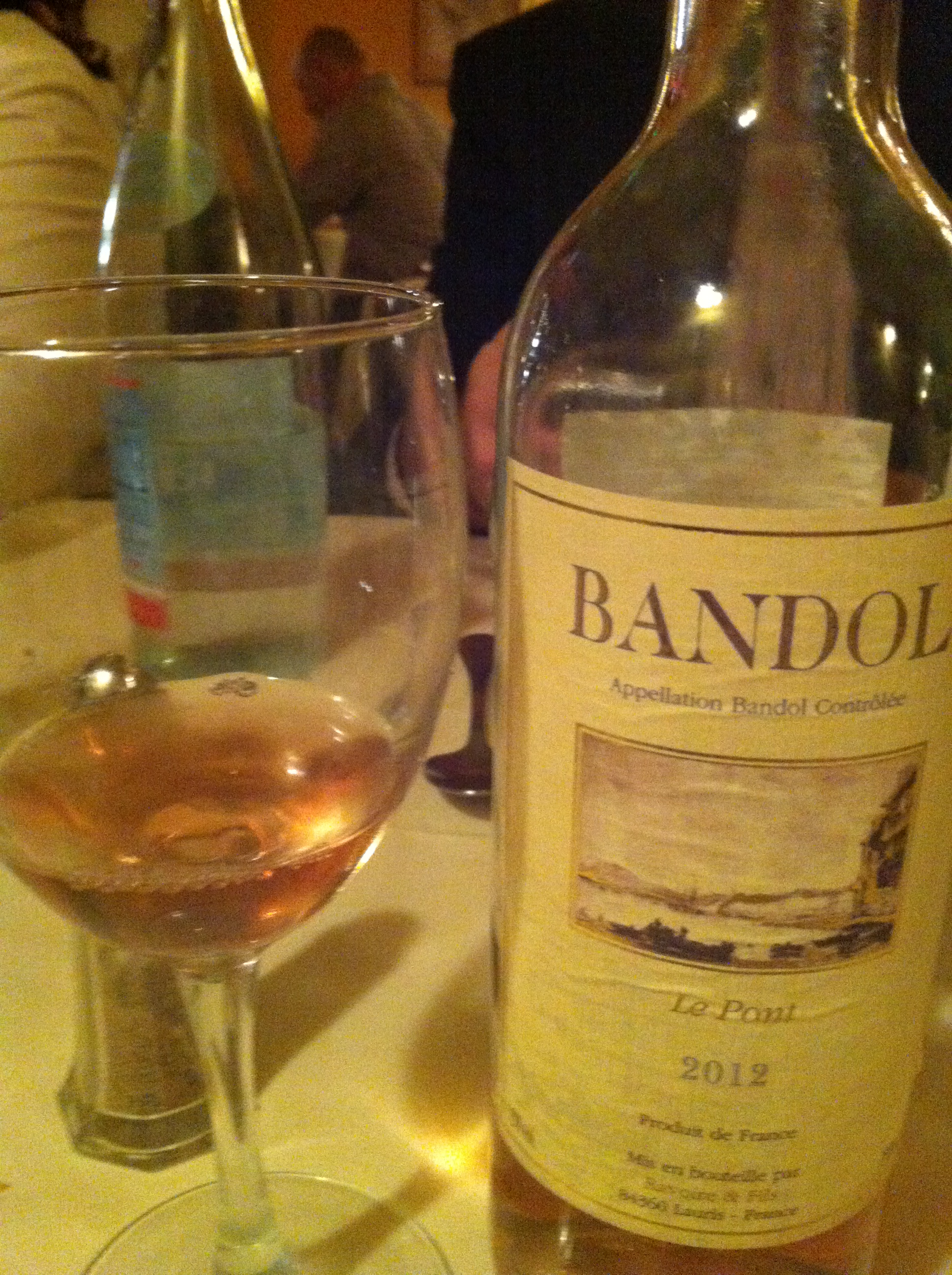
A rosé Bandol wine from Provence made mostly from Mourvèdre.

=== Spain ===
In Spain, Mourvèdre is called Monastrell and was the fourth most widely planted red wine grape variety with 43,049 hectares (106,380 acres) in 2015. Like many other Spanish varieties, its numbers have been declining in recent years (in 1996 there was over 100,000 ha/250,000 of the vine planted in Spain) as growers pull up older plantings and replant them with popular international varieties such as Cabernet Sauvignon and Chardonnay. However, the variety still has a strong hold in eastern Spain where it is widely planted in several Spanish wine regions around Murcia and the Valencian Community. Under Spanish wine law, Monastrell is one of the primary red wine grape varieties in the DOPs of Jumilla, Yecla, Valencia, Almansa, and Alicante.

Other Spanish DOPs where Monastrell is a permitted variety include Binissalem-Mallorca and Plà i Llevant in the Balearic Islands, Bullas, Catalunya, Cariñena, Costers del Segre, Manchuela, Penedès and Ribera del Guadiana. Monastrell is also permitted in the sparkling wine Cava though it is rarely used.

=== France ===
In France, Mourvèdre doesn't grow much farther north than the Châteauneuf-du-Pape AOC in the southern Rhône; and even there it has some trouble ripening in cooler vintages. It tends to ripen most consistently in the warmer Provençal region of Bandol AOC along the Mediterranean coast where the growing season is often 5 °C warmer. While plantings have been declining in Spain, they have been increasing in France, particularly in the Languedoc-Roussillon region where the grape variety has seen growing popularity as both a varietal wine and as a blending component.

After the phylloxera epidemic of the late 19th century and with declining interest in the variety for most of the 20th century, there were less than 900 ha in 1968, mostly in the southern Rhône and the Bandol AOC of Provence. But the spark of interest and international investment in the Languedoc saw planting sharply increase and by 2000 there were over 7,600 ha of Mourvèdre planted throughout Southern France.

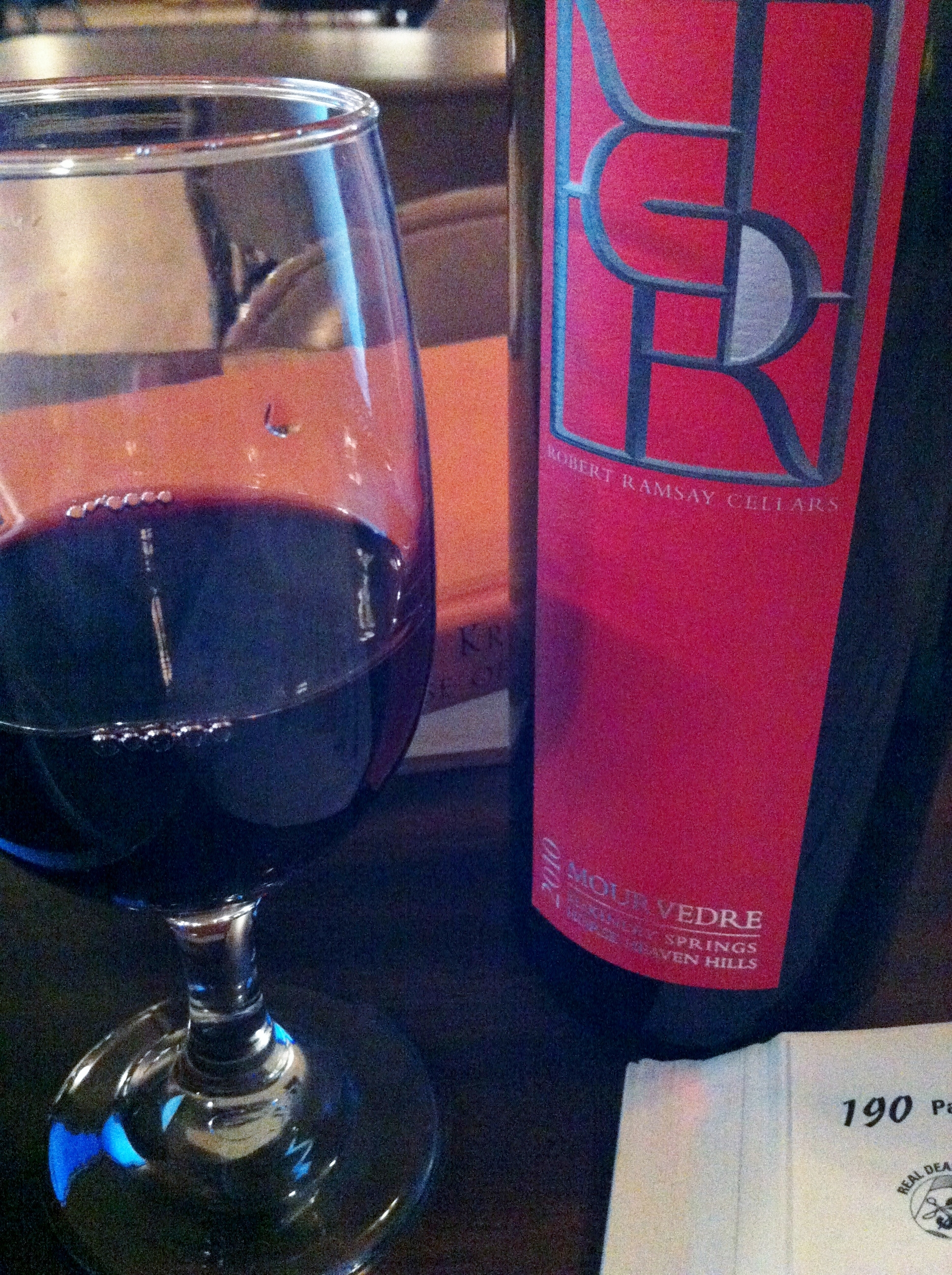
A Mourvèdre from the Horse Heaven Hills AVA in Washington State.

While Bandol is the AOC region that most prominently features Mourvèdre (the Bandol AOP regulations require that red wines must contain at least 50% Mourvèdre and rosés at least 20%), other Appellation d'origine contrôlée (AOC)s that have Mourvèdre as a permitted variety include Cassis, Collioure, Corbières, Costières de Nîmes, Coteaux d'Aix-en-Provence, Coteaux du Languedoc, Coteaux de Pierrevert, Coteaux Varois, Côtes du Luberon, Coteaux du Tricastin, Côtes de Provence, Côtes du Rhône, Côtes du Rhône Villages, Côtes du Roussillon, Côtes du Roussillon Villages, Côtes du Ventoux, Faugères, Fitou, Palette, Saint-Chinian, Gigondas, Lirac, Minervois and Vacqueyras.

In Châteauneuf-du-Pape it is one of the 18 permitted varieties of red wine but is often a secondary component behind Grenache and Syrah. The exceptions are notable blends from producers such as Château de Beaucastel which often has Mourvèdre account for more than a third of the blend. As of 2009, Mourvèdre accounted for 6.6% (213 ha) of all Châteauneuf-du-Pape plantings.

=== New World ===
In the United States, Mourvèdre is found primarily in California and Washington State with some limited plantings in Arizona, Missouri, New Mexico, Oregon, Texas and Virginia. In the US, the style of Mourvèdre tends to be less tannic than Old World examples such as Bandols. In Washington State, the grape was first planted at Red Willow Vineyard in the Yakima Valley AVA in 1983. The 1990s and 2000s saw an increase of plantings of the variety, most notably at Alder Ridge Vineyard and Destiny Ridge Vineyard in the Horse Heaven Hills AVA and Ciel du Cheval Vineyard in the Red Mountain AVA. In Washington, the grape is used in both varietal and Rhone-style blends where it provides a medium body structure with cherry fruit flavors as well smokey, spicy and gamy notes.

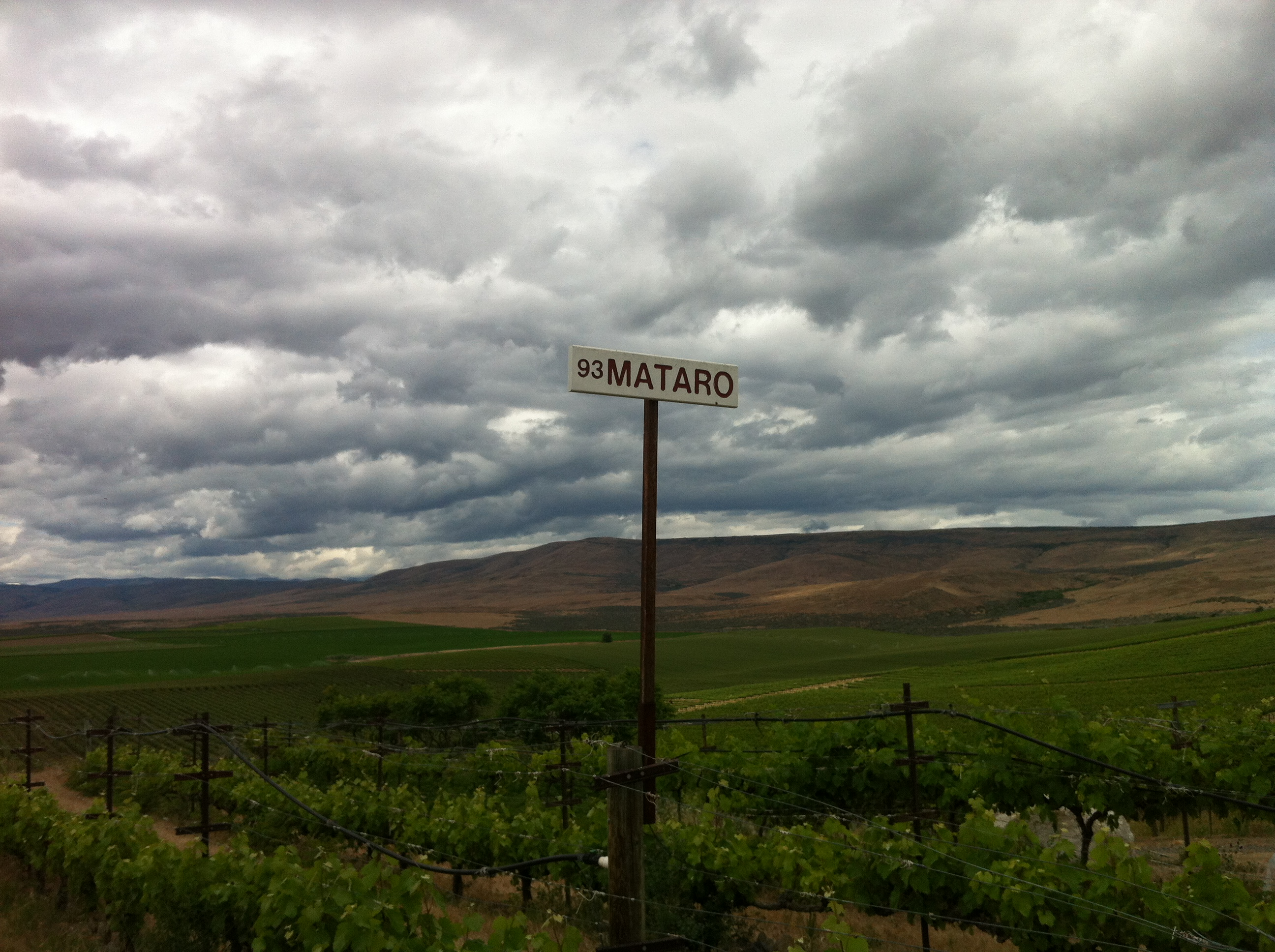
Mourvèdre/Mataro was first planted in Washington State at Red Willow Vineyard in the Yakima Valley.

In California, Mourvèdre reached the United States in the 1860s as part of the Pellier collection and was likely first planted in Santa Clara County. The variety, known as Mataro, was widely planted in anonymous field blends that was used primarily for bulk produced jug wines. From the middle of the 20th century, it saw its plantings rapidly decline from more than 2700 acres in 1968 to less than a third of that by the 2000s. Its numbers would have declined more drastically had the variety not captured the interest of Rhone Rangers in the 1980s and 90s, who began seeking out old-vine plantings of the variety in vineyards Contra Costa County. On the heels of some critically acclaimed varietal and Rhone-style blends (as well as the introduction of better quality clones) featuring Mourvèdre, plantings in California rose slightly from 260 ha (650 acres) at the turn of the 21st century to 900 acres in 2010.

There are around 12 square kilometres of Mourvèdre in Australia, where it is also known as Mataro, though more producers have begun adopting the French name Mourvèdre. While the grape has a long history of being used for generic cask wines and fortified wine, it has recently become more popular in highly acclaimed GSM blends with Grenache and Syrah. Like many grape varieties, Mourvèdre was first introduced to Australia as part of James Busby's collection of cuttings from his European travels in the 1830s. There it was quickly established in the South Australia wine region of the Barossa Valley by Lutheran immigrants from the Silesia Province in Prussia. From there it was spread by English immigrants to the McLaren Vale region south of Adelaide. Some of the oldest continually producing vines of Mourvèdre are in the New South Wales wine region of Riverina or South Australian wine region of Riverland. Turkey Flat Vineyards in the Barossa Valley was one of the forerunners of producing Mourvèdre as a single varietal wine with its first vintage in 2005.

=== Other regions ===
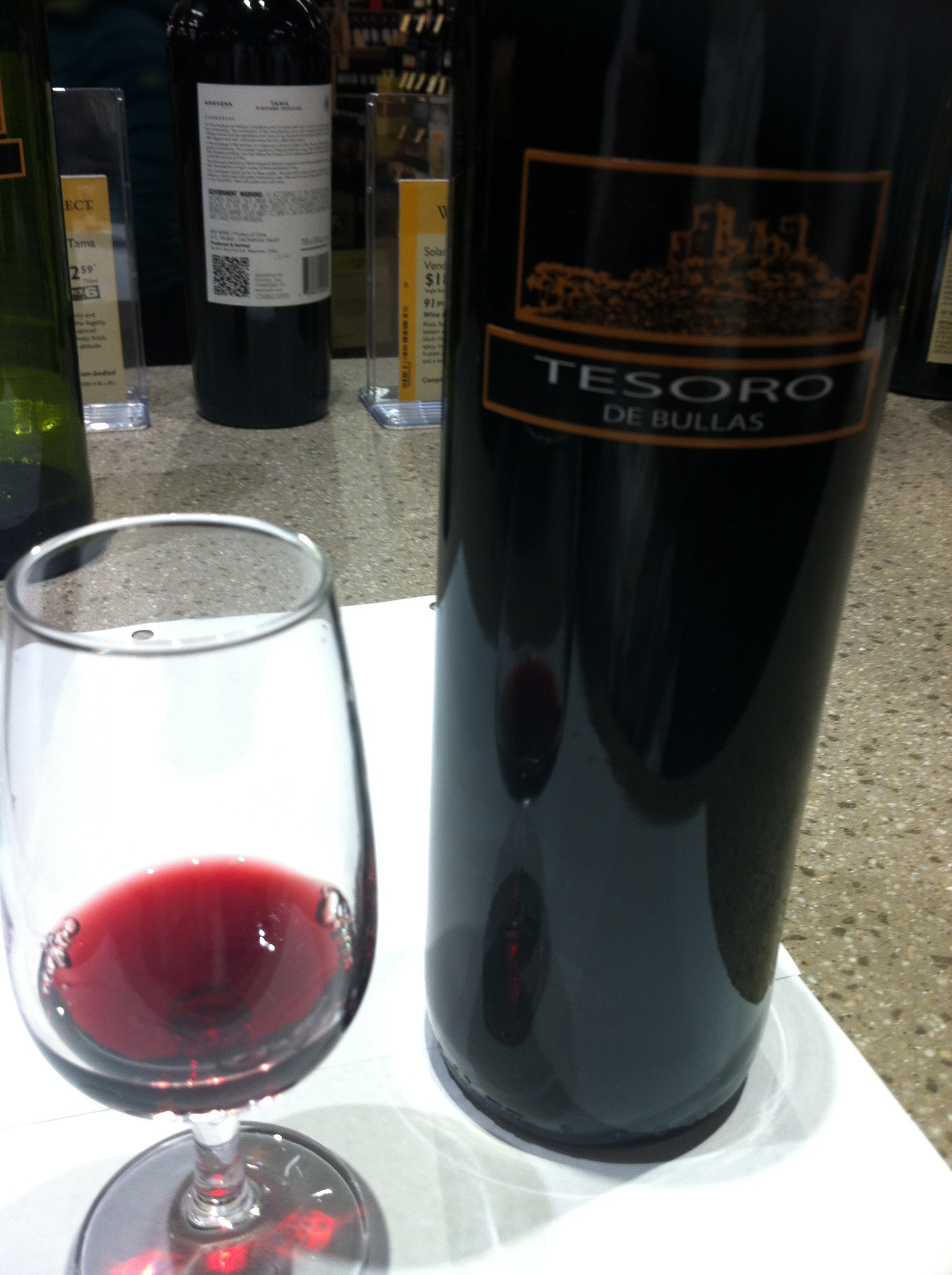
A Spanish Mourvèdre, known there as Monastrell, from the Bullas wine region.

According to Pierre Galet, there are some plantings of Mourvèdre in Azerbaijan under a variety of synonyms that have not all been fully identified. In South Africa, Rhone-style producers have also begun working with the variety.

== Winemaking and wine styles ==
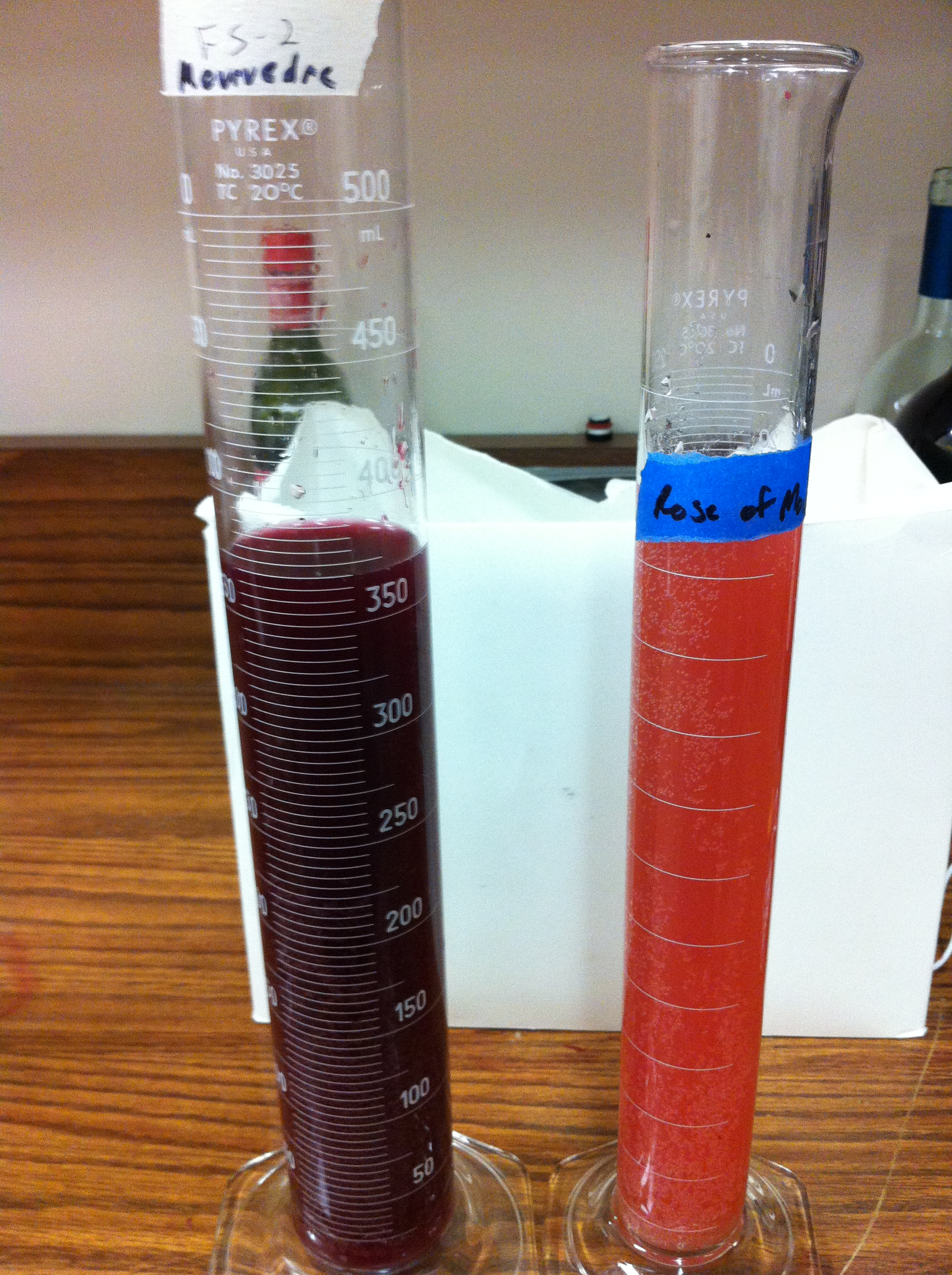
Example of Mourvèdre (left) and a saignée rosé (right) separated from the same fermentation batch after a few days of skin contact

The small, thick-skin berries of Mourvèdre are high in phenolic compounds that have the potential to produce a deeply colored, very tannic wine with significant alcohol levels if harvested at high sugar levels. However, the variety is rarely harvested at sugar levels below 13% alcohol (approx 23 Brix) because the flavors at those lower levels are often very weak and herbaceous.

In winemaking, wines made from Mourvèdre are prone to both oxidation and reductive flavors (such as hydrogen sulfide) if care is not taken at the winery. While in Bandol, it is common to ferment Mourvèdre with the stems, the grapes usually go through a crusher/destemmer in New World regions such as a California due to the harsher, green tannins that are more typical of the stems in those regions. While the wine can be stored in oak barrels, it often does not absorb oak flavors as well as other varieties (such as Merlot and Cabernet Sauvignon) so it is often stored in neutral oak or large format barrels.

In many regions of the world, Mourvèdre is often blended with other varieties such as Grenache and Syrah in the "GSM" blends of Rhône, Australia and the United States. In these blends, Mourvèdre often provides color, fruit and some tannic structure to complement the fruity Grenache and elegant Syrah. In Provence and Rhône it also sometimes blended with Cinsault and Carignan as part of both red table wines and rosé. In Australia, the variety is sometimes used in fortified port-style wines.

According to wine expert Jancis Robinson, in favorable vintages Mourvèdre can produce highly perfumed wines with intense fruit flavors and notes of blackberries and gamey or meaty flavors. Oz Clarke notes that some examples of Mourvèdre may come across as faulted in their youth with "farmyard-y" and strong herbal flavors. As the wine ages, more earthy tertiary aromas may develop before becoming more leather and gingerbread aroma notes.

In both Old and New World wine regions, Mourvèdre is a popular grape to be used in rosé winemaking. These wines can be made as a dedicated rosé where the skins are allowed only a brief period of skin contact (a few hours or a single day) before they are pressed or as saignée where some of the juice destined for a red Mourvèdre is "bled off" during fermentation creating two separate wines—a darker, more concentrated red wine and the lighter rosé.

== Synonyms and relationship to other grapes ==
Mourvèdre is the name used in France. Worldwide, there are 95 other names, including Mataro, which is used in Portugal and parts of the New World; and Monastrell, which is used in Spain. In English-speaking wine producing areas, Mourvèdre is most commonly used; it is the official name used by the U.S. Alcohol and Tobacco Tax and Trade Bureau. Despite the similarities of its synonyms, Mourvèdre has no relation to the Spanish wine grape Graciano which is also known as Morrastel in France.

At one point, the Cognac grape Balzac blanc was thought to be a color mutation of Mourvèdre due to the similarities in synonyms with Mourvèdre also being known as Balzac noir. However, DNA analysis at the turn of the 21st century showed that the two varieties had no relation. Despite having the synonym Rossola nera, Mourvèdre has no known relationship to the Lombardy wine grape of the same name with the latter being an offspring of the Piedmontese wine grape Nebbiolo.
