= Côtes du Roussillon AOC =

Coordinates: 42°51′55″N 2°53′44″E

Côtes du Roussillon (French pronunciation: [kot dy ʁusijɔ̃]) is an Appellation d'Origine Contrôlée for wines made in the Roussillon wine region of France. It is the least selective AOC in the Roussillon region. In 2002, 21,048,500 litres of Côtes du Roussillon were produced, 68% red, 28% rosé and 4% white. Grenache is the dominant variety in Red and Rosé. According to the AOC rules, however, red wines must be made with at least three varieties of grapes. The total of the two main variety grapes should not make more than 90% of the blend, and there must not be more than 60% of Carignan in it.

== Grape varieties ==
Côtes du Roussillon are made with the traditional variety grapes of the Roussillon, that is Grenache noir, Grenache blanc, Carignan, Lladoner Pelut, Cinsault, Macabeu and Malvoisie and with some new to the region variety grapes: Syrah, Mourvèdre, Roussanne, Marsanne (all from Côte du Rhone) and Vermentino (from Italy).

== Côtes du Roussillon Villages AOC ==
Côtes du Roussillon-Villages is a sub-appellation in the northern half of the appellation in the valley of the river Agly, from the best slopes around the valley. The appellation is in the foothills of the Pyrenees and the better wines are normally produced from vines on the slopes, not in the valley floors. It is purely for red wines, with stricter appellation regulations than regular Côtes du Roussillon.

The blend allowed is: Carignan (maximum 60%), Syrah, Mourvèdre (minimum 30% combined), Grenache noir, Lladoner. Note that a minimum of three varieties are allowed in the blend.

== See also ==
- List of appellations in Languedoc-Roussillon
- List of Vins de Primeur
