= Vermentino =

Variety of grape

- Grape (Vitis)
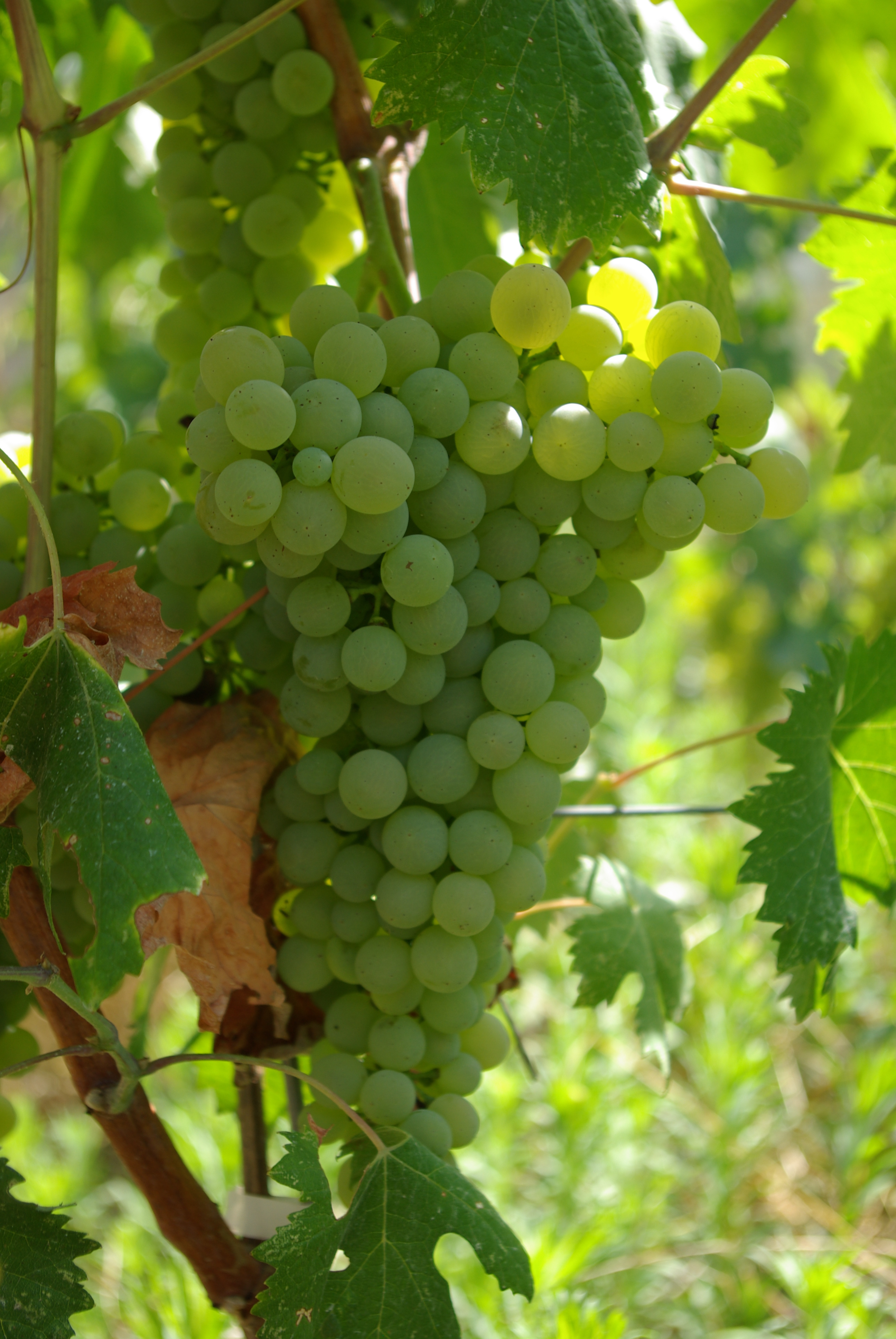
- Color of berry skin: Blanc
- Species: Vitis vinifera
- Also called: see list of synonyms
- Origin: Italy
- VIVC number: 12989

Vermentino is a light-skinned wine grape variety used primarily in Italian wines. It is widely planted in Sardinia, Liguria and Tuscany, to some extent in Corsica, in Piedmont under the name Favorita, and in increasing amounts in Languedoc-Roussillon. The leaves are dark green and pentagonal. The grapes are amber-yellow and hang in pyramidal bunches. The vines are often grown on slopes facing the sea where they can benefit from the additional reflected light. The Vitis International Variety Catalogue now gives Italy as its origin.

The most famous wine made from Vermentino is probably the DOCG Vermentino di Gallura (and Vermentino di Gallura Superiore), which is produced in the province of Olbia-Tempio, in the north of Sardinia. The grape is said to have been cultivated in this part of Gallura, often under the name Arratelau, since the 14th century. Elsewhere on the island, the grape is used for a variety of white wines, including sweet and sparkling variants.

== Origin ==
Different hypotheses about the origin of Vermentino have been put forward, and only recently has DNA typing confirmed Vermentino to be identical to the Pigato of Liguria and Favorita of Piedmont, superseding some earlier hypotheses. It is still unclear whether Vermentino is the same grape variety as Rollo, which is found in eastern Provence, near Nice. Both that variety and Vermentino go under the synonym Rolle.

== Wines ==
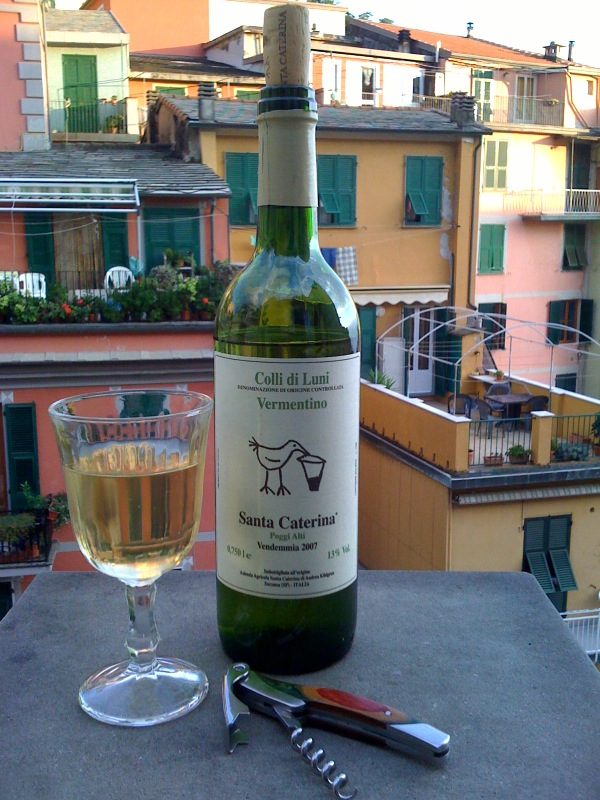
A Vermentino from the Colli di Luni DOC

Italian DOC wines include:

- Vermentino Di Sardegna (province of Sardinia)
- Riviera Ligure di Ponente Vermentino (provinces of Imperia and Savona, Liguria)
- Colli di Luni Vermentino (province of La Spezia in Liguria and the adjacent Tuscan province of Massa-Carrara)
- Candia dei Colli Apuani (province of Massa-Carrara, Tuscany)
- Bolgheri Vermentino (province of Livorno, Tuscany)
- Colli del Limbara IGT (Sardinia), blended with Retagliado bianco

French AOC wines include:

- Patrimonio, located in the north of Corsica, in the Saint Florent gulf, was the first region of the island to attain AOC status (in 1968). Its white wine is 100% Vermentino.
- In Languedoc-Roussillon, it has recently been allowed into many AOC wines, including Côtes du Roussillon.
- In Provence, close to Nice, the grape is used for the AOC white wines of Bellet.
- In California, Vermentino is grown and produced in the Adelaida District AVA by Tablas Creek Vineyard, in the Santa Ynez Valley AVA by Brick Barn Wine Estate, in the Carneros AVA by Mahoney Vineyards, in the Mokelumne River/Lodi AVA by m2 Wines, in the El Dorado AVA by Starfield Vineyards and in the Squaw Valley/Miramonte AVA by Sierra Peaks.
- In Southern Oregon, it is being grown in the Applegate Valley AVA by Troon Vineyard.
- In Southern Idaho, it is being grown in the Snake River Valley AVA by Famici Wine Company.

== Synonyms and confusion with other varieties ==
Vermentino is also known under the synonyms Agostenga, Agostenga blanc, Brustiano, Brustiano di Corsica, Carbes, Carbesso, Favorita, Favorita bianca, Favorita Bianca di Conegliano, Favorita d'Alba, Favorita di Alba, Favorita di Conegliano, Formentino, Fourmentin, Garbesso, Grosse Clarette, Malvasia a Bonifacio, Malvasia Grossa, Malvasie, Malvoisie, Malvoisie è Gros Grains, Malvoisie Corse, Malvoisie de Corse, Malvoisie Précoce d'Espagne, Piccabon, Piga, Pigato, Rolle, Rossese, Sibirkovski, Uva Sapaiola, Uva Vermentino, Valentin, Varlentin, Varresana bianca, Vennentino, Verlantin, Vermentini, Vermentino bianco, Vermentino Pigato, and Vermentinu.

Despite sharing several synonyms with Vermentino, the Corsican wine grape Brustiano bianco has no known relationship to the grape. Vermentino's exact relationship with the Tuscan grape Vermentino nero is not yet known though the variety may be a color mutation.

DNA analysis has demonstated that Vermentino, Ligurian Pigato, and Piedmont's Favorita share identical genetic profiles. Scientists now describe Pigato as a biotype or clone of Vermentino that accumulated mutations over centuries of cultivation in western Liguria, producing phenotypic differences in berry appearance, leaf morphology, and ultimately wine character, even though the underlying genome is the same.

In France, the same variety is known as Rolle.

== See also ==
- List of Italian grape varieties
