= Spanish wine regions =

Legal geographical indication systems for wines from Spain

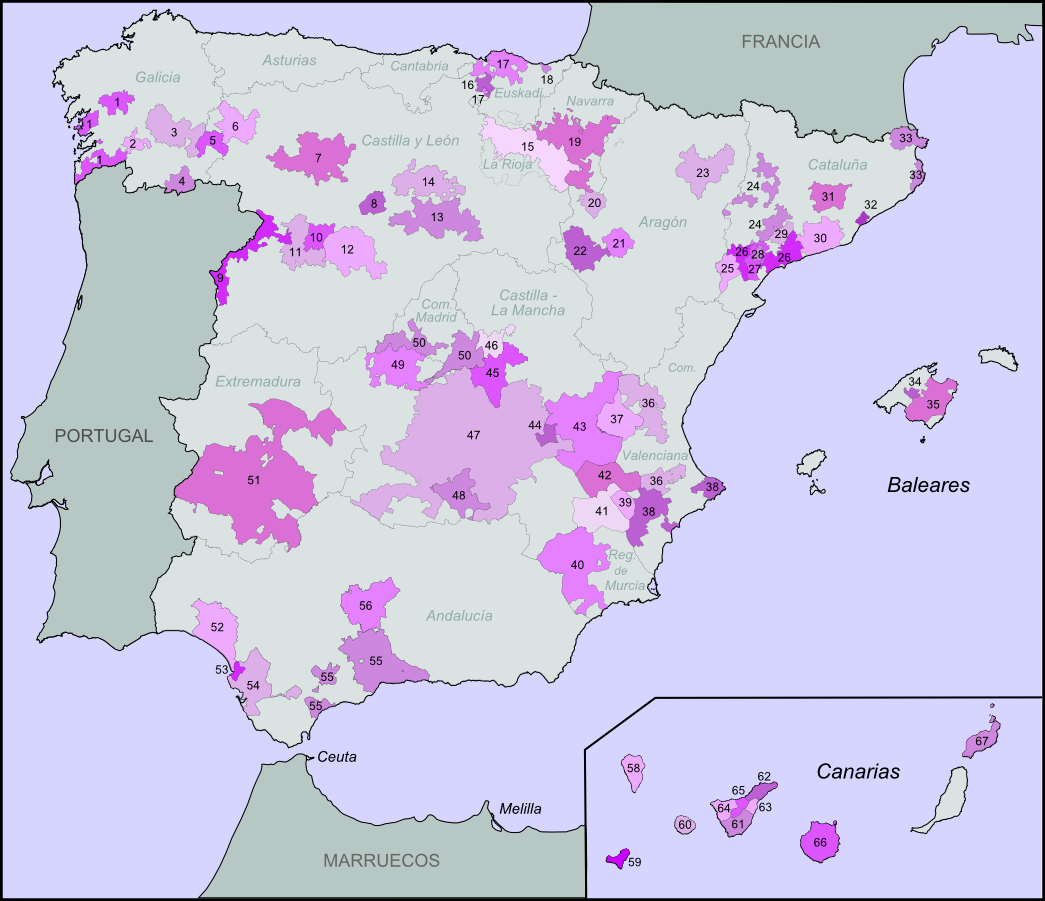
DO & DOCa wine regions of Spain

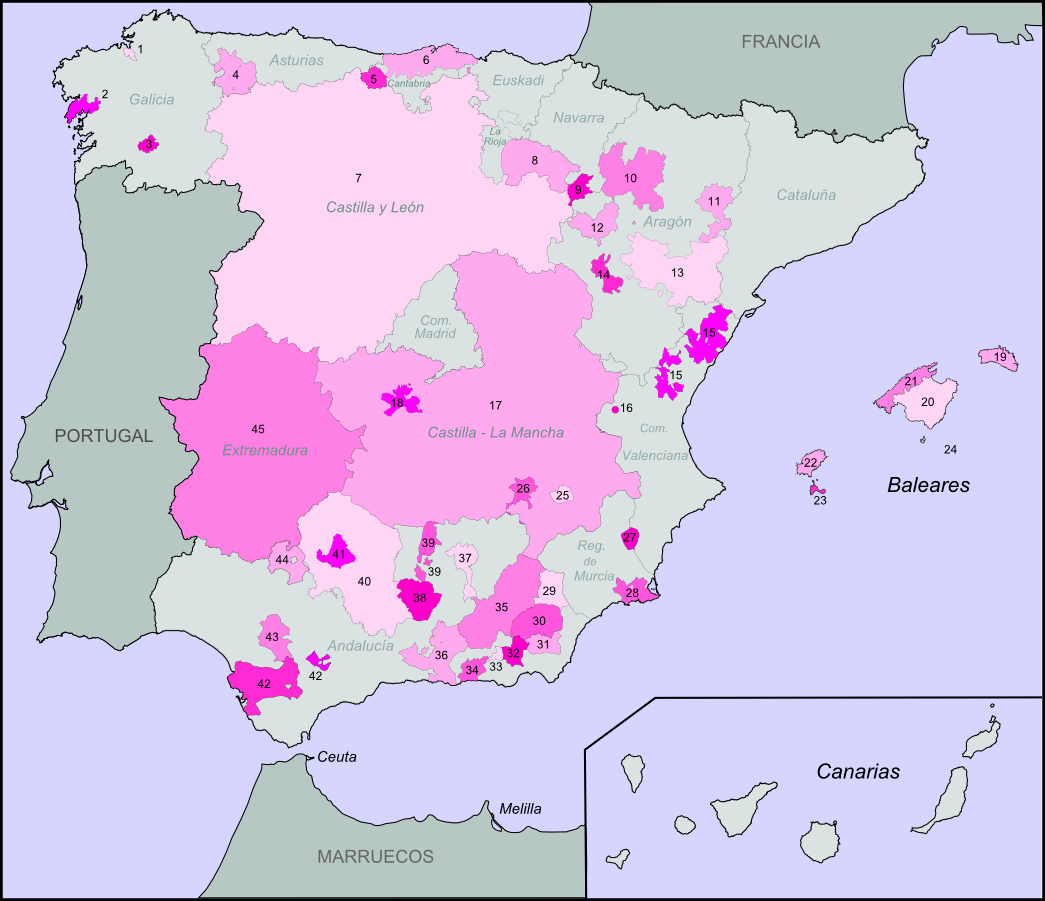
IGP wine regions of Spain

The mainstream quality wine regions in Spain are referred to as denominaciones de origen protegidas (DOP) (similar to the French Appellations) and the wine they produce is regulated for quality according to specific laws, and in compliance with European Commission Regulation (CE) 753/2002. In 2016, the use of the term Denominación de Origen (DO) was updated to Denominación de Origen Protegida (DOP) by the Spanish Ministry of Agriculture, Fisheries and Food (MAPA – Ministerio de Agricultura, Pesca y Alimentación); the traditional term of DO can still be used legally on labels, but it will eventually be replaced by DOP.

The wine region classification in Spain takes a quite complex hierarchical form in which the denominación de origen protegida is a mainstream grading, equivalent to the French AOC and the Italian DOC. As of 2019, Spain has 138 identifiable wine regions under some form of geographical classification (2 DOCa/DOQ, 68 DO, 7 VC, 19 VP, and 42 VT). The Spanish DO is actually a subset of the EU-sponsored QWPSR (Quality Wine Produced in Specific Regions) regulatory code (vino de calidad producido en región determinada (VCPRD) in Spanish) which Spain formally adopted in 1986, upon accession to the (then) EEC. The Spanish appellation hierarchy was most recently updated in 2016, and is as follows:

- DOP – denominación de origen protegida ('protected denomination of origin'), is the mainstay of Spain's wine quality control system. Each region is governed by a consejo regulador, which decides on the boundaries of the region, permitted varietals, maximum yields, limits of alcoholic strength and other quality standards or production limitations pertaining to the zone. As of 2019 there are 96 DOPs that are subdivided into DOCa, DO, VP, and VC. The sub-categories can be called DOP, or they can use the traditional terms of DOCa, DO, VP, and VC.
- DOCa – denominación de origen calificada ('denomination of qualified origin'), is the highest category in Spanish wine regulations, reserved for regions with above-average grape prices and particularly stringent quality controls. Rioja was the first Spanish region to be awarded DOCa status in 1991, followed by Priorat in 2003. Priorat uses the Catalan language DOQ, for denominació d'origen qualificada. These are the only two regions considered "above" DO status.
- DO – denominación de origin, the mainstay of Spain's wine quality control system. Each region is governed by a consejo regulador, which decides on the boundaries of the region, permitted varietals, maximum yields, limits of alcoholic strength and other quality standards or production limitations pertaining to the zone.
- VP – vino de pago ('estate wine'), a special term for high-quality, single-estate wines (pago is a Spanish term for a vineyard estate) which in some cases also have DO or VC or IGP appellations. This category was formed in 2003.
- VC – vino de Calidad con indicación geográfica ('quality wine with geographic indication'), a category formed in 2003 along with VP. The VC category is used for wines that do not fully meet the stringent standards of the DO category, but are above the standards of the IGP category.
- IGP – indicación geográfica protegida ('protected geographic indication'). This is below the DOP level, and is wine originating from a specific place, a region or a country, which has a certain quality, reputation or other characteristic - including production phases - that can be essentially attributed to its geographical origin, at least one of which takes place in the defined geographical area. These can use the traditional term Vino de la Tierra (VT).
- VdM – vino de mesa ('table wine'), the catch-all at the bottom of the pyramid, for all wine from unclassified vineyards, and wine that has been declassified by blending. This includes both inexpensive jug wines and some expensive wines that are not yet classified due to innovation outside traditional lines.

In 2006 a new Vino de la Tierra "super-region" was created called Viñedos de España. This was never ratified by the EU, and it was abolished in 2011.

Although almost all wine regions are confined to specific centres of production, some of the top denominaciones (Cava and Rioja in particular) are the product of more than one Autonomous Community. This is in contrast to Vinos de Pago, where the location criteria are very strict indeed, often centering on specific plots of land and admitting only those wines produced in their immediate vicinity.

== List of Spanish Denominaciones de Origen Protegido and Vinos de la Tierra by Community ==
Autonomous Community	Denominación de Origen Protegido (DOP) Vino de Calidad con Indicación Geográfica (VC) (DOCa and Vino de Pago in bold)	IGP / Vinos de la Tierra (VT)
Andalusia	Condado de Huelva; Granada; Jerez-Xeres-Sherry; Lebrija (VC); Málaga (wine); Manzanilla-Sanlúcar de Barrameda; Montilla-Moriles; Sierras de Málaga	Altiplano de Sierra Nevada; Bailén; Cádiz; Córdoba; Cumbres del Guadalfeo; Desierto de Almería; Laderas del Genil; Laujar-Alpujarra; Los Palacios; Norte de Almería; Ribera del Andarax; Sierra Norte de Sevilla; Sierra Sur de Jaén; Sierras de Las Estancias y Los Filabres; Torreperogil; Villaviciosa de Córdoba
Aragon	Calatayud; Campo de Borja; Cariñena; Somontano; Cava (multi-regional) **Pago Aylés** (Vino de Pago)	Bajo Aragón; Ribera del Gállego-Cinco Villas; Ribera del Jiloca; Ribera del Queiles (multi-regional); Valdejalón; Valle del Cinca
Asturias	Cangas (VC)	(none)
Cantabria	(none)	Costa de Cantabria; Liébana
Castile and León	Arlanza; Arribes; Bierzo; Cigales; Ribera del Duero; Rueda; Sierra de Salamanca (VC); Tierra de León; Tierra del Vino de Zamora; Toro; Valles de Benavente (VC); Valtiendas (VC) Cava (multi-regional)	Castilla y León
Castile-La Mancha	Almansa; Campo de Calatrava; Jumilla (multi-regional); La Mancha; Manchuela; Méntrida; Mondéjar; Ribera del Júcar; Uclés; Valdepeñas **Campo de La Guardia** (Vino de Pago); **Casa del Blanco** (Vino de Pago); **Dehesa del Carrizal** (Vino de Pago); **Dominio de Valdepusa** (Vino de Pago); **Finca Élez** (Vino de Pago); **Guijoso** (Vino de Pago); **Pago Calzadilla** (Vino de Pago); **Pago Florentino** (Vino de Pago)	Castilla
Catalonia	Alella; Catalunya; Conca de Barberà; Costers del Segre; Empordà; Montsant; Penedès; Pla de Bages; **Priorat** (DOCa); Tarragona; Terra Alta; Cava (multi-regional)	(none)
Community of Madrid	Vinos de Madrid	(none)
Valencian Community	Alicante; Utiel-Requena; Valencia; Cava (multi-regional); **El Terrerazo** (Vino de Pago); **Los Balagueses** (Vino de Pago)	Castelló
Extremadura	Ribera del Guadiana; Cava (multi-regional)	Extremadura
Galicia	Monterrei; Rías Baixas; Ribeira Sacra; Ribeiro; Valdeorras	Barbanza e Iria; Betanzos; Ribeiras do Morrazo; Valle del Miño-Orense
Balearic Islands	Binissalem; Plà i Llevant	Formentera; Ibiza; Illes Balears; Mallorca; Isla de Menorca; Serra de Tramuntana-Costa Nord
Canary Islands	Abona; El Hierro; Gran Canaria; La Gomera; La Palma; Lanzarote; Tacoronte-Acentejo; Valle de Güímar; Valle de la Orotava; Ycoden-Daute-Isora	Canary Islands
Foral Community of Navarre	Navarra; **Rioja** (DOCa); Cava (multi-regional); **Pago de Arínzano** (Vino de Pago); **Otazu** (Vino de Pago); **Prado de Irache** (Vino de Pago)	Ribera del Queiles (multi-regional); 3 Riberas
Basque Country	Txacolí de Bizcaia; Txacolí de Getaria; Txacolí de Álava; **Rioja Alavesa** (DOCa); Cava (multi-regional)	(none)
Murcia	Bullas; Jumilla (multi-regional); Yecla	Campo de Cartagena; Murcia
La Rioja	**Rioja** (DOCa) Cava (multi-regional)	Valles de Sadacia
