= Pago Los Cerrillos =

Branch of Spanish winery

Coordinates: 39°03′26.8″N 3°1′25″W

- Wine region
- Pago los Cerrillos lies geographically within the La Mancha DOP in the province of Ciudad Real in the region of Castilla–La Mancha
- Official name: Denominación de Origen Protegida Pago Los Cerrillos / Vino de Pago Los Cerrillos
- Type: Denominación de Origen Protegida (DOP) / Vino de Pago (VP)
- Year established: 2019
- Country: Spain
- No. of wineries: 1

Pago Los Cerrillos is a branch of Montalvo Wilmot Wineries, a Spanish winery in Castilla–La Mancha, Spain. The Pago Los Cerrillos branch uses the Vino de Pago wine appellation, a classification for Spanish wine applied to individual vineyards or wine estates, unlike the Denominación de Origen Protegida (DOP) or Denominación de Origen Calificada (DOCa) which is applied to an entire wine region. The Pago Los Cerrillos was formed as a Vino de Pago in 2019, and geographically it lies within the extent of the La Mancha DOP appellation. The Montalvo Wilmot Wineries also produce Spanish wines under the Vino de la Tierra de Castilla (IGP) appellation.
