= La Jaraba (Vino de Pago) =

Spanish winery in Castilla–La Mancha

Coordinates: 39°20′3.9″N 2°32′8.4″W

Pago de La Jaraba
- Wine region
- Pago de La Jaraba lies geographically within the La Mancha DOP in the province of Ciudad Real in the region of Castilla–La Mancha
- Official name: Denominación de Origen Protegida Pago de La Jaraba / Vino de Pago de La Jaraba
- Type: Denominación de Origen Protegida (DOP) / Vino de Pago (VP)
- Year established: 2019
- Country: Spain
- Size of planted vineyards: 80 hectares (198 acres)
- Varietals produced: Red: Tempranillo, Graciano, Cabernet Sauvignon, Merlot. Whites: Sauvignon Blanc
- No. of wineries: 1

Pago de La Jaraba is a Spanish winery in Castilla–La Mancha, Spain. The winery uses the Vino de Pago wine appellation, a classification for Spanish wine applied to individual vineyards or wine estates, unlike the Denominación de Origen Protegida (DOP) or Denominación de Origen Calificada (DOCa) which is applied to an entire wine region. The Pago de La Jaraba winery was formed as a Vino de Pago in 2019, and geographically it lies within the extent of the La Mancha DOP. The winery also produces artisan Manchego cheese under the D.O.P. queso manchego appellation.

== See also ==
- List of Spanish cheeses
