= Arínzano =

Wine regions of Spain

Coordinates: 42°37′49.2″N 1°59′37.5″W

Pago de Arínzano
- Wine region
- The Pago de Arínzano estate is geographically within the Navarra DOP region of Navarre
- Official name: Denominación de Origen Protegida Pago de Arínzano / Vino de Pago de Arínzano
- Type: Denominación de Origen Protegida (DOP) / Vino de Pago (VP)
- Country: Spain
- No. of wineries: 1

Pago de Arínzano is a wine estate that uses the Vino de Pago wine appellation, a classification for Spanish wine applied to individual vineyards or wine estates, unlike the Denominación de Origen Protegida (DOP) or Denominación de Origen Calificada (DOCa) which is applied to an entire wine region. This Vino de Pago is located in the municipality of Aberin (Merindad de Estella), in the Foral Community of Navarra, Spain, and is geographically within the borders of the Navarra DOP. The 300 hectares (740 acres) estate was purchased by the Chivite family in 1988 and was operated by Bodegas Chivite until it was sold in 2015 to a multinational drinks firm, SPI Group.

== Authorised Grape Varieties ==
The authorised grape varieties are:

- Red: Cabernet Sauvignon, Tempranillo, and Merlot
- White: Chardonnay
