= Prado de Irache =

Coordinates: 42°39′2.4″N 2°2′39.7″W

Pago Irache
- Wine region
- The Pago Irache estate is geographically within the Navarra DOP region of Navarre
- Official name: Denominación de Origen Protegida Pago Irache / Vino de Pago Irache
- Type: Denominación de Origen Protegida (DOP) / Vino de Pago (VP)
- Country: Spain
- No. of wineries: 1

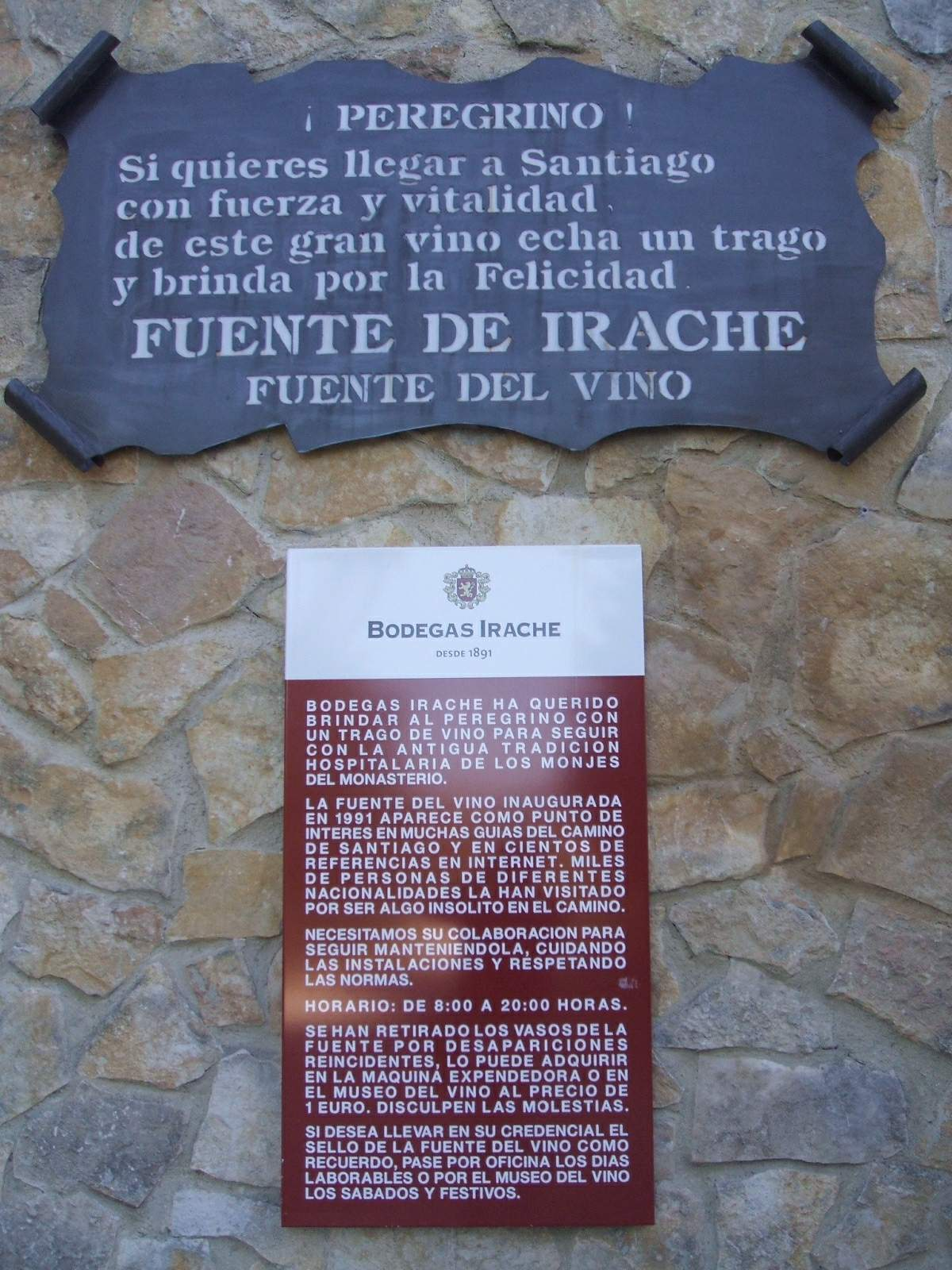
Wine fountain of Bodegas Irache

Pago Irache is a branch of Bodegas Irache, a Spanish winery in Navarre, Spain. The Pago Irache branch uses the Vino de Pago wine appellation, a classification for Spanish wine applied to individual vineyards or wine estates, unlike the Denominación de Origen Protegida (DOP) or Denominación de Origen Calificada (DOCa) which is applied to an entire wine region. This Vino de Pago is located in the municipality of Aberin (Merindad de Estella), in the Foral Community of Navarra, Spain, and is geographically within the borders of the Navarra DOP. This Vino de Pago is located in the municipality of Ayegui, near the town of Estella in the Foral Community of Navarra, Spain, and is geographically within the borders of the Navarra DOP. The winery, Bodegas Irache, also sells wines under the Navarra DOP appellation.

== Authorised Grape Varieties ==
The authorised grape varieties are:

- Red: Tempranillo, Cabernet Sauvignon, and Merlot
- White: Chardonnay
