= Vera de Estenas =

Winery in Spain

Coordinates: 39°33′03.2″N 1°10′43.4″W

Pago Vera de Estenas
- Wine region
- Pago Vera de Estenas lies geographically within the Utiel-Requena DOP in the region of Valencia
- Official name: Denominación de Origen Protegida Pago Vera de Estenas / Vino de Pago Vera de Estenas
- Type: Denominación de Origen Protegida (DOP) / Vino de Pago (VP)
- Year established: 2013
- Country: Spain
- No. of wineries: 1

Pago Vera de Estenas is a branch of Vera de Estenas Viñedos y Bodegas, a Spanish winery in Valencia, Spain. The Pago Vera de Estenas branch uses the Vino de Pago wine appellation, a classification for Spanish wine applied to individual vineyards or wine estates, unlike the Denominación de Origen Protegida (DOP) or Denominación de Origen Calificada (DOCa) which is applied to an entire wine region. The Pago de Los Balagueses was formed as a Vino de Pago in 2011, and geographically it lies within the extent of the Utiel-Requena DOP. The first wine produced under the Vino de Pago appellation was in 2013, with the release of Martínez Bermell-Merlot 2013, A Merlot varietal wine.

The Vera de Estenas Viñedos y Bodegas winery also produces Cava under the Cava DOP appellation, and still wines under the Utiel-Requena DOP appellation.
