= Casa del Blanco =

Spanish winery

Coordinates: 38°57′22″N 3°24′17″W

Pago Casa del Blanco
- Wine region
- Pago Casa del Blanco lies geographically within the La Mancha DOP in the province of Ciudad Real in the region of Castilla–La Mancha
- Official name: Denominación de Origen Protegida Casa del Blanco / Vino de Pago Casa del Blanco
- Type: Denominación de Origen Protegida (DOP) / Vino de Pago (VP)
- Year established: 2010
- Country: Spain
- Size of planted vineyards: 150 hectares (371 acres)
- Varietals produced: Red: Tempranillo, Cabernet Sauvignon, Merlot, Syrah, Petit Verdot, Malbec, Cabernet Franc, Garnacha. Whites: Airén, Tempranillo, Sauvignon Blanc, Chardonnay, Moscatel de Grano Menudo
- No. of wineries: 1

Pago Casa del Blanco is a Spanish winery in Castilla–La Mancha, Spain. The winery uses the Vino de Pago wine appellation, a classification for Spanish wine applied to individual vineyards or wine estates, unlike the Denominación de Origen Protegida (DOP) or Denominación de Origen Calificada (DOCa) which is applied to an entire wine region. The Pago Casa del Blanco winery was formed as a Vino de Pago in 2003, and geographically it lies within the extent of the La Mancha DOP. The winery in fact sells wine under the Vino de Pago appellation as Pago Casa del Blanco, and under the I.G.P. "Vino de la Tierra de Castilla" appellation.
