= Otazu =

Coordinates: 42°47′10″N 1°46′51.5″W

Pago de Otazu
- Wine region
- The Pago de Otazu estate is geographically within the Navarra DOP region, Navarre.
- Official name: Denominación de Origen Protegida Pago de Otazu / Vino de Pago de Otazu
- Type: Denominación de Origen Protegida (DOP) / Vino de Pago (VP)
- Year established: 2009
- Country: Spain
- No. of wineries: 1

Pago de Otazu is a branch of Bodega Otazu, a Spanish winery in Navarre, Spain. The Pago de Otazu branch uses the Vino de Pago wine appellation, a classification for Spanish wine applied to individual vineyards or wine estates, unlike the Denominación de Origen Protegida (DOP) or Denominación de Origen Calificada (DOCa) which is applied to an entire wine region. This Vino de Pago is located in the municipality of Echauri, a village only 8 km from Pamplona, the capital of the Foral Community of Navarra, Spain, and it is geographically within the borders of the Navarra DOP. The winery, Bodega Otazu, also sells wines under the Navarra DOP appellation.

== Authorised grape varieties ==
The authorised grape varieties are:

- Red: Tempranillo, Merlot, and Cabernet Sauvignon
- White: Chardonnay
