= Pago Calzadilla =

Spanish winery

Coordinates: 40°08′31.4″N 2°39′16.7″W

- Wine region
- Pago Calzadilla lies geographically within the Uclés DOP in the province of Cuenca in the region of Castilla–La Mancha
- Official name: Denominación de Origen Protegida Pago Calzadilla / Vino de Pago Calzadilla
- Type: Denominación de Origen Protegida (DOP) / Vino de Pago (VP)
- Year established: 2011
- Country: Spain
- Size of planted vineyards: 22 hectares (54 acres)
- Varietals produced: Red: Tempranillo, Garnacha, Cabernet Sauvignon, Syrah
- No. of wineries: 1

Pago Calzadilla is a Spanish winery in Castilla–La Mancha, Spain. The winery uses the Vino de Pago wine appellation, a classification for Spanish wine applied to individual vineyards or wine estates, unlike the Denominación de Origen Protegida (DOP) or Denominación de Origen Calificada (DOCa) which is applied to an entire wine region. The Pago Calzadilla winery was formed as a Vino de Pago in 2011, and geographically it lies within the extent of the Uclés DOP. At just 22 hectares, Pago Calzadilla is the smallest wine DOP in Spain.
