= Vino de Pago =

Classification for Spanish wine applied to individual vineyards or wine estates

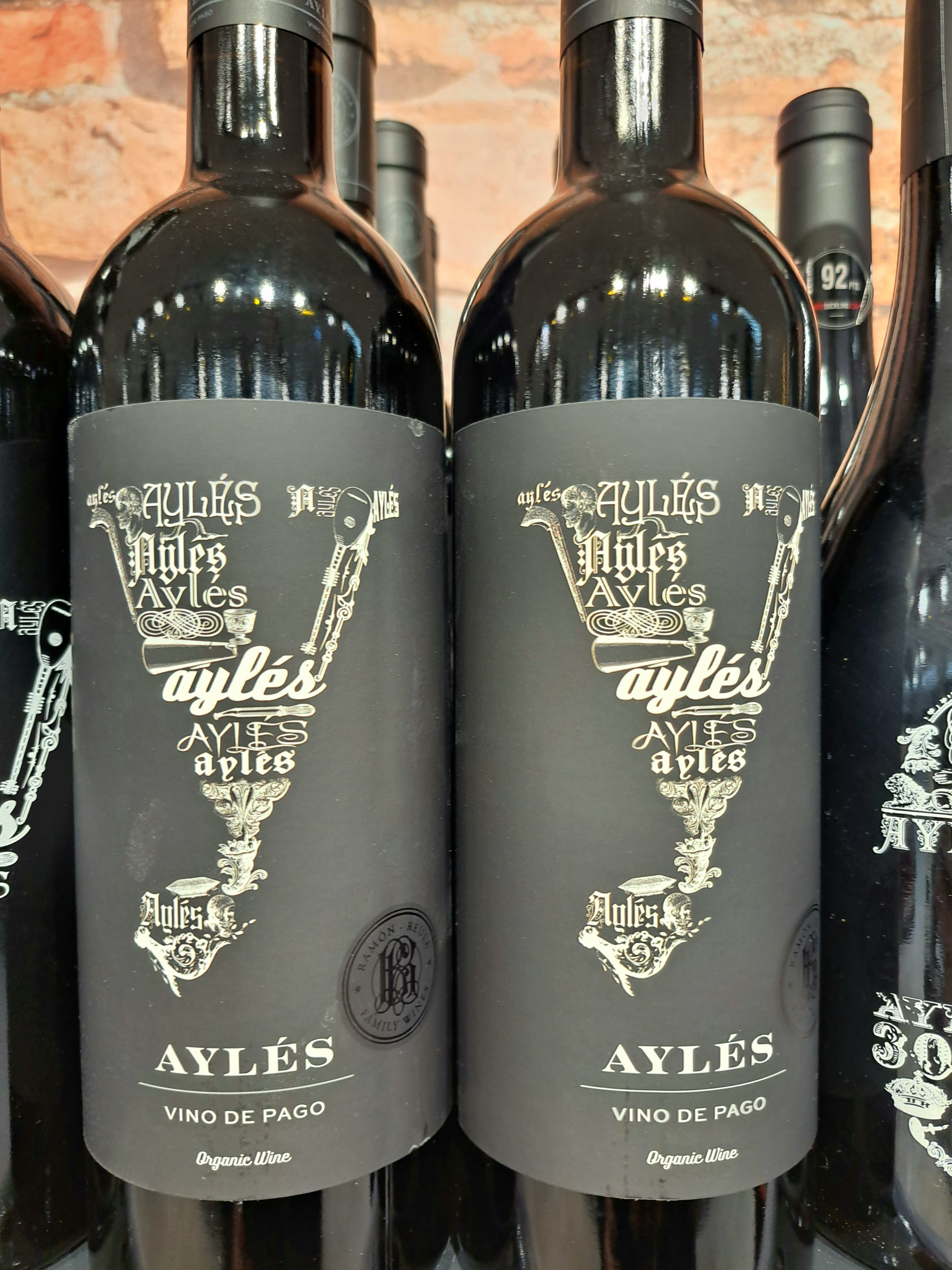
Vino de Pago (estate wine) Aylés

Vino de Pago is a classification for Spanish wine applied to individual vineyards or wine estates, unlike the Denominación de Origen Protegida (DOP) or Denominación de Origen Calificada (DOCa) which is applied to an entire wine region. The Vino de Pago classification was introduced in 2003 by a decision in the Cortes Generales, the Spanish parliament, to help further improve the quality of Spanish wine. As of 2021, there were 20 Vinos de Pago.

The quality requirements for a Vino de Pago correspond to those for a DOCa wine, and wine estates that are classified as Vino de Pago are subject to separate requirements rather than those of the wine region where they are located. One of the requirements is that the estate may only use their own grapes for their wines. The Spanish word pago comes from the Latin word pagus, meaning a country district.

When introduced, the new regulation met with particular interest in Castilla-La Mancha, where the first Vinos de Pago were created. So far, all Vinos de Pago are located in Aragon, Castilla-La Mancha, Castilla y León, Navarra and Valencia.

== List of Vinos de Pago ==
Name	Location	Region	Year	Area (ha)
Dominio de Valdepusa (Marques de Griñón)	Toledo	Castilla-La Mancha	2003	50
Finca Élez (Manuel Manzaneque)	Albacete	Castilla-La Mancha	2003	39
Guijoso	Albacete	Castilla-La Mancha	2004	99
Dehesa del Carrizal	Ciudad Real	Castilia-La Mancha	2006	22
Arínzano	Navarra	Navarra	2007	128
Prado de Irache	Navarra	Navarra	2008	16
Otazu	Navarra	Navarra	2008	92
Campo de la Guardia	Toledo	Castilla-La Mancha	2009	81
Pago Florentino	Ciudad Real	Castilla-La Mancha	2009	58
Casa del Blanco	Ciudad Real	Castilla-La Mancha	2010	93
El Terrerazo	Utiel-Requena	Valencia	2010	89
Pago Calzadilla	Huete	Castilla-La Mancha	2011	26
Pago Aylés	Ayles	Aragon	2010	70
Pago de Los Balagueses	Utiel-Requena	Valencia	2011	18
Vera de Estenas	Utiel	Valencia	2013	45
El Pago de Vallegarcía	Ciudad Real	Castilla-La Mancha	2019	31
Pago de La Jaraba	Cuenca	La Mancha	2019	80
Pago Los Cerrillos	Ciudad Real	Castilla-La Mancha	2019	?
Pago del Vicario	Ciudad Real	Castilla-La Mancha	2020	130
