= Pago Aylés =

Wine of Spain

Coordinates: 41°24′01″N 1°04′5″W

- Wine region
- Pago Aylés lies geographically within the Cariñena DOP in the province of Zaragoza in the region of Aragon
- Official name: Denominación de Origen Protegida Aylés / Vino de Pago Aylés
- Type: Denominación de Origen Protegida (DOP) / Vino de Pago (VP)
- Year established: 2003
- Country: Spain
- Size of planted vineyards: 47 hectares (116 acres)
- Varietals produced: Garnacha, Tempranillo, Cabernet Sauvignon, Merlot
- No. of wineries: 1

The Pago Aylés estate lies geographically within the extent of the Cariñena DOP

Pago Aylés is a branch of Finca Aylés, a Spanish winery in Aragón, Spain. The Pago Aylés branch uses the Vino de Pago wine appellation, a classification for Spanish wine applied to individual vineyards or wine estates, unlike the Denominación de Origen Protegida (DOP) or Denominación de Origen Calificada (DOCa) which is applied to an entire wine region. The Pago Aylés winery was formed as a Vino de Pago in 2003, and geographically it lies within the extent of the Cariñena DOP. Along with the Vino de Pago appellation, the winery sells wines under the Cariñena DOP appellation as Bodega Aylés Demba wines.
