= Pago Florentino =

Wine region of Spain

- Wine region
- Type: Vino de Pago
- Country: Spain

Pago Florentino is a Vino de Pago from Spain. This means that in addition to having a proven track record of consistent quality, the wines have to be both produced from estate-grown grapes and also have to be processed and aged in a winery (bodega) located on the estate.

This Vino de Pago is located in the municipality of Malagón, in the province of Ciudad Real (Castile-La Mancha, Spain), and acquired its status on 20 August 2009.

== The Estate ==
The 58 hectare estate, known as La Solana, belongs to the Arzuaga group and contains the following red grape varieties: Tempranillo, Syrah and Petit Verdot. It was purchased in 1997 but the first wine was not made until 2002.

The planting density is between 1,300 and 3,000 vines/hectare, and the maximum authorised yield is 10,000 kg/ha for the three varieties.

The minimum alcohol content is 12.5º, and the wines must contain a minimum of 90% Tempranillo.
