= Mondéjar (DO) =

Wine-growing region in central Spain

Coordinates: 40°19′26″N 3°06′30″W

Mondéjar DOP
- Wine region
- Mondéjar DOP in the province of Guadalajara in the region of Castile-La Mancha
- Official name: D.O.P. Mondéjar
- Type: Denominación de Origen Protegida (DOP)
- Year established: 1996
- Country: Spain
- Size of planted vineyards: 446 hectares (1,102 acres)
- No. of wineries: 2
- Wine produced: 1,519 hectolitres
- Comments: Data for 2016 / 2017

Mondéjar is a Spanish Denominación de Origen Protegida (DOP) for wines located in the southeast corner of the province of Guadalajara (Castile-La Mancha, Spain), around the town of Mondéjar. It covers 19 municipalities, the most important one being Sacedón.

== History ==
Wine has been produced in this area for centuries, due to the strategic position that Mondéjar occupies on the road between Madrid and Valencia. The traditional market for the wines was strictly local. Originally, Mondéjar wines were classified as Vinos de la Tierra, but they acquired official DO status in 1997.

== Climate ==
Surprisingly, despite being in the centre of the Iberian peninsula, the area around Mondéjar possesses a Mediterranean climate due to the easterly winds and the altitude. Even so, temperatures in summer are high (40°C max) and low in winter (-8°C max) with strong possibilities of frost even in April. Average annual rainfall is 500 mm.

== Soils ==
The land covered by Mondéjar DOP is generally gentle rolling hills. It borders on the Vinos de Madrid DOP to the west and on the La Mancha DOP to the south. The vineyards are at a height of about 800 m above sea level. In the southeast, around the town of Mondéjar itself, the vines are planted on red soil on lime bearing clay sediments, not very rocky and rich in potassium. In the north, around the town of Sacedón, the soils are dark, on marl, sandy and poor in nitrogen, magnesium and phosphates. In both zones, the subsoil is deep, has good permeability and is poor in organic matter.

== Authorised Grape Varieties ==
The authorised grape varieties are:

- Red: Tempranillo, Cabernet Sauvignon, Syrah, and Garnacha
- White: Macabeo, Malvar, Sauvignon Blanc, and Torrontés

== Viticulture ==
The first leaf burst on the vines is in mid-March and the leaves start to fall at the beginning of November. 50% of the vines covered by the DOP are over 25 years old and produce an average of 5–6 kg/vine. The vine planting density is low at an average of 1,100 vines/ha.
