= Guijoso =

Spanish wine region

- Wine region
- Type: Vino de Pago
- Country: Spain

Guijoso is a Vino de Pago from Spain. This is the highest category on the quality scale of Spanish wines and means that in addition to having a proven track record of consistent quality, the wines have to be both produced from estate-grown grapes and also have to be processed and aged in a winery (bodega) located on the estate.

The winery and vineyards are in the Guijoso estate, located in the municipality of El Bonillo, in the province of Albacete (Castile-La Mancha, Spain) and acquired its status in April 2005. It is very close to the Lagunas de Ruidera, an area of wetlands and natural reserve, and is the source of the river Pinilla.

The whole estate is about 3,000 ha in area. About half this area is cultivated and the other half is low mountain scrubland used for hunting. There are installations on the estate for livestock, olives, vines and the winery.

== History ==
The first vines were planted in 1985, and the first wine released to the market was in 1990 with Cabernet Sauvignon grapes. The winery (bodega) was inaugurated in 1993.

== Vineyards ==
At a height of about 1,000 m above sea level, the vineyards cover an area of 72 ha. The main white varieties planted are Chardonnay and Sauvignon blanc. The main red varieties are Cabernet Sauvignon, Merlot, Tempranillo and Syrah.

The vines are planted on trellises (en espaldera) and have a drip irrigation system.

As required by the legislation, the grapes used in making the estate wine must be grown on the estate itself.

== Climate ==
The climate is continental (long hot dry summers, very cold winters).
