= Finca Élez =

- Wine region
- Type: Vino de Pago
- Country: Spain

Finca Élez is a Vino de Pago from Spain. This is the highest category on the quality scale of Spanish wines and means that in addition to having a proven track record of consistent quality, the wines have to be both produced from estate-grown grapes and also have to be processed and aged in a winery (bodega) located on the estate. This Vino de Pago is located in the municipality of El Bonillo, in the province of Albacete (Castile-La Mancha, Spain) and acquired its status in 2002.

== The Estate ==
Finca Élez, founded by Manuel Manzaneque, has 40 hectares (99 acres) planted under vines of the following varieties: chardonnay, cabernet sauvignon, merlot, tempranillo and syrah.

The winery is located next to the vineyards at an elevation of 1,080 m above sea level in the Sierra de Alcaraz mountain range.

== Climate ==
The climate is continental (hot, dry summers; cold winters) with marked differences between daytime and nighttime temperatures.

== Soils ==
The soils are mainly clay-sand, with some other elements such as lime, marls and ochre clays.

== Production ==
Approximately 200,000 bottles/year.
