= Dominio de Valdepusa =

- Wine region
- Dominio de Valdepusa in the province of Toledo in the region of the Castile-La Mancha
- Type: Vino de Pago
- Country: Spain

Dominio de Valdepusa is a Vino de Pago from Spain. This is the highest category on the quality scale of Spanish wines and means that in addition to having a proven track record of consistent quality, the wines have to be both produced from estate-grown grapes and also have to be processed and aged in a winery (bodega) located on the estate. This Vino de Pago is located in the municipality of Malpica de Tajo, in the province of Toledo (Castile-La Mancha, Spain) and acquired its status in 2003.

== History ==
The Casadevacas Estate (Finca Casadevacas) estate on which the vineyards and winery are located has been in the family of Carlos Falcó y Fernández de Córdova, the Marqués de Griñón since the 13th century. The vineyards, in three separate plots, were first planted in 1974 (14 ha of Cabernet Sauvignon) a pioneering experiment at that time and in 1991 2.5 ha of Petit Verdot and 5 ha of Syrah vines were planted. There are currently 40 ha planted to Cabernet Sauvignon, Petit Verdot, Syrah, Merlot. The modern, partly subterranean air-conditioned winery was built inside an existing 18th century building in 1989.

== Climate ==
The climate is continental, with extreme contrasts not only between the hot dry summer and cold winter, but also between day and night in each season. The mean annual temperature is 17°C ranging from 5° in winter to 26°C in summer. The mean annual rainfall is 400 mm, and the vines receive around 2,800 hours of sunlight per annum.

== Soil ==
The soils are clay and lime.

== Vineyards ==
The vineyards are at an altitude of 490 m above sea level. The Australian Richard Smart designed the vineyard canopy management system, which is labour-intensive but which has the result of increasing the quality of the wine. Drip irrigation, uniform sunshine on bunches and leaves. The maximum authorised yields are:

- 10000 kg/ha for Cabernet Sauvignon
- 12000 kg/ha for Petit Verdot
- 13000 kg/ha for Syrah
