= Islas Canarias (Vino de la Tierra) =

Spanish wine designation

Coordinates: 28°22′20.9″N 16°39′08.2″W

Islas Canarias DOP
- Wine region
- Official name: Denominación de Origen Protegida Islas Canarias / Vino de Calidad Islas Canarias
- Type: Denominación de Origen Protegida (DOP) / Vino de Calidad (VC)
- Country: Spain
- No. of wineries: 21

Islas Canarias is a Spanish Denominación de Origen Protegida (DOP), traditionally called a Vino de calidad con Indicación Geográfica. This is one step below the mainstream Denominación de Origen quality wines and one step above the less stringent Vino de la Tierra wines on the quality ladder. It encompasses all the Canary Islands.

== Authorised grape varieties ==
The authorised grape varieties are:

- Red: Vijariego Negro, Baboso Negro, Listán negro, Negramoll, Tintilla / Graciano
- White: Gual, Listán Blanco, Malvasía, Marmajuelo, Moscatel, Vijariego blanco, Verdello (grape)
