= Arzuaga =

Arzuaga is a Spanish surname. Notable people with the surname include:

- Amaya Arzuaga (born 1970), Spanish designer
- Juan Arzuaga (1880–1951), Spanish footballer and referee
- Manuel Rodríguez Arzuaga (1876–1952), Spanish versatile athlete and a football executive
- Martín Arzuaga (born 1981), Argentine footballer
