= Sierra de Salamanca =

Spanish wine designation

Coordinates: 40°29′33.6″N 6°03′11.9″W

Sierra de Salamanca DOP
- Wine region
- Official name: Denominación de Origen Protegida Sierra de Salamanca / Vino de Calidad Sierra de Salamanca
- Type: Denominación de Origen Protegida (DOP) / Vino de Calidad (VC)
- Year established: 2010
- Country: Spain
- No. of wineries: 6

Sierra de Salamanca is a Spanish Denominación de Origen Protegida (DOP), traditionally called a Vino de calidad con Indicación Geográfica. This is one step below the mainstream Denominación de Origen quality wines and one step above the less stringent Vino de la Tierra wines on the quality ladder. It is located in the province of Salamanca (region of Castile and León), and known for its red wines using the native Rufete grape.

== Authorised grape varieties ==
The authorised grape varieties are:

- Red: Rufete, Garnacha Tinta, and Tempranillo
- White: Viura, Moscatel de Grano Menudo, and Palomino
