= Campo de La Guardia =

Spanish wine designation

Campo de la Guardia
- Wine region
- Type: Vino de Pago
- Country: Spain

Campo de la Guardia is a Vino de Pago from Spain. This is the highest category on the quality scale of Spanish wines. In addition to having a proven track record of consistent quality, these wines must be both produced from estate-grown grapes and also processed and aged in a winery (bodega) located on the estate.

This Vino de Pago is located in the municipality of La Guardia, in the province of Toledo (Castile-La Mancha, Spain) and acquired its status on 20 August 2009.

== Estate ==
The 81-hectare estate belongs to Bodegas Martúe and contains the following red grape varieties: Cabernet Sauvignon, Merlot, Malbec, Tempranillo, Syrah, and Petit Verdot; the only white variety cultivated is Chardonnay.

The maximum authorised yield is 7.500 kg/ha for the Cabernet Sauvignon, 9.000 kg/ha for the Syrah and Malbec, 10.000 kg/ha for the Merlot and Petit Verdot, and 11.000 kg/ha for the Tempranillo.

The minimum alcohol content is 13°.
