= Dehesa del Carrizal =

Class of Spanish wine

Coordinates: 39°27′0″N 4°24′0″W

- Wine region
- Type: Vino de Pago
- Country: Spain

Dehesa del Carrizal is a Vino de Pago from Spain. This is the highest category on the quality scale of Spanish wines and means that in addition to having a proven track record of consistent quality, the wines have to be both produced from estate-grown grapes and also have to be processed and aged in a winery (bodega) located on the estate.

This Vino de Pago is located in Retuerta del Bullaque in the region of the Montes de Toledo, in the Province of Ciudad Real, Spain,

The first vineyard was planted back in 1987. Today the vineyard surface is about 28 hectares. Grape varieties planted are Cabernet Sauvignon, Syrah, Merlot, Petit Verdot, Tempranillo and Chardonnay. Its Cabernet Sauvignon is well known as one of the finest Cabernets ever made in Spain. As well as its Chardonnay.

Dehesa del Carrizal belongs to "Grandes Pagos de España" association.

== Montes de Toledo ==
It is the mountain range running east to west within the provinces of Toledo and Ciudad Real, between the topographical depressions of Tajo and Guadiana.

Many years went before these lands’ great ecological and landscape wealth was recognized, with two key dates in its history: 1885 marks the beginning of Madoz disentailment (where Dehesa del Carrizal is first named), and 1995 sees the declaration of Cabañeros National Park.

Bioclimatically and biogeographically the area is defined as siliceous Mediterranean mountains of the Southern Plateau, making it a rare mountainous configuration, very different from the neighbouring regions of Toledan Plateau (North), La Mancha (East), and Campo de Calatrava (South). Acidic soils, a more humid climate and its altitude (between 600 m in the hillsides to 1,400 m in the mountain tops) distinguish the region and the wines it produces.

== Vineyards and winery ==
In this natural environment, rich in botanical species and fauna, the first viticulture project of the Montes de Toledo was born in 1987 with the planting of 8 acres of Cabernet-Sauvignon vines, in Dehesa del Carrizal. These first 8 acres have become 28 today, where next to Cabernet-Sauvignon now grow Syrah, Merlot, Tempranillo, Petit Verdot and Chardonnay, all of them in the surroundings of the winery, and which in 2006 have been recognized with their own official Vino de Pago (then Denominación de Origen de Pago) designation.

The vineyards lay over a “raña” (local name for the hillsides at the foot of the Montes) composed of accumulated clay and quartzite pebble, formed from the mountain summit’s erosion during the Tertiary era. It is situated between 800 and 900 meters of altitude, north orientation. The vineyard is conducted in espaliers, with drip support irrigation. The unique climate of the region brings an average of 700 mm of rain per year, which together with the predominant thermic inversion causes slow and full ripenings, harvesting in some cases by November.

Vinification, aging and bottling is all done in the winery, in a 1999 building next to the vineyard. The winery has all the necessary facilities for high quality production: gravity barreling, temperature-controlled stainless steel tanks, air-conditioned warehouses for barrel and bottle aging, etc.

The production building is partially buried in the mountain, its front facing the social areas built in classic Moorish brick. The main room enjoys a large fireplace and can fit 100 people.

== Wines ==
- Dehesa del Carrizal Chardonnay,
- Dehesa del Carrizal MV Azul,
- Dehesa del Carrizal MV,
- Dehesa del Carrizal Syrah,
- Dehesa del Carrizal Cabernet Sauvignon,
- Dehesa del Carrizal Colección Privada
