= Pinilla =

Pinilla is a surname. Notable people with the surname include:

- Antonio Pinilla (born 1971), Spanish footballer
- Gustavo Rojas Pinilla (1900–1975), Colombian army general, civil engineer, and politician
- Jairo Pinilla (born 1944), Colombian film director
- Juan Pinilla (born 1981), Spanish flamenco singer, critic, writer, and columnist
- Mauricio Pinilla (born 1984), Chilean footballer
- Paola Pinilla, Colombian astrophysicist
