= El Terrerazo =

- Wine region
- Type: Vino de Pago
- Country: Spain

DOP El Terrerazo is a Spanish geographical indication for Vino de Pago wines produced in the estate of El Terrerazo located in the municipality of Utiel, in the province of Valencia in the autonomous community of Valencia, Spain. The sole proprietor of this estate is Bodega Mustiguillo.

Vino de Pago is the smallest category in the wine quality ladder in Spain. This geographic indication was regulated by the Generalitat Valenciana (Valencian Government) on September 10, 2010.

== Grape varieties ==
- Red: Bobal, Cabernet Sauvignon, Garnacha, Merlot, Syrah and Tempranillo
