= Aberin =

- Coat of arms

- Coordinates: 42°37′N 2°00′W
- Country: Spain
- Autonomous Community: Navarre
- Comarca: Estella Oriental

Government
  - Mayoress: Luis Enrique Aguilar Lizarraga

Area
  - Total: 21.25 km^{2} (8.20 sq mi)
- Elevation: 514 m (1,686 ft)

Population (2025-01-01)
  - Total: 410
- Time zone: UTC+1 (CET)
  - Summer (DST): UTC+2 (CEST)

Aberin is a municipality located in the province and autonomous community of Navarre, northern Spain.
