= Uclés (DO) =

Coordinates: 39°59′N 2°51′W

Uclés DO
- Wine region
- Uclés DO in the provinces of Cuenca and Toledo in the region of Castile-La Mancha
- Official name: D.O. Uclés
- Type: Denominación de Origen Protegida (DOP)
- Year established: 2003
- Country: Spain
- Size of planted vineyards: 1,700 hectares (4,201 acres)
- No. of wineries: 5
- Wine produced: 32,564 hectolitres
- Comments: Data for 2016 / 2017

Uclés is a Spanish Denominación de Origen Protegida (DOP) for wines located in the region of Castile-La Mancha (Spain), around the town of Uclés in the west of the province of Cuenca and in the northeast of the province of Toledo.

== History ==
In 2002 a number of local wine producers (bodegueros) formed a quality wine association. The area acquired its DO status in 2006.

== Climate ==
This DOP has a continental climate, i.e. long, hot dry summers and cold winters. Average annual rainfall is around 500 mm.

== Soils ==
The vineyards in Uclés DOP are located in three different geological areas:

- Sierra de Altomira. Abrupt landscape and presence of dolomitic limestone
- Western zone. Rolling landscape, comprising sediments, floodplain and valley floors
- Eastern zone. Intermediate depression, comprising ternary deposits

The soils are very varied, though they are mostly sandy, deep and generally not very fertile. Drainage is good and oxygen is available for the root systems of the vines. They are slightly more fertile near the rivers Riánsares and Bedija.

== Grape Varieties ==
Authorized grape varieties:

- Red: Tempranillo (known locally as Cencibel), Cabernet Sauvignon, Merlot, Syrah, and Garnacha
- White: Verdejo, Chardonnay, Moscatel de Grano Menudo, Sauvignon blanc, and Macabeo

Maximum yields, for red wines, are established depending on the age of the vines and on the planting system:

- ≥ 6 years, 8,000 kg/ha (low bush, en vaso) or 11,000 gk/ha (on trellis, en espaldera)
- ≥ 15 years, 6,500 kg/ha (low bush, en vaso) or 9,500 gk/ha (on trellis, en espaldera)
- ≥ 40 years, 5,000 kg/ha (low bush, en vaso) or 8,00 gk/ha (on trellis, en espaldera)

Vines less than 6 years old may not be used for making wine with the Uclés DOP label.
