= Navarra (DO) =

Spanish wine denomination

Coordinates: 42°28′52″N 1°39′2″E

Navarra DOP
- Wine region
- Navarra DOP in the region of Navarre
- Official name: D.O.P. Navarra
- Type: Denominación de Origen Protegida (DOP)
- Year established: 1933
- Country: Spain
- Sub-regions: Valdizarbe, Tierra Estella, Ribera Alta, Ribera Baja, Baja Montaña
- No. of vineyards: 10,774 hectares (26,623 acres)
- No. of wineries: 87
- Wine produced: 511,437 hectolitres
- Comments: Data for 2016 / 2017

Navarra is a Spanish Denominación de Origen Protegida (DOP) for wines from the southern half of the autonomous community of Navarre (Spanish Navarra, Basque Nafarroa). The vineyards are on the lower slopes of the Pyrenees as they descend towards the basin of the river Ebro.

The region used to be renowned only for its rosado wines but in recent years has been producing quality reds and whites as well.

== History ==
The earliest historical data on grape growing and wine production in Navarra dates from the 2nd century BC, when the ancient Romans built wineries (bodegas). Remains of winery equipment and installations have been found at the archaeological excavations in Arellano (Villa de la Musas), Falces, Lumbier and Muruzábal de Andion (Villa de Andelos).

In the Middle Ages, when Navarre was a powerful independent kingdom with close ties to France, viticulture prospered, partly due to the demand from the pilgrims on the Camino de Santiago (Way of St. James). In the 12th century, the wine from Navarre was recommended to pilgrims in guidebooks, and was also exported abroad.

Towards the end of the 18th century viticulture was the main agricultural activity of the region. In 1855 there was an outbreak of oidium which affected wine production, three years after a similar outbreak in the Bordeaux (France) region. However, in 1892, the phylloxera plague devastated the vineyards, destroying an estimated 98% of the 50,000 ha of vines planted at that time.

At the beginning of the 20th century, the vineyards were replanted by grafting onto New World rootstock. Wine cooperatives were formed and successfully increased production by exporting large quantities of wine in bulk.

During the 1980s private wineries and cooperatives began bottling and labelling quality wine. The statutes of the Denominación de Origen, which were originally approved in 1933, have been updated to reflect the shift of emphasis from bulk production to quality production.

== Geography ==
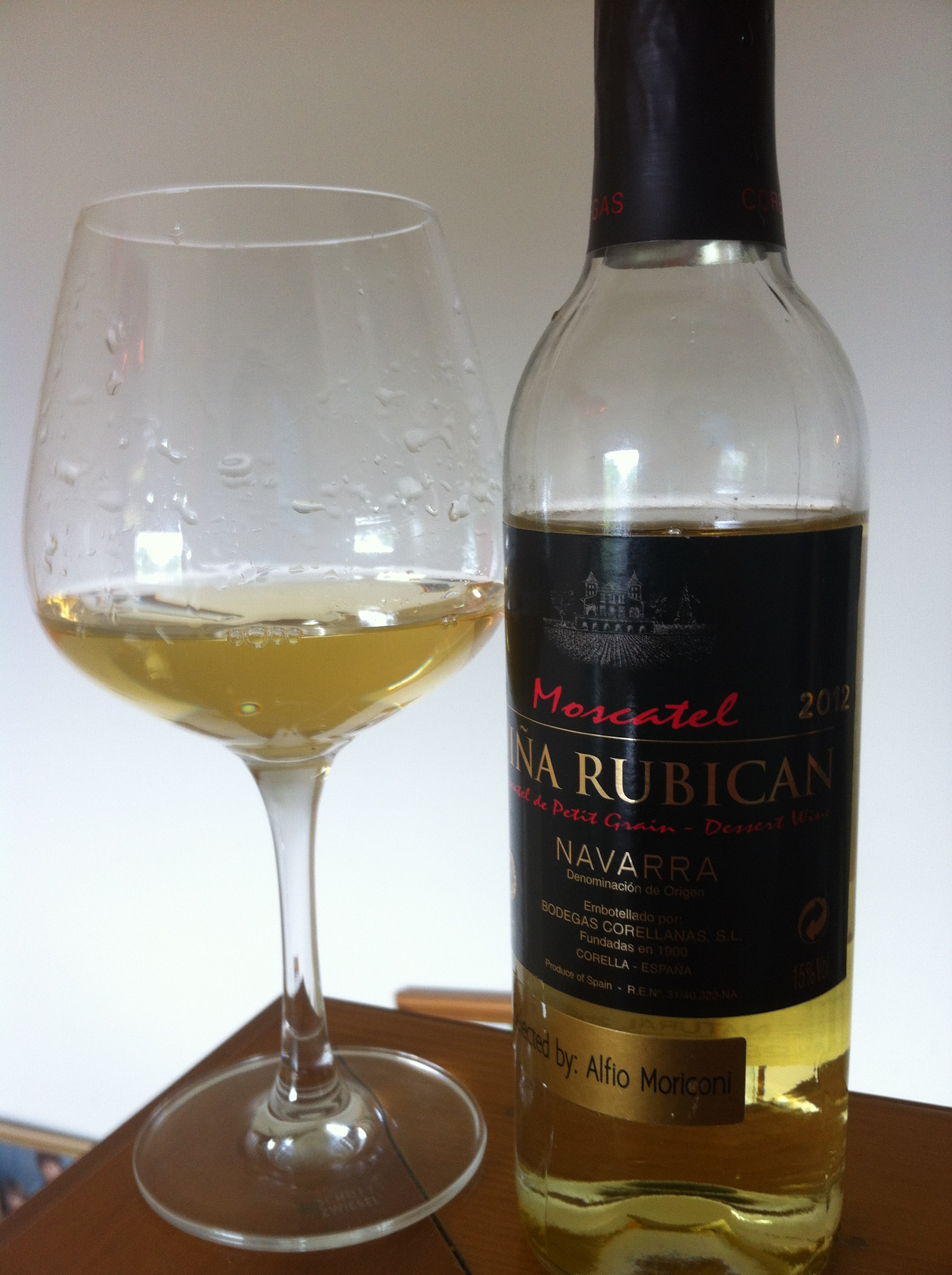
Fortified wine from Navarra DOP, made from the Moscatel de Grano Menudo (Muscat Blanc a Petits Grains) grape

The DOP is divided into 5 sub-zones, each one of which has a distinct identity and produces characteristic wines.

=== Valdizarbe ===
Valdizarbe, the northernmost sub-zone on the upper reaches of the Arga River is a strategic location on the Way of St. James as several paths crossing Navarre converge there. The vineyards cover 25 different municipalities.

=== Tierra Estella ===
To the west of Valdizarbe, Tierra Estella covers 38 different municipalities and extends along the Way of St. James in Western Navarre, on the middle reaches of the Ega River.

=== Ribera Alta ===
The Ribera Alta sub-zone is centred on the town of Olite on the left bank of the river Ebro, above the lower reaches of the rivers Arga, Ega and Aragón, and covers 26 municipalities.

=== Baja Montaña ===
This sub-zone covers 22 municipalities and is located in the northeast of the DOP, on the middle reaches of the river Aragón.

=== Ribera Baja ===
The Ribera Baja sub-zone is in the south of Navarre and is the most important of the five in terms of area and number of wineries. It covers 14 different municipalities, all on a dry, sandy plain on the right bank of the river Ebro.

== Climate ==
The climate in Navarra is continental (long, hot, dry summers and cold winters). The northern sub-zones have a dry continental climate with Atlantic influences and with only moderate heat during the period when the grapes are ripening, as the nights start to get cooler during the month of August.

Average rainfall in the DOP is 625 mm per year. In the areas at higher altitudes, there is the occasional risk of frost and of violent storms.

== Authorised Grape Varieties ==
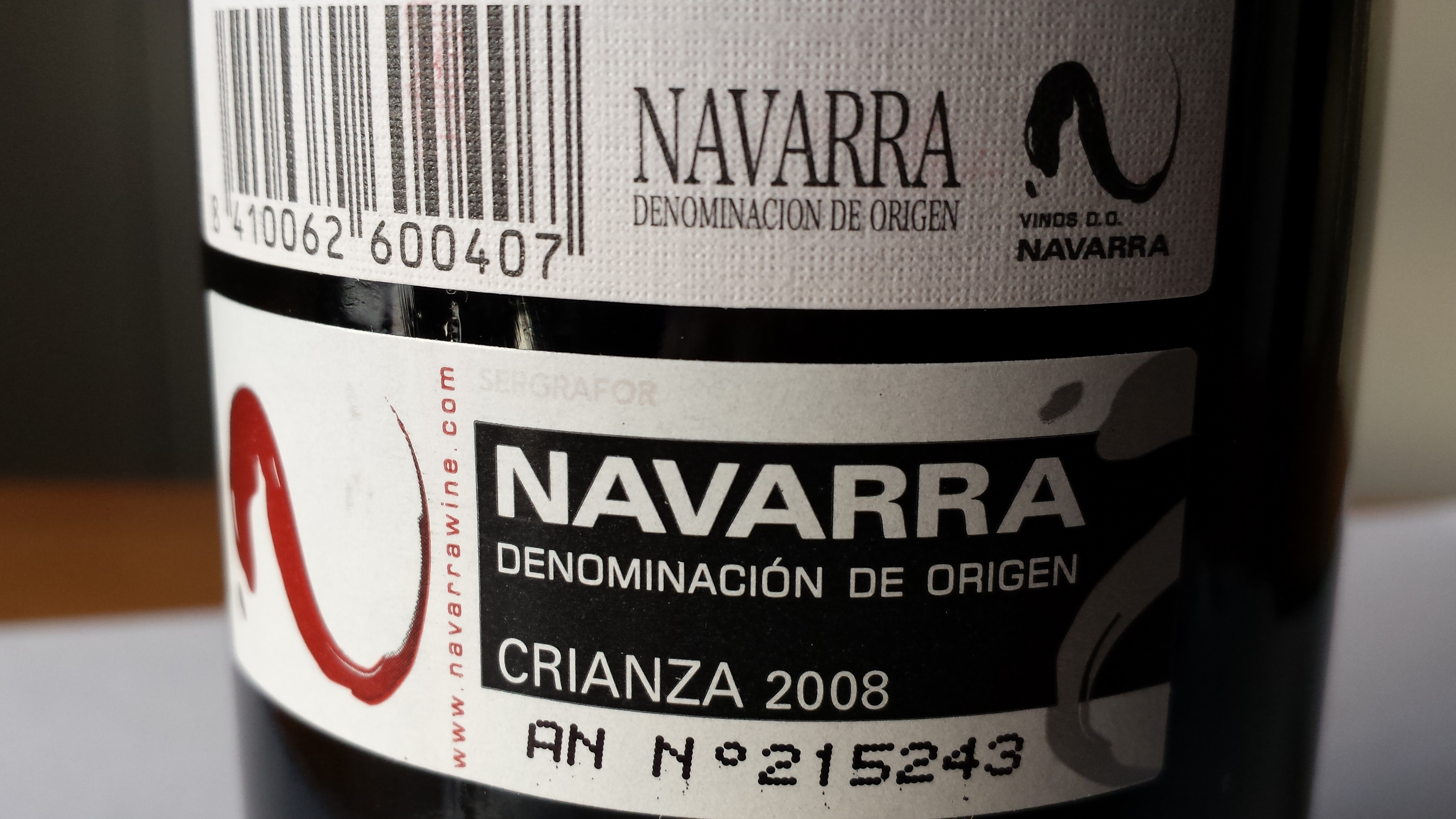
Official DOP label as found on the back of a Navarra region wine bottle

The authorised grape varieties are:

- Red: Cabernet Sauvignon, Garnacha Tinta, Graciano, Mazuelo, Merlot, Tempranillo, Syrah, and Pinot Noir
- White: Chardonnay, Garnatxa Blanca, Malvasía, Moscatel de Grano Menudo, Viura / Macabeo, and Sauvignon Blanc

Most vines are trained along trellises (en espaldera) to maximize exposure to the sunlight and to facilitate mechanization, as opposed to being planted as low bushes (en vaso). Planting density is over 2,400 vines/ha. Yield in all five sub-zones is below the authorized maximum of 8,000 kh/ha, and vary between 6,200 kg/ha in Valdizarbe and 7,800 kg/ha in the south.
