= La Mancha (DO) =

Spanish DOP for wines

Coordinates: 39°24′20″N 3°12′20″W

La Mancha DOP
- Wine region
- La Mancha DOP in the provinces of Albacete, Ciudad Real, Cuenca and Toledo in the region of Castile-La Mancha
- Official name: D.O.P. La Mancha
- Type: Denominación de Origen Protegida (DOP)
- Year established: 1932
- Country: Spain
- Size of planted vineyards: 165,470 hectares (408,885 acres)
- No. of wineries: 247
- Wine produced: 642,076 hectolitres
- Comments: Data for 2016 / 2017

La Mancha DO in Castile-La Mancha

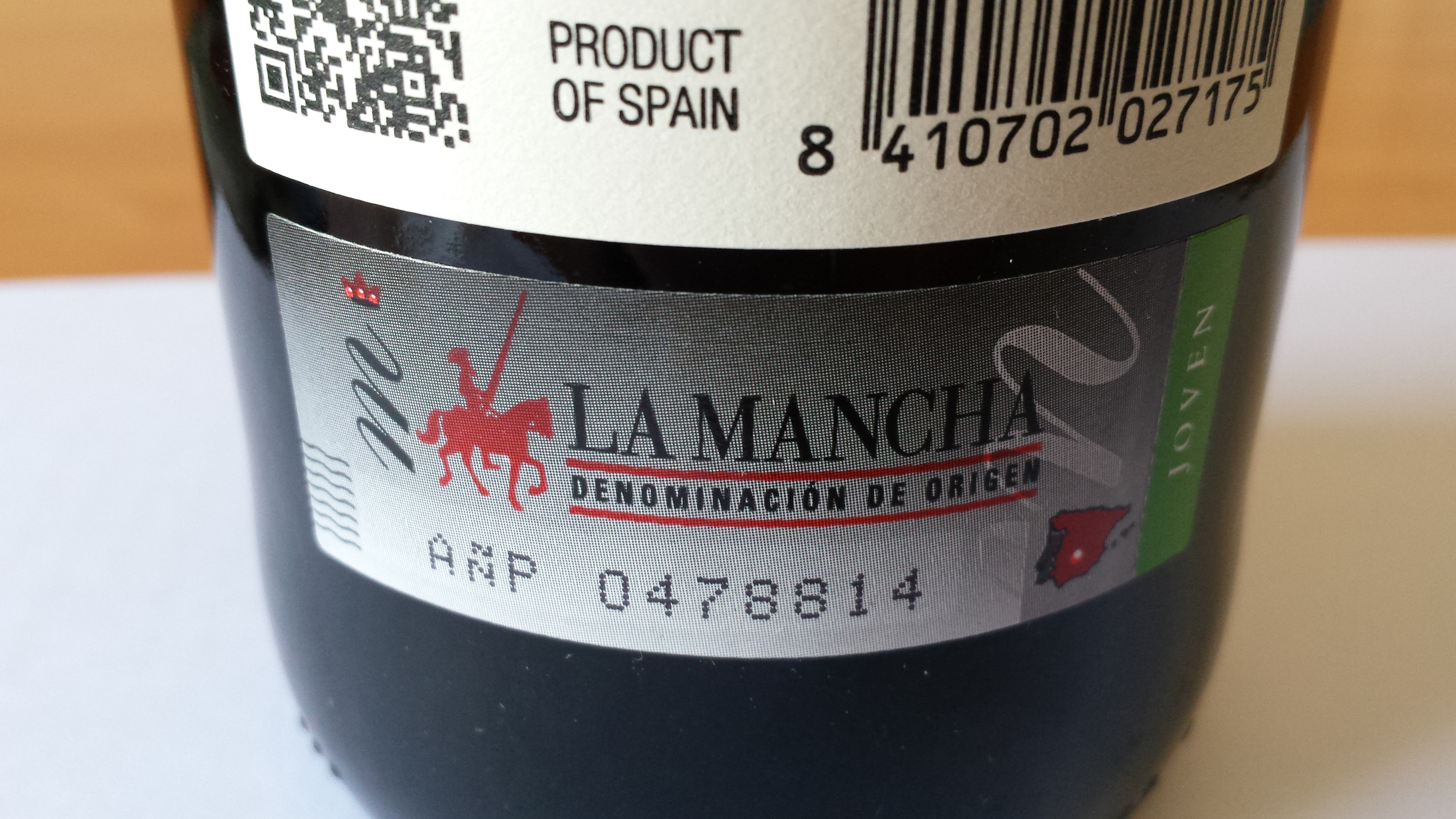
Official DO label as found on the back of a La Mancha region wine bottle

La Mancha is a Spanish Denominación de Origen Protegida (DOP) for wines, with over 190,000 ha planted to vines, and is the largest continuous vine-growing area in the world. It is located in the autonomous community of Castile-La Mancha in central Spain and includes 182 municipalities: 12 in the province of Albacete, 58 in Ciudad Real, 66 in Cuenca and 46 in Toledo.

== History ==
The first written documentation on viticulture in the region dates from the 12th century, though it is generally believed that vines were introduced by the ancient Romans as in other regions of the Iberian Peninsula. Wine production took off in the 1940s due to the setting up of numerous cooperatives in the region.

Viticulture is the economic mainstay of many of the municipalities that form part of the DOP.

== Climate ==
The climate is continental (long, hot summers and cold winters) and ranges from extremes of -15 °C in winter to 45 °C in summer. Drought is also common due to the micro-climate of La Mancha, which prevents moisture-bearing winds from crossing it; mean annual rainfall is about 300 to 400 mm. On the other hand, the vines are exposed to about 3,000 hours of sunlight per year.

== Soil ==
The soil structure is very homogeneous throughout the region and tends to be flat. It is formed of reddish-brown sandy clay, which is poor in organic material and rich in lime and chalk. Strata of lime are common and are often broken to allow the roots of the vines to pass through. The land rises constantly from north to south, from 480 m above sea level in Aranjuez in the north to 700 m above sea level in La Mancha in the south.

== Authorised grape varieties ==
The following are the authorised grape varieties:

- Red: Cencibel, Pinot Noir, Graciano, Malbec, Garnacha Tinta, Moravía Dulce / Crujidera, Cabernet Sauvignon, Merlot, Mencía, Monastrell, Petit Verdot, Bobal, and Syrah
- White: Airén, Moscatel de Grano Menudo, Macabeo / Viura, Chardonnay, Sauvignon blanc, Parellada, Pedro Ximénez, Riesling, Torrontés, Verdejo, Viognier, and Gewürztraminer.

== Wines ==
The following eight categories are authorised for La Mancha DOP wines:

- Young Wines. Must be consumed in a period not exceeding nine months after their preparation.
- Traditional Wines. Wines of the last vintage or previous, made in the traditional system of the DO. This section would also include naturally sweet white wines.
- Wines aged in oak barrels. Wines with a production equal to that of young wines or traditional, but with a minimum time in oak barrels for 60 days.
- Crianza wines. With two years of natural aging, of which one must be in barrel and bottle.
- Reserva wines. With a minimum of twelve months aging in oak and twenty-four months in bottle.
- Gran Reserva wines. With a minimum of twenty four months aging in oak and thirty-six months in bottle.
- Semi-sparkling. Wines that by their particular development retain a small amount of carbon dioxide from the fermentation of sugars.
- Sparkling/Espumosos. White or rosé. Wines made with the traditional champenoise method.
