= Spanish wine =

Wine making in Spain

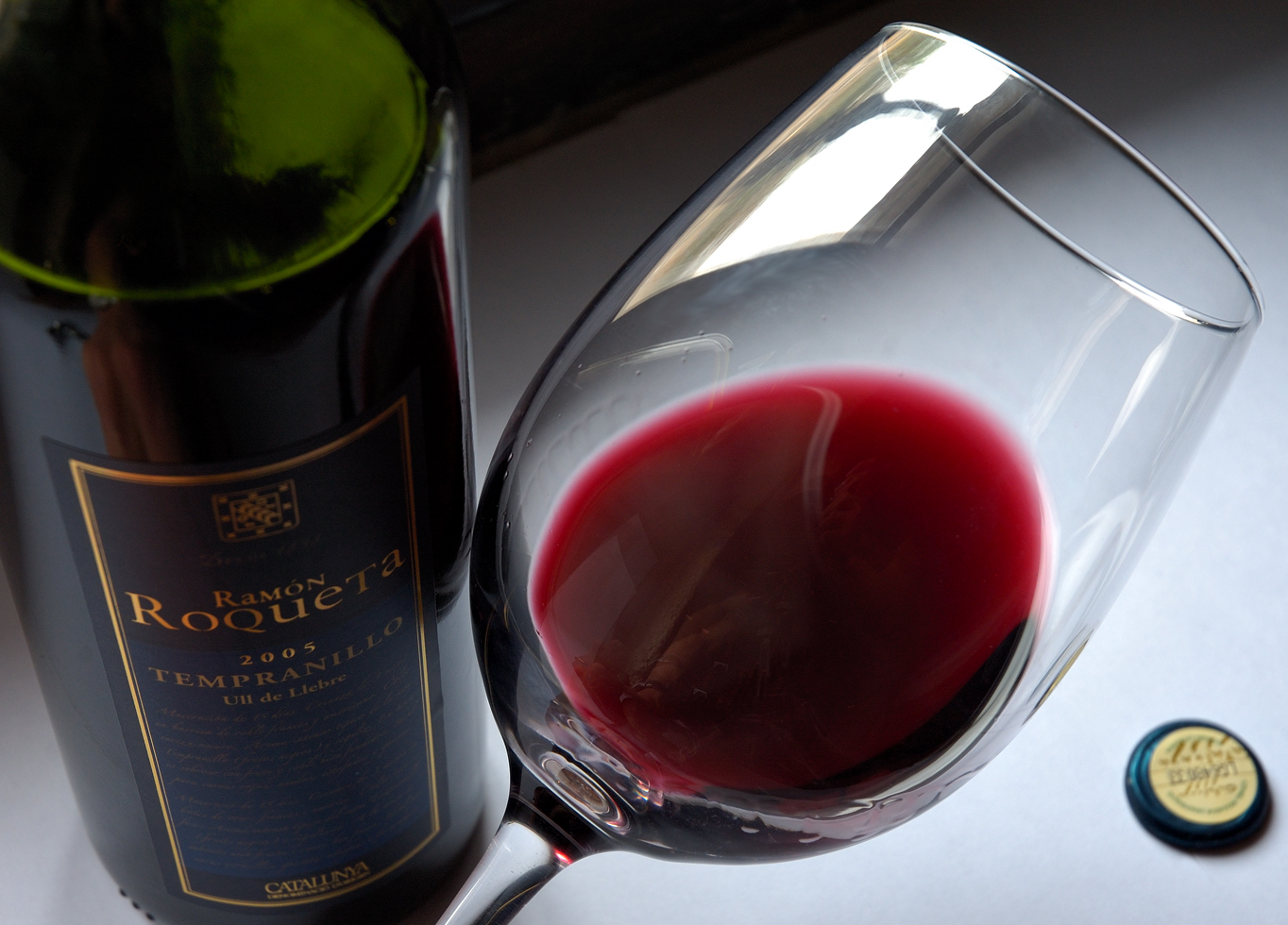
A glass and bottle of Spanish Tempranillo wine, from Bodegues Ramon Roqueta, Catalunya DOP

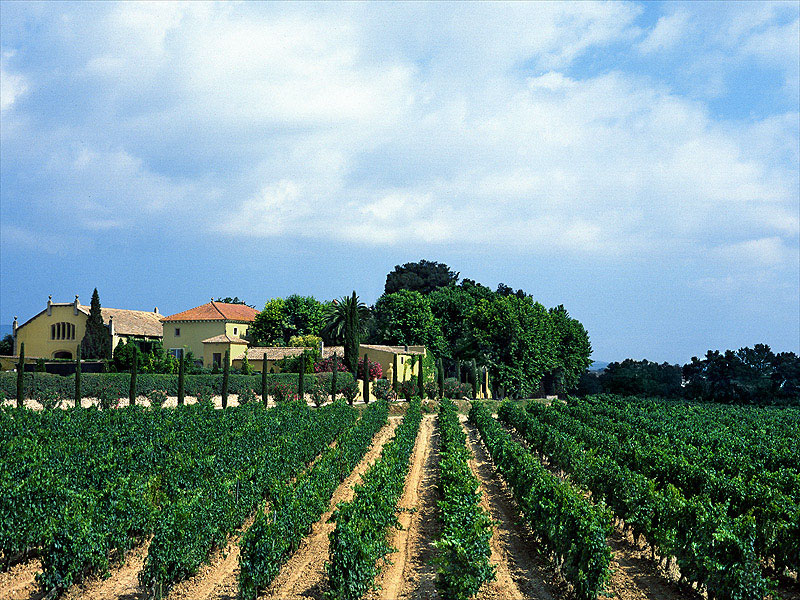
Traditional vineyards are common sights in the countryside.

Spanish wine (Spanish: vino español or vino de España) includes red, white, and sparkling wines produced throughout the country. Located on the Iberian Peninsula, Spain has over 1.2 million hectares (3.0 million acres) planted in wine grapes, making it the most widely planted wine-producing nation, but the third largest producer of wine in the world, behind Italy and France and ahead of the United States; this is due, in part, to the very low yields and wide spacing of the old vines planted on the dry soils found in some of the Spanish wine regions. The country is second in wine exports and ninth in worldwide consumption, with Spaniards drinking, on average, 21.6 litres (5.7 US gal) per person a year. The country has an abundance of native grape varieties, with over 400 varieties planted throughout Spain, though 88 percent of the country's wine production is from only 20 grapes — including the reds Tempranillo, Bobal, Garnacha, and Monastrell; the whites Albariño, Airén, Verdejo, Palomino, and Macabeo; and the three Cava grapes Parellada, Xarel·lo, and Macabeo.

Major Spanish wine regions include the Rioja and Ribera del Duero, which are known for their Tempranillo production; Jumilla, known for its Monastrell production; Jerez de la Frontera, the home of the fortified wine Sherry; Rías Baixas in the northwest region of Galicia that is known for its white wines made from Albariño and Catalonia which includes the Cava and still wine-producing regions of the Penedès as well the Priorat region.

== History ==
The abundance of native grape varieties fostered an early start to viticulture with evidence of grape pips dating back to the Tertiary period. Archaeologists believe that these grapes were first cultivated sometime between 4000 and 3000 BC, long before the wine-growing culture of the Phoenicians founded the trading post of Cádiz around 1100 BC. Following the Phoenicians, the Carthaginians introduced new advances to the region-including the teachings of the early viticulturist Mago. Carthage would wage a series of wars with the emerging Roman Republic that would lead to the Roman conquest of the Spanish mainland, known as Hispania.

=== From Roman rule to the Reconquista ===
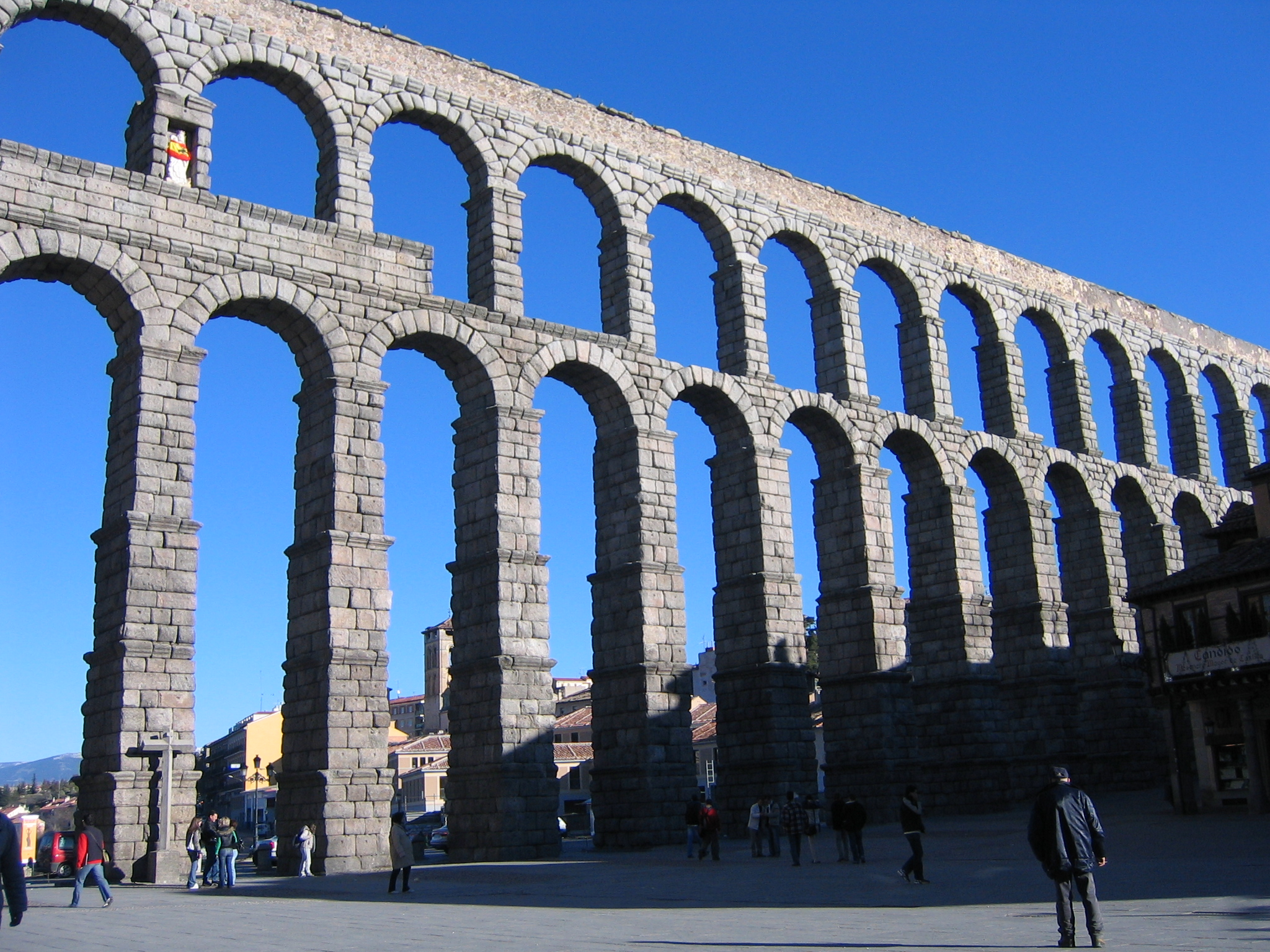
Roman aqueduct built in the Castile and León city of Segovia

Under Roman rule, Spanish wine was widely exported and traded throughout the Roman empire. The two largest wine-producing regions at the time were Terraconensis (modern-day Tarragona) in the north and Baetica (modern-day Andalucia) in the south. During this period more Spanish wine was exported into Gaul than Italian wine, with amphorae being found in ruins of Roman settlements in Normandy, the Loire Valley, Brittany, Provence and Bordeaux. Spanish wine was also provided to Roman soldiers guarding border settlements in Britain and the Limes Germanicus in Germania. The quality of Spanish wine during Roman times was varied, with Pliny the Elder and Martial noting the high quality associated with some wines from Terraconensis while Ovid notes that one popular Spanish wine sold in Rome, known as Saguntum, was merely good for getting your mistress drunk. (Ars amatoria 3.645-6).

Following the decline of the Roman Empire, Spain was invaded by various barbaric tribes-including the Suebi and the Visigoths. Little is known about the progress of viticulture and winemaking during this period but there is evidence that some viable form of the wine industry was present when the Moors conquered the land during the early 8th century AD. While the Moors were Muslim and subjected to Islamic dietary laws that forbid the use of alcohol, the Moorish rulers held an ambiguous stance on wine and winemaking during their rule. Several caliphs and emirs owned vineyards and drank wine. While there were laws written that outlawed the sale of wine, it was included on lists of items that were subject to taxation in Moorish territories. The Spanish Reconquista reopened the possibility of exporting Spanish wine. Bilbao emerged as a large trading port; introducing Spanish wines to the English wine markets in Bristol, London and Southampton. The quality of some of these exported Spanish wines appears to have been high. In 1364, the court of Edward III established the maximum price of wine sold in England with the Spanish wines being priced at the same level as wines from Gascony and higher than those from La Rochelle. The full-bodied and high alcohol in most Spanish wines made them favoured blending partners for the "weaker" wines from the cooler climate regions of France and Germany though there were laws that explicitly outlawed this practice.

=== Colonization of the New World ===
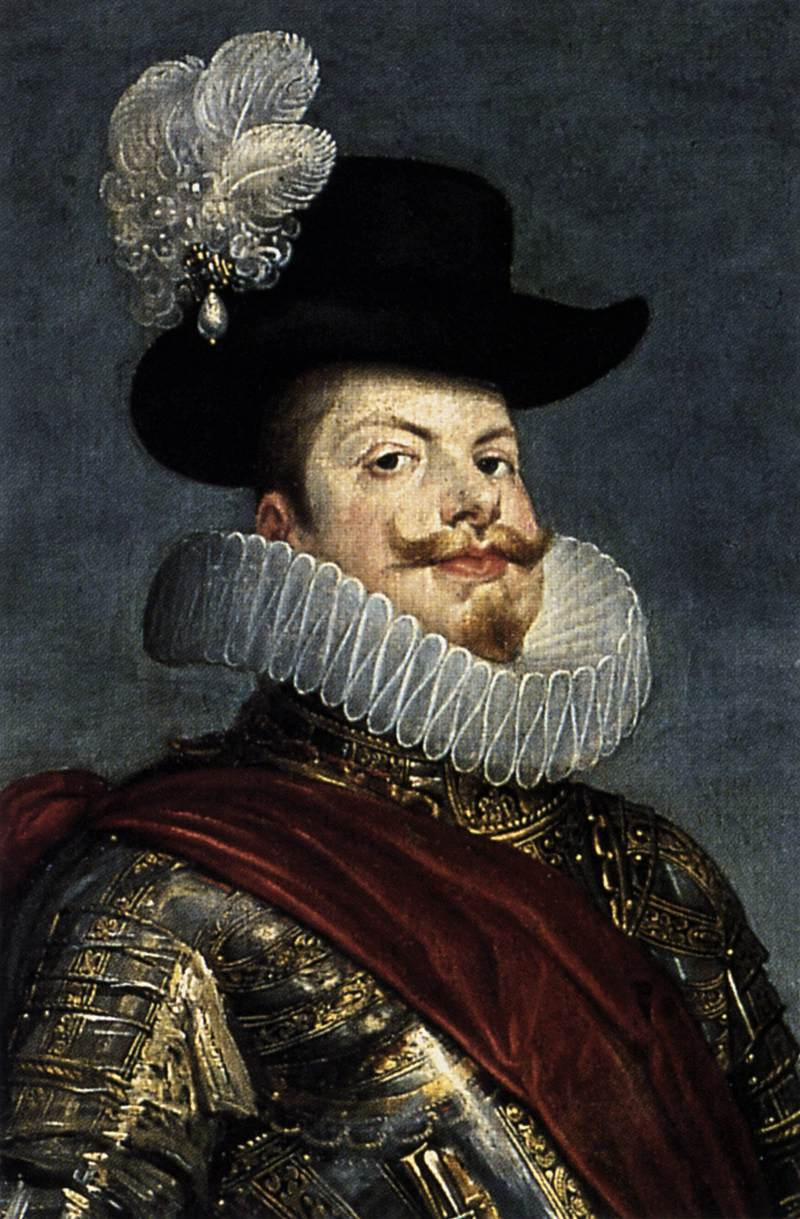
Under the reign of Phillip III, Spain became more dependent on income from exporting wines to South America.

Following the completion of the Spanish Reconquista in 1492, Christopher Columbus discovered the New World under the sponsorship of the Spanish crown. This opened up a new export market as well as a new opportunity for wine production. Spanish missionaries and conquistadors brought European grape vines with them as they colonized the new lands. During this period Spanish exports to England began to wane as Spanish-English relations steadily deteriorated following the divorce of Henry VIII of England from his Spanish wife Catherine of Aragon. English merchants from the Sherry producing regions of Jerez and Sanlúcar de Barrameda as well as Málaga fled the area due to the fear of persecution by the Spanish Inquisition.

The defeat of the Spanish Armada in the Anglo-Spanish War greatly reduced the strength of the Spanish navy and contributed to the country's debt incurred during the reign of Philip II. Spain became more dependent on the income from its Spanish colonies, including the exportation of Spanish wine to the Americas. The emergence of growing wine industries in Mexico, Peru, Chile and Argentina was a threat to this income, with Philip III and succeeding monarchs issuing decrees and declarations ordering the uprooting of New World vineyards and halting the production of wine by the colonies. In some countries, like Chile, these orders were largely ignored; but in others, like Argentina, they served to stunt growth and development until independence was gained from Spanish rule.

=== From phylloxera to modern day ===
The 17th and 18th centuries saw periods of popularity for various Spanish wines, namely Sherry (known in Britain as "sack"), Malaga and Rioja. However, the Spanish wine industry was falling behind those of other European countries who were embracing the developments of the early Industrial Age. A major turning point occurred in the mid-19th century when the phylloxera epidemic ravaged European vineyards – most notably those of France. With the sudden shortage of French wine, many countries turned to Spain, with French winemakers crossing the Pyrenees to Rioja, Navarre and Catalonia, bringing with them their expertise and winemaking methods. One of these developments was the introduction of the 59 U.S. gallons (220 liters) oak barrica. Phylloxera eventually reached Spain, devastating regions like Malaga in 1878 and reaching Rioja in 1901. Its slow progress was due in part to the wide tracts of land, including the Meseta Central, that separated the major Spanish wine regions from each other. By the time the Spanish wine industry felt the full force of phylloxera, the remedy of grafting American rootstock to the European vines had already been discovered and widely utilized.

The end of the 19th century also saw the emergence of Spain's sparkling wine industry with the development of Cava in Catalonia. As the 20th century progressed, the production of Cava would rival the Champagne region in worldwide production. Civil and political upheaval would mark most of the 20th century, including a military dictatorship under General Miguel Primo de Rivera. One of the measures instituted by Primo de Rivera was the early groundwork of the Denominación de Origen (DO) appellation system first developed in Rioja in 1926. The Spanish Civil War saw vineyards neglected and wineries destroyed throughout Spain with regions like Catalonia and Valencia being particularly hard hit. The Second World War closed off European markets to Spanish exports and further damaged the Spanish economy.

It wasn't till the 1950s that domestic stability helped to usher in a period of revival for the Spanish wine industry. Several large co-operative wineries were founded during this period and an international market was created for generic bulk wines that were sold under names like Spanish sauternes and Spanish chablis. In the 1960s, Sherry was rediscovered by the international wine market and soon Rioja wine was in demand. The death of Francisco Franco in 1975 and the Spanish transition to democracy allowed more economic freedom for winemakers and created an emerging market with the growing middle class of Spain. The late 1970s and 1980s saw periods of modernization and a renewed emphasis on quality wine production. The 1986 acceptance of Spain into the European Union brought economic aid to the rural wine industries of Galicia and La Mancha. The 1990s saw the influence of flying winemakers from abroad and broader acceptance of the use of international grape varieties like Cabernet Sauvignon and Chardonnay. In 1996, the restrictions on irrigation were lifted which gave winemakers greater control over yields and what areas could be planted. Soon the quality and production volume of premium wines began to overtake the presence of generic Spanish bulk wines on the market and Spain's reputation entering the 21st century was that of a serious wine-producing country that could compete with other producers in the world wine market.

== Geography and climate ==
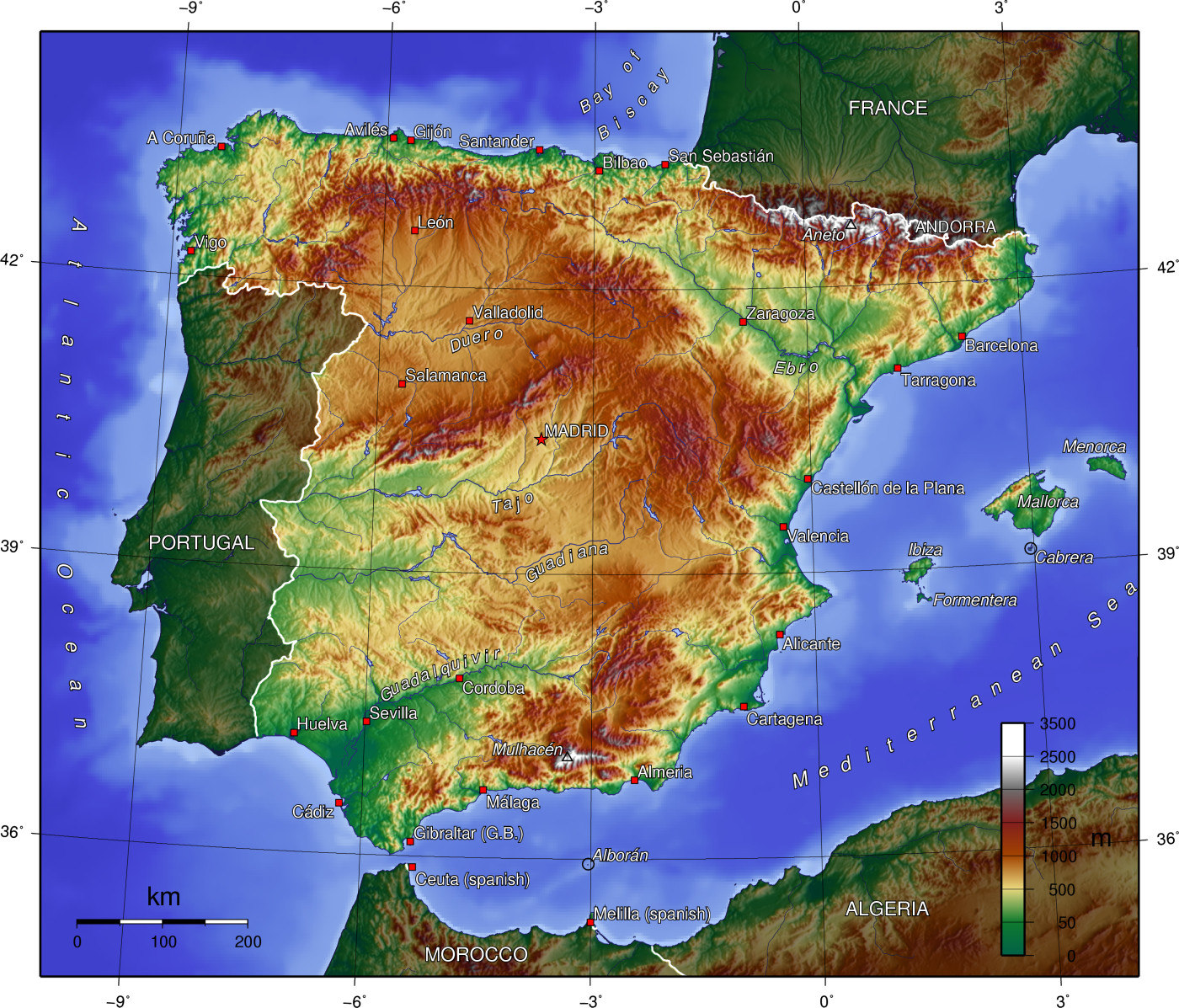
The mountain ranges of Spain influence the climates of many Spanish wine regions, isolating regions like Galicia in the northwest and protecting the Rioja region from the rain and cool winds from the Bay of Biscay.

One of the dominant geographical influences of Spanish viticulture is the vast plateau known as the Meseta Central that covers much of central Spain. Several of Spain's principal rivers that are at the heart of many Spanish wine regions flow to the sea from that central area. These include the eastward flowing Ebro river that runs through the Rioja and several Catalan wine regions; the Duero which flows westward through the Ribera del Duero region in Spain before crossing the border into Portugal's Douro Valley which is at the heart of Port wine production; the Tajo which runs through the La Mancha region; Guadalquivir which flows into the Atlantic at the Sherry producing village of Sanlúcar de Barrameda. In addition to the Meseta Central, several mountain ranges are known as cordilleras serve to isolate and influence the climate of several Spanish wine regions. These include the Cantabrian Mountains that spur westward from the Pyrenees and protect regions like the Rioja from the rain and the cool of westerlies coming from the Bay of Biscay. The Cantabrian Mountains act as a rain shadow with the coastal regions of the Basque Country receiving an average of 59 inches (1,500 mm) while the winemaking region of Rioja, near Haro, around 62 miles (100 km) away receives only 18 inches (460 mm). In Galicia on the northwest coast, the region receives annual rainfall that ranges from 39 inches (990 mm) on the coast to 79 inches (2.0 m) near the mountainous border of Castile and León.

The climate gets more extreme further inland towards the Meseta Central and is characterized by hot summers with temperatures that can reach 104 °F (40 °C) with drought conditions. Many regions receive less than 12 inches (300 mm) of rain annually with most of the rain falling during sudden downpours in the spring and autumn that can pose the risk of flash flooding. Winters in these regions are characterized by cold temperatures that can often fall below freezing around −8 °F (−22 °C). Towards the southeast, around Valencia, the climate is more moderate with the strong Mediterranean influence. In the south, the Sherry and Malaga producing regions of Andalusia contain some of the hottest parts of Spain. North of the Sierra Nevada mountains in the Guadalquivir Valley, temperatures often reach 113 °F (45 °C) in the summer. To adapt to these high temperatures, many Spanish vineyards will be planted on higher elevations, with many vineyards located over 2,000 feet (610 m) above sea level. These high altitudes create a large diurnal temperature variation with low night time temperatures that allow the grapes to maintain acidity levels and colouring. Regions with lower altitude vineyards, such as along the southern Mediterranean coast are suitable for producing grapes of high alcohol levels and low acidity.

== Wine regions ==
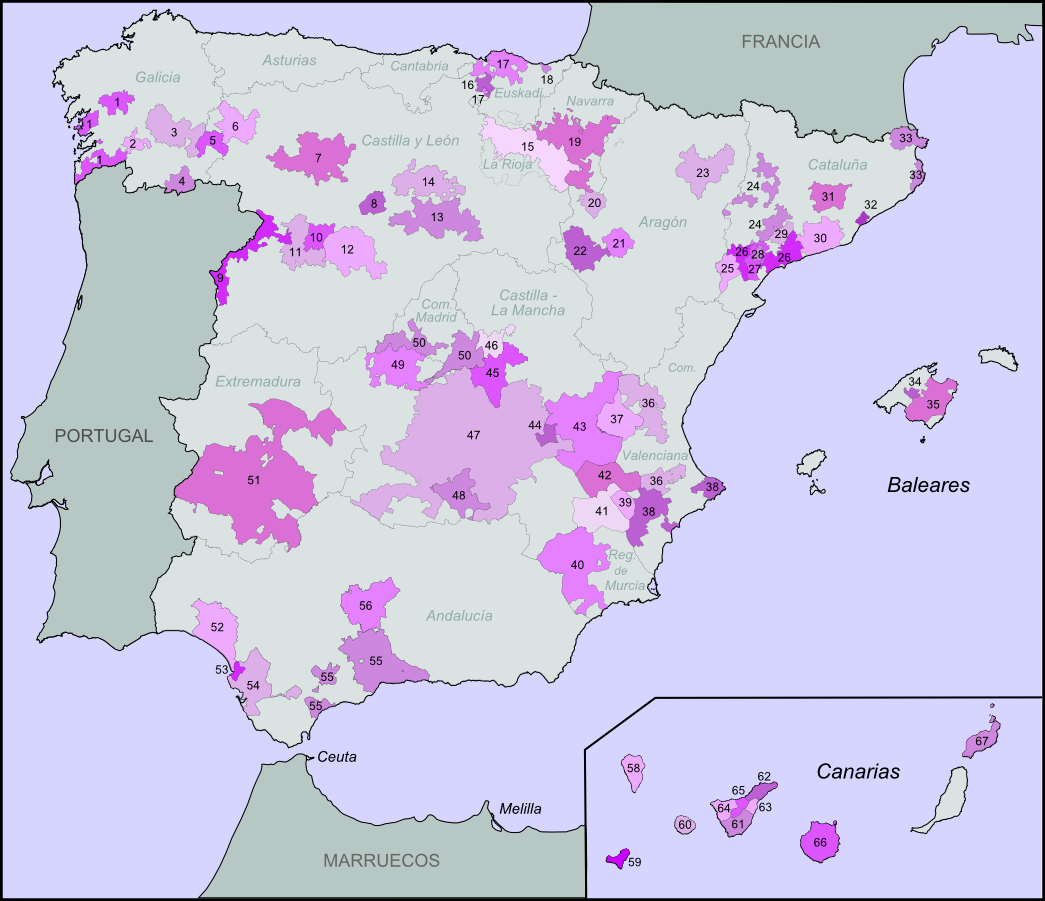
Wine regions of Spain

Spain can be traditionally divided into 12 main wine regions. These wine regions somewhat follow the administrative borders of the 17 Autonomous Communities that make up the modern state of Spain. The central Autonomous Community of Castilla – La Mancha is the largest wine producing region, producing 13 million hl (340 million US gal), a third of Spanish wine output. Catalonia is the second largest producer, producing 5.5 million hl (150 million US gal) (14% of total), and La Rioja is the third largest, producing almost 5 million hl (130 million US gal) (13% of total). These larger wine regions are further divided into smaller wine regions that are classified under the Spanish wine law system, with 138 identifiable wine regions.

== Classification ==
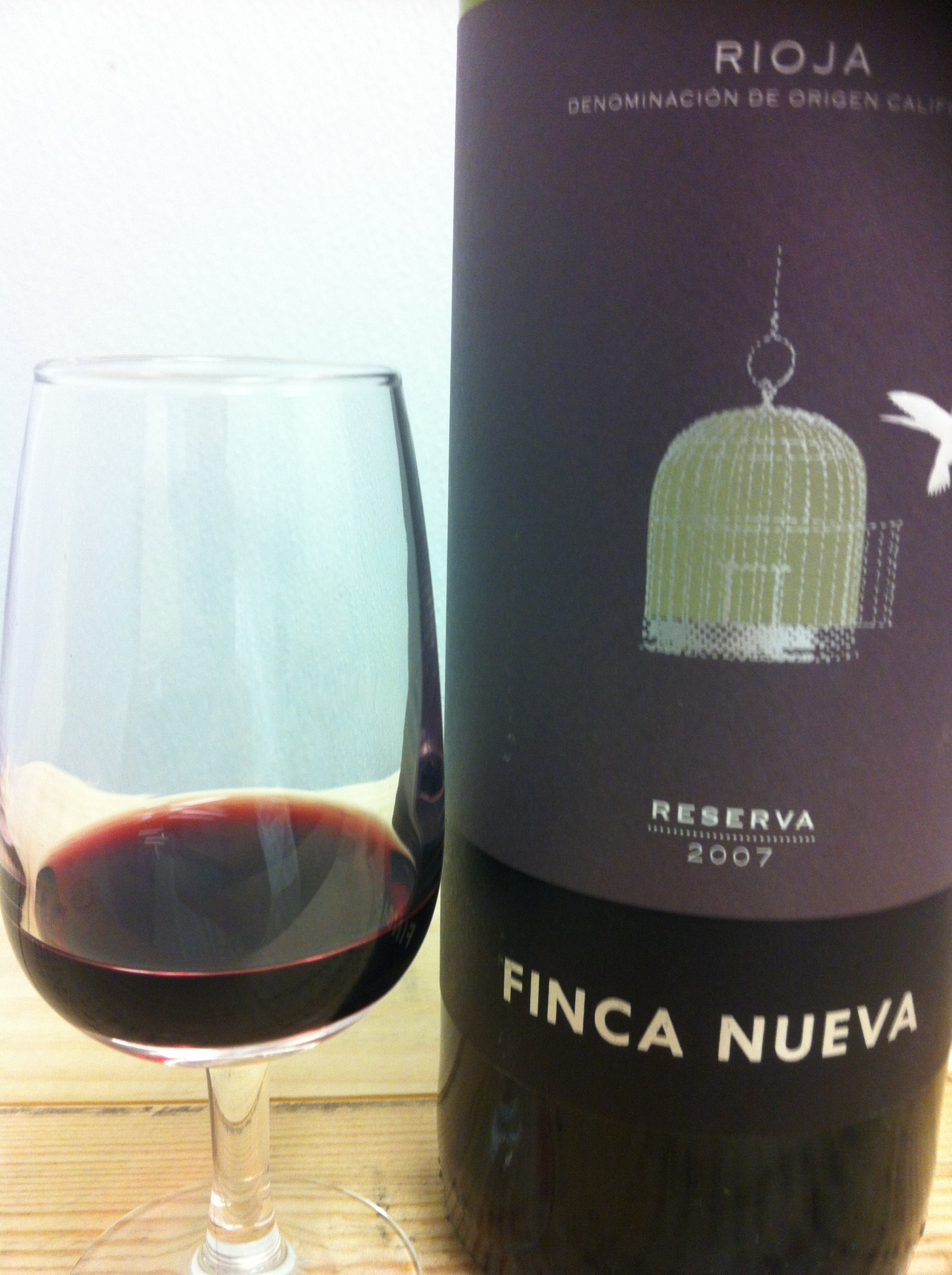
A Reserva level Rioja

Spanish wine laws created the Denominación de Origen (DO) system in 1932 that were later revised in 1970, and recently updated in 2016 to be called DOP denominación de origen protegida ('protected denomination of origin'). The system shares many similarities with the hierarchical Appellation d'origine contrôlée (AOC) system of France, Portugal's Denominação de Origem Controlada (DOC) and Italy's Denominazione di origine controllata (DOC) system. As of 2019, there were 138 DOP and IGP areas across Spain. Within the DOP category, there is the Denominación de Origen Calificada (DOCa or DOQ in Catalan) status for DOPs that have a consistent track record for quality. There are currently two DOCa/DOQ regions: Rioja and Priorat.

Each DOP has a Consejo Regulador, which acts as a governing control body that enforces the DOP regulations and standards involving viticultural and winemaking practices. These regulations govern everything from the types of grapes that are permitted to be planted, the maximum yields that can be harvested, the minimum length of time that the wine must be aged and what type of information is required to appear on the wine label. Wineries that are seeking to have their wine sold under DOP status must submit their wines to the Consejo Regulador laboratory and tasting panel for testing and evaluation. Wines that have been granted DOP status will feature the regional stamp of the Consejo Regulador on the label.

Following Spain's acceptance into the European Union, Spanish wine laws were brought in line to be more consistent with other European systems. One development was a five-tier classification system that is administered by each autonomous region. Non-autonomous areas or wine regions whose boundaries overlap with other autonomous communities (such as Cava, Rioja and Jumilla) are administered by the Instituto Nacional de Denominaciones de Origen (INDO) based in Madrid. With updates in 2016, the five-tier became a six-tier classification and is as follows:

- DOP – denominación de origen protegida ('protected denomination of origin'), is the mainstay of Spain's wine quality control system. Each region is governed by a consejo regulador, which decides on the boundaries of the region, permitted varietals, maximum yields, limits of alcoholic strength and other quality standards or production limitations pertaining to the zone. As of 2019 there are 96 DOPs that are subdivided into DOCa, DO, VP, and VC. The sub-categories can be called DOP, or they can use the traditional terms of DOCa, DO, VP, and VC.
- DOCa/DOQ – denominación de origen calificada / denominació d'origen qualificada in Catalan ('qualified denomination of origin') – This designation, which is similar to Italy's Denominazione di Origine Controllata e Garantita (DOCG) designation, is for regions with a track record of consistent quality and is meant to be a step above DO level. Rioja was the first region afforded this designation in 1991 and was followed by Priorat in 2003. In 2008 Ribera del Duero was approved to receive DOCa classification, but acquiring the status was never pursued and Ribera del Duero remains a DO today.
- DO – denominación de origen / denominació d'origen in Catalan ('denomination of origin') – This level is for the mainstream quality-wine regions which are regulated by the Consejo Regulador who is also responsible for marketing the wines of that DO.
- VP – vino de pago ('estate wine'), a special term for high-quality, single-estate wines (pago is a Spanish term for a vineyard estate) which in some cases also have DO or VdlT appellations. This category was formed in 2003.
- VC – vino de calidad con indicación geográfica ('quality wine with geographic indication'), a category formed in 2003 along with VP. The VC category is used for wines that do not fully meet the stringent standards of the DO category, but are above the standards of the IGP category.
- IGP indicación geográfica protegida ('protected geographic indication') – This is below the DOP level, and is wine originating from a specific place, a region or a country, which has a certain quality, reputation or another characteristic – including production phases – that can be essentially attributed to its geographical origin, at least one of which takes place in the defined geographical area. These can use the traditional term Vino de la Tierra (VT).
- VdM vino de mesa ('table wine') – These are wines that are the equivalent of most country's table wines and are made from unclassified vineyards or grapes that have been declassified through "illegal" blending. Similar to the Italian Super Tuscans from the late 20th century, some Spanish winemakers will intentionally declassify their wines so that they have greater flexibility in blending and winemaking methods.

=== Spanish labeling laws ===
Spanish wines are often labeled according to the amount of aging the wine has received. When the label says vino joven ("young wine") or Sin crianza, technically the wines have not been aged at all, but some will have undergone up to a few months oak wood aging. Depending on the producer, some of these wines will be meant to be consumed very young – often within a year of their release. Others will benefit from some time aging in the bottle. For the vintage year (vendimia or cosecha) to appear on the label, a minimum of 85% of the grapes must be from that year's harvest. The three most common aging designations on Spanish wine labels are Crianza, Reserva and Gran Reserva.

- Crianza for Rioja red wines these are aged for 1 year, with at least 6 months in oak barrels. Crianza whites and rosés must be aged for at least 6 months in oak barrels.
- Reserva red wines are aged for at least 3 years, with at least 1 year in oak barrels. Reserva whites and rosés must be aged for at least 2 years with at least 6 months in oak.
- Gran Reserva wines typically appear in above average vintages with the red wines requiring at least 5 years aging, a minimum of 2 years in oak and a minimum of 3 years in the bottle. Gran Reserva whites and rosés must be aged for at least 4 years with at least 6 months in oak.

Less common aging designations also exist:

- Añejo wine aged for at least 2 years.

== Viticulture ==
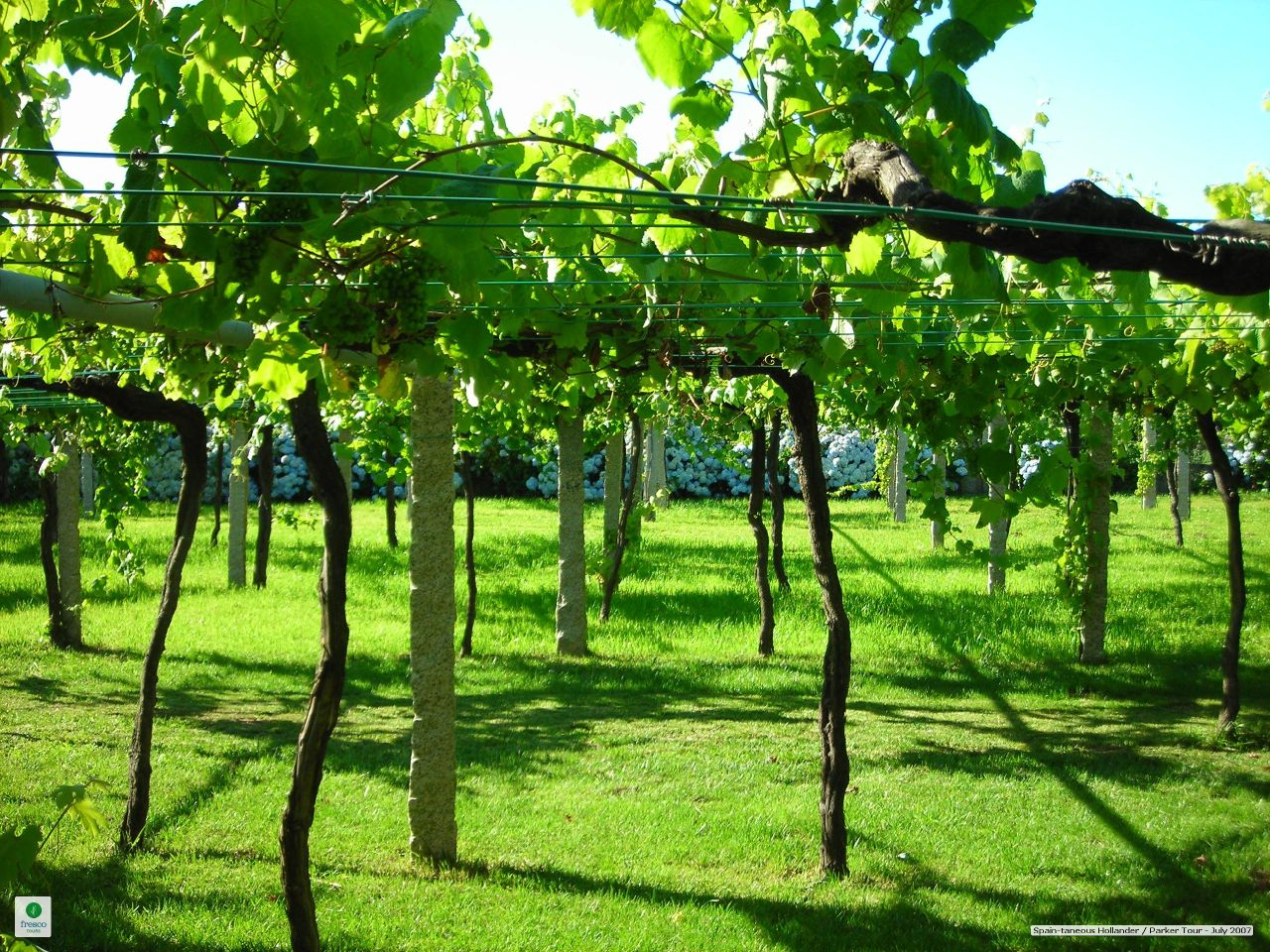
In many Spanish wine regions, such as Galicia, vines are widely spaced in the vineyard.

Viticulture in Spain has developed in adaptation to the varied and extreme climate of the region. The dry weather in many parts of Spain reduces the threat of common viticultural hazards like downy mildew and powdery mildew as well as the development of Botrytis cinerea. In these parts, the threat of drought and the poor fertility of the land has encouraged Spanish vineyard owners to plant their vines with widely spaced rows so that there is less competition between vines for resources. One widely adopted system is known as marco real and involves having 2.5 metres (8 ft) of space between vines in all directions. These areas, mostly in the south and central regions, have some of the lowest vine density in the world—often ranging between 375 and 650 vines per acre (900–1600 vines per hectare). This is less than 1/8 of the vine density commonly found in other wine regions such as Bordeaux and Burgundy. Many Spanish vineyards are several decades old, with the old vines producing even lower yields of fruit. In the Jumilla region of Murcia, for example, yields are often less than 1.1 ton per acre (20 hl/ha).

In the 1990s, the use of irrigation became more popular after droughts in 1994, and 1995 severely reduced the harvest in those years. In 1996, the practice of using irrigation in all Spanish wine regions was legalized with many regions quickly adopting the practice. In the province of Toledo, Australian flying winemakers helped to popularize the use of underground drip irrigation to minimize the effects of evaporation. The widespread use of irrigation has encouraged higher density of vine plantings and has contributed to higher yields in some parts of Spain.

While traditionally Spanish vineyards would harvest their grapes by hand, the modernization of the Spanish wine industry has seen increased use of mechanical harvesting. In years past, most harvesting had to be done in the early morning with wineries often refusing grapes after mid-day due to their prolonged exposure to the blistering heat. In recent years, aided in part by the wider spread of the use of mechanical harvesting, more harvests are now being done at the lower temperatures at night.

=== Grape varieties ===
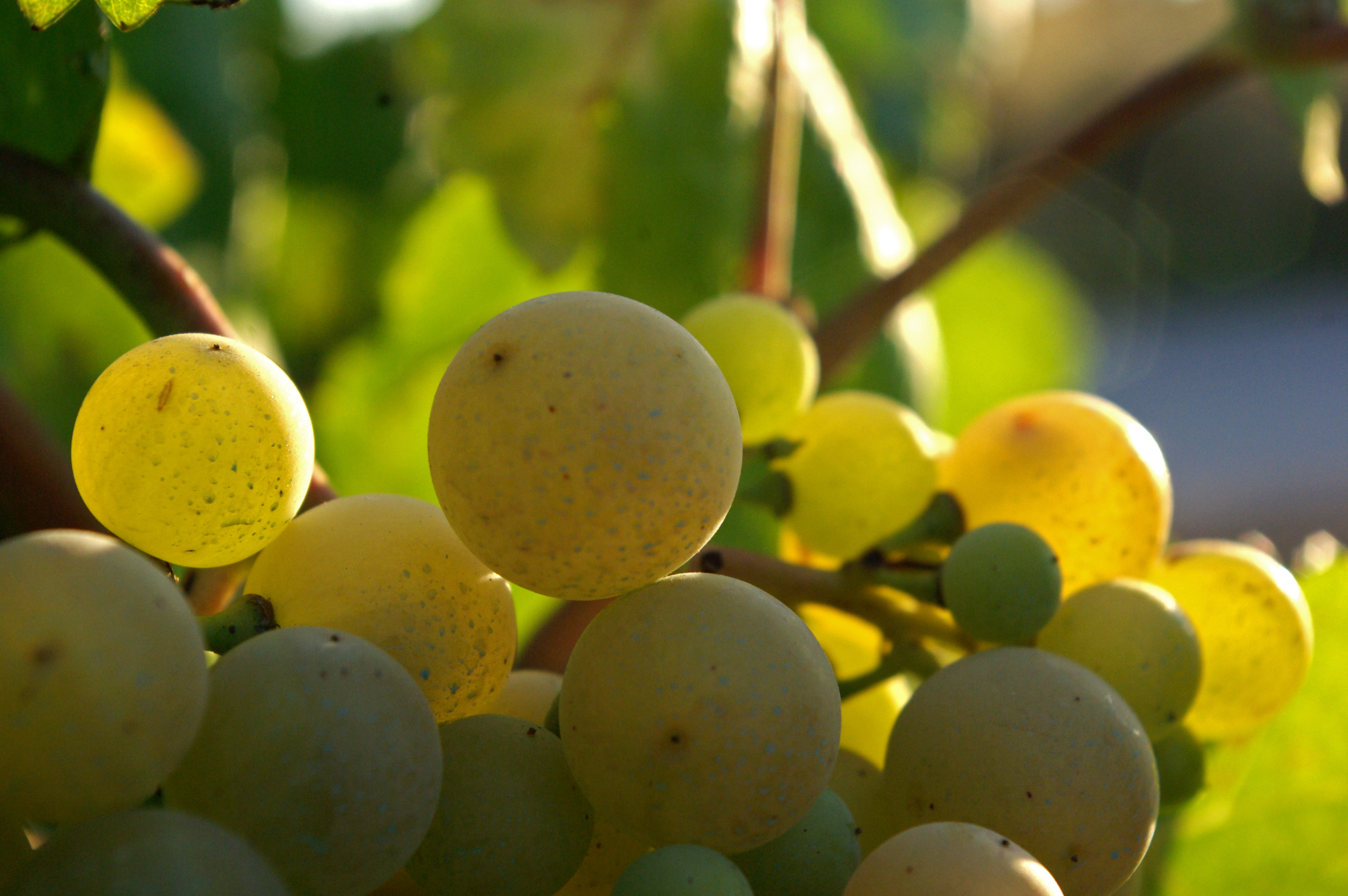
Xarel·lo is one of the principal grapes of the Spanish sparkling wine Cava.

Some records estimate that over 600 grape varieties are planted throughout Spain, but 88% of the country's wine production is focused on only 20 grape varieties. The most widely planted grape is the white wine grape Airén, prized for its hardiness and resistance to drop. It is found throughout central Spain and for many years served as the base for Spanish brandy. Wines made from this grape can be very alcoholic and prone to oxidation. The red wine grape Tempranillo is the second most widely planted grape variety. It is known throughout Spain under a variety of synonyms that may appear on Spanish wine labels including Cencibel, Tinto Fino and Ull de Llebre. Both Tempranillo and Garnacha are used to make the full-bodied red wines associated with the Rioja, Ribera del Duero and Penedès with Garnacha being the main grape of the Priorat region. In the Levante region, Monastrell and Bobal have significant plantings, being used for both dark red wines and dry rosé.

In the northwest, the white wine varieties of Albariño and Verdejo are popular plantings in the Rías Baixas and Rueda respectively. In the Cava producing regions of Catalonia and elsewhere in Spain, the principal grapes of Macabeo, Parellada, and Xarel·lo are used for sparkling wine production as well as still white wines. In the southern Sherry and Malaga producing regions of Andalusia, the principal grapes are Palomino and Pedro Ximénez. As the Spanish wine industry becomes more modern, there has been a larger presence of international grape varieties appearing in both blends and varietal forms, most notably Cabernet Sauvignon, Chardonnay, Syrah, Merlot and Sauvignon blanc. Other Spanish grape varieties that have significant plantings include Cayetana Blanca and Mencía.

== Winemaking ==
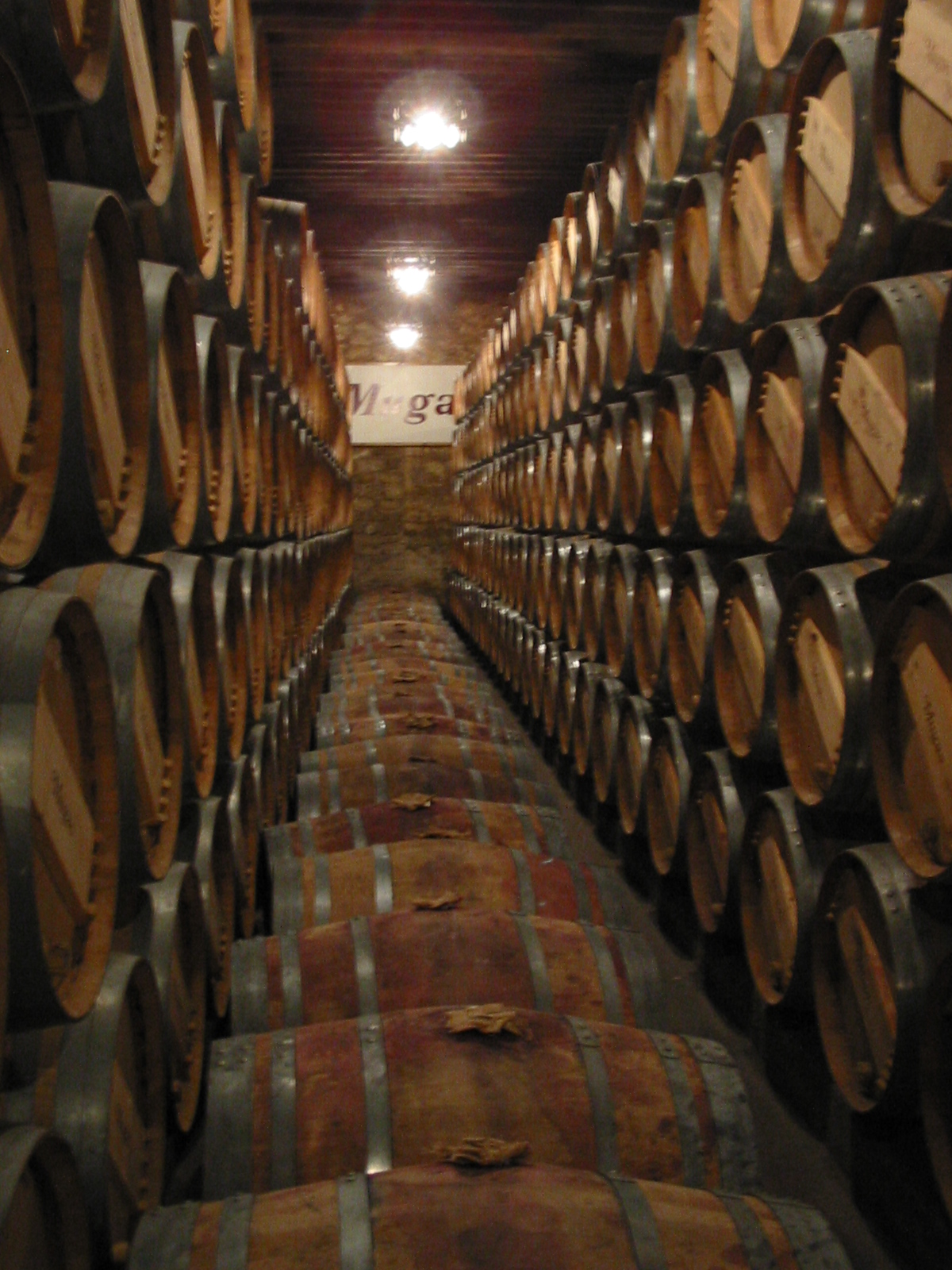
Extended periods of aging in American oak has long been associated with Spanish wine from regions like the Rioja.

In Spain, winemakers often use the Spanish word elaborar (to elaborate) rather than fabricar (to produce/make) when describing the Spanish winemaking philosophy. This relates to the view that the winemaker acts as more of a nurturer of the grapes and wine rather than as a producer. For many years, Spanish winemaking was very rustic and steeped in tradition. This included the judicious use of oak with some wines, even whites, spending as much as two decades ageing in the barrel. This created distinctly identifiable flavors that were internationally associated with the wines from regions such as the Rioja. In the 19th century, wine writers held negative views about Spanish winemaking. Richard Ford noted in 1846 that the Spanish made wine in an "unscientific and careless manner" while Cyrus Redding noted in his work the History and Description of Modern wines that Spanish gave "rude treatment" to the grapes. Some of these criticisms were rooted in the traditional manners of winemaking that were employed in Spain. Crushing and fermentation would take place in earthenware jars known as tinajas. Afterward, the wine was stored in wooden barrels or pig skin bags lined with resin known as cueros. In the warmer climate and regions of lower elevation, the red wines tilted towards being too high in alcohol and too low in acidity. The standard technique to rectify those wines was the addition of white wine grapes which balanced the acidity but diluted some of the fruit flavors of the red grapes.

The advent of temperature control stainless steel fermentation tanks radically changed the wine industry in warm climate regions like Andalucia, La Mancha, and the Levante, allowing winemakers to make fresher and fruitier styles of wine-particularly whites. While many producers focused on these crisp, fresh styles in the early 1990s there was a resurgence in more active use of barrel fermenting whites as a throwback to the traditional, more oxidized styles of the 19th century. The use of oak has a long tradition in Spanish winemaking, dating back even centuries before the French introduced the small 59 U.S. gallons (220 liters) barrica style barrels. Gradually Spanish winemakers in the late 19th and early 20th century started to develop a preference for the cheaper, and more strongly flavored, American oak. Winemakers in regions like the Rioja found that the Tempranillo grape, in particular, responded well to new American oak. In the 1990s, more winemakers started to rediscover the use of French oak and some wineries will use a combination of both as a blend. Most DOs require some minimum period of barrel ageing which will be stipulated on the wine label by the designations-Crianza, Reserva and Gran Reserva depending on how long it spends in the barrel. The tradition of long barrel and bottle ageing has meant that most Spanish wines are ready to drink once they hit the market. A new generation of winemakers have started to produce more vino joven (young wines) that are released with very little ageing.

=== Sherry ===
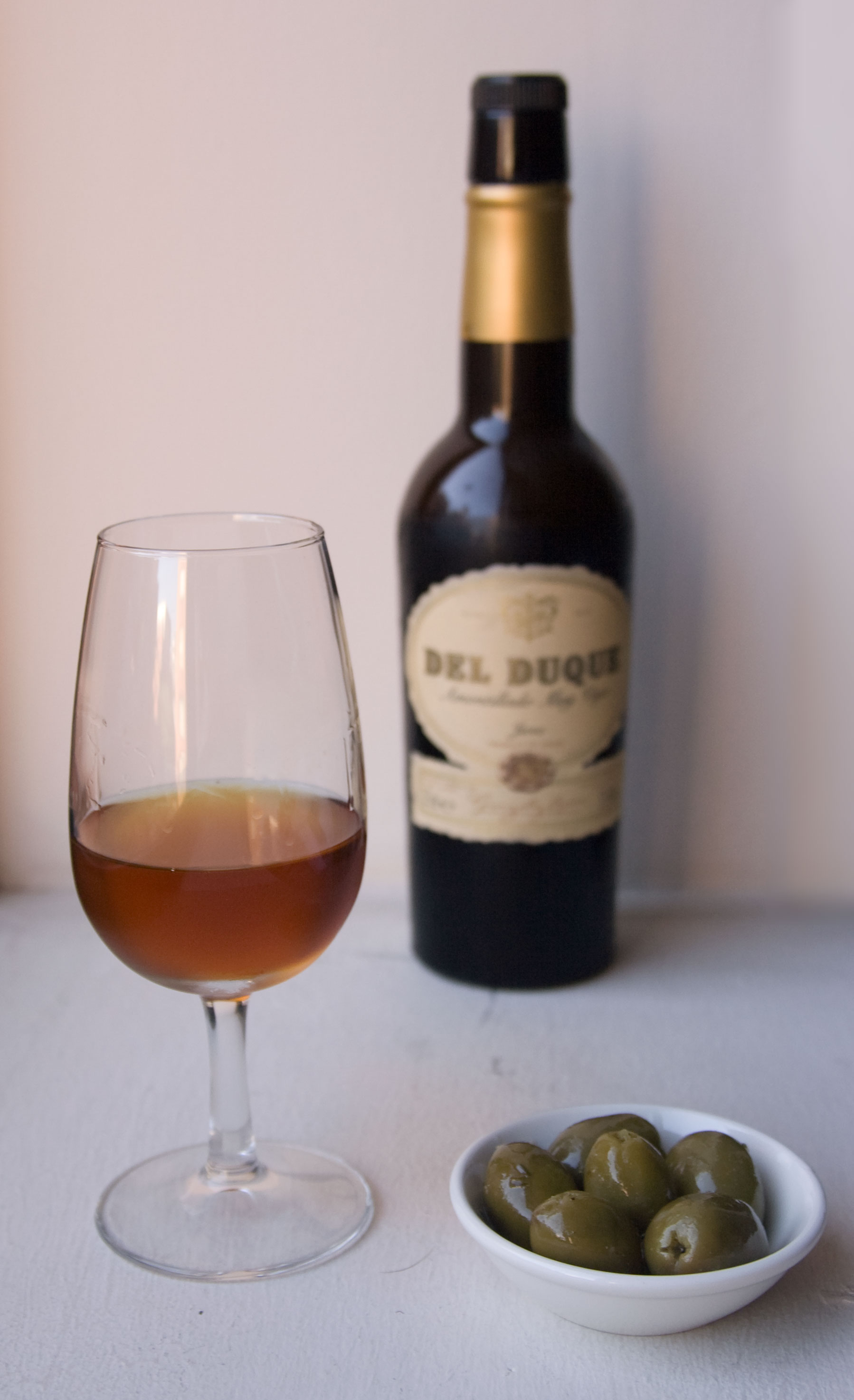
A glass of Amontillado Sherry

Sherry is a heavily fortified wine produced in southern Spain around the towns of Jerez, Sanlúcar de Barrameda, and El Puerto de Santa María. In the 1990s, the European Union restricted the use of the name "Sherry" to the wine made from this region. It is mostly made from the Palomino grape, accounting for nearly 95% of the region's plantings, but Moscatel and Pedro Ximenez can also be used. While the wine is aging in the barrel, a naturally occurring yeast native to the region, known as flor, will develop and distinguish certain styles of Sherry. The flor needs fresh wine in order to survive and is added by the use of a solera system that also gradually blends the wines of different vintages together. Palomino wine, by itself, typically ferments to an alcohol level of around 12% with Sherry producers adding brandy to the wine in order to increase the alcohol level or kill the flor yeast which will not thrive in alcohol levels above 16%.

Sherry has a wide diversity of styles:

- Fino – a very dry and delicate Sherry. These wines are characterized by flor yeast. It has to contain 15 to 17% of alcohol.
- Manzanilla – comes from the town of Sanlúcar de Barrameda by the sea, where flor yeast develops more vigorously. This wine is produced using exactly the same process as Fino, but as weather conditions are very different in Sanlucar district it develops into a slightly different kind of wine, slightly lighter and more saline than Fino. It is entirely dry (less than 1 gram of sugar per litre) and has to contain 15 to 17% of alcohol.
- Amontillado – starts as a Fino, but it loses its layer of flor as it grows older. It is therefore characterized by biological ageing (under flor) but also oxidative ageing (in contact with air). It is full, dry and nutty and by law it has to contain 16 to 22% of alcohol.
- Oloroso – is deeper/darker in color due to oxidative ageing from the start. Like the previous styles it is entirely dry (less than 5 grams of sugar/l). It is full-bodied, complex and round and contains 17 to 22% of alcohol.
- Palo Cortado – is a very rare style. It is made from the finest base wines but like Oloroso it is aged oxidatively. Palo Cortado is said to combine the nose of Amontillado with the depth and body of Oloroso. It contains 17 to 22% of alcohol.
- Moscatel – is a naturally sweet dessert-style wine made from Moscatel grapes with partial fermentation and oxidative ageing. It contains 200–300 grams of sugar per litre and 15 to 22% of alcohol.
- Pedro Ximénez – is very rich and naturally sweet dessert-style wine. It's made from raisins of Pedro Ximénez grapes dried in the sun. It contains 400–500 grams of sugar per litre and 15 to 22% of alcohol.
- Blends of dry and sweet styles of sherry also exist – they were very popular in the 1970s and 1980s but their popularity is now in decline.
  - Pale Cream is a blend of Fino / Manzanilla with Moscatel or grape must, between 45 and 115 grams of sugar and less than 15.5% of alcohol.
  - Medium is a blend of Amontillado or Oloroso with Moscatel or Pedro Ximénez, less than 115 grams of sugar and between 15 and 22% of alcohol.
  - Cream Sherry is usually a blend of Oloroso with Pedro Ximénez, more than 115 grams of sugar and between 15.5% and 22% of alcohol.

=== Cava ===
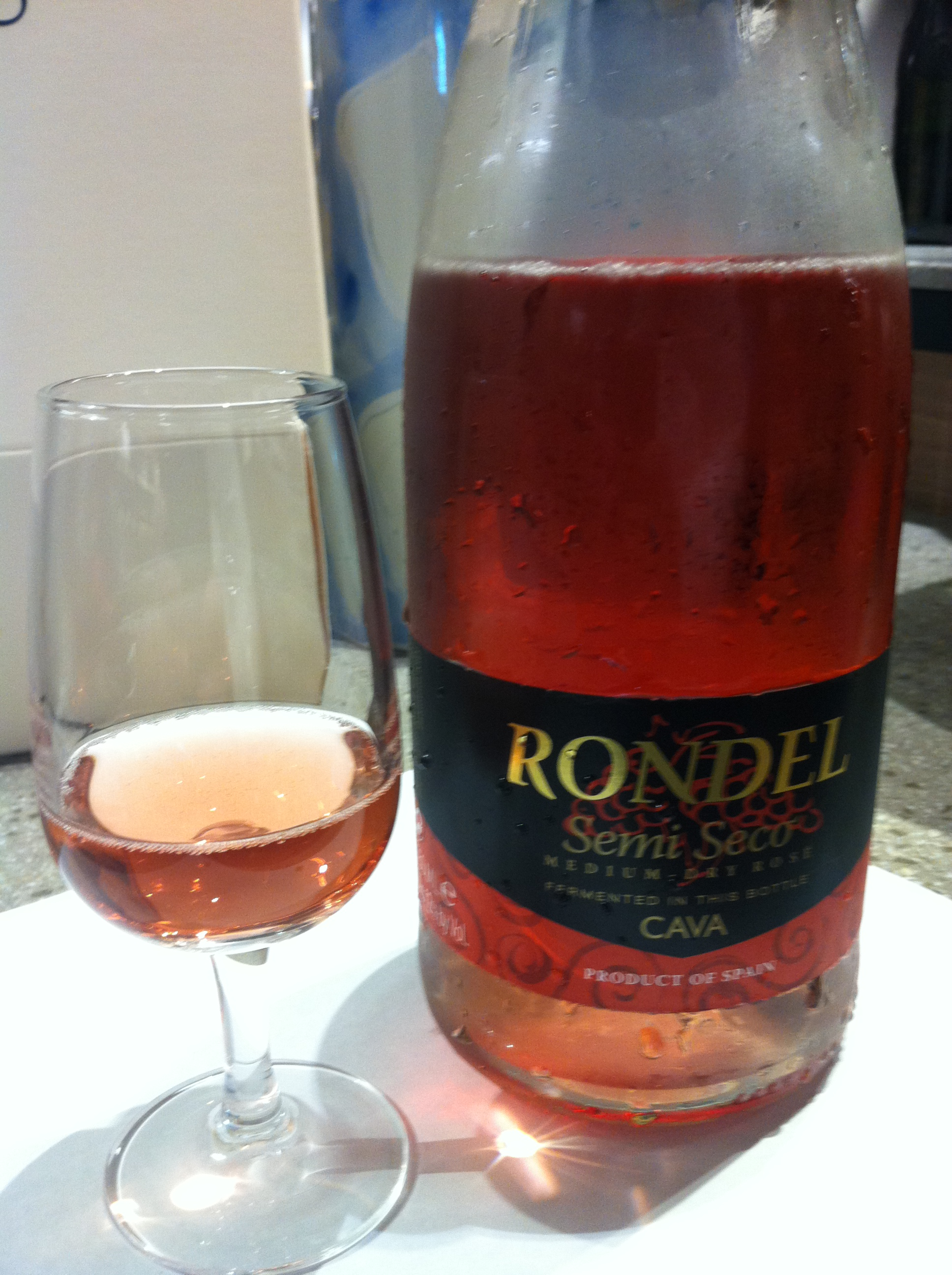
A semi-seco (semi-dry) rosado Cava

Cava is a Spanish sparkling wine made in the traditional method of the French sparkling wine Champagne. The definition of Cava is Vino Espumoso de Calidad Producido en una Región Determinada (VECPRD). It originated in the Catalonia region at the Codorníu Winery in the late 19th century. The wine was originally known as Champan until Spanish producers officially adopted the term "Cava" (cellar) in 1970 in reference to the underground cellars in which the wines ferment and age in the bottle. The early Cava industry was nurtured by the phylloxera epidemic of the late 19th century, which caused the destruction and uprooting of vineyards planted with red grape varieties. Inspired by the success of Champagne, vineyard owners started to replant with white grape varieties like Macabeo, Parellada, and Xarel·lo to use for sparkling wine production. These grapes are still the primary grapes of Cava today though some producers are experimenting with the use of the typical Champagne grapes of Chardonnay and Pinot noir.

For most of its existence, the production of Cava was not relegated to a particular region of DOP but rather to the grapes and method of production. Upon Spain's acceptance into the European Union in 1986, efforts were undertaken to designate specific areas for Cava production. Today use of the term "Cava" is restricted to production around select municipalities in Catalonia, Aragon, Castile and León, Valencia, Extremadura, Navarre, Basque Country, and Rioja. Around 95% of Spain's total Cava production is from Catalonia, with the village of Sant Sadurní d'Anoia being home to many of Spain's largest production houses.

== See also ==
- Winemaking
- Agriculture in Spain
