= Classification of wine =

System for classifying wines

The classification of wine is based on various criteria including place of origin or appellation, vinification method and style, sweetness and vintage, and the grape variety or varieties used. Practices vary in different countries and regions of origin, and many practices have varied over time. Some classifications enjoy official protection by being part of the wine law in their country of origin, while others have been created by, for example, growers' organizations without such protection.

== The term wine ==
Within the European Union, the term wine and its equivalents in other languages are reserved exclusively for the fermented juice of grapes.

In the United States, the term is also used for the fermented juice of any fruit or agricultural product, provided that it has an alcohol content of 7 to 24% (alcohol by volume) and is intended for non-industrial use. With the exceptions of cider, perry, and sake, such non-grape wines are to be labelled with the word wine qualified by a truthful description of the originating product: "honey wine", "dandelion wine", (blended) "fruit wine", etc.

Other jurisdictions have similar rules dictating the range of products qualifying as wine.

== By appellation ==
Historically, wines have been known by names reflecting their origin, and sometimes style: Bordeaux, Port, Rioja, Mosel and Chianti are all legally defined names reflecting the traditional wines produced in the named region. These naming conventions or "appellations" (as they are known in France) dictate not only where the grapes in a wine were grown but also which grapes went into the wine and how they were vinified. The appellation system is strongest in the European Union, but a related system, the American Viticultural Area, restricts the use of certain regional labels in America, such as Napa Valley, Santa Barbara and Willamette Valley. The AVA designations do not restrict the type of grape used.

In most of the world, wine labelled Champagne must be made from grapes grown in the Champagne region of France and fermented using a certain method, based on the international trademark agreements included in the 1919 Treaty of Versailles. However, in the United States, a legal definition called semi-generic has enabled U.S. winemakers to use certain generic terms (Champagne, Hock, Sherry, etc.) if there appears next to the term the actual appellation of origin.

More recently, wine regions in countries with less stringent location protection laws such as the United States and Australia have joined with well-known European wine producing regions to sign the Napa Declaration to Protect Wine Place and Origin, commonly known as the Napa Declaration on Place. This is a "declaration of joint principles stating the importance of location to wine and the need to protect place names". The Declaration was signed in July 2005 by four United States winegrowing regions and three European Union winegrowing regions.

The signatory regions from the US were Napa Valley, Washington, Oregon and Walla Walla, while the signatory regions from the EU were: Champagne, Cognac (the commune where Cognac is produced), Douro (the region where Port wine is produced) and Jerez (the region where Sherry is produced).

The list of signatories to the agreement expanded in March 2007 when Sonoma County, Paso Robles, Chianti Classico, Tokay, Victoria, Australia and Western Australia signed the Declaration at a ceremony in Washington, DC.

=== Regional wine classifications ===
Many regional wine classifications exist as part of tradition or appellation law. The most common of these is based on vineyard sites and include the Bordeaux Wine Official Classification of 1855, though some regions classify their wines based on the style like the German wine classification system. Vineyard classification has a long history dating from some early examples in Jurançon in the 14th century, in 1644 when the council of Würzburg ranked the city's vineyards by quality, and the early five-level designation of vineyards based on quality in Tokaj-Hegyalja in 1700.

Other well known classifications include:

- Classification of Saint-Émilion wine of Bordeaux
- Classification of Graves wine of Bordeaux
- Cru Bourgeois of Bordeaux (Médoc)
- Classified estates of Provence

The follow regions are classified by vineyards, not estate.

- Grand cru of Burgundy and Alsace

== By vinification methods and style ==
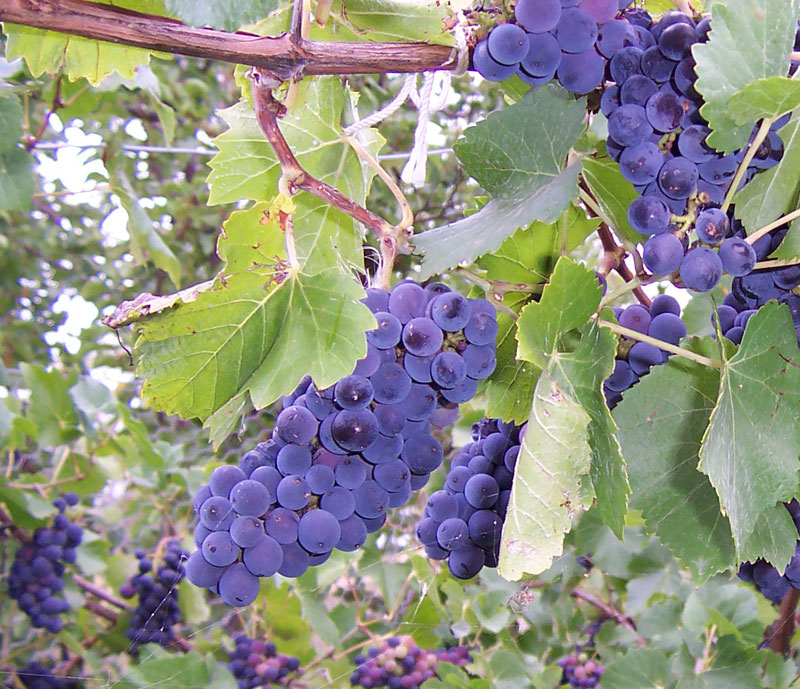
Dark purple wine grapes on the vine

Wines may be classified by vinification methods. These include classifications such as red or white wine, sparkling, semi-sparkling or still, fortified and dessert wines. The colour of wine is not determined by the juice of the grape, which is almost always clear, but rather by the presence or absence of the grape skin during fermentation. Grapes with coloured juice, for example alicante bouschet, are known as teinturier. Red wine is made from red (or black) grapes, but its red colour is bestowed by a process called maceration, whereby the skin is left in contact with the juice during fermentation. White wine can be made from any colour of grape as the skin is separated from the juice during fermentation. A white wine made from a very dark grape may appear pink or 'blush'. A form of Rosé is called Blanc de Noirs where the juice of red grapes is allowed contact with the skins for a very short time (usually only a couple of hours).

=== Sparkling and still wines ===
Sparkling wines, such as champagne, contain carbon dioxide which is produced naturally from fermentation or force-injected later. To have this effect, the wine is fermented twice, once in an open container to allow the carbon dioxide to escape into the air, and a second time in a sealed container where the gas is caught and remains in the wine. Sparkling wines that gain their carbonation from the traditional method of bottle fermentation are labelled "bottle fermented", "méthode traditionelle", or "méthode champenoise". The latter designation was outlawed for all wines other than champagne (which for obvious reasons does not bother to utilize it) in Europe in 1994.

Other terms for sparkling wine in other languages include Sekt or Schaumwein (Germany), cava (Spain), spumante (Italy) and espumante (Portugal). Semi-sparkling wines are sparkling wines that contain less than 2.5 atmospheres of carbon dioxide at sea level and 20 °C. Some countries such as the UK impose a higher tax on fully sparkling wines. Examples of semi-sparkling synonym terms are frizzante in Italy, vino de aguja in Spain, and pétillant in France. In most countries except the United States, champagne is legally defined as sparkling wine originating from the Champagne wine region in France, especially the city of Reims and the town of Épernay.

Still wines are wines that have not gone through the sparkling wine method and have no effervescence.

=== Dessert and fortified wine ===
Dessert wines range from slightly sweet (with less than 50 g/L of sugar) to incredibly sweet wines (with over 400 g/L of sugar). Late harvest wines such as Spätlese are made from grapes harvested well after they have reached maximum ripeness. Dried grape wines, such as Recioto and Vin Santo from Italy, are made from grapes that have been partially raisined after harvesting. Botrytized wines are made from grapes infected by the mold Botrytis cinerea or noble rot. These include Sauternes from Bordeaux, numerous wines from Loire such as Bonnezeaux and Quarts de Chaume, Tokaji Aszú from Hungary, and Beerenauslese. Ice Wine is made from grapes that are harvested while they are frozen. Fortified wines are often sweeter, and generally more alcoholic wines that have had their fermentation process stopped by the addition of a spirit, such as brandy, or have had additional spirit added after fermentation. Examples include Port, Madeira and Sherry.

=== Other styles ===
Table wines are inexpensive wines that often do not specify the grape variety used or the region of origin. Some equivalent terms for "table wine" in other languages are "vin de table" (French), "vino da tavola" (Italian), "Tafelwein" (German), and "vino de mesa" (Spanish).

Cooking wine or cooking sherry usually refers to inexpensive grape wine (or rice wine in Chinese and other East Asian cuisine) which is intended for use as an ingredient in food rather than as a beverage. Cooking wine typically available in North America is treated with salt to allow its sale in non-licensed grocery stores. This also acts as a preservative, as the salt in cooking wine inhibits the growth of the microorganisms that produce acetic acid. This will preserve a bottle of cooking wine, which may be opened and used occasionally over a long period of time.

In other countries sherry wine is used for cooking. Fortified wines resist spoilage, as their alcohol content is too high to permit bacterial growth.

== By vintage or variety ==
A vintage wine is one made from grapes that were all, or mostly, grown in a single specified year, and are accordingly dated as such. Consequently, it is not uncommon for wine enthusiasts and traders to save bottles of an especially good vintage wine for future consumption. However, there is some disagreement and research about the significance of vintage year to wine quality. Most countries allow a vintage wine to include a portion of wine that is not from the labeled vintage.

A varietal wine is wine made from a dominant grape such as a Chardonnay or a Cabernet Sauvignon and labeled by the name of the grape variety. The wine may not be entirely of that one grape and varietal labeling laws differ. In the United States a wine needs to be composed of at least 75% of a particular grape to be labeled as a varietal wine. In the European Union, a minimum of 85% is required if the name of a single variety is displayed, and if two or more varieties are mentioned, they combined must make up 100% and they must be listed in descending order. E.g., a mixture of 70% Chardonnay and 30% Viognier must be called Chardonnay-Viognier rather than Viognier-Chardonnay.

== See also ==
- Classification of Champagne vineyards
- Bordeaux Wine Official Classification of 1855
- Langton's Classification of Australian Wine
- Protected designation of origin
- Quinta classification of Port vineyards in the Douro
