= Catalunya DOP =

Spanish wine geographic indication

Coordinates: 41.8167°N 1.46667°E

- Wine region
- Catalunya DO in the provinces of Barcelona, Tarragona, Lleida and Girona in the region of Catalonia
- Official name: D.O.P. Catalunya
- Type: Denominación de Origen Protegida (DOP)
- Year established: 2001
- Country: Spain
- Size of planted vineyards: 42,431 hectares (104,849 acres)
- No. of wineries: 226
- Wine produced: 379,736 hectolitres
- Comments: Data for 2016 / 2017

Catalunya DO in Catalonia

Catalunya is a Spanish Denominación de Origen Protegida (DOP) (Denominació d'Origen Protegida in Catalan) for Catalan wine which was formally recognised in 2001. It was created with the specific purpose of providing commercial support to over 200 wineries (bodegas) that produced quality wine but which were not included in other specific DOP's in Catalonia. It does not have a specific geographical location but is formed by over 40 km^{2} of individual vineyards which are dispersed all over Catalonia, and allows mixing of grapes from other DOPs.

== Subregions ==
For details regarding climate, soil type, wines produced etc., see the other DOP's in Catalonia:

- Alella
- Cava
- Conca de Barberà
- Costers del Segre
- Empordà
- Montsant
- Penedès
- Pla de Bages
- Priorat
- Tarragona
- Terra Alta

== Authorised Grape Varieties ==
The authorised grape varieties are:

- Red: Cabernet Franc, Cabernet Sauvignon, Garnatxa Negra, Garnatxa Peluda, Garnatxa Roja (Garnatxa Gris), Garnatxa tintorera, Merlot, Monastrell, Petit Verdot, Picapoll Negre, Pinot Noir, Samsó / Carinyena, Sumoll, Sirah, Trepat, Ull de llebre, Xarel·lo Vermell.
- White: Albarinho, Chardonnay, Chenin, Garnatxa Blanca, Gewürtztraminer, Macabeu, Malvasía, Malvasía de Sitges, Moscatell d’Alejandria, Moscatel de Frontignan, Parellada, Pedro Ximénez, Picapoll Blanc, Riesling, Sauvignon Blanc, Sumoll Blanc, Viognier, Vinyater, Xarel·lo
