= Empordà (DO) =

Wine-producing region

Coordinates: 42°23′17.88″N 3°0′4.28″E

Empordà DOP
- Wine region
- Empordà DOP in the province of Girona in the region of Catalonia
- Official name: D.O.P. Empordà
- Type: Denominación de Origen Protegida (DOP)
- Year established: 1972
- Country: Spain
- Size of planted vineyards: 1,756 hectares (4,339 acres)
- No. of wineries: 43
- Wine produced: 35,965 hectolitres
- Comments: Data for 2016 / 2017

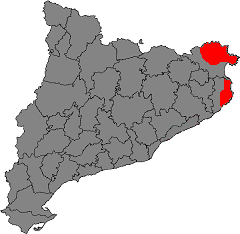
Empordà DOP in Catalonia

Empordà is a Spanish Denominación de Origen Protegida (DOP) (Denominació d'Origen Protegida in Catalan) for wines produced in the northeastern corner of Catalonia, Spain in the province of Girona.

The region generally extends from the town of Figueres northwards to the French border and the French wine-making regions of Banyuls and Côtes du Roussillon. To the south, it extends through Baix Empordà near the Mediterranean Sea. The DOP is crossed by the rivers Muga, Llobregat and Manol which flow eastwards to the sea.

== History ==
Archaeologists have suggested that vines were first introduced to this region by the Phoenicians in the 5th century BC. The ancient Romans and the Benedictine monks later also contributed. The first written documentation dates from 1130 and was a treatise on wine written by Father Pere de Novas in the Monastery of Sant Pere de Rodes.

As in Penedès, this area used to produce strong sweet wines which were very popular until the 1930s. The region acquired its DO status in 1972.

Throughout the mid 20th century, the wineries were mostly cooperatives focused on cheap, bulk wine production. In the late 1990s and in to the first decade of the 21st century, the focus shifted a great deal towards smaller, craft wineries, which in turn worked to improve the wine quality of the region overall. Until 2006, it was initially known as DO Empordà-Costa Brava to associate the large tourist beach area with the region.

== Geography ==
The DOP is divided into two subzones: the northern Alt Empordà subzone on the slopes of the Alberes Rodes mountains near the French border, and the southern Baix Empordà subzone on the slopes of the Montgrí and Gabarres Massifs.

== Soils ==
The soils are generally dark, with a certain lime content, loose, good drainage and poor in organic matter. There is some granite content near the coast as well as up in the mountainous regions near the French border.

== Climate ==
The climate is Mediterranean, with influences from the moisture bearing winds from the south and cold winds from the north, especially the Tramontana, which can sometimes attain speeds of 120 km/h. The wind is quite crucial to the winemaking process as it greatly reduces the occurrence of mildew as well as pests, thus making organic farming an easier endeavor.

The average annual temperature is 16 °C (max 29 °C, min 1.5 °C) and there is abundant rainfall over the course of the year, between 600 and 700 mm/yr, falling mainly in winter and spring.

== Wines ==
While historically Empordà was known for producing rosé wines, the majority of their production is red at 60%, white at 19%, and rosé at 17%. The remaining 4% is released as traditional wines including dessert versions of Grenache and Moscatell. A bit more than half of the wines sold in the region are bottled and the remainder are sold as bulk wines. There is a significant amount of Cava produced under the DOP Cava in the approved villages.

== Authorised Grape Varieties ==
The grape varieties are:

- Red, recommended: Samsó and Garnatxa Negra / Lledoner Negre
- Red, authorised: Cabernet Sauvignon, Cabernet Franc, Merlot, Monastrell, Ull de llebre, Syrah, and Garnatxa Peluda
- White, recommended: Garnatxa Blanca / Lledoner Blanc, Garnatxa Roja (Garnatxa Gris), Macabeu / Viura, and Moscatell d’Alexandria
- White, authorised: Chardonnay, Gewurztraminer, Malvasia, Moscatell de Gra Petit, Picapoll Blanc, Sauvignon Blanc, and Xarel·lo

== DOP Empordà wine route ==
Some wineries in the Empordà region are grouped under the umbrella of the DOP Empordà wine route to promote wine tourism in the area. This body is coordinated by the Patronat de Turisme de la Costa Brava with the participation of the Consell Regulador de la Denominació d’Origen Empordà. The DOP Empordà wine route aims to promote wine tourism locally and internationally. The route also brings together other tourist activities from the area linked to the world of wine and grapes. Celler Peralada is an emblematic building and state of the art in leaving a minimum environmental impact during winemaking process in this region.

== See also ==
- Catalan wine
- Enotourism
