= Marselan =

French wine

- Grape (Vitis)
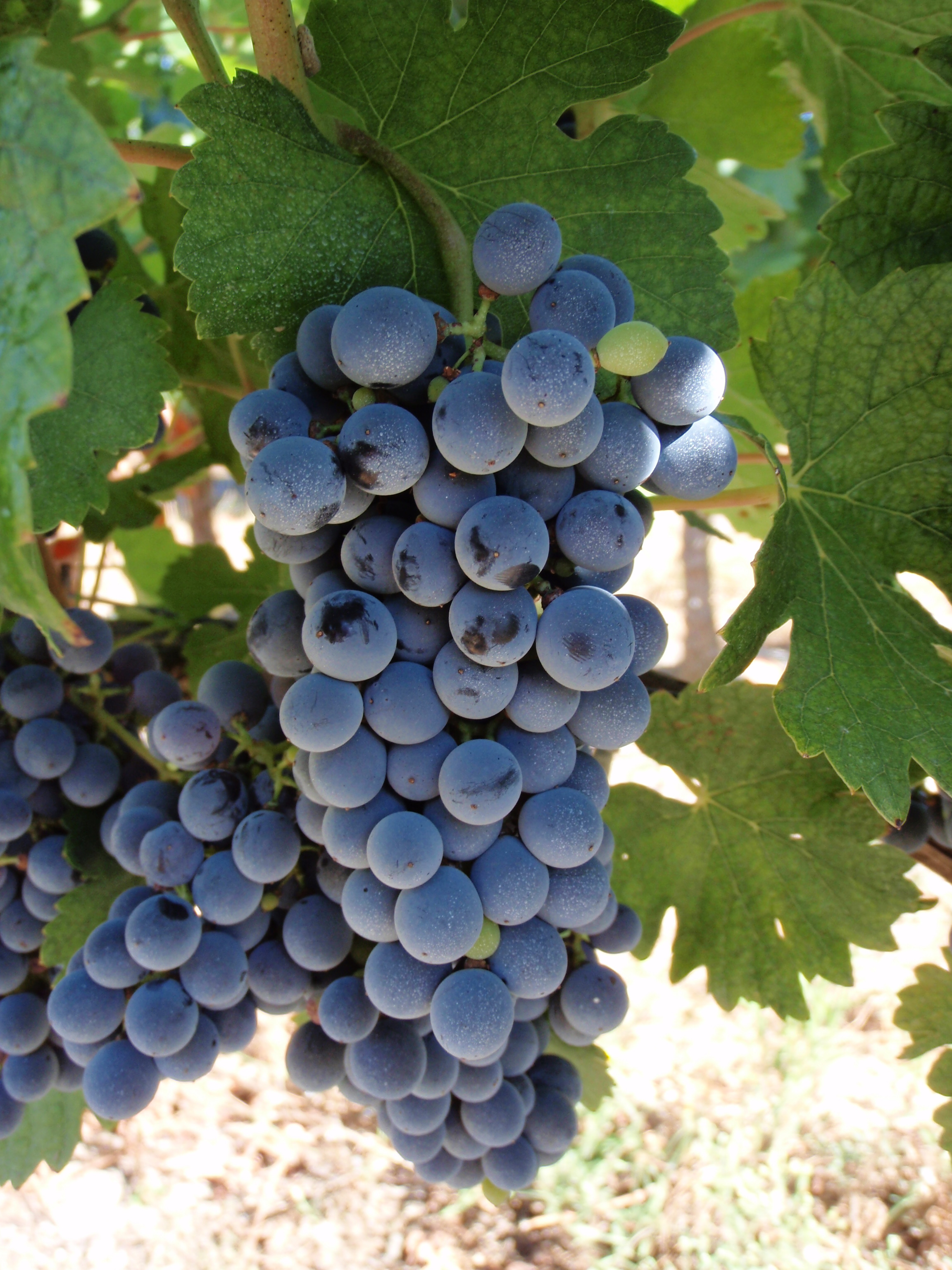
- Marselan grapes
- Color of berry skin: Noir
- Species: Vitis vinifera
- Origin: France
- Notable regions: Languedoc, California, China, Palestine
- VIVC number: 16383

Marselan is a red French wine grape variety that is a cross between Cabernet Sauvignon and Grenache. It was first bred in 1961 by Paul Truel near the French town of Marseillan. The vine is grown mostly in the Languedoc wine region with some plantings in the Northern Coast of California. It has also become very popular in China. The grape usually produces a medium body red wine.

Along with Cabernet Sauvignon and Merlot, Marselan is one of the grapes planted in the Sino-French Demonstration Vineyard, a collaboration project between the Chinese and French government intended to generate interest in grape winemaking in China by demonstrating French grapes and winemaking techniques.

== History ==
Marselan was bred by French ampelographer Paul Truel in 1961 at the Institut National de la Recherche Agronomique (INRA) as part of a collaboration with the École nationale supérieure agronomique de Montpellier (ENSAM) to produce high yielding varieties with large berries of moderate quality. As Marselan could only produce small berries, the vine variety was shelved and considered not likely to be commercially released.

But viticulture trends in the late 20th century that began to value lower yielding varieties with good disease resistance to hazards like powdery mildew encouraged the INRA to revisit Marselan. The vine was submitted for approval for commercial release and was entered in the official register of grape varieties in 1990.

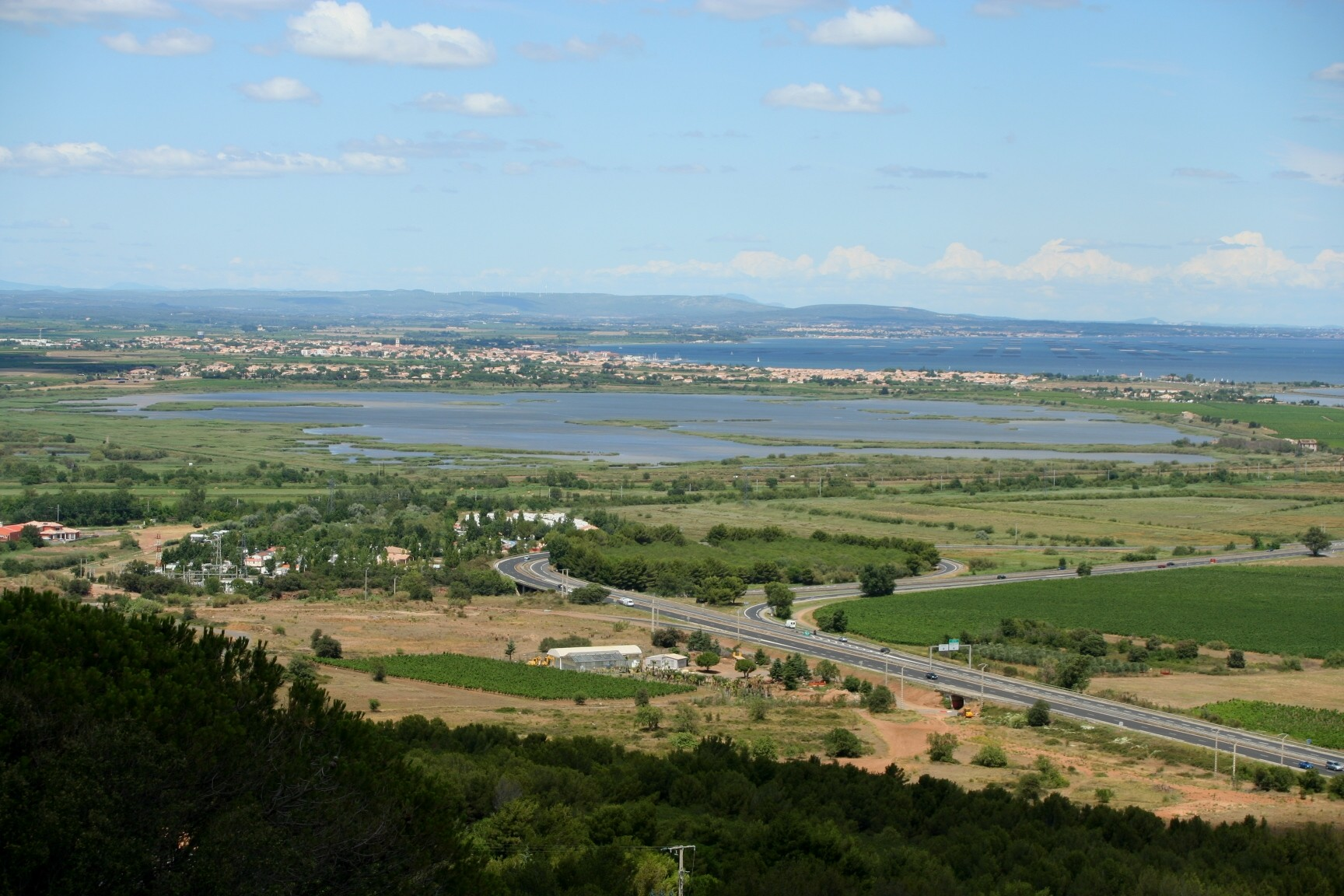
Marselan is named after the Hérault commune Marseillan where the INRA vineyard collection at Domaine de Vassal is located.

In 2007, the name "Marselan" was approved by the US Alcohol and Tobacco Tax and Trade Bureau (TTB) for use on wine labels imported to the United States, meaning that varietal version of the wine that are labeled as such can be sold on the US market.

The name "Marselan" is taken from the French coastal town of Marseillan located between Béziers and Montpellier where the phylloxera-safe vine collection of Domaine de Vassal is located. Operated by the INRA, Domaine de Vassal provided Marselan's parent Cabernet Sauvignon and Grenache vines which Truel used in his breeding.

== Viticulture ==
Marselan tends to produce large clusters of small berries that are mid-late ripening. It has strong disease resistance to botrytis bunch rot and powdery mildew as well as to coulure and mites.

== Wine regions ==
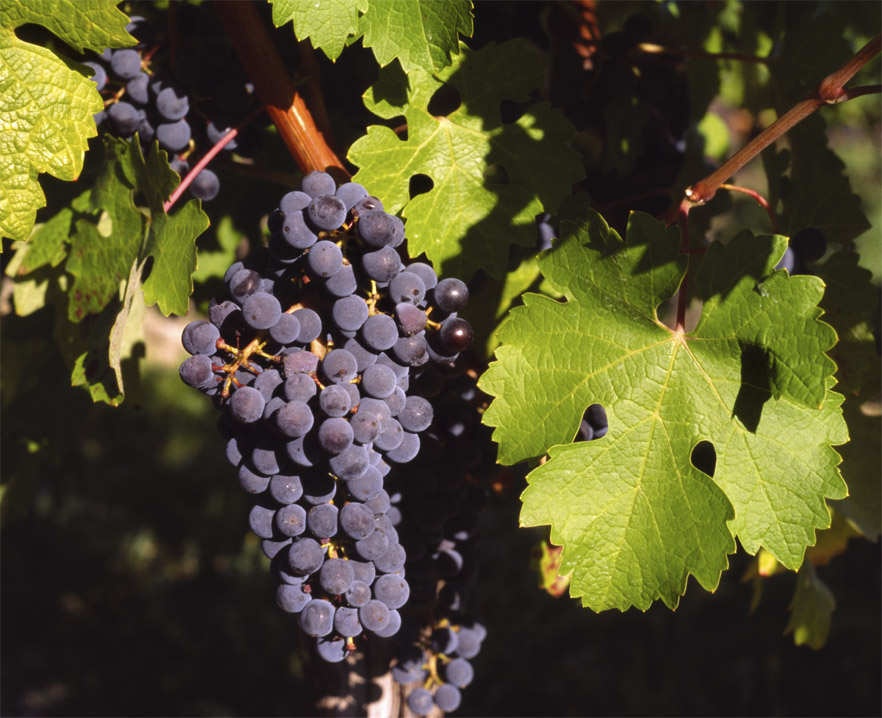
Cabernet Sauvignon, one of the parent varieties of Marselan.

=== Europe ===
As of 2009, there were 3,351 acres (1,356 hectares) of Marselan planted in France, mostly in the Languedoc and southern Rhône Valley. It is mainly used in blends though some varietal examples have been produced in the Languedoc with the first varietal Marselan being produced in 2002 in Carcassonne. In 2019, Marselan became one of four new red grapes authorized in Bordeaux wine production to combat temperature increases in Bordeaux.

The first Marselan vines were planted in Spain in 1990 in the Catalonia region across the Pyrénées from the Languedoc-Roussillon region. Today it can be in the Penedès, Terra Alta and Valencia regions.

In Switzerland, Marselan is blended with Arinarnoa, Caladoc, Carminoir, Ederena, Egiodola, and Malbec in the town of Chardonne in the Vaud canton.

=== Americas ===
A Bakersfield, California nursery has been selling cuttings of the variety to California wine producers in the North Coast region. It is also being grown in Benton City, Washington, at Elk Haven Winery and Zeron Vineyards, in Willcox, Arizona, at Dragoon Vineyards. In Argentina, Marselan was introduced in 1998 and as of 2008 there were 195 acres (79 hectares) planted mostly in the Mendoza wine region. In 2007, Brazil reported 59 acres (24 hectares) of the vine.

=== Asia ===
A collaboration between the Chinese and French government brought Marselan to China to where it is now planted in the Sino-French Demonstration Vineyard in Huailai County in the northwestern reaches of the Hebei province near a section of the Great Wall. The First Growth Bordeaux wine estate of Château Lafite Rothschild is also growing Marselan in China at their Penglai, Shandong vineyard which they own in partnership with the Chinese investment company CITIC Group. In 2016 133 ha to 200 ha are estimated to have been planted in China.

== Styles ==
Marselan was bred to combine the finesse and quality of Cabernet Sauvignon to the color potential, heat tolerance and high yielding capabilities of Grenache. The flavor of varietal Marselan has been described by one buyer for US-based K&L Wine Merchants as "not what most Americans expect from Cab[ernet Sauvignon]."

According to Master of wine Jancis Robinson, Marselan tends to produce deeply colored and highly aromatic wines that have supple tannins and the potential to age.
