= Costers del Segre =

Spanish wine geographical indication

Coordinates: 41°36′08″N 0°34′23″E

Costers del Segre DOP
- Wine region
- Costers del Segre DOP in the province of Lleida in the region of Catalonia
- Official name: D.O.P. Costers del Segre
- Type: Denominación de Origen Protegida (DOP)
- Year established: 1988
- Country: Spain
- Size of planted vineyards: 4,081 hectares (10,084 acres)
- No. of wineries: 36
- Wine produced: 29,803 hectolitres
- Comments: Data for 2016 / 2017

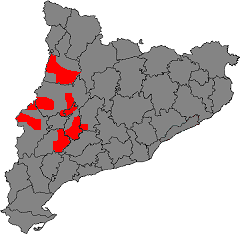
Costers del Segre DOP in Catalonia

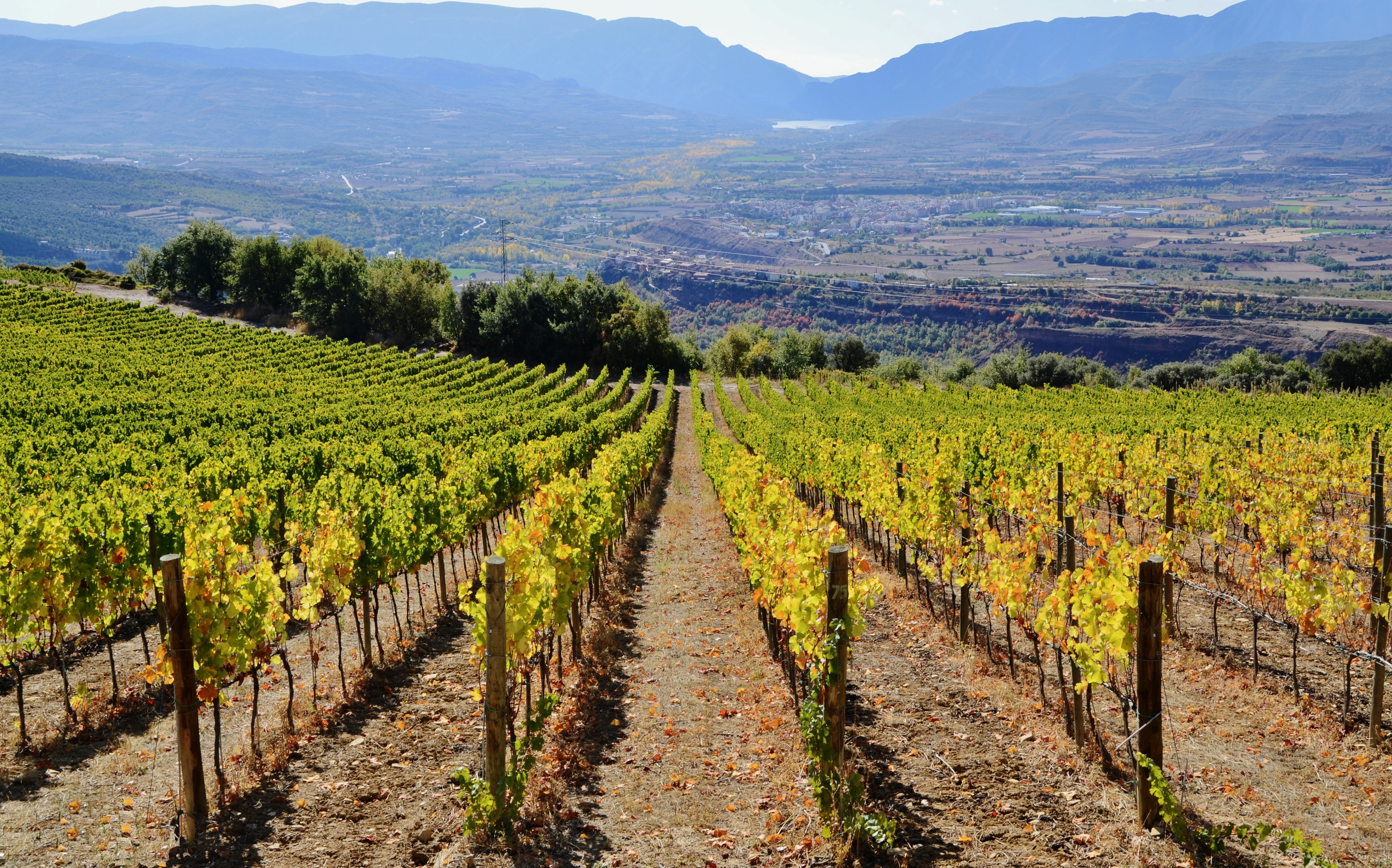
Vineyards of Castell d'Encus Winery, Talarn, Costers del Segre DOP

Costers del Segre is a Spanish Denominación de Origen Protegida (DOP) (Denominació d'Origen Protegida in Catalan) for wines located in the province of Lleida (Catalonia, Spain) and is divided into several separate sub-zones. The four original subzones created in 1988 are Artesa, to the northeast of Lleida, Valls de Riucorb to the east, Garrigues and Raïmat. In 1998 two other subzones were added: Pallars Jussà, next to the town of Tremp, 90 km north of Lleida and Segrià to the west and surrounded by the Raimat subzone.

== Climate ==
The climate is continental (hot summers and cold winters), influenced by the proximity of the Pyrenees, though rainfall is sparse. Average rainfall is around 450 mm though 300 mm is common in the west. Average annual temperature is 15 °C (max 35 °C in summer, minimum below zero in winter). There are also extreme variations between daytime and night-time temperatures all year. Drought, hailstones and spring frosts are occasional risks for the vineyards.

== Soils ==
Even though the vineyards are dispersed geographically, most are on dark lime bearing soils, with a high lime content, low clay content and poor in organic matter. Height varies between 250 m and 700 m above sea level.

== Authorised Grape Varieties ==
The authorised grape varieties are:

- Red: Garnatxa Negra, Ull de llebre, i.e.,Tinto Fino, Trepat, Cabernet Sauvignon, Merlot, Monastrell / Garrut, Sumoll, Syrah, Mazuela / Samsó, Pinot Noir, Cabernet Franc, Garnatxa Tintorera, Petit Verdot, and Malbec
- White: Macabeu, Xarel·lo, Parellada, Chardonnay, Garnatxa Blanca, Riesling, Sauvignon Blanc, Moscatell d’Alexandria, Malvasia / Subirat Parent, Gewürztraminer, Albarinho, Chenin, Viognier, Verdejo, and Godello

The older vines grow as low bushes (en vaso), while the more recently planted ones are on trellises (en espaldera) so as to allow mechanisation of vineyards activities. Maximum authorised planting density is 2,500 vines/ha. The vineyards in the west of the province use irrigation systems to mitigate the effects of the cold and the heat.

== See also ==
- Catalan wine
