= Tarragona (DO) =

Coordinates: 41°8′N 1°15′E

Tarragona DOP
- Wine region
- Tarragona DOP in the province of Tarragona in the region of Catalonia
- Official name: D.O.P. Tarragona
- Type: Denominación de Origen Protegida (DOP)
- Year established: 1945
- Country: Spain
- No. of vineyards: 4,874 hectares (12,044 acres)
- No. of wineries: 32
- Wine produced: 13,200 hectolitres
- Comments: Data for 2016 / 2017

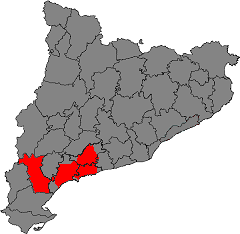
Tarragona DO in Catalonia

Tarragona is a Spanish Denominación de Origen Protegida (DOP) (Denominació d'Origen Protegida in Catalan) for Catalan wines, located in the province of Tarragona (Catalonia, Spain) and covers two distinct areas: the Camp de Tarragona and the Ribera d'Ebre comarca (district).

== History ==
Tarragona has been renowned for its sweet red wines since the times of the ancient Romans, when it was exported to Rome. The area under vines expanded greatly in the nineteenth century to the point that in 1900 over 50% of the province was covered by vineyards. It was badly affected by the outbreak of the phylloxera plague at that time. In 1932 the wines from the area were given a form of legal protection, and in 1945 it acquired DO status.

== Geography ==
The vineyards are located along the coast and extend inland towards the border with the province of Lleida. There are two official sub-zones: Camp de Tarragona is the largest one containing 70% of the vines and extending around the north and east of Tarragona in a radius of 30 km, at an altitude of around 200 m above sea level. The second sub-zone, Ribera d’Ebre, is located to the south and west of Tarragona. The vines here are on small plateaus on the banks of the River Ebro at an altitude of between 100 m to 400 m above sea level.

== Soils ==
In Camp de Taragona, the soils are dark with a considerable content of lime, while the sub soil is alluvial. In Ribera d’Ebre the soils are fertile and alluvial in nature, especially if close to the river.

== Climate ==
The climate is Mediterranean with continental influences in the higher part of the Ebro river valley. Annual rainfall varies between 475 mm in Camp de Tarragona and 650 mm in the Ribera d’Ebre. The average annual temperature is 16 °C (max 35 °C in summer, min 3 °C in winter). The risk of frost is very slight.

== Authorised Grape Varieties ==
The authorised grape varieties are:

- Red: Ull de llebre, Sumoll, Carinenya, Garnatxa Negra, Merlot, Cabernet Sauvignon, Pinot Noir, and Syrah
- White: Macabeu, Cartoixà / Xarel·lo, Parellada, Moscatel de Frontignan, Moscatell d’Alejandria, Garnatxa Blanca, Malvasía de Sitges, Subirat Parent / Malvasia, Xarel·lo Vermell, Sumoll Blanc, Chardonnay, Sauvignon Blanc, and Vinyater

The older vines are planted as low bushes (en vaso) while the newer ones are on trellises (en espaldera). In both cases they are planted at intervals of 1.4 m between vines and 2.8 m between rows (marco real).

== Wines produced ==
Most wineries in Tarragona DOP now produce and bottle modern reds, whites, and rosés. Only a few still produce the traditional wines:

- Rancios (rancid) wines are left out in the sun in glass demijohns and are then aged for at least four years in oak barrels
- Tarragona Clásico (Classic Tarragona) is made with 100% very ripe Tempranillo grapes, and is fermented until it attains a maximum of 17% alcohol. It is then aged for twelve years in oak containers of up to a maximum capacity of 2,000 litres. Sometimes the solera system is used.
- Sweet dessert wine is aged for five to ten years in vats, oak casks or in the bottle.
