= Celler Castell d'Encus =

Spanish winery

Coordinates: 42°12′27″N 0°53′56″E

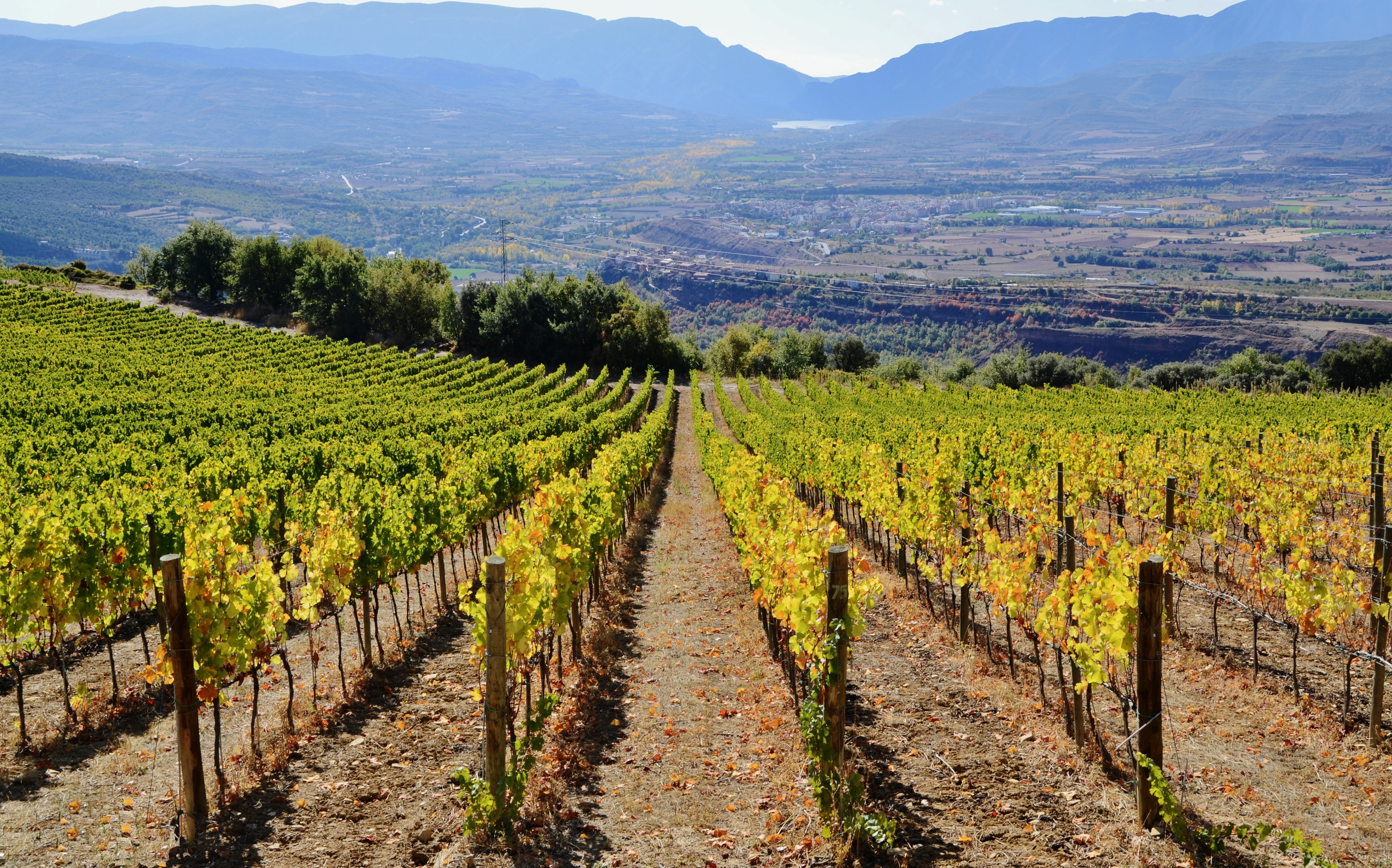
- Vineyards
- Location: Talarn, Catalonia, Spain
- Appellation: DOP Costers del Segre
- Founded: 2001
- First vintage: 2008
- Key people: Raül Bobet, Winemaker and Owner
- Cases/yr: 6000
- Known for: Taïka 2013
- Varietals: Cabernet Sauvignon, Cabernet Franc, Merlot, Pinot Noir, Syrah, Petit Verdot, Sauvignon Blanc, Riesling, Semillon, Albariño
- Distribution: International
- Website: www.castelldencus.com

Celler Castell d'Encus is a winery in the Costers del Segre DOP, in Western Catalonia. The vineyards are located between 850 and 1250 metres asl in the Spanish Pre-Pyrenees, making them the highest vineyards in Catalonia. The winery's name comes from the nearby abandoned medieval village and castle of Castelló d'Encús (ca).

Founded in 2001, the winery's first harvest was in 2008. Since then, the winery has quickly built up a reputation for producing quality wines, with a number of both of its red and white wines receiving more than 90 points in the Spanish wine guide, Guía Peñín, and over 90 points by Parker. The winery follows organic farming practices, and uses geothermal energy in an effort to reduce energy expenditure and therefore its environmental impact.

Along with using wood and steel tanks, the winery is using the medieval wine vats that are cut into the sandstone bedrock and date back to the 12th century.

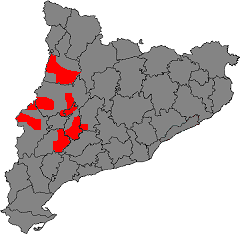
Costers del Segre DOP in Catalonia

== See also ==
- Catalan wine
