= Ribera del Guadiana =

Protected designation for Spanish wine

Coordinates: 38°41′N 6°24′W

Ribera del Guadiana DO
- Wine region
- Ribera del Guadiana DO in the provinces of Cáceres and Badajoz in the region of Extremadura
- Official name: D.O. Ribera del Guadiana
- Type: Denominación de Origen Protegida (DOP)
- Year established: 1999
- Country: Spain
- Sub-regions: Tierra de Barros, Cañamero, Montánchez, Ribera Baja, Ribera Alta and Matanegra
- Size of planted vineyards: 35,797 hectares (88,456 acres)
- No. of wineries: 26
- Wine produced: 73,795 hectolitres
- Comments: Data for 2016 / 2017

Ribera del Guadiana is a Spanish Denominación de Origen Protegida (DOP) for wines located in the region of Extremadura (Spain). It extends over two provinces, Cáceres in the north and Badajoz in the south. It takes its name from the River Guadiana, which flows through the region from east to west.

== History ==
The region was officially created in 1999 by combining the six sub-zones that up till then had produced Vino de la Tierra, a lower quality of wine on the Spanish quality scale.

== Sub-zones ==
Ribera del Guadiana DO showing the 6 subzones

The DOP is divided into 6 sub-zones, of which Tierra de Barros is the largest, comprising 80% of the vines.

=== Tierra de Barros ===
The Tierra de Barros sub-zone covers 36 municipalities. The soil is clayey with very good moisture retention properties and has a high lime content. The lie of the land is flat which allowed the mechanization of vineyards activities.

=== Cañamero ===
The Cañamero sub-zone covers 5 municipalities in the Sierra de Guadalupe range to the east of the province of Cáceres at an elevation of over 800 m above sea level. The vines are planted on slopes on poor soil over a slate stratum.

=== Montánchez ===
The Montánchez sub-zone covers 27 municipalities to the south of Cáceres. The land comprises hills and valleys, with rich, brown, slightly acidic soil at an elevation of about 625 m above sea level.

=== Ribera Baja ===
The Ribera Baja sub-zone to the west covers 11 municipalities and reaches to the Portuguese frontier. The soils are clayey and alluvial at a low elevation of about 250 m above sea level.

=== Ribera Alta ===
The Ribera Alta sub-zone to the east covers 38 municipalities at an elevation of about 400 m. The soils are sandy and not very deep.

=== Matanegra ===
The Matanegra sub-zone is further to the south covering 8 municipalities. The soils are similar to those in Tierra de Barros, while the climate is cooler due to the higher elevation of over 600 m above sea level.

== Climate ==
Extremadura has a continental climate: hot dry summers when temperatures can reach 40 °C, and cold winters when they can drop to 0 °C.

Rainfall varies according to the sub-zone in question, and can be considerable in the mountainous areas, such as Cañamero. The average rainfall is 450 mm/year. The main challenges faced by the grape growers is drought in summer and frosts in spring.

== Grapes ==
The DOP Regulatory Council authorizes the use of 39 different grape varieties, some of which are native to the area and are not grown in the rest of Spain. Cayetana blanca is the most widely planted white variety Tempranillo is the most widely planted red variety.

- Red: Bobal, Cabernet Sauvignon, Graciano, Garnacha Tinta, Garnacha Tintorera, Jaén Tinto, Mazuela, Merlot, Monastrell, Pinot Noir, Petit Verdot, Syrah, Tempranillo / Cencibel / Tinto Fino, Touriga Nacional, Castelão, Trincadeira, Malbec.
- White: Alarije, Borba, Cayetana Blanca, Cigüente, Pardina (synonym of Cayetana Blanca), Viura / Macabeo, Chardonnay, Chelva / Montúa, Eva / Beba de los Santos, Malvar, Moscatel de Alejandría, Moscatel de Grano Menudo, Parellada, Perruno, Sauvignon Blanc, Pedro Ximénez, Verdejo, Antão Vaz, Arinto, Fernão Pires, Colombard, Xarel·lo.
