= Pla de Bages =

Coordinates: 41°43′14″N 1°50′23″E

Pla de Bages DOP
- Wine region
- Pla de Bages DOP in the province of Barcelona in the region of Catalonia
- Official name: D.O.P. Pla de Bages
- Type: Denominación de Origen Protegida (DOP)
- Year established: 1997
- Country: Spain
- Size of planted vineyards: 480 hectares (1,186 acres)
- No. of wineries: 16
- Wine produced: 3,689 hectolitres
- Comments: Data for 2016 / 2017

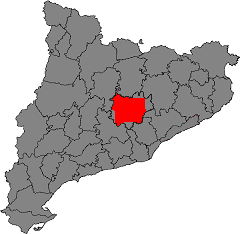
Pla de Bages DO in Catalonia

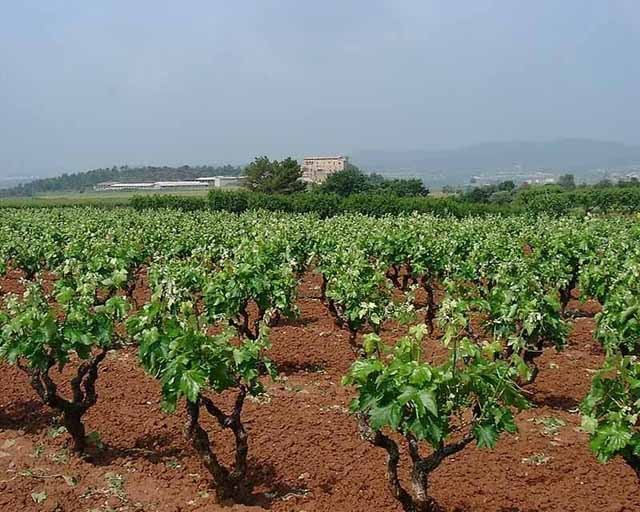
Vineyard in the Pla de Bages DOP, Artés, Bages

Pla de Bages is a Spanish Denominación de Origen Protegida (DOP) (Denominació d'Origen Protegida in Catalan) for Catalan wines, located in the province of Barcelona (Catalonia, Spain), and is one of the smallest DOPs in Spain, covering less than 500 hectares. It is also one of the newest having acquired its official status in 1997.

== History ==
In wine-making contexts the name of Bages is often said to derive from an otherwise unnoted ancient Roman city of Bacassis located in the area. According to an unidentified mediaeval document from the former Benedictine monastery of Sant Benet, the Roman city was named in honour of Bacchus, the Roman god of wine.

Production in the area was interrupted for almost a century after the outbreak of the phylloxera plague at the end of the 19th century.

== Geography ==
The vineyards are mainly located in the valleys of the River Llobregat and its tributaries.

== Soils ==
There are two different types of soil in two well-defined topographies: a central basin (Pla de Bages) with clay and marl soils at an altitude of 200 m above sea level; and a peripheral area (Alt Bages, "Upper Bages") where marl and lime bearing soils with a high carbonate content abound, at an altitude of 500 m above sea level.

== Climate ==
The climate is Mediterranean with strong continental influences due to its inland location quite far from the sea. Humidity is lower, summers hotter and winters colder than in other wine-producing areas in Catalonia. The average annual temperature is 13°C (max 35°C in summer, -5°C in winter) and there are considerable temperature variations between day and night as well. Average annual rainfall is between 500 mm and 600 mm.

== Authorised Grape Varieties ==
The authorised grape varieties are:

- Red: Mandó, Sumoll, Picapoll Negre, Garnatxa Negra, Ull de llebre, Merlot, Cabernet Sauvignon, Cabernet Franc, and Syrah
- White: Macabeu / Viura, Parellada, Picapoll Blanc, Chardonnay, Sauvignon Blanc, Gewürtztraminer, and Malvasía

The newer vineyards are planted on trellises (en espaldera) to allow mechanisation of the vineyard activities, at authorised planting densities of between 2,000 and 4,500 vines/ha depending on the terrain.
