= Carignan =

Red wine grape variety

- Grape (Vitis)
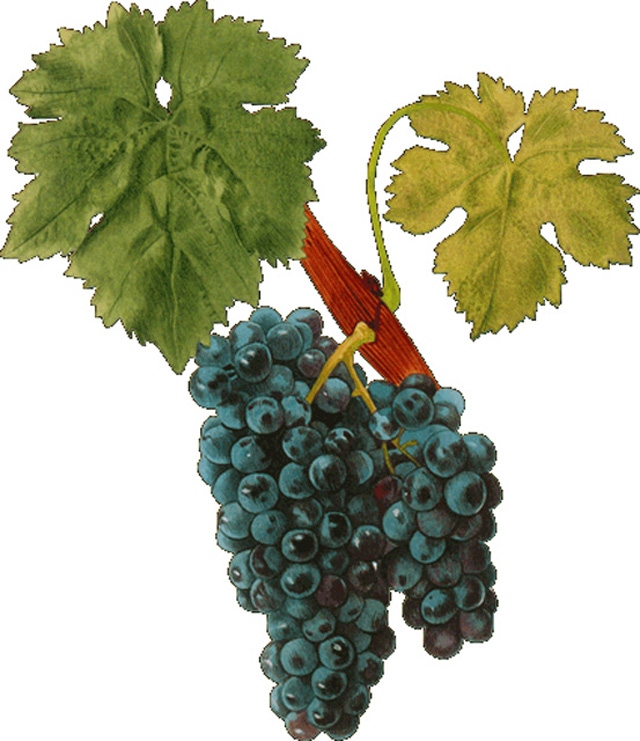
- Carignan in Viala & Vermorel
- Color of berry skin: Noir
- Also called: See list of synonyms
- Origin: Cariñena, Aragon
- Notable regions: Languedoc, Sardinia, Algeria and Catalonia
- Notable wines: Historically Cariñena and Rioja but little used now
- Hazards: Rot, powdery mildew, downy mildew and grape worms. Late budding and ripening
- VIVC number: 2098

Carignan (French pronunciation: [kaʁiɲɑ̃] ka-ri-NYAN; also known as Mazuelo, Bovale Grande, Cariñena, Carinyena, Samsó, Carignane, and Carignano) is a red grape variety of Spanish origin that is more commonly found in French wine but is widely planted throughout the western Mediterranean and around the globe. Along with Aramon, it was considered one of the main grapes responsible for France's wine lake and was a substantial producer in jug wine production in California's Central Valley but in recent years, it has been reborn as a flagship wine for many cellars in the south of France as well as in Catalonia.

Ampelographers believe that the grape likely originated in Cariñena, Aragon and was later transplanted to Sardinia, elsewhere in Italy, France, Algeria, and much of the New World. The variety was historically a component of Rioja's red wine blend. The grape's prominence in France hit a high point in 1988 when it accounted for 167,000 hectares (410,000 acres) and was France's most widely planted grape variety. That year, in a drive to increase the overall quality of European wine and to reduce the growing wine lake phenomenon, the European Union started an aggressive vine pull scheme where vineyard owners were offered cash subsidies in exchange for pulling up their vines. Out of all the French wine varieties, Carignan was the most widely affected dropping by 2000 to 95,700 ha (236,000 acres) and being surpassed by Merlot as the most widely planted grape.

The popularity of Carignan was largely tied to its ability to produce very large yields in the range of 200 hl/ha (11 tons/acre). The vine faces significant sensitivity to several viticultural hazards including rot, powdery mildew, downy mildew, and grape worms. Carignan is a late budding and ripening grape which requires a warm climate in order to achieve full physiological ripeness. The vine also develops very thick stalk around the grape clusters which makes mechanical harvesting difficult. It has an upright growth habit and can be grown without a trellis.

A white grape mutation known as Carignan blanc and a pink-berried Carignan gris also exists in Roussillon in small plantings of around 411 hectares (1,020 acres) and 1 hectare (2.5 acres), respectively, reported in 2008.

== History ==
In the mid-15th century, the Crown of Aragon stretched from Eastern Spain, across Sardinia and mainland Italy all the way to the eastern Mediterranean. It is during this time that ampelographers believe that Carignan, which likely originated in Aragon, may have been introduced to these lands.

Early Italian wine writers speculated that Carignan, known as Carignano in several parts of Italy, was a Phoenician wine grape variety that was brought to the island of Sardinia by the Phoenicians in the 9th century BC. From there the grape is believed to have spread to other Phoenician colonies, including the settlement at Sulcis, eventually being brought to the Italian mainland and carried around the western Mediterranean basin by the ancient Romans. Today, ampelographers largely discount this theory due to the lack of historical documentation or evidence from DNA analysis suggesting a Phoenician or Italian origin. Instead, the evidence points more strongly to a Spanish origin of the grape.

Ampelographers do believe that Carignan is likely a very old variety due to its widespread plantings and the proliferation of numerous different synonyms that give testament to the grape's long history in different wine regions. The grape likely originated in the Aragon region of northeast Spain where it possibly named after the town of Cariñena in the province of Zaragoza. However, in Zaragoza and other parts of Catalonia, the grape is sometimes called Samsó which is also used as a synonym for the French wine grape Cinsault, adding to confusion over Carignan's history in the region. Another Spanish synonym, Mazuelo, which is used in the Rioja wine region, is believed by ampelographers and wine historians to come from the commune of Mazuela in the province of Burgos in the Castile and León region of northwest Spain.

In 2006, DNA profiling suggested a parent-offspring relationship between Carignan and the Rioja wine grape Graciano though it was not yet clear which variety is the parent and which is the offspring. However, some grape geneticist and ampelographers such as José Vouillamoz dispute the 2006 findings and believe that the DNA profiles of both grapes are too distinct to have a close parent-offspring relationship at all. It is more likely, Vouillamoz and others suggest, that Carignan and Graciano were the result of two separate spontaneous crossings of unknown Vitis vinifera parents that occurred somewhere in northeast Spain.

Carignan was likely introduced to Sardinia sometime between 1323 and 1720 when the island was under the Spanish influence of the Crown of Aragon. Here the grape developed in isolation to form distinct clones under the synonyms Bovale di Spagna and Bovale Grande. At some point the grape reached Algeria where it became a high yielding "workhorse" variety that was widely exported to France to add color and weight to French wine blends. After the phylloxera epidemic devastated French vineyards in the mid to late 19th century, plantings of Carignan grew in popularity on the French mainland. Plantings increased even more when Algeria gained independence in 1962. The grape's prominence in France hit a high point in 1988 when it accounted for 167,000 hectares (410,000 acres) and was France's most widely planted grape variety. However, as France's wine lake problem became more of a concern, authorities within the French government and European Union started an aggressive vine pull scheme where vineyard owners were offered cash subsidies in exchange for pulling up their vines.

== Viticulture ==
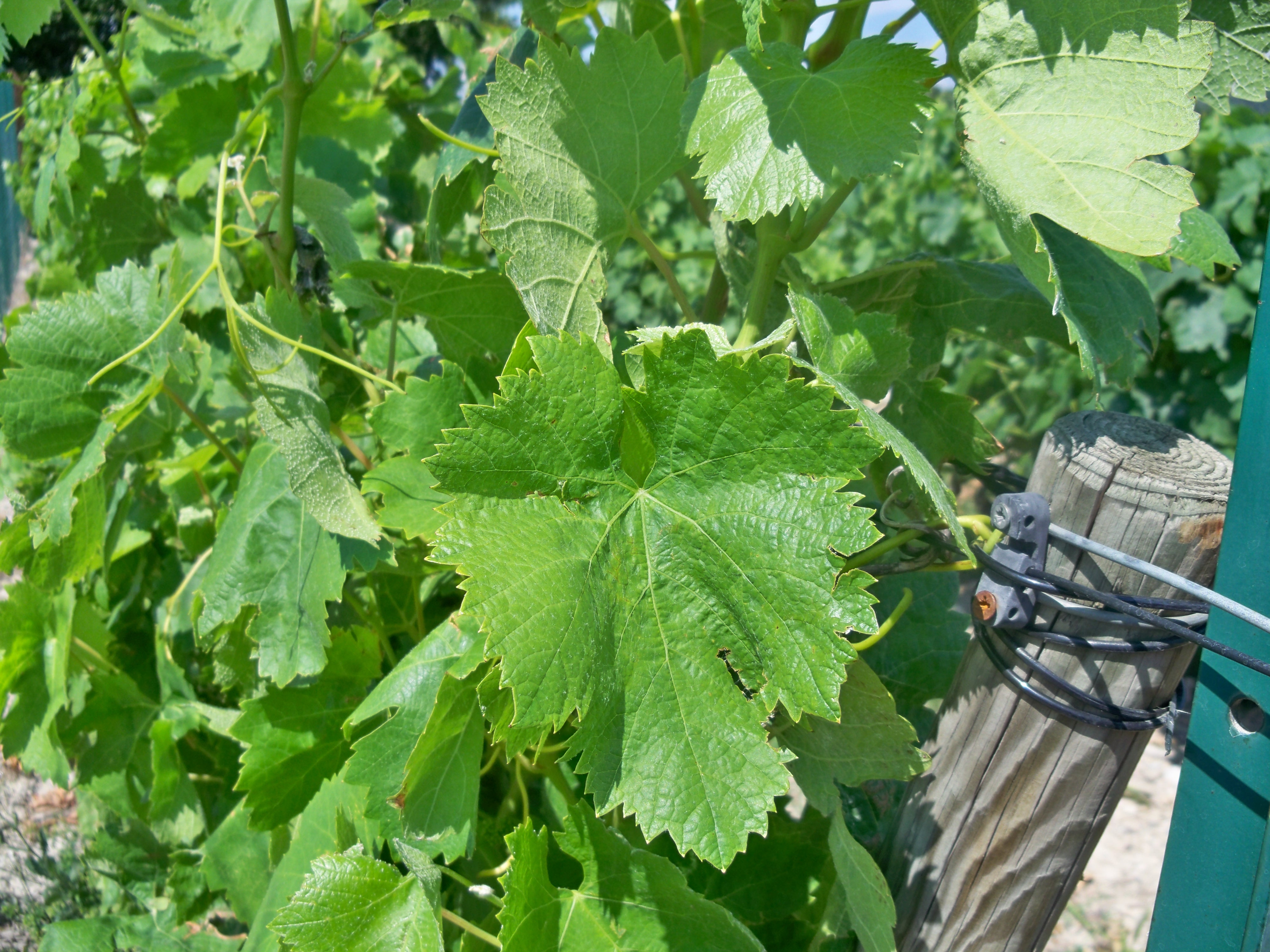
Carignan leaf.

Carignan is a late budding and late ripening variety that is often one of the last grapes to be harvested during a vintage. The vine is very vigorous and high yielding, able to easily produce 200 hectoliters/hectare (approximately 10.4 tons/acres), if not kept in check by winter pruning or green harvesting during the growing season. The late ripening nature of the grape means that it rarely achieves full ripeness unless planted in vineyard soils in very warm climates such as the Mediterranean climates where the grape originated in or the hot Central Valley of California.

Carignan's tendency to produce short shoots with clusters that grow closely to the trunk of the vine means that it is a difficult variety to harvest mechanically. However, the economy of scale for blending varieties or grapes destined for lower priced box and jug wines often do not work well with the expense and labor cost of hand-harvesting. Among the viticultural hazards that Carignan is susceptible to include powdery mildew and infestation of the vine from grape worms and the European Grapevine Moth. The vine has some slight resistance to the fungal disease of botrytis bunch rot, downy mildew, and phomopsis.

=== Relationship and confusion with other grapes ===
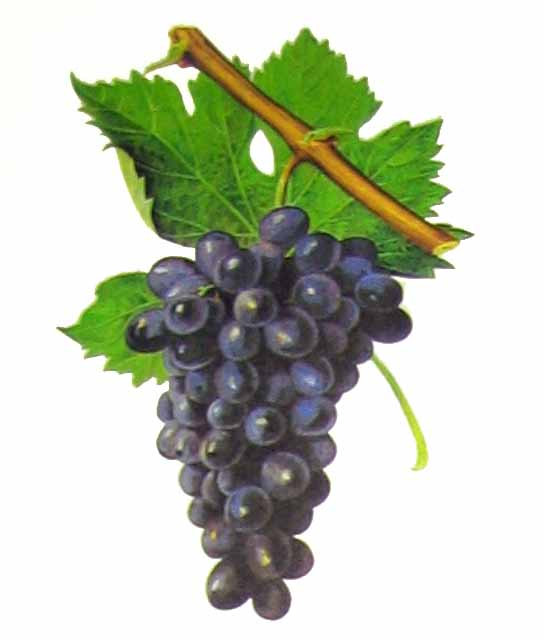
Despite sharing several synonyms, such as Samsó in Catalonia, Carignan and Cinsault (pictured) are genetically distinct.

In 2003, DNA evidence confirmed that Carignan/Cariñena was the same variety as the Mazuelo (or Mazuela) grape of Rioja. This was followed by the discovery in 2007 that the Bovale di Spagna and Bovale Grande grapes of Sardinia were also identical to Carignan. DNA profiling was also able to distinguish Carignan as a distinct variety from other varieties known as Bovale (including Graciano which is known on Sardinia as Bovale Sardo and Bovale Cagnulari) as well as the Valencia wine grape Bobal which is sometimes field blended in the Cariñena (DO) with Carignan.

Other varieties sometimes confused with Carignan but have been conclusively proven by DNA analysis to be distinct include the Sardinian wine grape Nieddera that is related to the Pascale di Cagliari grape which also grown on the island, Cinsault which shares the synonym Samsó in Catalonia with Carignan, the Italian wine grape Tintilia del Molise that is grown in the Lazio and Molise wine regions of central Italy and the Spanish wine grape Parraleta that is grown in the Somontano DO of Aragon.

Grapes that are also unrelated to Carignan but share synonyms include Carignan Boushet (a Petit Bouschet and Morrastel cross), Bobal (a Spanish wine grape that is also known as Carignan d'Espagne), Aubun (a French wine grape that is also known as Carignan de Bedoin, Carignan de Bedouin, and Carignan de Gigondas), Alicante Bouschet (French teinturier grape that is also known as Carignan jaune), and Grenache (which is also known as Carignan rouge, Carignane rosso, and Carignane rousse).

Over the years Carignan has been crossed with several varieties to create new wine grapes including with Cabernet Sauvignon to give Ruby Cabernet and with the Portuguese wine grape Souzão to produce Argaman.

=== Carignan blanc and gris ===
Carignan blanc and Carignan gris can be found to a limited extent in the French wine region of Roussillon along the Spanish border.

Like Pinot noir and Grenache, Carignan has mutated to produce white-berried and pink-berried color mutations known as Carignan blanc and Carignan gris, respectively. Carignan blanc is a white mutation of the Carignan grape found primarily in the Roussillon region. First discovered in the early 20th century, there were 1,652 hectares (4,080 acres) of the grape planted in France in the 1960s but by 2009 that figure had dropped to 411 hectares (1,020 acres). In Spain, Carignan blanc (known as Cariñena blanca throughout most of the country, Samsó blanco in Catalonia, and Carinyena blanc in the Empordà (DO)) is even more rarely found with only 3 hectares (7.4 acres) planted throughout the country in 2008. Here the grape is mostly used for blending with Macabeo, with a very few varietal examples produced.

Like Carignan noir, both Carignan blanc and Carignan gris are late budding and late ripening varieties that are highly susceptible to powdery mildew. According to Master of Wine Jancis Robinson, Carignan blanc tends to produce full-bodied white wines that can have high acid and alcohol levels with very little aromatics. While the wines tend to be "shy" in the nose, Robinson notes that the palate can be "luscious" with light, citrus notes.

== Winemaking ==
In winemaking, the grape is often used as a deep coloring component in blends, rather than being made in a varietal form with some exceptions. Carignan can be a difficult variety for winemakers to work due to its naturally high acidity, tannins, and astringency which requires a lot of skill to produce a wine of finesse and elegance. Some winemakers have experimented with carbonic maceration and adding small amounts of Cinsault and Grenache with some positive results. Syrah and Grenache are considered its best blending partners being capable of yielding a softer wine with rustic fruit and perfume. In California, Ridge Vineyards has found some success with a varietal wine made from Carignan vines that were planted in the 1880s.

== Wine regions ==
Carignan is found around the globe with the vast majority of plantings in France, followed by Spain and Italy where it is a permitted grape variety in several appellation d'origine contrôlée (AOC), denominación de origen (DO) and Denominazione di origine controllata (DOC) regions. Elsewhere in Europe and the Middle East, plantings of the grape can be found in Croatia, Cyprus, Malta, Turkey, and Israel. In Africa, plantings of Carignan are also found in the north African wine-producing countries of Morocco and Tunisia as well as in South Africa.

In the New World, Carignan is planted in several American Viticultural Areas (AVA)s of the United States, particularly in California and Washington State. Elsewhere in North America, plantings of the grape can be found in Mexico. In South America, Carignan is planted in Argentina, Chile, and Uruguay. In recent years, plantings of the grape have slowly increased in China as well as Australia.

=== France ===
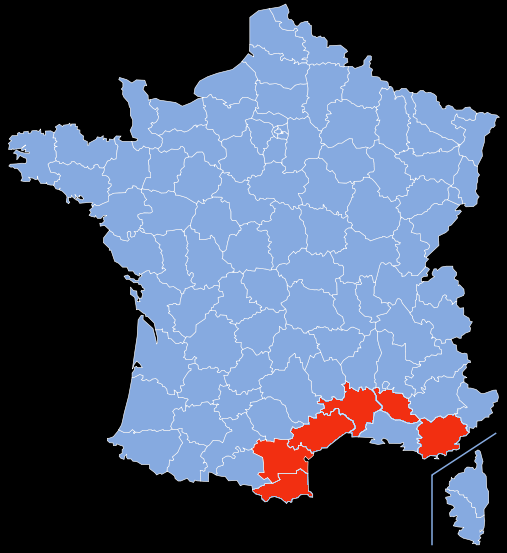
French departments where Carignan is grown.

Carignan is most widely found in southern France, particularly in the Languedoc wine regions of Aude, Gard, and Hérault where it is often made as Vin ordinaire and in some Vin de pays wines. In the late 1990s, there were over 60,000 hectares (150,000 acres) of the grape planted in the Aude and Hérault departments alone but by 2009 the total plantings of Carignan throughout France had dropped to 53,155 hectares (131,350 acres). While plantings of the grape in France were more than 9 times higher than the next major Carignan producing country (Spain), this drop in plantings is indicative of the global trend of decline in "workhorse varieties" like Carignan in favor of what the European Union designates as "improving varieties" such as Grenache, Mourvedre, and Syrah.

Plantings of Carignan are mostly limited to the warm Mediterranean climates of southern France due to the grape's inability to sufficiently ripen much further north in the continental climate of central France or in the damp maritime climate of Southwest France. Other departments with significant plantings of Carignan include the Pyrénées-Orientales, Var, and Vaucluse.

=== Spain ===
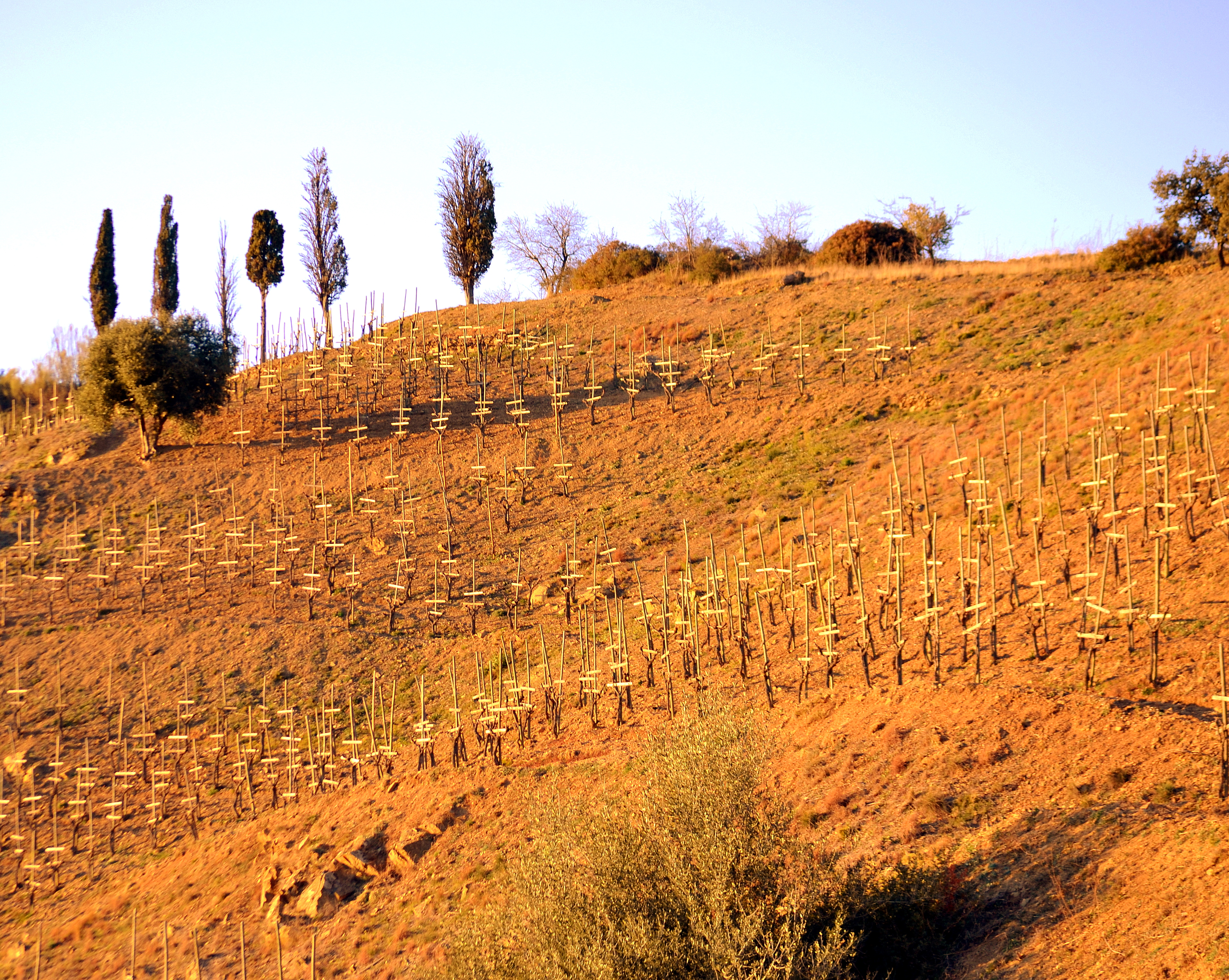
Old bushvine plantings of Carignan can be found in the Priorat region (vineyard pictured) of Catalonia

In 2004, Spain had around 7,000 ha (17,300 acres) of Carignan planted. By 2008 that number has dropped to around 6,130 hectares (15,100 acres), and to 5,644 hectares (13,950 acres) in 2015. The grape (traditionally called Cariñena, but now officially called Mazuelo, but also spelled Mazuela) has seen plantings sharply decline in its ancestral home of Aragon where it was once a secondary component of wine from the denominación de origen protegida (DOP) of Cariñena region after Grenache. In 2009, Aragon has just 926 hectares (2,290 acres) dedicated to the grape.

The grape has found an increasing prominence in the Catalan wine region of Priorat, where it is the main variety in the schistous vineyard soils of the northern half of the appellation. Around the villages of Poboleda and Porrera in the province of Tarragona are bushvines of the grape that are more than 100 years old that are used to make varietal wines. The grape is also found in the DOPs of Costers del Segre, Montsant, Penedès, Tarragona, and Terra Alta. In Catalan the grape is called Samsó or Carinyena, though it is not related to Cinsault which is also known as Samsó in Catalonia.

Outside of Catalonia, Mazuelo is mostly a secondary blending variety used to add acidity to the Tempranillo-based wines of Rioja though a few producers, such as Marqués de Murrieta, do make varietal examples of the grape. In 2008, there were 1,193 hectares (2,950 acres) of the grape in Rioja. In 2009, there were 697 hectares (1,720 acres) and 515 hectares (1,270 acres) of Carignan planted in the nearby wine regions of Castile-La Mancha and Navarra respectively.

=== Other Old World regions ===
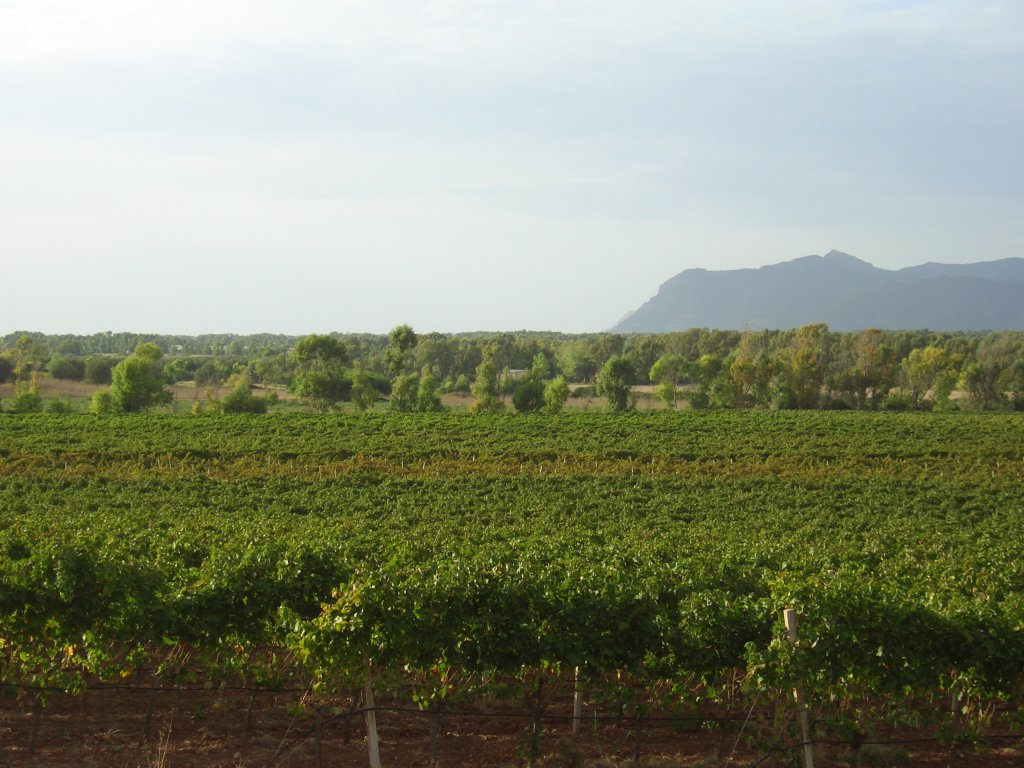
More than 97% of Italian Carignan plantings are found in Sardinia (vineyard pictured) where the grape is also known as Bovale Grande.

In 2012, more than 97% of Italy's 1,748 hectares (4,320 acres) of Carignan plantings were in Sardinia with a few scattered plantings throughout Lazio, particularly the Cerveteri DOC, where it is often used in rosé winemaking. The Carignano del Sulcis Denominazione di origine controllata (DOC) features a Carignan-based rosso from the Sardinian islands of Sant'Antioco and San Pietro. Here the grape is known as Bovale Grande and is also featured in the DOC wines of Campidano di Terralba and Mandrolisai.

The grape is still popular in North Africa in Algeria, Morocco and Tunisia. Carignan also played an important role in the early development of the Israeli wine industry. Though it is not as prominent today, it is still the country's third most widely planted red grape variety after Cabernet Sauvignon and Merlot with 800 hectares (2,000 acres) in 2009. The first serious and consistent efforts to produce quality Carignan was at 2002 by Assaf Paz, the Bordeaux trained Enologist of Vitkin winery. His persistence to produce high quality old vine Carignan encourages other producers to follow and today Israel presents an impressive range of faire to excellent examples of this variety.

Other Old World wine producing countries with significant Carignan plantings include Croatia with 210 hectares (520 acres) in 2009, Cyprus with 366 hectares (900 acres), Malta with 10 hectares (25 acres) and Turkey with 134 hectares (330 acres) in 2010. Chinese winemakers have also experimented with growing Carignan in some of their warmer wine regions.

=== United States ===
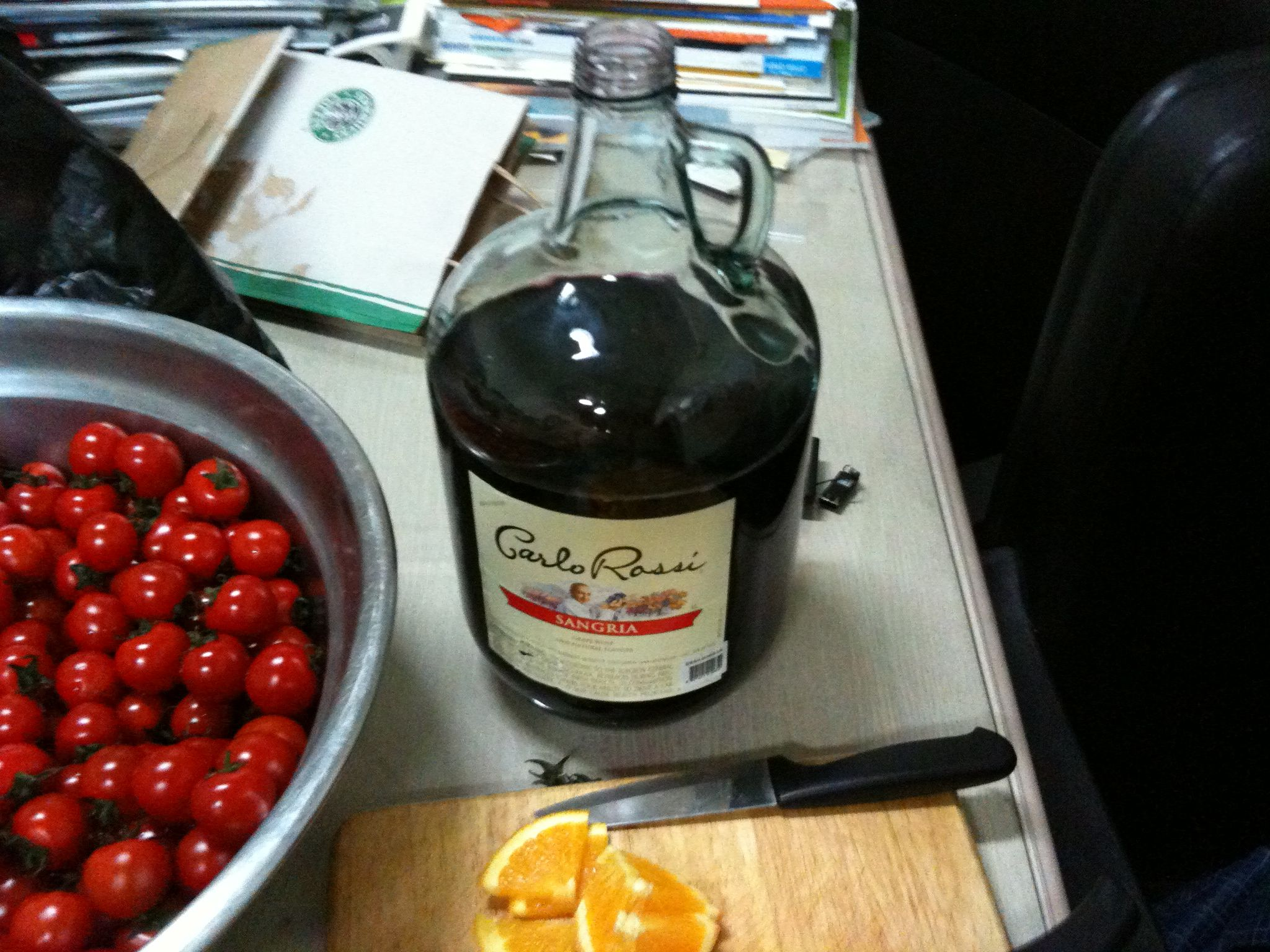
For many years Carignan was the third most widely planted grape in California where it was a major component in the production of many varieties of jug wines.

At one point in California's wine history, Carignane (as it is known there) was the third most widely planted grape variety but has since dropped considerably in production. The majority of the vines were planted in the Central Valley and used to make inexpensive box and jug wines. In the 1970s and 1980s, Californian Carignane was one of the leading "home winemaking" grapes in production. In 2010, there were 1,373 hectares (3,390 acres) of the grape planted in the state with American Viticultural Areas in Contra Costa, Mendocino, and Sonoma counties seeing a slight increase in interest while plantings the Central Valley have declined.

Outside of California, plantings of the grape can be found in Washington State as well as in Missouri and Texas.

=== Other New World regions ===
In Mexico, plantings of Carignan are found in the states of Aguascalientes, Sonora, and Zacatecas. In Chile, old vines of plantings of Carignan are grown without irrigation in the Maule region which accounted for the majority of the country's 675 hectares (1,670 acres) plantings of the grape in 2008. In Argentina there was just 30 hectares (74 acres) of the grape while Uruguay had 486 hectares (1,200 acres) planted in 2009.

In Australia the grape was often confused with the Bonvedro vine, which is similarly prone to diseases, but in recent years Australian winemakers have been able to identify true Carignan. Most Australian plantings of Carignan are found in South Australia where the grape is primarily used for blending. In South Africa, there were 80 hectares (200 acres) of the grape planted in 2012 with the majority found on the shale vineyard soils of the Paardeberg, Malmesbury region in Swartland.

== Synonyms ==
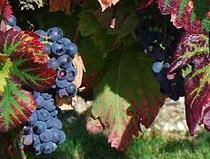
Carignan.

The grape is known under a variety of synonyms through the world. In Spanish it is known as Cariñena (particularly in Aragon), with Cariñano (also in Aragon), Mazuelo, Tinto Mazuelo, Crujillon (in Aragon) and Samsó (in Catalonia) also being used in Spain. The recent use of Samsó has been controversial because this seems to be an error, as there is a different grape called Samsó, which is France's Cinsault but this change was implemented due to name Cariñena (in Catalan the grape is still generally called, 'Carinyena') being claimed by the DO body in Aragon.

In California it is spelled with an extra vowel on the end as Carignane. In Italy it is known as Gragnano while in Sardinia it is known as Bovale Grande and Carignano. In Portugal it is known as Pinot Evara even though it has no relation to the Pinot family of grapes. Other French synonyms include Carignan noir, Bois Dur, Catalan, Roussillonen, Monestel, and Plant de Lédenon.

Other recognized synonyms for Carignan include: Axina de Spagna, Babonenc, Babounenc, Blaue Shopatna, Blaue Sopatna, Blauer Carignan, Blauer Carignant, Boi Dur, Bois de Fer, Bois dure, Bovale Grande di Spagna, Bovale Mannu, Bove Duro, Bove Duro di Spagna, Cafalan Cagnolaro, Cagnolaro tinto, Calignan, Carignan Crni, Carignan Frances, Carignan Mouillan, Carignan noir, Carignane Mouilla, Carignane noir, Carignane noire, Carignane violette, Carignanne, Carignano, Carignano di Carmignano, Carignena, Carinena, Carinena Mazuela, Carinena negra, Cencibel, Crignane, Crinana, Crusillo, Girard, Girarde, Grenache du Bois, Grenache du Bois Dur, Karinjan, Karinyan, Kek Carignan, Legno Duro, Legno Duro di Portoferraio, Manuelo Tinto, Manzuela (in Rioja), Marocain, Mazuela, Mollard (in Rioja), Mounesteou, Pinot d'Evora, Plant d'Espagne, Plant de Ledenon, Pokovec, Pokovez, Samso, Samso Crusillo, Sanso, Soptna blau, Tinto Mazuela, and Uva di Spagna.

Synonyms for the white-berried mutation Carignan blanc include: Feher Carignan and Karinjan.

Synonyms for the pink-berried mutation Carignan gris include: Szuerke Carignan.
