= Garró =

Variety of grape

- Grape (Vitis)
- Color of berry skin: Noir
- Species: Vitis vinifera
- Also called: Mandón and other synonyms
- Origin: Spain
- Pedigree parent 1: Hebén
- Pedigree parent 2: Graciano
- Formation of seeds: Complete
- Sex of flowers: Hermaphrodite
- VIVC number: 7326

Garró is a native Spanish red wine grape variety close to extinction. The word garró means ankle, particularly that of a pig, in Catalan. It has historically been grown in Baix Ebre in Catalonia, as well as in Valencia, and other parts of eastern Spain. The Spanish DOPs of Pla de Bages in Catalonia and Valencia grow it as an authorised variety under the synonym Mandó.

== Synonyms ==
Barillol, Galmeta, Galmete, Mandó, Mandón, Morenillo, Valenciana Tinta
