= Terra Alta (DO) =

Coordinates: 41°3′N 0°26′E

Terra Alta DOP
- Wine region
- Terra Alta DOP in the province of Tarragona in the region of Catalonia
- Official name: D.O.P. Terra Alta
- Type: Denominación de Origen Protegida (DOP)
- Year established: 1972
- Country: Spain
- No. of vineyards: 6,066 hectares (14,989 acres)
- No. of wineries: 62
- Wine produced: 55,586 hectolitres
- Comments: Data for 2016 / 2017

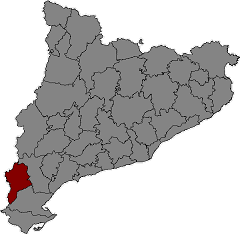
Terra Alta DOP in Catalonia

Terra Alta DOP wine label

Terra Alta is a Spanish Denominación de Origen Protegida (DOP) (Denominació d'Origen Protegida in Catalan) for Catalan wines, located in the west of the province of Tarragona (Catalonia, Spain) and covers 12 inland municipalities. As the name indicates (Terra Alta = High Land) the area is in the mountains. It features in a number of Picasso’s paintings.

Traditionally, due to its geographical isolation, this area only made wine for local consumption and has only recently started to produce modern Mediterranean style wines.

Several cooperative wineries were designed and built in the 1920s by Cèsar Martinell, a student of Antoni Gaudí, and are notable for their modernist architectural style.

== History ==
In the times of the ancient Romans, the road from Zaragoza to Tortosa passed through the area, and is probably when grape growing was first introduced. In the Middle Ages, the Knights Templar planted vines, but the geographical distance to markets and to ports meant that a lot of vineyards were converted to olive groves instead.

There are extant legal documents on the regulation of the grape and wine industry: Las Costums d’Orta dating from 1296 and Las Costums de Miravet from 1319.

During the 19th century the vinos rancios (rancid wines) from Terra Alta, such as “Amber Blanc” attained great fame.

However, the area was devastated by the outbreak of the phylloxera bug. The current vineyards were replanted (by grafting onto New World rootstock) between 1920 and 1950, largely by means of the creations of cooperatives.

Terra Alta DOP acquired official status in 1972 and there are currently around 6,000 ha covered, with 1,242 grape growers and 62 wineries registered.

== Geography ==
The main town in the area is Gandesa. To the east the Terra Alta DO borders on Tarragona (DO), while to the west it borders on the province of Teruel. The mountains reach a height of 950 m above sea level, though the vineyards are lower down on the slopes, valleys and plateaus.

== Climate ==
The climate is mixture of Mediterranean and continental. The summers are long, hot and dry and the winters are very cold. The average annual temperature is 16.5 °C (max 35 °C in summer, min -5 °C in winter). There is a risk of late frosts in spring. Average annual rainfall is about 400 mm. A dry wind, known as el Mestral from the valley of the River Ebro is influential in keeping humidity low and thus protecting the vines from disease.

== Soils ==
The soils are clayey, with a good lime content, poor in organic material, with a significant proportion of sizable elements which allows for good drainage.

== Authorised Grape Varieties ==
The authorised grape varieties are:

- Red: Garnatxa Negra, Garnatxa Peluda, Samsó / Mazuela / Carignan, Ull de llebre, Cabernet Sauvignon, Merlot, Garnatxa Tintorera, Syrah
- White: Garnatxa Blanca, Macabeu, Parellada, Sauvignon Blanc, Moscatel de Grano Menudo, Moscatell d’Alejandria, Chenin blanc, Pedro Ximénez, Chardonnay
