= Valencia (DO) =

Spanish wine producing area

Coordinates: 39°28′00″N 0°22′30″W

Valencia DOP
- Wine region
- Valencia DOP in the Province of Valencia in the Valencian Community
- Official name: D.O.P. Valencia
- Type: Denominación de Origen Protegida (DOP)
- Year established: 1932
- Country: Spain
- Size of planted vineyards: 13,100 hectares (32,371 acres)
- No. of wineries: 106
- Wine produced: 327,842 hectolitres
- Comments: Data for 2016 / 2017

Valencia (Valencian: València) is a Spanish Denominación de Origen (DO), in Valencian: Denominació d'Origen, for wines located in the Province of Valencia within the Valencian Community and is divided into two separate zones and four sub-zones, each of which produces a different type of wine.

== History ==
Grape growing and wine production has been present in this area for thousands of years as attested by several archaeological finds, including Neolithic tombs containing remains of grapes.

The wine from Sagunto was mentioned in texts by Juvenal and Marcial in the 2nd century BC. In the 13th century the valencian citizen Arnau de Vilanova wrote one of the first treatises on Spanish wine.

== Sub-zones ==
=== Valentino ===
The Valentino sub-zone, located to the northwest, is the largest one and its vineyards slope gently upwards from the coastal plain towards the interior of the province. This sub-zone is in turn divided in three geographically distinct areas:

- Cheste and Marquesado at a height of 175 m above sea level with brown and reddish lime bearing soils.
- Campos de Liria at a height of 275 m above sea level, where the soils are similar to the ones at lower altitudes.
- Serranía at a height of 550 m above sea level, with brown lime bearing soils over consolidated subsoils.

=== Alto Turia ===
The Alto Turia sub-zone is located to the west of Valentino at a height of between 700 m and 1,100 m above sea level and is characterised by its sandy soils.

=== Moscatel ===
The Moscatel sub-zone is located at the western boundary of the city of Valencia and the vineyards rise from sea level to an altitude of 100 m.

=== Clariano ===
The Clariano sub-zone is to the south, further away from the other three sub-zones and close to the towns of Xàtiva and Gandia. It is geographically divided into two different areas:

- one area to the east, at a height of 350 m above sea level where the soils are similar to those in Valentino
- another area in the Vall d'Albaida, where the soils have a higher proportion of clay over a brown lime bearing subsoil

== Soils ==
In general, the subsoils vary from fluvial type at low altitudes, to lime bearing at the higher altitudes, and sandy type at the intermediate altitudes. They are generally soils from the Miocene and the Quaternary period, very permeable and therefore do not give rise to drainage problems.

== Climate ==
The coastal vineyards have a Mediterranean climate but the majority which are further inland have a mild continental climate (long, hot dry summers and cold winters). Temperatures can vary up to 30 °C on a daily basis. Maximum temperature in summer can reach over 40 °C and in winter drop to -5 °C.

Some areas are classified as arid or semi-arid, though violent storms are common in summer and autumn. Hailstones fall occasionally and strong winds can sometimes cause damage in the Cheste sub-zone.

Drought has always been a problem for grape growers, though today drip irrigation is permitted by the Regulatory Council of the DOP.

== Grapes ==
Merseguera is the most characteristic white variety in the area, though many different grape varieties are authorised in Valencia DOP:

- Red: Bobal, Bonicaire, Cabernet Sauvignon, Cabernet Franc, Forcallat Tinta, Garnacha, Graciano, Malbec, Mandó, Marselán, Mencía, Merlot, Monastrell, Mazuelo, Petit Verdot, Pinot Noir, Syrah, Tempranillo, Garnacha Tintorera.
- White: Chardonnay, Gewürztraminer, Macabeo, Malvasía, Merseguera, Moscatel de Alejandría, Moscatel de Grano Menudo, Planta Fina de Pedralba, Planta Nova, Pedro Ximénez, Riesling, Sauvignon Blanc, Semillón Blanc, Tortosí, Verdejo, Verdil, Viognier.

Two different types of vineyards are present in the DOP depending on the climate. In the hot areas, the vines are planted as low bushes (en vaso) at a distance of 2.5 m from each other, as they are better protected from the heat if they are closer to the ground. In milder climates the vines tend to be planted on trellises (en espaldera).

The most common rootstock is the 41-B clone due to its high resistance to drought.

Vine planting density is low and ranges from a minimum of 1,600 vines/ha to 2,500 vines/ha.

== Wines ==
Apart from the conventional wines made in a similar way to other wine producing regions, Valencia DOP has two unusual characteristics:

- In 1995 an agreement was signed to legalise a traditional practice which consisted in blending in the Bobal red grape variety from the neighbouring Utiel-Requena DOP to give body and aroma to the Valencian wines.
- The aging times for wines in the Valencia DOP are shorter than in other Spanish wine producing regions due to the climatic conditions where the extreme daily temperature variations accelerate the ageing process. Thus crianza wines only have to remain in oak for a minimum of three months, Reserva for six months and Gran Reserva for nine months.
