= Raimat =

Municipality of Lleida (Catalonia, Spain)

Coordinates: 41°40′42″N 0°28′45″E

Raimat (older spelling Raïmat) is a locality in the municipality of Lleida (Catalonia, Spain), 14 km away from the main town. Along with Sucs, its official status is that of a decentralised municipal entity, as some semi-urban wards attached to a larger municipality are known in Catalonia. It had 489 inhabitants in the 2008 census. It is well known for its wine industry.

== History ==
After the Reapers' War Raimat remained an uninhabited place, with only the ruins of a medieval castle of Arabic origin standing, until in 1914 the landowner Manuel Raventós acquired 3,200 hectares (7,900 acres) in the area, including the castle, and turned them into what nowadays is still the biggest vine culture in the hands of a single owner in the whole of Europe. The winery's name is also Raimat. In 1983 the Raimat-produced wine was granted a Denominación de Origen, or Protected Geographical Status, under the name Costers del Segre.
