= Sucs =

Human settlement in Lleida, Segrià, Ponent, Spain

Coordinates: 41°42′07″N 0°24′42″E

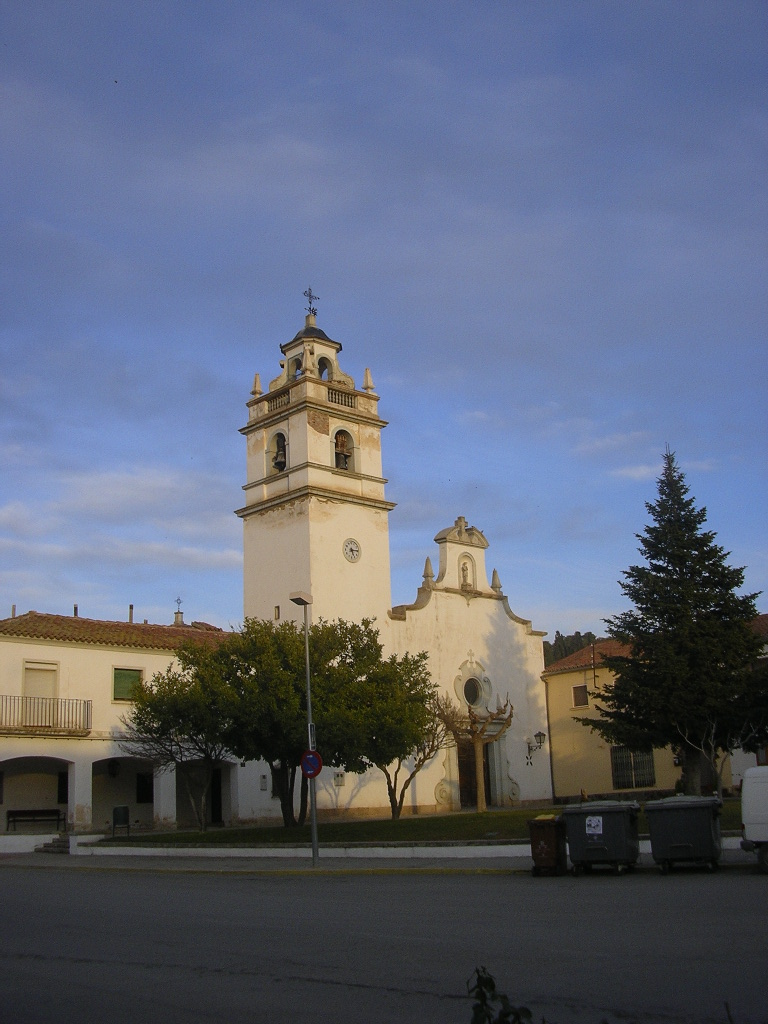
Church at Sucs.

Sucs (Catalan pronunciation: [ˈsuks] previous spelling Suchs, still prevalent in Spanish, but controversial and not official) is a locality in the municipality of Lleida (Catalonia, Spain). Like the neighbouring Raimat, the official status of Sucs is that of a decentralised municipal entity, as some semi-urban wards attached to a larger municipality are known in Catalonia, and located 22 km from Lleida. In the 2008 census Sucs had 578 inhabitants. Its name comes from Arabic, and is a reference to the local fair. It's mentioned in 1188, in the Ordinato Ecclesia Ilerdensis, as part of the bishopric of Lleida, along with the neighbouring locality of Suquets.

The ruins of Sucs castle and a Romanesque church dating back from the 12th century are located on top of a hill known as Lo Vilot.
