= Sumoll Blanc =

Grape variety

- Grape (Vitis)
- Color of berry skin: White
- Species: Vitis vinifera
- Also called: See list of synonyms
- Origin: Spain
- Notable regions: Tarragona, Catalonia
- VIVC number: 12073

Sumoll Blanc is a white grape variety, native to Tarragona in Catalonia, Spain. Although it shares its name with the red grape variety Sumoll, it is genetically unrelated.

== Synonyms ==
Spanish synonyms include Sumoi Blanc and Sumoll Blanco.

== Viticulture ==
It is an authorised grape variety in the Spanish Denominación de Origen Protegida (DOP) (Denominació d'Origen Protegida in Catalan) of Catalunya DOP, Conca de Barberà DOP, and Tarragona. Added to Penedes DO.
