= Tintilia =

Italian wine grape variety

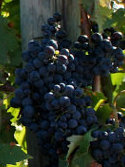
Tintilia grape growing in the Molise region of east-southern Italy.

Tintilia is a red Italian wine grape variety that is grown in the Molise region of east-central Italy. A red wine made from the grape was classified as Denominazione di origine controllata (DOC) in 2011.

== History ==
Its name probably comes from Italian "tinta", which means "dye".

== Wine region ==
The area of production of the grapes for the production of wines with D.O.C. “Tintilia del Molise”, include lands suited to quality and suitable for the cultivation of grapevines in the provinces of Campobasso and Isernia.

== DOC requirements ==
The D.O.C. “Tintilia del Molise” is reserved for those wines meeting the conditions and requirements established by this production regulations for the following types:

- Red
- Red Reserve
- Rosé

Wines with D.O.C. “Tintilia del Molise” must be produced from grapes grown in vineyards consisting, in the farm area, of at least 95% Tintilia vines. To produce these wines can also be used other non-aromatic grapes suitable for cultivation in the provinces of Campobasso and Isernia, existing in the farm vineyards, alone or in combination, up to a maximum of 5%.

== Organoleptic requirements ==
The D.O.C. “Tintilia del Molise” wines, when entering the market, must match the following characteristics:

“Tintilia del Molise” Red wine:

- Colour: deep ruby red, with purple shades;
- Smell: winey, intense, pleasant, peculiar;
- Taste: dry, harmonious, soft, peculiar;
- Minimum total alcoholic strength by volume: 11,50% vol.;
- Minimum total acidity: 4,50 g/L;
- Minimum sugar-free extract: 21,00 g/L.

“Tintilia del Molise” Rosé wine:

- Colour: more or less deep pinkish;
- Smell: lightly fruity;
- Taste: asciutto, fresco, armonico, fruttato;
- Minimum total alcoholic strength by volume: 11,50% vol.;
- Minimum total acidity: 4,50 g/L;
- Minimum sugar-free extract: 18,00 g/L;
- Residual sugar: massimo 10 g/L.

“Tintilia del Molise” Red Reserve wine:

- Colour: garnet red with orange shades;
- Smell: spicy, intense, peculiar;
- Taste: dry, harmonious, soft, peculiar;
- Minimum total alcoholic strength by volume: 13,00% vol.;
- Minimum total acidity: 4,50 g/L.;
- Minimum sugar-free extract: 23,00 g/L.
