= Sumoll =

Grape variety

- Grape (Vitis)
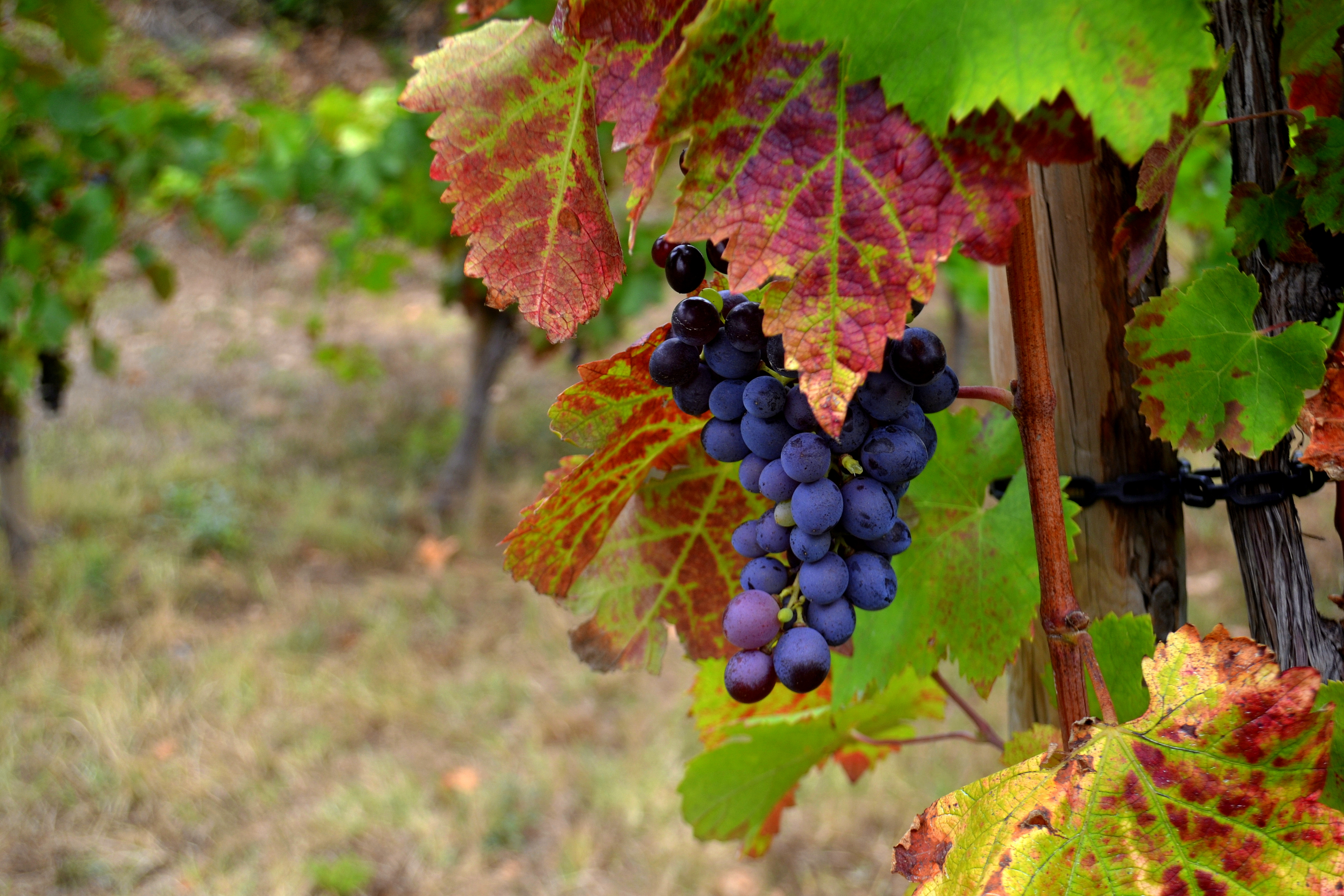
- Color of berry skin: Black
- Also called: Rabo de ovella, Sumoi, Sunier, Sumoll negro, Sumoll tinto, Vijariego negra, Verijariego negra, Vijariego Negro
- Notable regions: Penedès
- VIVC number: 12072

The Sumoll is a black grape variety. It is a rustic variety, native from the Penedès region in Catalonia (EU), drought resistant and with uniform development. The grape is long and big. It is used to produce red, white, rosé wines and Cava. Its former presence is also evident in the number of different names in Catalan dialects: sumoi, chimoi, saumoll, somoi, sumoy, ximoll, somoll, ximoy, xemoll, among others.

The name is related to the local slang term sumollar, which means maturing or withering, from the Latin verb submolliare. Young wine from Sumoll grape has a slight roughness that disappears with aging. Its production is low and treatment for achieving quality wines requires high skills in wine production. Before and after phylloxera, the Sumoll was a variety of black grape widely grown throughout Catalonia. The entrance to the European Union in 1986 accelerated discredit of local varieties, which were not considered able to make good & competitive wines. It has been replaced by other varieties and nowadays its culture is rare, with less than one hundred hectares planted (247 acres). This trend has begun to change within the last years. Wine growers are starting to recover and appreciate this variety, as they see an opportunity to create original wines that differentiate themselves by creating their own specialties, gaining a distance from the big industrial companies using only the stocks of international ubiquitous fashionable types - Cabernet Sauvignon, Merlot or Chardonnay.

The Sumoll is one of the varieties referred by the following DOs (regional certificate of origin authorities), Catalunya, Pla de Bages, Tarragona. In Australia four crossings have been created from Cabernet Sauvignon and Sumoll: Cienna, Vermillion, Rubienne, and Tyrian. The purpose of this crossing is to adapt Sumoll qualities to suit the Australian climate.

Using the synonym Vijariego Negro, to which it has been shown to be genetically identical, it is an authorised variety in a number of the Canary Islands DOPs, and the Spanish mainland Pla de Bages DOP.

Sumoll Blanc is a white variety that is genetically unrelated.

== Bibliography ==
- La varietat sumoll, Institució Catalana d'Estudis Agraris, 2012, 76 pages, downloadable.
- Què diuen del sumoll. Anthology of texts by several writers on sumoll.
