= Alarije =

Variety of grape

- Grape (Vitis)
- Color of berry skin: Blanc
- Species: Vitis vinifera
- Also called: Alarije Dorada, Barcelonés (more)
- Origin: Spain
- Notable regions: Extremadura
- VIVC number: 213

Alarije is a minor variety of white wine grape from Spain. It is most often used in blends.

== History ==
Alarije is thought to originate in Spain. DNA analysis had shown that it was part of the Malvasia family, but more recent DNA analysis suggests that it is genetically distinct from Malvasia.

== Distribution and Wines ==
=== Spain ===
Alarije is quite common in Extremadura, particularly in the Cañamero district. It is one of the varieties authorised for the Ribera del Guadiana Denominación de Origen Protegida (DOP).

== Vine and Viticulture ==
To thrive in Extremadura, it must be tolerant of heat and drought.

== Synonyms ==
Alarije is also known under the synonyms Aceria, Alarije Dorado, Alarije Verdoso, Arin, Aris, Barcelonés, Malvasía de Rioja, Malvasía Riojana, Rojal, Subirat, Subirat Parent, Villanueva, and Villanueva de La Serena.
