= Penedès =

Natural and historical region of the autonomous community of Catalonia, Spain

Coordinates: 41°17′35.82″N 1°44′58.46″E

Penedès region (in blue) and Penedès DOP (in blue and green) within Catalonia.

Penedès (Catalan pronunciation: [pənəˈðɛs]) is a natural and historical region of Catalonia. It is located in the south of the autonomous community of Catalonia, Spain between the pre-coastal mountain range (Serralada Pre-litoral) and the Mediterranean Sea. The comarcal division of the Generalitat de Catalunya in 1936 and 1987, divided Penedès into three administrative comarques: Alt Penedès, Baix Penedès and Garraf, and their capitals are Vilafranca del Penedès, el Vendrell and Vilanova i la Geltrú.

From the historical point of view, Penedès was since the start of the ninth century a border region inside the county of Barcelona, which had its center in the former military town Olèrdola, fortified again because of the Christian advance in 929. Olèrdola lost its defensive significance and the capital in the second half of the twelfth century and then Vilafranca del Penedès became the capital. During the thirteenth century formed the Vegueria of Vilafranca including all Penedès and most of Anoia as the sots-vegueria of Igualada.

The provincial division of 1833 divided the region between the provinces of Barcelona, which includes Alt Penedès and Garraf, and the province of Tarragona, which includes Baix Penedès.

== Wine production ==
Penedès is a wine-producing region having a Spanish Denominación de Origen Protegida (DOP) (Denominació d'Origen Protegida in Catalan). Penedès DOP includes all Penedès region and municipalities of four other comarques: Anoia, Alt Camp, Baix Llobregat and Tarragonès. The area is framed by the coastal hills of the Serra del Garraf and the higher inland mountains which skirt the Catalan Central Depression. Long considered one of the country's best wine-producing regions after the Rioja, it is also one of the most ancient viticultural areas in Europe. Perhaps better-known for its Cava production, a sparkling wine which has had its own Denominació d'Origen since 1986, white grape varieties predominate, although the region also produces some highly regarded, oak-aged reds.

== See also ==
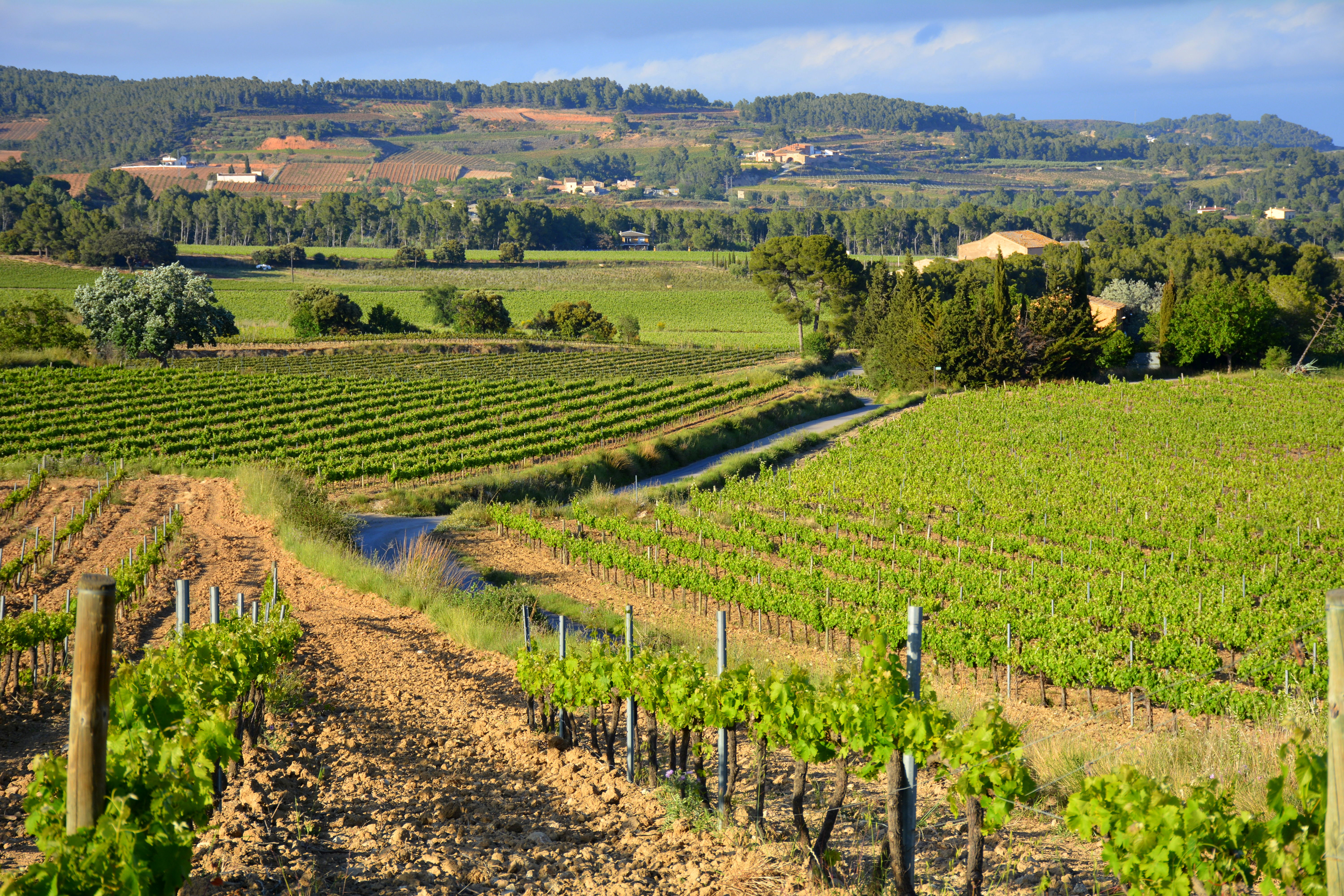
Vineyards in Alt Penedès

- Alt Penedès
- Baix Penedès
- Garraf
