= Catalan wine =

Wine produced in Catalonia

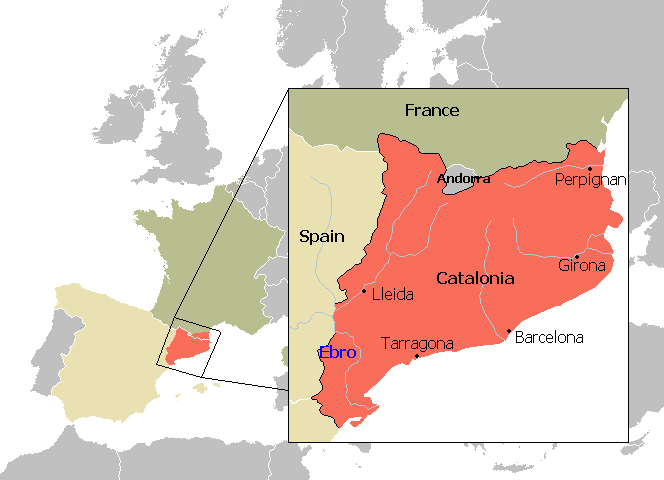
Catalonia, including the Rousillon

Catalan wines are those that are produced in the wine regions of Catalonia. Occasionally, the appellation is applied to some French wine made in the Catalan region of Roussillon and neighboring areas, also known as Northern Catalonia or the Pays catalan. The city of Barcelona is the capital of Catalonia and despite not being in a wine region (although a portion of the Penedès is in the greater comarca of Barcelona), it is the focal point of the Catalan wine industry: a primary consumer market, its port provides export functions and a source of financial resources and investment. The Penedès is the largest wine-making region in Catalonia.

The area has a long winemaking tradition and was the birthplace of the sparkling wine Cava, invented in the early 1870s in Sant Sadurní d'Anoia by Josep Raventós of Codorniu Winery. At the turn of the 20th century, the Catalan wine industry was at the forefront of Spain's emergence as a world leader in quality wine production, being the first Spanish wine region to adopt the use of stainless steel fermentation tanks. The area is also an important cork production region, with output aimed primarily at the region's Cava houses. Today Catalonia is the second-largest producer of wine in Spain, producing over 5.5 million hectolitres.

== History ==
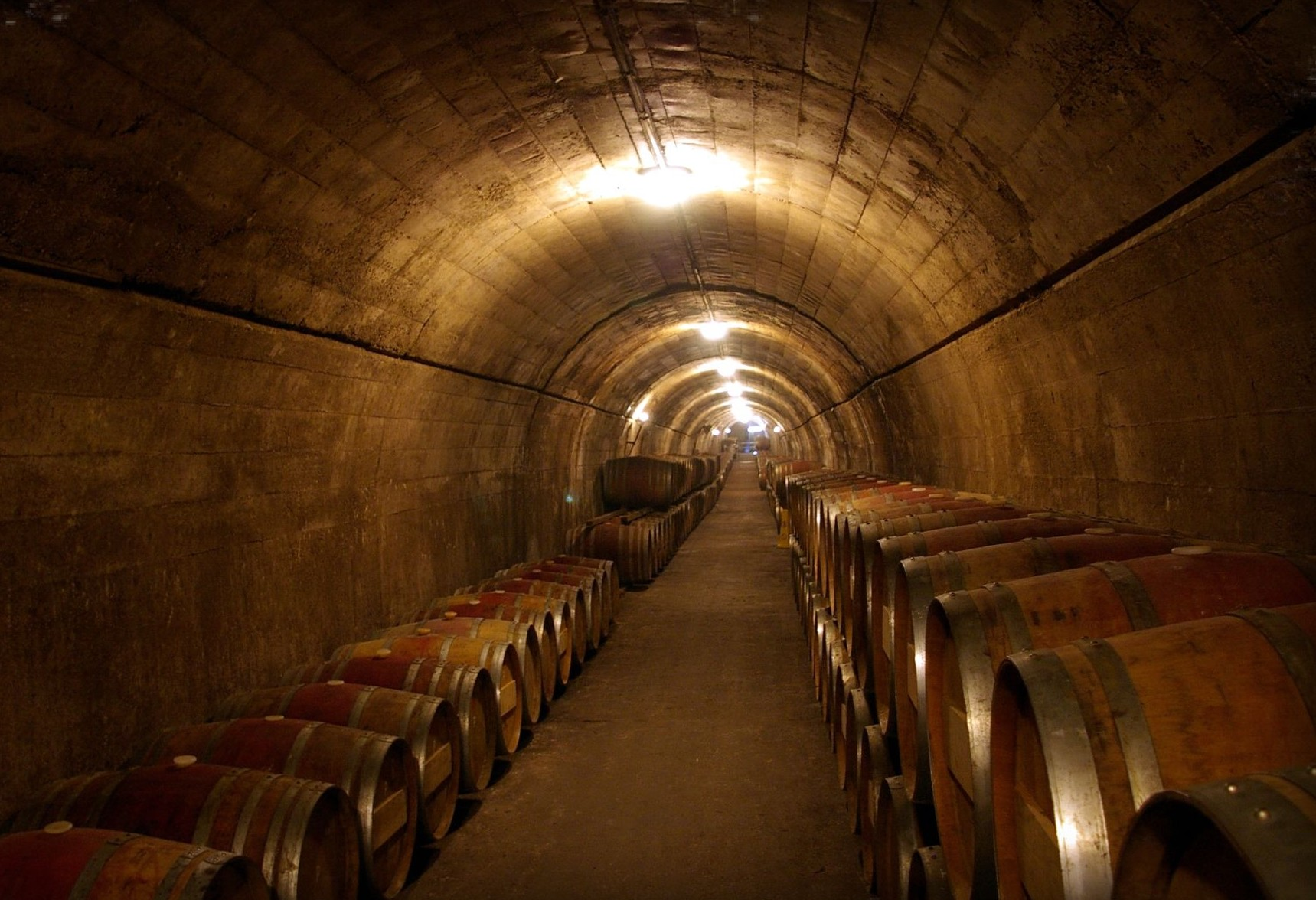
Wine cellars of Catalan winery Torres.

Archaeological evidence suggests that the Phoenicians introduced winemaking to the region several hundred years before the Romans arrived there. Recovered pieces of amphora indicate that the Phoenicians traded ancient Catalan wines with the Egyptians. The Romans had a major influence in the development of Catalan wine-growing, particularly around Tarragona, the Roman capital of occupied Spain. With the fall of the Roman Empire in the 4th century and subsequent Moorish rule, Catalan wine production was severely curtailed. It was several hundred years before wine production began again in earnest.

In the 14th century, the Franciscan writer Francesc Eiximenis described Catalan wines as strong, dense, highly alcoholic wines which, although high quality, sometimes needed to be diluted with water. A turning point for the Catalan wine industry occurred in the 19th century with the outbreak of the phylloxera epidemic that ravaged the French vineyards to the north. Along with wines from the Rioja region, Catalan wines became a welcome import for French consumers suffering a severe shortage of domestic produce.

In 1872, the sparkling wine Cava was invented in the Penedès region and eventually became an internationally recognized wine style. When phylloxera hit the region towards the end of the 19th century, Catalonia's vineyards comprised over 80% red wine grapes. The growing Cava industry encouraged planting of more white wine grapes, in place of the diseased red rootstock, where they now make up nearly 70% of the region's vineyards.

During the 20th century, the Catalan wine industry became one of the leaders of the innovation behind the Spanish wine revolution, embracing modern winemaking techniques and increasing the plantings of international grape varieties. The region received international attention in 1979 when a bottle of Torres 1970 Gran Coronas Black Label (a blend of Cabernet Sauvignon, Tempranillo and Monastrell) was secretly entered into the "classified Bordeaux wine" category of the Gault Millau Wine Olympics and ended up winning that category.

== Climate and geography ==
The Catalan wine region is located along the Mediterranean coast in northeastern Spain and is strongly influenced by its Mediterranean climate. Along the coast temperatures are warm with moderate rainfall but conditions become progressively more arid further inland. The majority of Catalan denominaciones lie to the south of the distinctive peaks of the Montserrat Massif, while smaller plantations lie to the north of Barcelona and south of the French border at the Pyrenees. The region is marked by warm climates along the coast and cooler temperatures through the foothills up to plateaus of more than 2,000 ft (610 m) above sea level. The area has a diversity of soil types, mostly calcareous sediments mixed with alluvium and clay. Some of the most acclaimed vineyards in the region are found on some of the scattered limestone deposits in the area.

== Grapes and wine ==
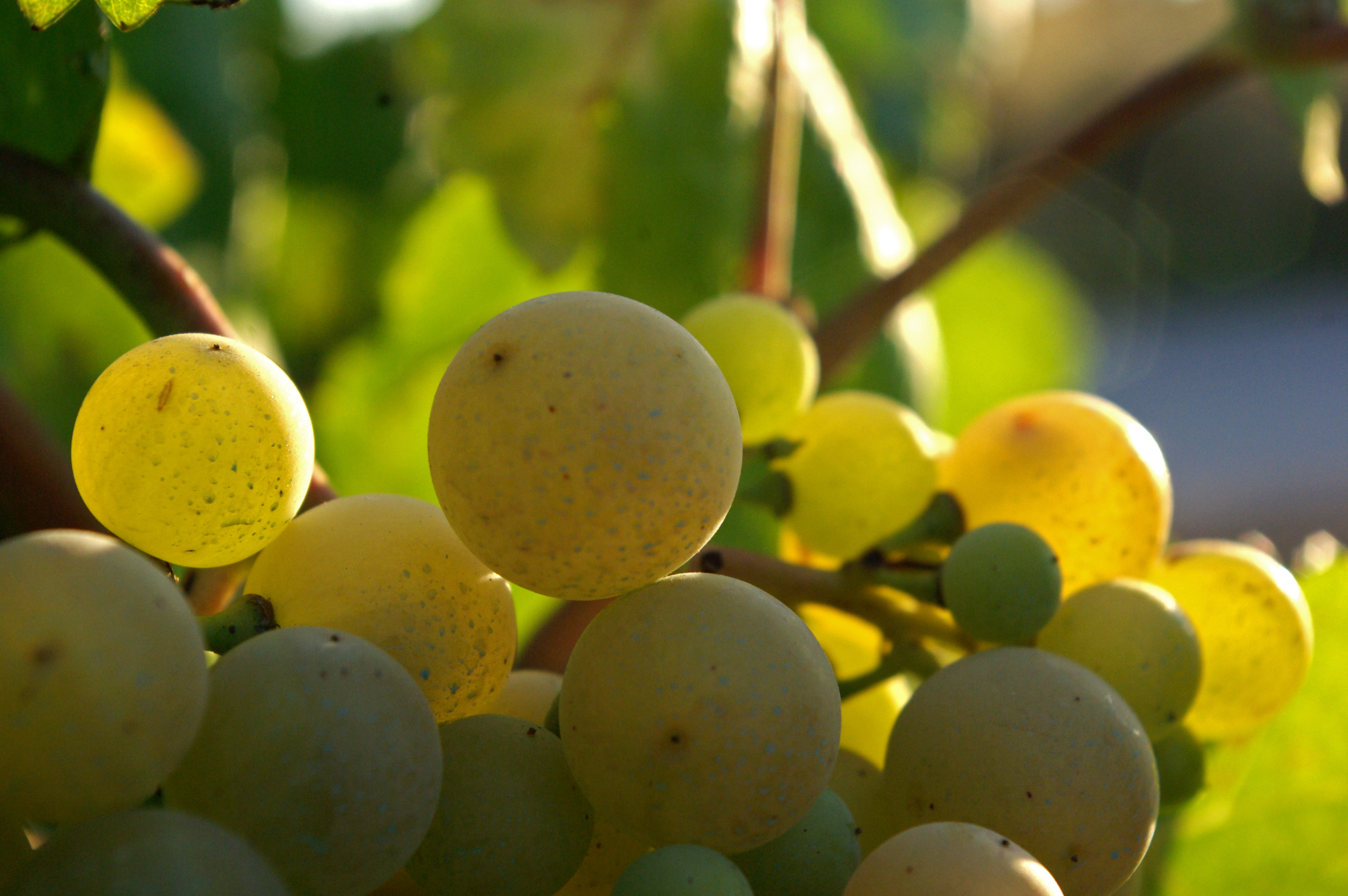
Xarel·lo grapes

The wines of the Catalan wine region include sparkling Cava, dry white wines and powerful reds, known as "black" wine or vi negre in Catalan, due to the colour of the grape. The grapes of the region include the Cava and white wine grapes of Macabeo, Parellada and Xarel·lo and the red wine grapes of Garnacha, Monastrell and Tempranillo called Ull de Llebre in Catalan. The production of sparkling white wine is the largest contributor to the Catalan wine industry, followed by production of still red wines and then still whites. While the majority of the region's wines are the Cava blends, many varietal wines are also produced.

=== Cava ===
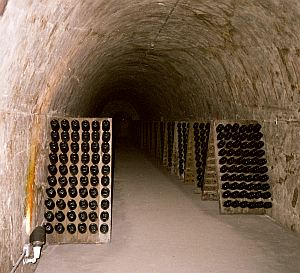
Cava aging.

A Spanish sparkling wine was first made as early as 1851, although the roots of the Cava wine industry can be traced back to Josep Raventos' travels through Europe in the 1860s, where he was promoting the still wines of his Codorníu winery. His visits to the Champagne region sparked an interest in the potential of a Spanish version, using the same sparkling wine production methods.

The local Macabeu, Parellada and Xarel·lo have since become established as the most popular grapes for producing cava. Early versions were called Catalan champán or xampany after Champagne but this practice ended when the EU awarded Champagne Protected Geographical Status. Catalan main sparkling wine producers agreed and adopted the name Cava after the Catalan word for cellar, where the wines were traditionally stored.

According to Spanish wine laws, Cava can be produced in six wine regions (such as Aranda de Duero, Navarra and Rioja) but 95% of Spanish Cava production takes place in the Penedès region. In order for the wines to be called 'Cava', they must be made in the traditional méthode champenoise. Wines made via the low-cost Charmat process may only be called 'Spanish sparkling wine'. A rosé style of Cava is also produced in small quantities by adding still red wines from Cabernet Sauvignon, Garnacha or Monastrell to the wine. The first Cava to use the Chardonnay grape was produced in 1981. Catalan Cava producers pioneered a significant technological development in sparkling wine production with the invention of the gyropallet, a large mechanized device that replaced hand riddling, in which the lees are consolidated in the neck of the bottle prior to disgorgement and corking.

== Wine regions ==
Catalonia's wine regions

The Catalan wine region includes 10 DOPs (Denominación de Origen Protegida in Spanish, Denominació d'Origen Protegida in Catalan) of which one, the Priorat, is a Denominació d'Origen Qualificada (DOQ) region. The Catalunya DOP is an umbrella appellation that covers the entire region for wines that do not fall under any other DOP designation.

=== Alella ===
The Alella DOP is located near the city of Barcelona and was awarded DOP status in 1956. The area is known mainly for its white wine production which can range from oak aged sweet wine to cool fermented dry wines. The principal grape of the area is the Pansa blanca, a local name for the Xarel·lo grape. There are some plantings of the international varieties Chardonnay and Chenin blanc, used in both still wine and Cava production.

=== Conca de Barberà ===
The Conca de Barberà DOP is located between the Costers del Segre, Penedès and Tarragona DOPs with vineyards at elevations of around 1,600 ft (490 m) above sea level. The climate of the region is marked by hot summer days, cool nights chilled by the nearby ocean breeze, and cold winters. The limestone based soils are planted with Cabernet Sauvignon, Chardonnay and Pinot noir, which are used to make still wines as well as contribute to some Cava production. Rosé wines are produced from the local Trepat grape.

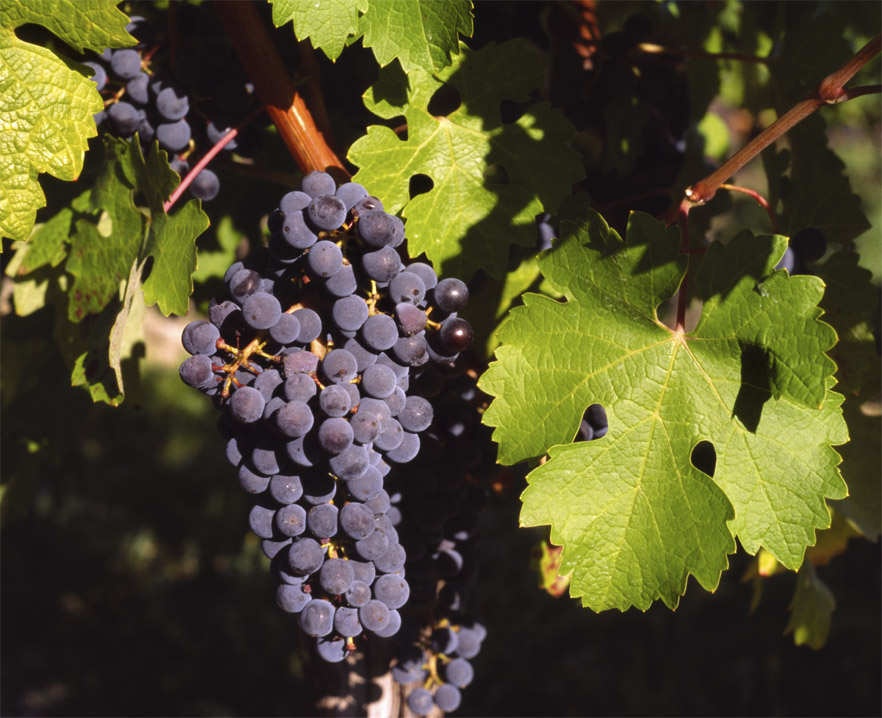
Cabernet Sauvignon

=== Costers del Segre ===
The Costers del Segre DOP is located near the city of Lleida along the Segre River. The landscape here is very arid with less than 15 inches (381.00 mm) of rainfall a year. There are extreme temperature variations throughout the year, with freezing cold winters and summertime highs in excess of 95 °F (35 °C). The river Ebre provides the irrigation vital to the viticulture of the area, which includes Cabernet Sauvignon, Chardonnay, Macabeo, Merlot, Parellada, Pinot noir and Tempranillo plantations.

=== Empordà ===
The Empordà DOP is located in the far north-east of Catalonia, among the foothills of the Pyrenees which border the French province of Roussillon. The area has a similar Mediterranean climate to other Catalan wine regions, but is more heavily influenced by the strong northern winds of the Tramuntana that moderate the risk of frost and vine diseases.

The wind alone was not enough to prevent the outbreak of the phylloxera epidemic in the mid 19th century, which nearly destroyed the entire Empordà wine industry despite many individuals watching and analyzing the progress of the disease as it made its way south from France. Many vineyards were only replanted as recently as the latter half of the 20th century and even early 21st.

The principal grapes of the region are Grenache and Carignan. These two core grapes along with general varieties such as Cabernet Sauvignon, Merlot, and Syrah are used for red wines and the large quantity of rosé wines. The Grenache is also used to make a very notable dessert wine. White production has increased a great deal in recent years as well.

The Empordà wine route consists of 32 wineries and passes by the main vineyards in the region. It resembles the local traditions of combining food and landscape, wine and adventure, heritage and oenology. Numerous unique experiences, such as staged excursions to wineries and vineyards, tastings by the sea, or the opportunity to see firsthand the harvest and traditional winemaking processes, also include the wine tourism package. Not to mention the oenological centers and museums, which are full of creative ways to approach wine culture.

=== Montsant ===
The Montsant DOP was formed in 2001 in the area around Falset, Tarragona to distinguish itself from the wines of the greater Tarragona DO. This upland area is noted for its old Garnacha and Cariñena vines along steeply sloping vineyards.

=== Penedès ===
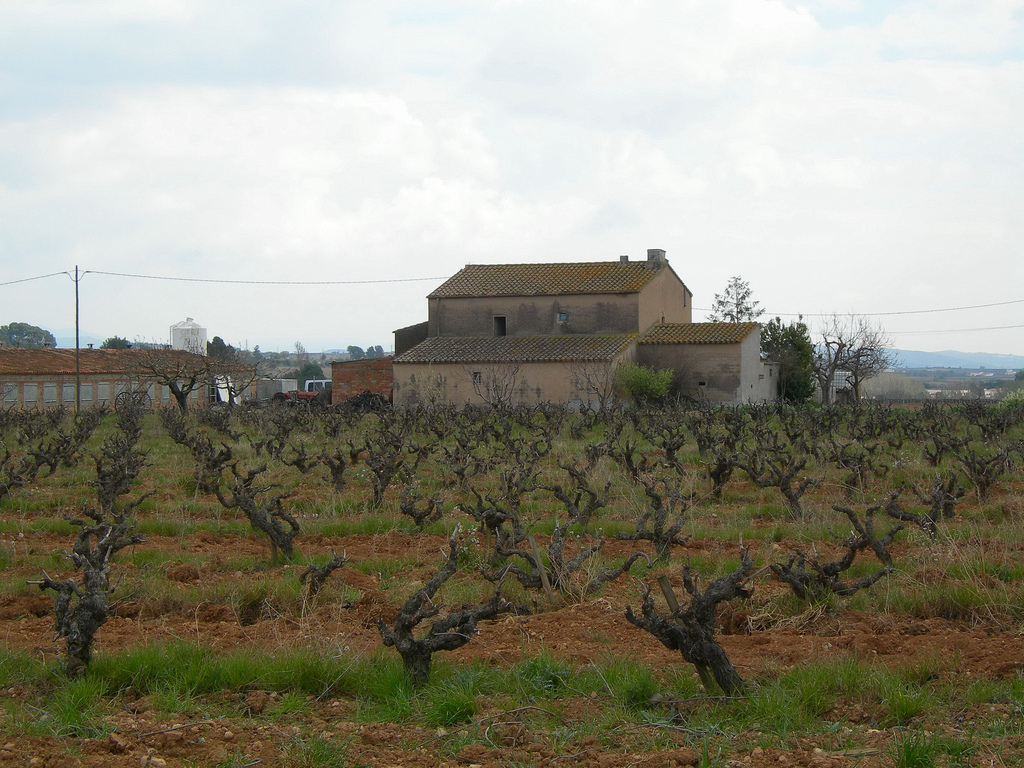
Cava wines growing in the Penedès region.

The Penedès DOP is the largest and most productive wine region of Catalonia and is considered the birthplace of Cava. The region has a long winemaking history and its proximity to Barcelona has had a strong export market. In the 19th century it was one of the first Spanish wine regions to implement a large-scale commercial wine production particularly for export to post-phylloxera France. In the 1960s and 1970s, the Penedès region led in the Spanish wine industry's technological revolution; it was the first wine region to adopt the use of temperature-controlled stainless steel fermentation tanks. The region also began to increase its varieties and improve its vine stock with clonal vine selections of grapes such as Cabernet Sauvignon, Chardonnay, Gewürztraminer, Merlot, Pinot noir, Riesling and Sauvignon blanc.

The region is divided into three zones – the lowland Baix Penedès, the Penedès central which lies between coastal and inland mountain ranges, and the upland Alt Penedès. The warmer Baix Penedès, centered on the town of El Vendrell and extending to the Costa Daurada coastline, has long been known for its fortified wines made from Malvasia and Moscatell d'Alexandria (Muscat of Alexandria), but has a growing reputation for non-fortified reds made from Carinyena, Garnatxa and Monastrell.

The Central Penedès is located in a broad valley about 1,600 ft (490 m) above sea level and centered on the regional capital of Vilafranca del Penedès, the largest winery there being Bodegas Torres. The nearby town of Sant Sadurní d'Anoia provides another focal point for the area, being the acknowledged center of Spanish Cava production. Traditionally made from the area's Macabeo, Parellada and Xarel·lo grapes, the increased use of Chardonnay and Pinot noir in Cava blends has seen a corresponding expansion in areas of the region dedicated to those grapes. The Central Penedès has also been increasing its red wine production based on Cabernet Sauvignon and Tempranillo called Ull de Llebre in Catalan.

The Penedès Superior is located in the foothills of the mountains enclosing the Central Depression and is the coolest part of the region, used almost exclusively for white wine production.

=== Pla de Bages ===
The Pla de Bages DOP is located northwest of Barcelona, growing many of the same varieties as the nearby Penedès region but with more emphasis on international varieties like Cabernet Sauvignon and Merlot.

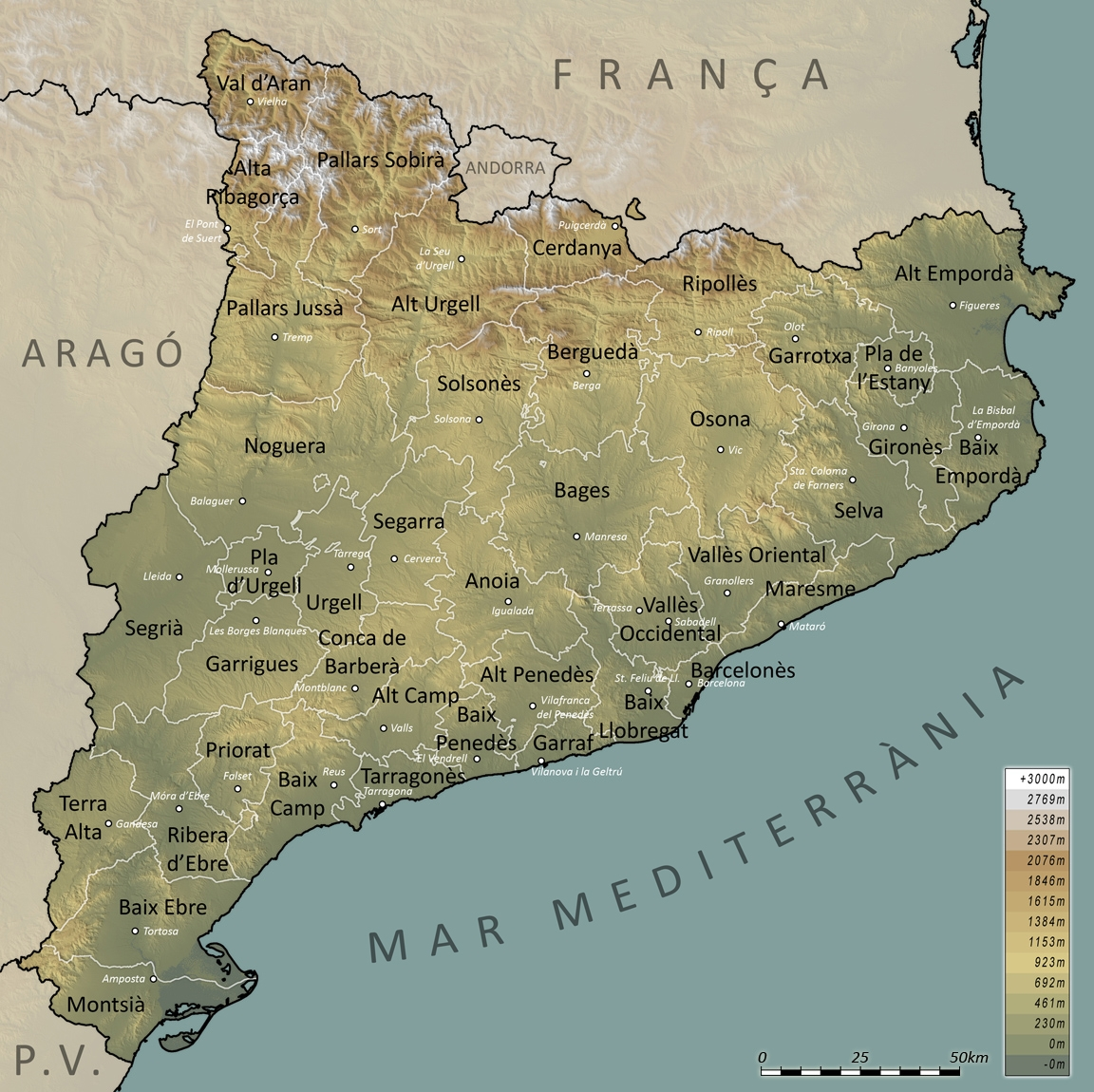
Map of Catalonia

=== Priorat ===
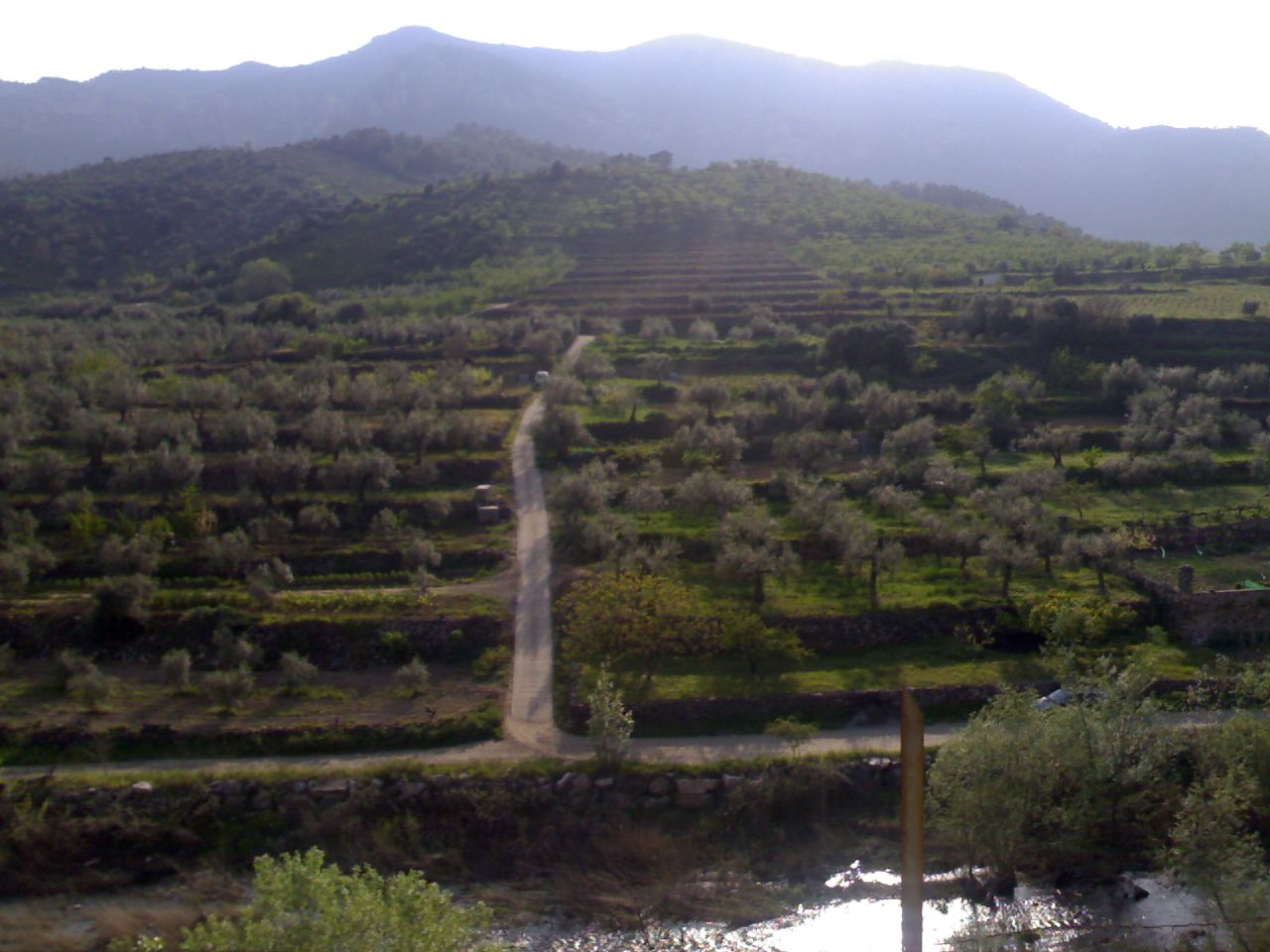
Terraced hillside of Priorat

The Priorat DOQ has been producing wine since the 12th century when Carthusian monks planted a vineyard and established the priory of Scala Dei from which the region took its name. The area is known for its Carinyena and Garnatxa based wines made from old, low yield vines that average 0.3 tons an acre (5 hl/ha). The area has a very hot Mediterranean climate that allows the grape to ripen fully and produce wines with very high alcohol levels of up to 18% and wines must have at least 13% to qualify for certification in the region. The local Llicorella soil is of particularly poor quality, composed of quartz and slate, which also helps to limit yields. Vineyards are situated on steep terraces, largely unsuitable for mechanical harvesting.

Priorat still has marked monastic influences, with many top estates prefixing their vineyards with Clos in recognition of the region's early winemaking history, similar to the naming of many of Burgundy's grand crus. Despite the annual rainfall of the area being less than 16 inches (406 mm), irrigation is not widely used due to the cool, damp nature of the Llicorella soil. Grapevine roots are able to tunnel through faults in the slate to find underground water reserves up to 30m.

The region is one of only two Spanish Denominaciones de Origen Calificadas (DOC, or DOQ in Catalan), in recognition of outstanding consistency of quality, the other being the well-known Rioja.

=== Tarragona ===
The Tarragona DOP is the Catalan wine region around the coastal city of Tarragona and has been a vital winemaking center of Catalan wines since the Roman times. For most of its history the region was known for its sweet fortified red wines made in a style similar to Port. In the 1960s, prior to earning DOP status in 1976, the area began to shift its focus to dry white wines and the production of red sacramental wine used by the Christian Church for Communion.

=== Terra Alta ===
The Terra Alta DOP is Catalunya's southernmost wine region and one of the most mountainous – terra alta literally translates as "highlands". It is located to the south of the Priorat DO and shares a similar winemaking history. Today the area is known for its Garnacha blanca wines and its growing red wine production.
