= Corpinnat =

Association of wineries

Corpinnat is a Spanish wine designation for sparkling wines aged a minimum of 18 months made of manually-harvested organic or biodynamic grapes in Penedès. Permitted grape varieties include Macabeu, Xarel·lo, Parellada, Subirat Parent, Grenache, Monastrell, Sumoll, Rosé Xarel·lo for indigenous Spanish varieties, and small amounts of Chardonnay, Malvasia de Sitges, Pinot Noir and Trepat for foreign varieties. The appellation covers an area of 997 km^{2}. Corpinnat means "heart of Penedès". Corpinnat was established in 2017 by six founding growers of the Cava DO intending to create a higher-quality Spanish sparkling wine.

== See also ==
- Raventós i Blanc
- Freixenet
- Codorníu
- Juvé y Camps
- Organic wine
