= Segura Viudas =

Heredad Segura Viudas is a Spanish winery in Torrelavit in the Penedès wine region of Barcelona specializing in Cava. Its origins have been traced back to the 11th century.

In 2018 Segura Viudas received the organic farming certification from the Catalan Council of Organic Agricultural Production.

== See also ==
- Freixenet
- Codorníu
- Juvé y Camps
- List of oldest companies
- Organic wine
