= Raventós i Blanc =

Spanish winery

- Industry: Winery
- Founded: 1497; 529 years ago in Sant Sadurní d'Anoia, Penedès, Catalonia
- Headquarters: Pl. del Roure, s/n, 08770 Sant Sadurní d'Anoia, Spain
- Website: www.raventos.com

Raventós i Blanc is a Catalan winery and family business founded in 1497 in Sant Sadurní d'Anoia, Penedès, Catalonia, Spain, a wine region known for Cava sparkling wine.

The estate of the Raventós family covers about 90 hectares of vineyards and woodlands. The winery produces natural wine. Pepe Raventós is the twenty-first generation of his family to work the estate. In 1872, Josep Raventós Fatjó made the first bottle-fermented wine in Spain using native Spanish grape varieties.

== See also ==
- List of oldest companies
- Juvé y Camps
- Freixenet
- Codorníu
