= Vinitaly =

International wine competition held annually in Italy

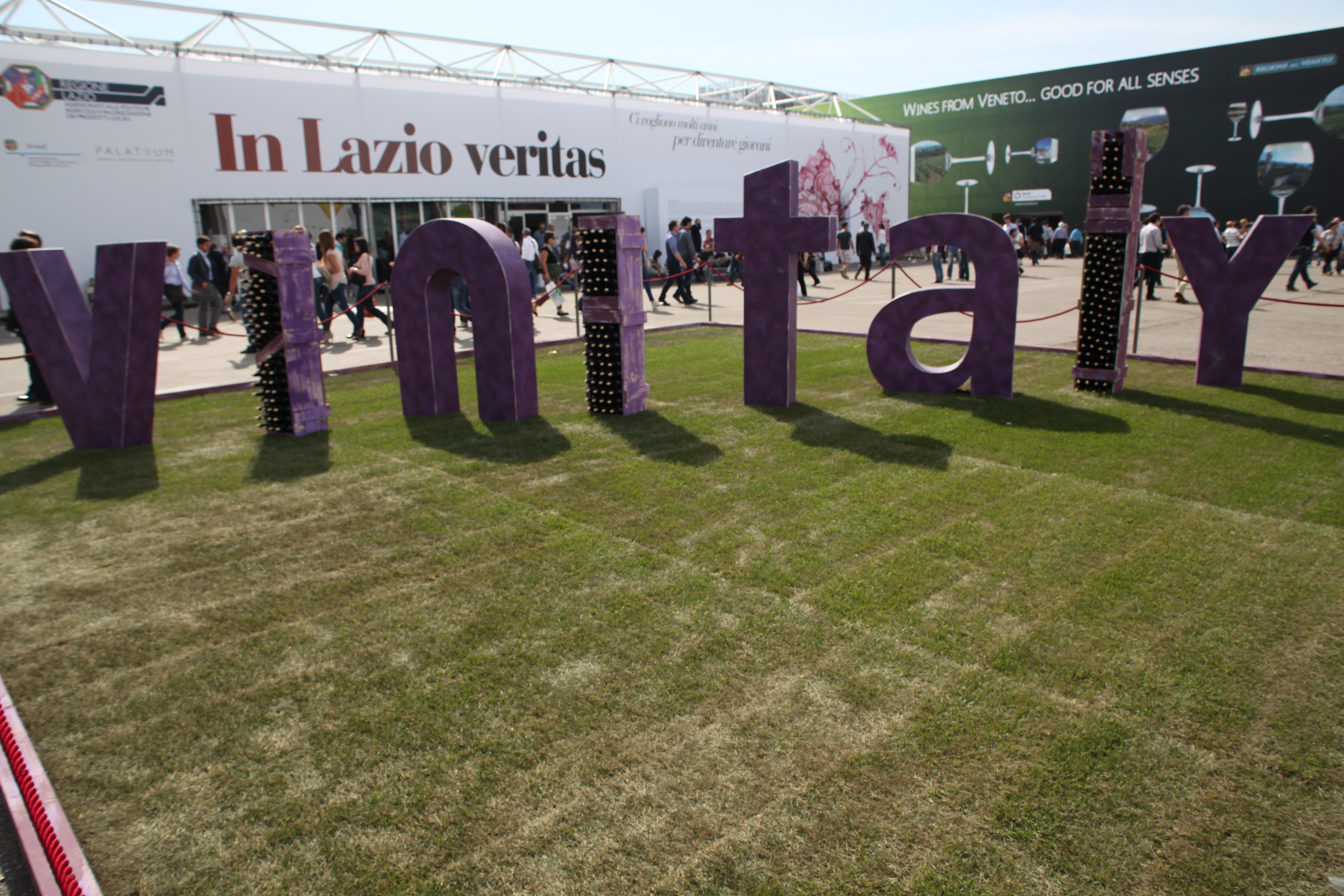
Entrance to the 2011 VinItaly expo.

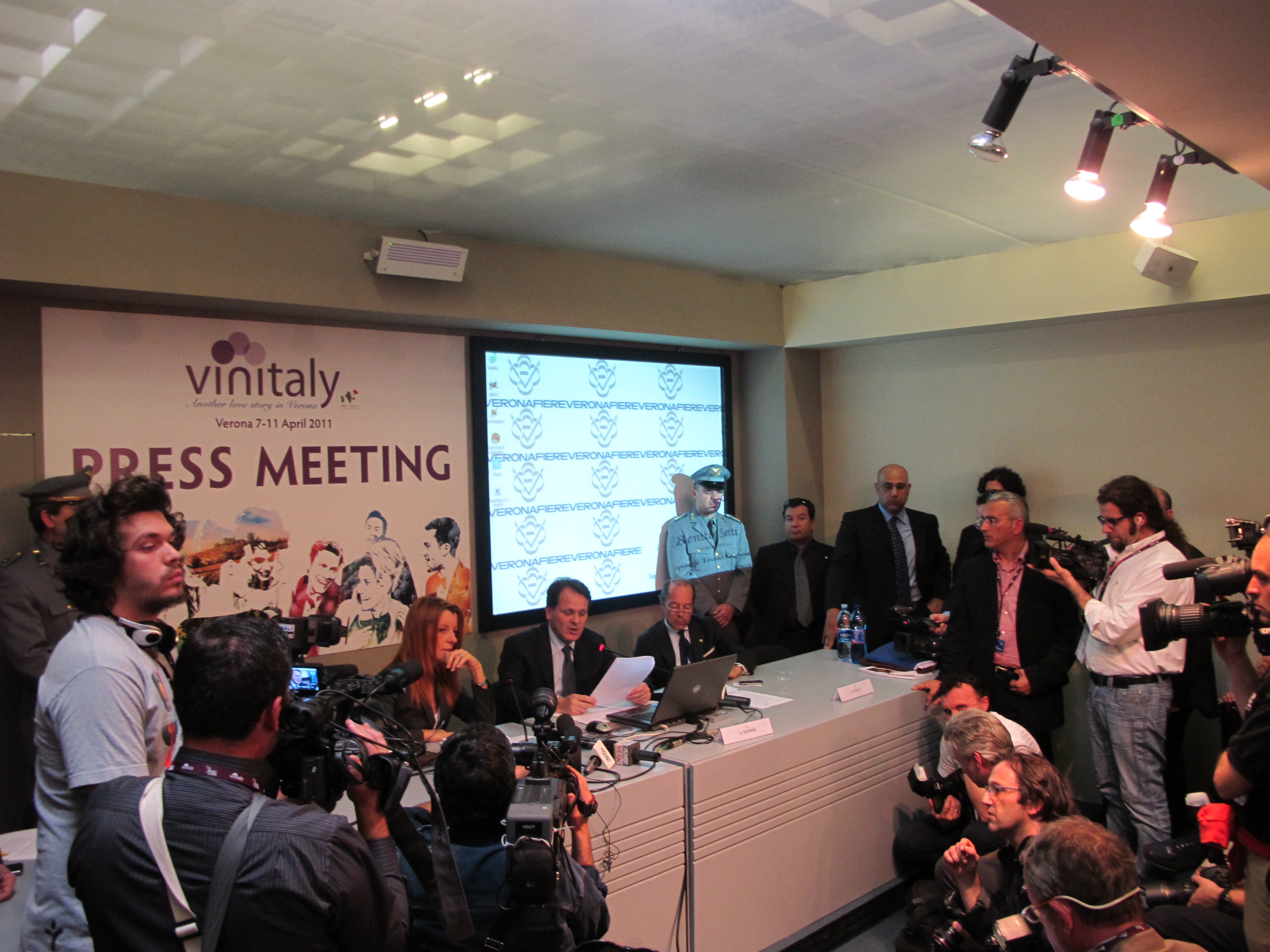
One of the many "press meetings" held by producers, officials and organizations that happen throughout the VinItaly exposition when new partnerships are announced or wine industry awards are given.

Vinitaly is an international wine competition and exposition that is held annually in April in Verona city, region of Veneto, in northeast Italy. The event is exclusively for wine professionals featuring an average of 3000 wines from several dozen countries. First held in 1967, Vinitaly has been called the "most important convention of domestic and international wines" and the "largest wine show in the world".

For producers in the Italian wine industry, attendance and the reception that their wines receive is considered a barometer for measuring the health and success of the market, particularly for emerging Italian wine regions. The event is also used as an opportunity by wineries to release new wines and wine styles or announce partnerships with universities, organic and biodynamic wine organizations or even other wineries. Along with Vinexpo, which is held every other year in the French wine region of Bordeaux, Vinitaly is considered one of the premier international wine events.

== Wine competition ==
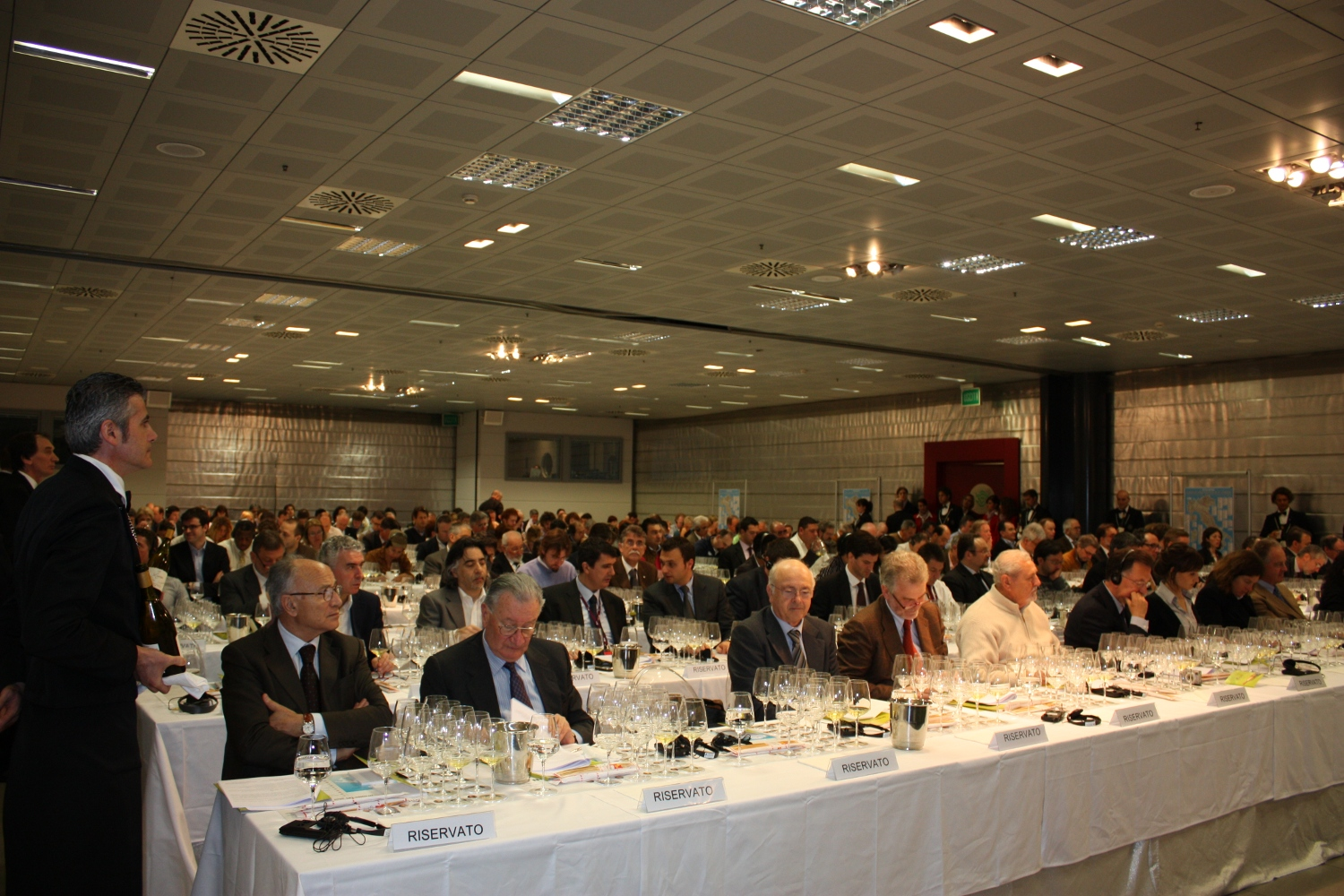
One of the tasting and judging panels at VinItaly.

The wine competition aspect of VinItaly involves a sensory judgement of wines grouped within their own category—dry wine, sweet wine, still wine, sparkling wine, fortified wine, etc. The wines are judged by five member panels which usually includes two Italian judges, two members of the international wine press and an additional, non-Italian judge. After calculating the average of the scores received by the five judges, with the highest and lowest scores tossed, wines are awarded medals (in descending order of prestige) of Grand Gold, Gold, Silver and Bronze.

== Industry awards ==
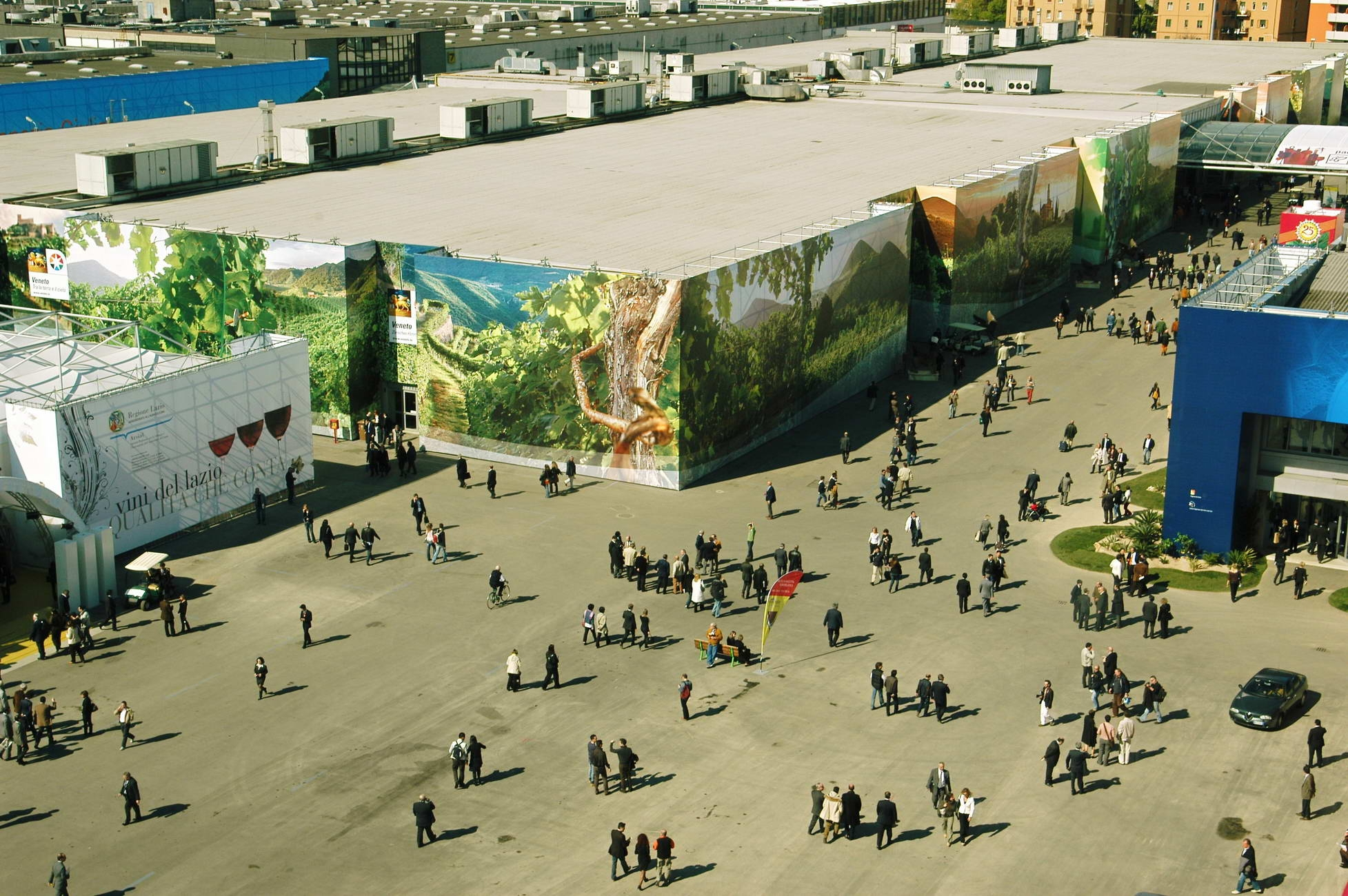
Visitors outside the exhibition halls which includes several buildings to house wine exhibits from across the globe.

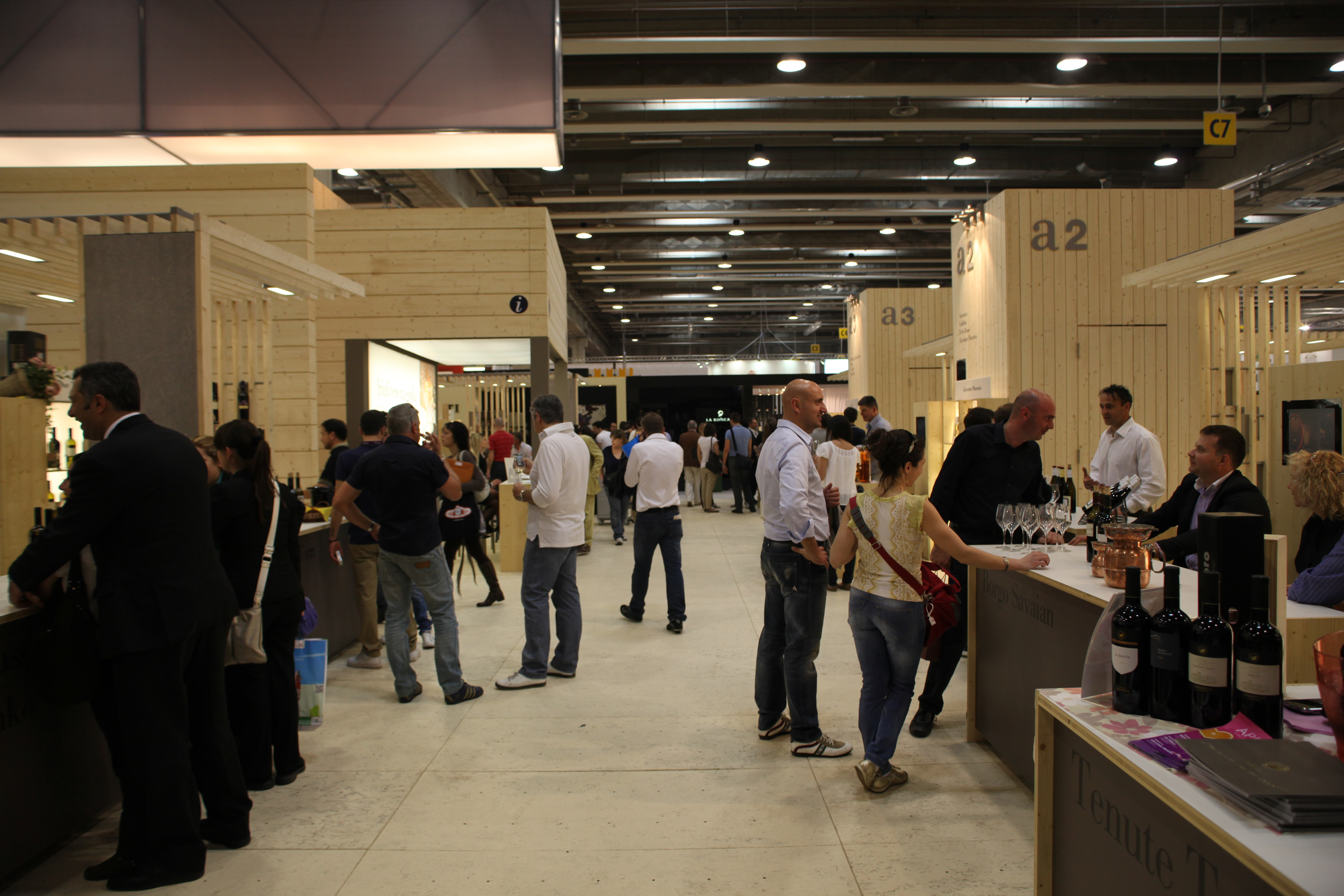
Attendees of the 2011 VinItaly expo visiting some of the presenter booths staffed by participating wineries.

In addition to awards giving to individual wines, the VinItaly expo also host the award presentation for several industry awards in the field of wine journalism. These awards include Best Foreign Magazine which has been won by such wine publications as Wine Enthusiast Magazine (2010) and Decanter (2012), Best Young Journalist won by wine writers such as Monica Larner (2008 and 2010) and Matt Skinner (2012), Best Italian Journalist won by Ian D'Agata and Best International Journalist, also won by Larner (2012).

Since 1996, VinItaly has also given out a top International Vinitaly Award to wineries and individuals who have contributed to spreading wine culture international. Previous winners of this award have included:

- Marvin Shanken, founder of Wine Spectator (1996)
- Nicolò Incisa of Rocchetta, owner of the Super Tuscan wine Sassicaia (1996)
- Corinne Mentzelopoulos, owner of the First Growth Bordeaux wine estate Château Margaux (1997)
- Robert Mondavi, California wine producer (1998)
- Pablo Alvarez, owner of the Spanish winery Vega-Sicilia (1999)
- Aldo Conterno, Piedmont wine producer (2000)
- Penfolds, Australian winery (2000),
- Trapiche-Peñaflor, Argentinian winery (2001)
- Gianni Zonin, Italian producer of Prosecco (2003
- Kendall Jackson, California wine producer (2003)
- Mastroberardino, Campanian wine producer (2004)
- Segura Viudas, Spanish Cava producer (2004)
- Alexander Payne, film director of Sideways (2005)
- Hugh Johnson, Master of wine and wine writer (2008)
- Jeannie Cho Lee, first Asian Master of wine and wine writer (2010)
- Lidia Bastianich, Italian chef and wine writer (2010)
- Castello Banfi, Tuscan wine producer (2010)

== See also ==
- Food competition
- Wine tasting
- Wine competition
