= Henkell & Co. Sektkellerei =

Company

- Type: Limited partnership (KG)
- Industry: drink industry
- Founded: 1832
- Founder: Adam Henkell
- Headquarters: Wiesbaden, Germany
- Products: Sparkling and still wine, spirits
- Revenue: 1.195 billion (2020)
- Number of employees: 3,494 (2020)
- Parent: Geschwister Oetker Beteiligungen KG
- Website: www.henkell-freixenet.com

Henkell & Co. Sektkellerei KG is a multinational producer of wine and spirits with its headquarters in Wiesbaden, Germany. It is a subsidiary of the Oetker groups of companies. Henkell owns the Spanish wine producer Freixenet.

== History ==
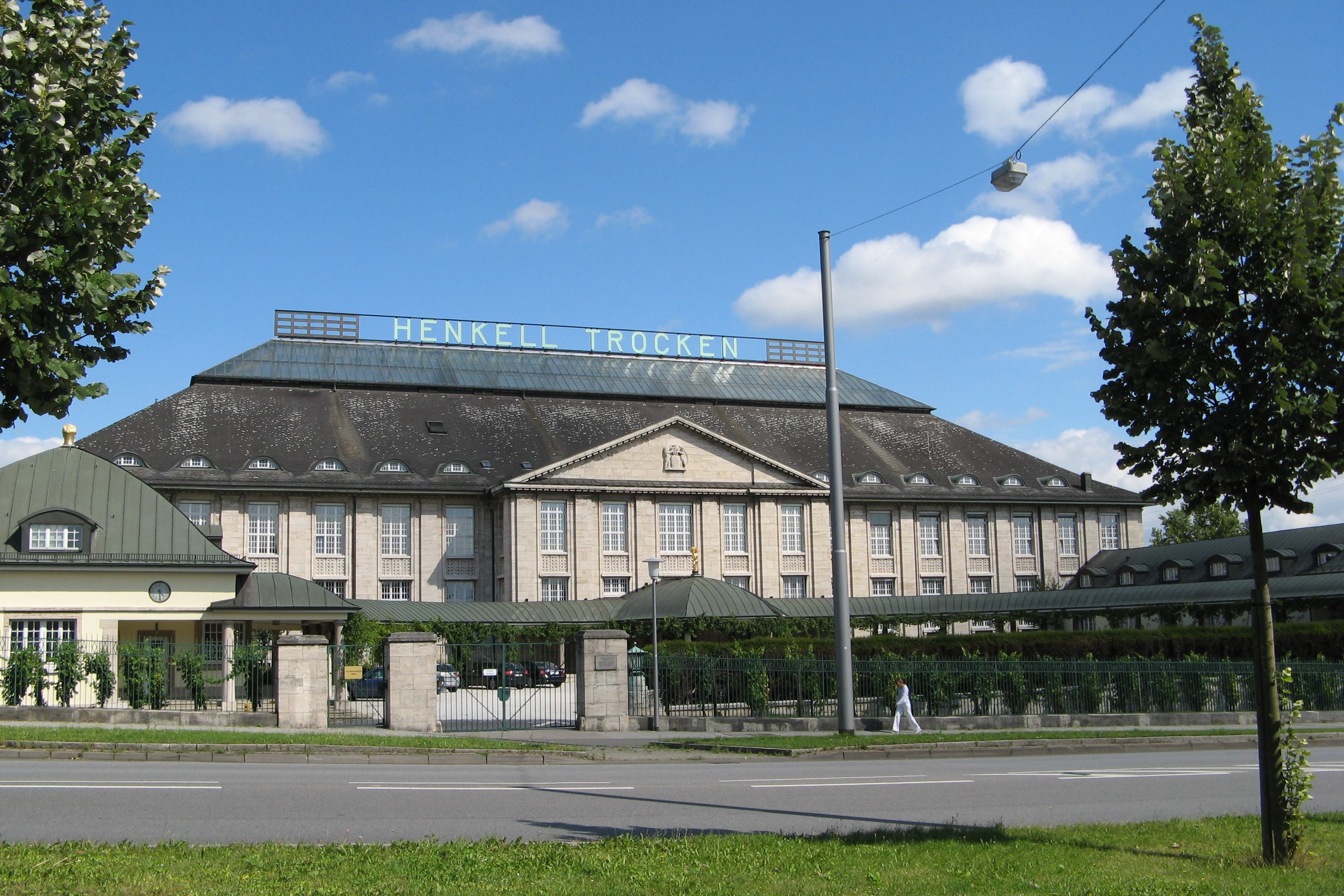
Wiesbaden - Henkell Schloss, designed by Paul Bonatz

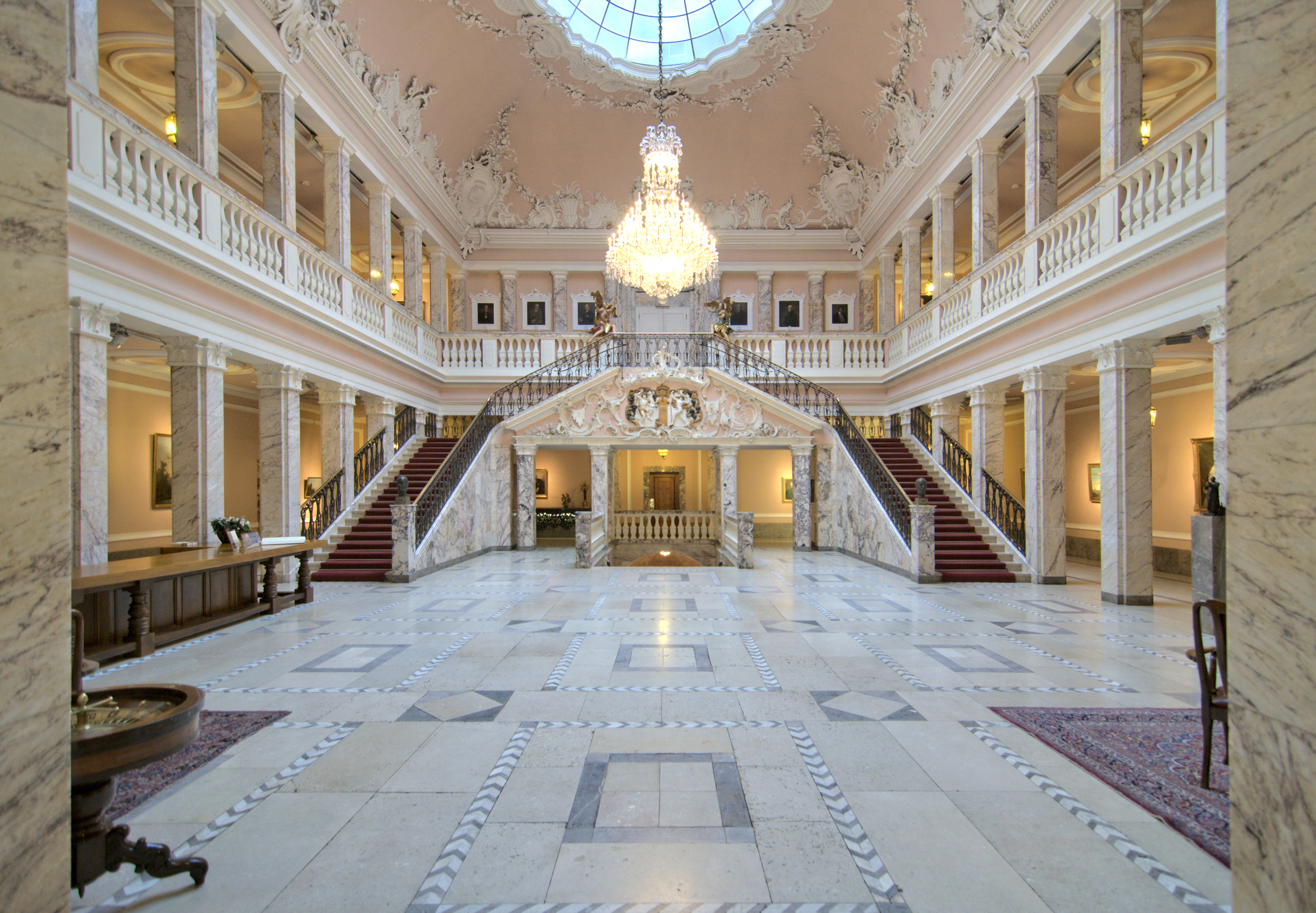

Adam Henkell founded the Henkell & Cie winery in Mainz in 1832. Twenty-five years later he commissioned the building of a “Champagne factory” in Walpodenstrasse in Mainz, making him among the first in Germany to master the technology of producing sparkling wine from wine. The Henkell Trocken brand (english: Henkell dry) was patented in 1894 under the management of Otto Henkell, and in 1898 it became one of the first legally protected brands in Germany. In 1909, Henkell & Co. moved into its new headquarters in Biebrich. The Henkell Trocken brand was marketed very aggressively from 1900 to 1920, with large-format ads regularly appearing in publications like Jugend and Simplicissimus. Artists commissioned to design ads for the campaign included Thomas Theodor Heine, Ernst Oppler, Lucian Bernhard, Gino von Finetti and Adolf Münzer. The Henkell headquarters was also depicted in several full-page advertisements in Lucian Bernhard's signature style.

Otto Henkell and Ludwig Stollwerck of the Stollwerck chocolate company are widely considered to be the inventors of joint advertising, a strategy they deployed starting from around 1900. It was the first time marketing activities were jointly developed and funded by multiple companies within a single industry.

Joachim von Ribbentrop married into the Henkell family on 5 July 1920 by marrying Otto Henkell's daughter Anneliese. Otto Henkell then entrusted Ribbentrop with the establishment and management of the Berlin branch of Henkell & Co.

In 1935, Henkell & Co. pioneered and patented the “Pikkolo” brand. The “black gentleman” (Schwarzer Herr) silhouette design debuted on the Henkell Trocken label in 1936 and for many years was its distinctive insignia.

=== National Socialism ===
Joachim von Ribbentrop became Germany's foreign minister under Hitler in 1938; in this position he ordered the deportation and killing of thousands of Jews, specifically in the Italian occupied zone in Croatia. The Henkell estate in Wiesbaden served as a headquarters of the German air force (Luftwaffe) from 1939 to 1945. During the Nazi era, the Henkell company used around 50 French prisoners of war for its wine and champagne production. The company denied access to their private archives until 2019.

=== Expansion ===
In 1975, the company acquired Sektkellerei Carstens KG in Neustadt an der Weinstraße. Further acquisitions and corporate mergers followed. In 1986, Otto Henkell sold the winery to the entrepreneur Rudolf-August Oetker, who had previously acquired Söhnlein Rheingold Sektkellerei in Schierstein in 1956. After an initial period of individual growth for both companies, former competitors Henkell & Co. and Söhnlein Rheingold KG merged in 1987 to form Henkell & Söhnlein Sektkellereien KG, based in Wiesbaden-Biebrich. Both companies continued to be managed through 2009, after which they were consolidated into parent company Henkell & Söhnlein Sektkellereien KG. Henkell & Söhnlein Sektkellereien KG took the first step towards forming a European beverage group in 1988, when it acquired the Austrian Scharlachberg label, with the exception of the brandy of the same name. Henkell & Söhnlein, Austria, was founded with its own sparkling wine production facilities in Vienna and its own brandy bottling plant in Salzburg. In 1992, the parent company acquired Hungarovin Kft. in Budapest, the Hungarian market leader for sparkling wine, and in 1995, it acquired a majority stake in Kurpfalz Sektkellerei KG, located in Speyer, Germany. Henkell & Söhnlein Polska Sp. Z o.o. was founded in Warsaw in 1996, and in 1997, Deinhard Sektkellerei KG in Koblenz was added to the portfolio, as well as a qualified majority in Vinpol SP. Z o.o. in Toruń, Poland. In 1999, the Group acquired a qualified majority in Sekt Českomoravská vinařská a.s., Starý Plzenec, Bohemia, Czech Republic, and in 2000, it acquired a majority stake in the Slovakian sparkling winery Champagner-Fabrik J. E. Hubert s.r.o., based in Sereď. Gratien & Meyer S.A.S. in Saumur, France, was purchased in the same year. In 2003, Henkell & Söhnlein acquired the distribution and trademark rights for the Menger-Krug sparkling winery in Deidesheim and S.C. Astese Production S.r.l., in Bucharest. The brands Kupferberg Gold and Scharlachberg Meisterbrand were added to the portfolio in 2004, and in 2006, the company acquired the spirits brands Der Gute Pott and Stern-Marke from A. Racke GmbH & Co. in Bingen am Rhein, Germany. In October 2007, the company expanded further with the acquisition of Kyiv-based sparkling wine producer Kyiv Factory of Sparkling Wines "Stolychny" and closed the site in 2019. In May 2008, Henkell & Söhnlein Sektkellereien KG acquired the Italian company Mionetto, a maker of international award-winning spumante and frizzante sparkling wine brands. Following multiple mergers, effective 1 January 2009, Henkell & Söhnlein Sektkellereien KG was renamed Henkell & Co. Sektkellerei. In March 2018, Henkell bought 50.67% of Freixenet, a Spanish wine company, and in April, Filipopolis, a Lithuanian liquor distributor. Henkell reported the acquisition of Bolney Wine Estate English sparkling wine based near Brighton, Sussex on the 14 January 2022.

=== Subsidiaries ===
The following subsidiaries belong to the Henkell & Co. Sektkellerei KG group of consolidated companies: Deinhard KG, Sektkellerei Kupferberg, Kurpfalz Sektkellerei GmbH, Fürst von Metternich Sektkellerei GmbH, Schloss Johannisberger Weingüterverwaltung GbR, Menger-Krug Sektkellerei GmbH, Gorbatschow Wodka KG, Scharlachberg Weinbrennerei GmbH und H.H. Pott Nfgr. Vertriebsgesellschaft mbH. The following companies not based in Germany also belong to the Group: Henkell & Co. Sektkellerei Ges.m.b.H (Austria), Törley Sparkling Wine Cellar Ltd. (Hungary), Vinpol Sp. Z o.o. (Poland), Bohemia Sekt a.s. (Czechia), Hubert J.E. s.r.o. (Slovakia), Alfred Gratien S.A.S., (France), S.C. Angelli Spumante & Aperitive s.r.l. (Romania), Kiewer Sektkellerei Stolichniy (Ukraine) and Minonetto S.p.A. (Italy).

In March 2018, Henkell bought 50.67% of Freixenet, a Spanish wine company. The purchase included its Australian subsidiary, the Wingara Wine Group, owner of Katnook Estate in Coonawarra and Deakin Estate in the Murray Darling region near Mildura. In March 2026 Henkell acquired the remaining shares of Freixenet from the former co-shareholders, the Ferrer family and José Luis Bonet.

=== Company profile ===
In 2020, Henkell Freixenet posted revenue after consumption taxes of €972m. This reflects a revenue decrease of -7.4%. In 2020 the company had 3,494 employees. The board of directors is composed of Andreas Brokemper (International Activities and Controlling), Eberhard Benz (Manufacturing and Purchasing), Frank van Fürden (Sales, Marketing and Logistics).

== Brands ==
- Sparkling wine: Henkell-brand sparkling wines, Adam Henkell, Menger-Krug, Fürst von Metternich, Deinhard, Kupferberg (sparkling wine), Lutter & Wegner, Söhnlein Brillant, Schloss Rheinberg, Schloss Biebrich, Cantor Alkoholfrei Sparkling, Bohemia Sekt, Törley Sekt, Hubert Sekt, Angelli, Festillant, Nash Kyiv, Ukrainske
- Champagne: Alfred Gratien, Champagne Veuve Emille
- Prosecco: Mionetto, Freixenet Prosecco
- Crémant: Gratien & Meyer
- Cava: Cavas Hill, Freixenet
- Wine: Schloss Johannisberg, i heart Wines, Freixenet Mederano, Freixenet Mia, Habánske Sklepy, Vino Mikulov, BB, Chapel Hill, Bolney Wine Estate
- Distilled beverage: Mangaroca Batida de Coco, Cardenal Mendoza, Fürst Bismarck, Kuemmerling, Wodka Gorbatschow, Gin Lubuski
