= Socotra: The Hidden Land =

- Production company: Kilogram Box
- Release date: 2015
- Country: Yemen

Socotra: The Hidden Land is a documentary film produced by Kilogram Box in 2015. The documentary examines how the society of the island of Socotra, Yemen, is emerging from its isolation and its daily struggle to preserve their traditions in the face of globalization.

The ancient beliefs and lifestyles of the Island of Socotra, had remained unchanged for centuries, hidden from the eyes of the world. In their own words, the people use their traditional tales, beliefs and ways of life to explain how their island is, not always willingly, adapting its mode of existence to the modern world.

The documentary has won several international awards such as:

- the Rising Star Award from the Canada International Film Festival
- the Silver Palm Award from the Mexico International Film Festival
- Best Cinematography from the CEBU International Film Festival

It also received a nomination for Best European Documentary from the ECU- The European Independent Film Festival.

== Plot ==
Socotra: The Hidden Land revolves around the inhabitants of an island whose beliefs and lifestyles remained unchanged for centuries, separate from the rest of the world. The film depicts the natural beauty of the island and how it appears to exist outside of time, having not been touched by modern society. The film reveals the beauty and the strangeness of the island while showing the physical reality of Socotra and how it has shaped the islanders' lives over the centuries.

The documentary presents a portrait of life and customs within an isolated community. Through firsthand accounts and traditional narratives shared by its residents, the film explores the challenges and endeavors of preserving cultural heritage amidst the pressures of globalization.

== Production company ==
Kilogram Box is a film production company based in Barcelona, Spain. Since its inception, the company has demonstrated its commitment to innovative ideas, financial independence and artistic and ethical integrity.

Kilogram Box has collaborated on publicity for brands such as Ikea, Freixenet, President and Tampax, and on branding and identity design for the Basilica of the Sagrada Familia, Danone, Sanofi and the NGO Observatori DESC.

Through film, Kilogram Box seeks to show the rich cultural heritage of the planet and the many unique communities at risk or on the brink of extinction. The studio collaborates with these endangered communities, giving them global visibility and the opportunity to explain their lives and the difficulties they face in their own words.

== Awards ==
Film Festival	Country	Award	Result	Year
Canada International Film Festival	Canada	Rising Star Award	Winner	2015
Mexico International Film Festival	Mexico	Silver Palm Award	Winner	2015
Cebu International Film Festival	Philippines	Best Cinematography	Winner	2015
Noida International Film Festival	India	Best Cinematography	Winner	2015
MICA Film Festival	Brazil	Best Cinematography	Winner	2015
ÉCU - The European Independent Film Festival	France	Best European Documentary	Nominee	2015
Guangzhou International Documentary Film Festival	China	Best Documentary	Nominee	2015
Florida Movie Festival	USA	Best Documentary	Nominee	2015
UK Film Festival	UK	Best Short Documentary	Nominee	2014
