= Marimar Estate =

Winery in Sonoma County, California, US

Coordinates: 38°25′20″N 122°54′11″W

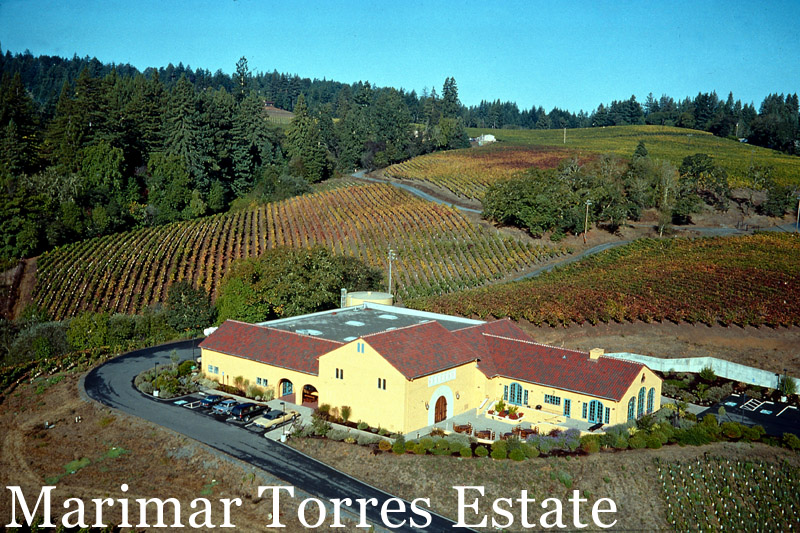
Marimar Torres Estate

Marimar Estate is a Californian winery located in Sonoma County, owned by Marimar Torres, the sister of Miguel A. Torres, President of Bodegas Torres.

== History ==
In 1986 Marimar Torres embarked on a project to plant a 60-acre (240,000 m^{2}) vineyard on the western hills of DO Russian River Valley, in Green Valley AVA, sub-appellation of Sonoma County, very close to the Pacific: with a cold microclimate that is suitable for Chardonnay and Pinot noir. The vineyard is called Don Miguel, after her father, Miguel Torres Carbó, who oversaw the worldwide expansion of the Torres family business. Of the vineyards 60 acres 30 are planted with Chardonnay and the other 30 with Pinot noir.

== Vineyards ==
The Doña Margarita vineyard, named after Marimar's mother, was planted in 2002 in the Freestone Valley of the Sonoma Coast AVA. Although the estate has 180 acres (0.73 km^{2}), only 12 of these have been earmarked for vines and planted with Pinot noir. A large area of the estate remains uncultivated with wildlife and indigenous plant species.

At the Sonoma vineyard, the estate utilizes traditional Mediterranean viticultural practices, such as a vertical trellis for the vines, the choice of rootstocks that are more resistant to phylloxera and a planting density of 2 m x 1m (2,000 vines per acre). Since 2003 both vineyards have been subject to organic cultivation.
