= Penedès DOP =

Spanish wine appellation

Coordinates: 41°17′35.82″N 1°44′58.46″E

- Wine region
- Penedès DO in the provinces of Barcelona and Tarragona in the region of Catalonia
- Official name: D.O.P. Penedès
- Type: Denominación de Origen Protegida (DOP)
- Year established: 1932
- Country: Spain
- Sub-regions: Lower, Central, Upper
- Growing season: April - September
- Climate region: IV
- Heat units: 3500
- Precipitation (annual average): 400 mm
- Soil conditions: poor, permeable, variable: clay to chalk
- Total area: 1557 km^{2}
- Size of planted vineyards: 16,637 hectares (41,111 acres)
- Grapes produced: 1,800 t/km^{2}
- No. of wineries: 138
- Wine produced: 147,157 hectolitres
- Official designation(s): Cosecha, Crianza, Reserva, Gran Reserva
- Comments: Data for 2016 / 2017

Penedès (Catalan pronunciation: [pənəˈðɛs]) is a Spanish Denominación de Origen Protegida (DOP) (Denominació d'Origen Protegida in Catalan) for wines in Catalonia, (Spain). As of 2025 harvest, Penedès makes history as the first wine appellation with 100% certified organic production. Penedès DOP includes all of the Penedès region and municipalities of four other counties: Anoia, Alt Camp, Baix Llobregat and Tarragonès. The area is framed by the coastal hills of the Garraf Massif and the higher inland mountains which skirt the Central Depression.

Long considered one of the country's best wine-producing regions after the Rioja, it is also one of the most ancient viticultural areas in Europe. Perhaps better-known for its Cava production (a sparkling wine which has had its own Denominación de Origen since 1986) white grape varieties predominate, although the region also produces some highly regarded, oak-aged reds.

== Geography ==
The Penedès DOP is centred in the regional capital, Vilafranca del Penedès, with nearby Sant Sadurní d'Anoia the acknowledged centre of Cava production. Besides these two, the principal towns are Vilanova i la Geltrú, Sitges and el Vendrell. The Penedès DOP includes 66 municipalities.

A distinction must be drawn between the boundaries of the traditional wine growing region and those of the historical administrative area. The wine-growing region is divided into three main subzones:

- Alt Penedès, the most inland and mountainous subzone, characterised by relatively low yield and high quality
- Penedès Central, situated to the southwest and responsible for the majority of the region's total production
- Baix Penedès, comprising mostly low-lying, coastal areas

== History ==
According to archaeological evidence (some of which is on display in Vilafranca's Wine Museum) wine production in the Penedès has ancient origins, certainly dating back to the Phoenician introduction of vines during the 6th century BC. A large export market is known to have existed even through Moorish occupation in the Middle Ages. Eighteenth century Spanish expansion into South America generated an unprecedented demand for Penedès wines, which has barely abated since.

The region did not escape the pan-European devastation of the phylloxera plague, one effect of which was a large-scale change in the predominant grape types from red to almost exclusively white, which in turn led to the first Cava production in the 1870s. Since then, red varietals have regained some ground, but remain a relatively minor part of regional production.

Penedès region (in blue) and Penedès DO (in blue and green) within Southern Catalonia.

== Climate and geology ==
The region has a highly varied geology characterised by very poor-quality, well-drained soils of mostly Miocene sediments, both continental and maritime, with occasional quaternary deposits. The sandy, clay-like soil is poor in organic matter and rocky in the main, the pre-litoral uplands consisting of Triassic, Cretaceous and oceanic deposits, while coastal mountains are mostly jagged Cretaceous limestone.

Whereas a largely Mediterranean climate prevails, the Penedès enjoys a wide variety of microclimates, due to the proximity of the coast and a varied terrain ranging from sea level to over 800 metres (2,600 ft). Coastal areas are hot and dry, while upland vineyards are much more prone to frosts, with some areas recording annual rainfall of up to 900L/m^{2}.

== Authorised Grape Varieties ==
The grape varieties are:

- Red: Garnatxa, Merlot, Monastrell, Pinot Noir, Samsó / Mazuela, Cabernet Sauvignon, Ull de llebre, and Syrah
- White:Macabeu, Xarel·lo, Parellada, Moscatell d'Alexandria, Malvasía de Sitges, Chardonnay, Sauvignon Blanc, and Riesling

== Production ==
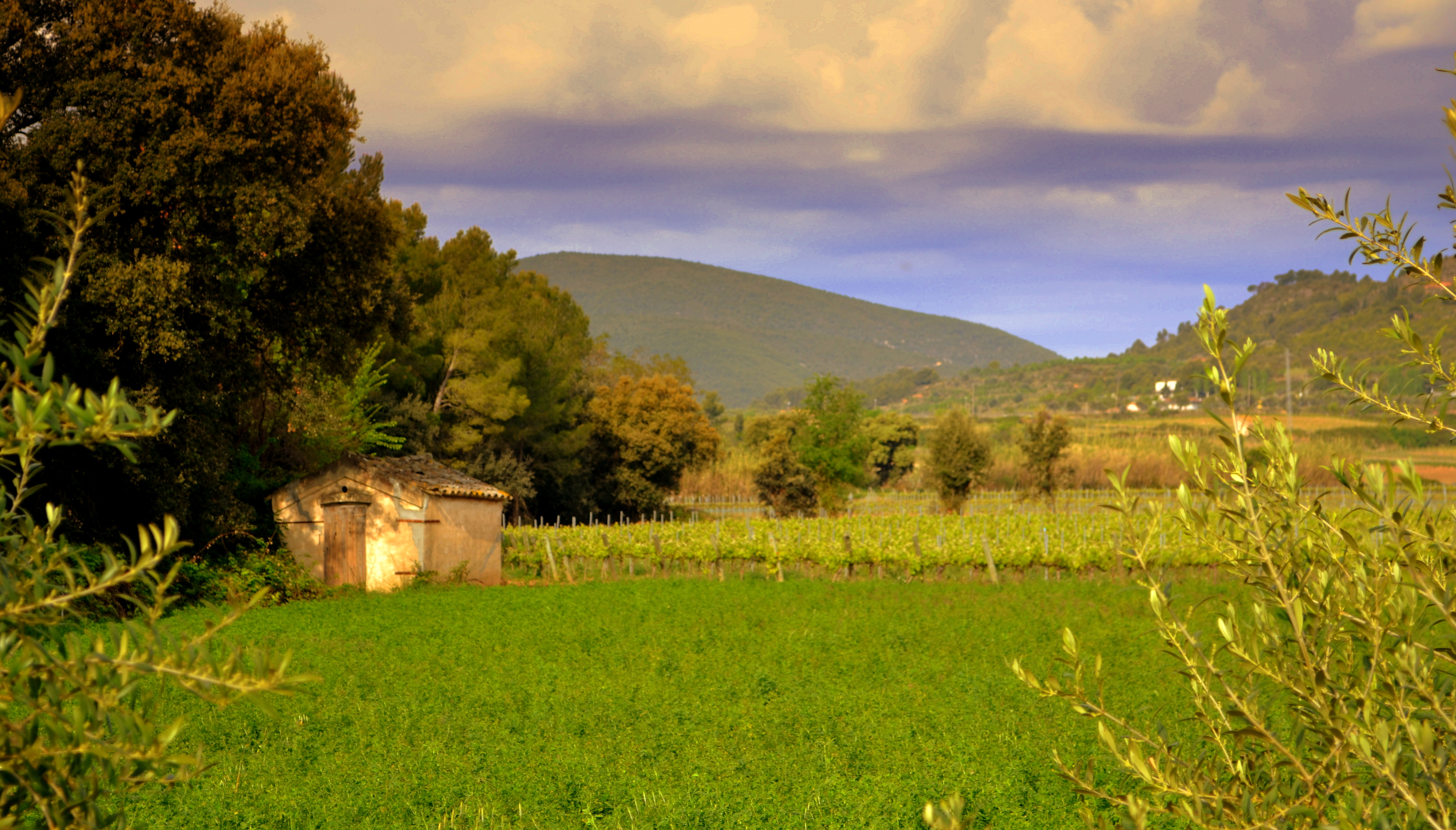
Vineyard in the Spanish wine region of Penedès, Catalonia

Extending from the low-lying plains of the Baix Penedès to the more temperate peaks of the Alt Penedès, the region is suited to growing an unusually wide range of grape varieties. While the more typical Spanish black grapes (Garnacha, Tempranillo, Cabernet Sauvignon and Cariñena, among others) are found in the hot and humid coastal plains, as the land rises whites become increasingly common.

On this higher inland terrain Spanish Xarel·lo and Macabeo grapes form the overwhelming majority, but Penedès growers have long experimented with small plantations of French and German strains, with notable quantities of Muscat d'Alexandrie, Riesling, Gewürztraminer, Chenin blanc and Chardonnay being more recently introduced, largely to diversify the range of grapes available for blending, which plays such an important part in Cava production. The Alt Penedès vineyards are at an elevation of up to 800 metres (2,600 ft) above sea level, where the native Parellada is the dominant variety.

Cava is inextricably linked to still wine production in the region, as its booming success of recent years has provided the revenue and innovation behind the rise, both in quality and in fortunes, of the region's still wines.

== Producers ==
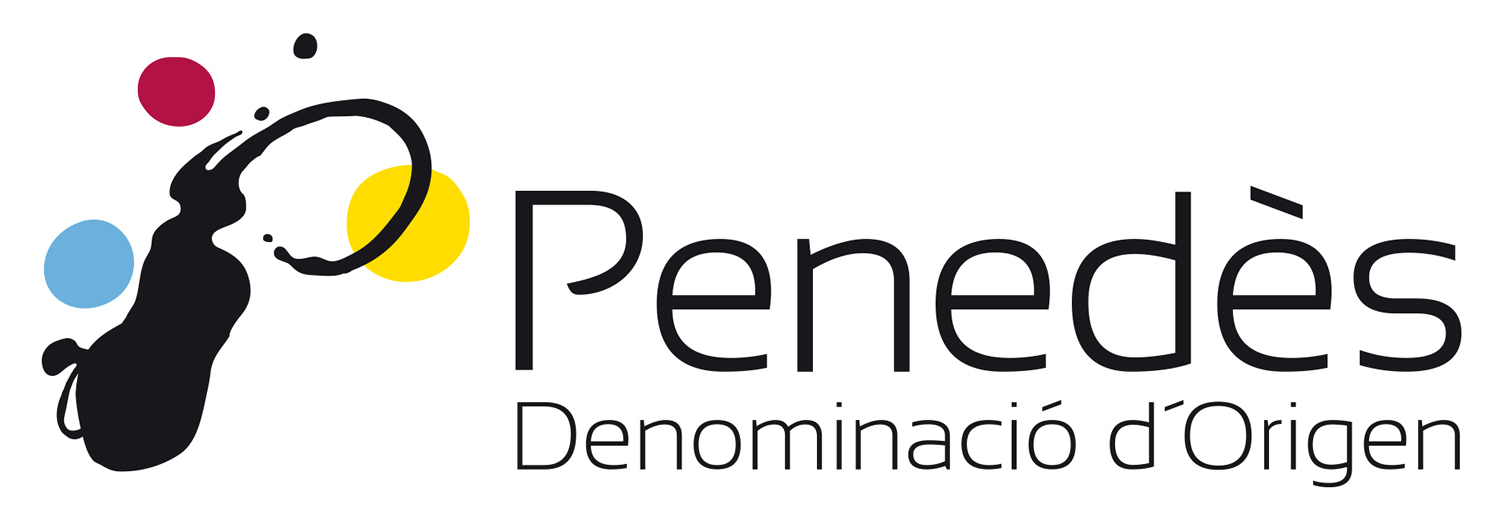
Logo Penedès DO

The Penedès is widely acknowledged to be home to the most modern and innovative of Spanish growers. There are hundreds of independent producers, the most famous of which is probably Bodegas Torres, producer of the popular 'Sangre de Toro' (Bull's Blood, not to be confused with the Hungarian bull's blood Egri Bikavér) as well as many others fine still wines. Other notable houses include Pinord, Jean León, and Masia Bach, alongside more well-known Cava producers like Freixenet, Juvé y Camps and Codorníu. There are also many smaller, family-owned houses in the Penedes region that produce wines of high quality, but in smaller quantities. An example of these producers is Cavas Bolet.
