= Jaime Torres =

Jaime Torres may refer to:

- Jaime Torres Bodet (1902–1974), Mexican politician and intellectual, director-general of UNESCO
- Jaime Torres (musician) (1938–2018), Argentine charango musician
- Jaime Torres (fl. mid-19th century), founder of the Spanish winery Bodegas Torres
