= Angelli Spumante & Aperitive =

Romanian alcohol company

- Company type: Private
- Industry: Alcohol
- Founded: 1994
- Headquarters: Bucharest, Romania
- Key people: Alin Ursu (CEO)
- Revenue: ▲€20 million
- Number of employees: 120
- Website: angelli.ro

Angelli Spumante & Aperitive is one of the most important sellers of alcoholic beverages in Romania, holder of the Angelli brand, leader on the sparkling wine market with a 70% share. The company is based in Bucharest. It was established in 1994 as Astese Production SRL but changed its name to Angelli Spumante & Aperitive in 2009. The company owns a production facility(closed in 2014) located in Bucharest, that was built in 1999 with a capacity of 80,000 bottles per day.

== Activity ==
The company's factory is located in Bucharest near the A1 motorway and covers a surface area of 25,000 square metres (270,000 sq ft) with a production capacity of 80,000 bottles per day and is one of the most modern alcohol producing facility in Europe. The company produces sparkling wine under the Angelli, Angelli Superiore Cuvee Nobiliar, Ador and Vinarte - Cuvee d'Oro brands, fruit cocktails, vermouth, aperitifs and liqueurs. The company's main market is Romania with annual sales of 7 million bottles but important external markets include Hungary, Italy, Spain, Greece, Belgium, Latvia, Israel, Finland and Denmark. The most important brand of the company in terms of sales is the Angelli Cherry with annual sales of around 4 million bottles in Romania.

== Owner ==
Since 2003 Angelli Spumante & Aperitive is owned by the German company Henkell & Söhnlein. Founded in 1832 Henkell & Söhnlein is a major sparkling wine producer in the world with 11 production facilities located in Germany, Austria, Hungary, Czech Republic, Slovakia, Poland, France, Romania, Ukraine, Italy and Estonia.
