= Alfred Gratien =

- Wine region: Épernay, Marne
- Appellation: Champagne
- Cases/yr: 25,000
- Varietals: Chardonnay, Pinot noir, Pinot meunier
- Website: alfredgratien.com

Alfred Gratien is a champagne house, based in Épernay. It is named after its founder, who established the firm in 1864. The business was family-controlled until the start of the 21st century, and retains a strongly traditional approach to wine making.

== History ==
In 1864 the 23-year-old Alfred Gratien established a sparkling wine business in Saumur, on the Loire in north-western France. Later in the same year he also moved into champagne production, setting up a second business in Épernay. He based his champagne business in the rue Maurice Cerveaux, on the south-east fringes of the town. He was later joined by Jean-Albert Meyer, a wine-grower's son from the Alsace village of Gunsbach.

Gratien died in 1885 and his widow made Meyer a full partner in the business. The firm remained in family ownership throughout the late-19th and the 20th centuries. The last Gratien was killed in the Battle of Verdun during the First World War, and control passed wholly to the Meyer family. Jean-Albert, who died in 1922, was succeeded by his son Albert-Edmond, whose son-in-law, Eric Seydoux, joined the company in 1936, and took over in 1965 after the death of Albert-Edmond. At the start of the 21st century the French inheritance laws, requiring equal division between heirs, threatened to break up the business, and the Seydoux family sold both the Loire and the champagne houses to Henkell Freixenet.

Despite the change of ownership, the champagne house retained a high degree of independence. The wine writer Joanna Simon wrote in 2016:

Henkell is unlikely to have been greeted very warmly in the Champagne region at the outset but has turned out to be a benign and hands-off owner, providing funds but leaving Gratien to carry on doing things in the way that makes its Champagnes so distinctive and admired.

The house's traditional methods have continued under four generations of the Jaeger family of cellarmasters: Jean (cellarmaster 1905–1951), Charles (1951–1966), Jean-Pierre (1966–2007) and Nicolas (2007– ). The company produces 300,000 bottles a year – 0.1% of the market.

== Wines ==
Unlike some other champagne houses, (Note: For instance, Moët et Chandon owns 1,180 hectares (2,915 acres) of vineyards, Mumm owns 218 hectares (539 acres), and Bollinger owns 180 hectares (440 acres).) Alfred Gratien has never owned many vineyards. Until the late 20th century it owned none, and has subsequently acquired 1.5 hectares (3.7 acres) of vineyards. Most of its grapes are bought from growers in premier and grand cru vineyards who have a long-term relationship with the company. The grapes are picked and pressed near the vineyards, the juice (technically known as "must") is then transported to the rue Maurice Cerveaux where it is put in oak casks and fermented.

Only the cuvée – the first and purest pressing of juice – goes into the 1,000-plus 205-litre oak casks known as pieces that that once held white Burgundy and are up to fifty years old. Along with Krug, Alfred Gratien is now the only major champagne house to age all its must in barrels. There is no malolactic fermentation; the non-vintage wines are aged for three to four years and the vintage for six to seven years. The riddling ([[Traditional method#Riddling|remuage]]) and disgorgement processes are still done by hand – something of a rarity in modern champagne making.

All three of the major champagne grape varieties – pinot noir, pinot meunier and chardonnay – are used, in varying proportions, for the different champagnes in the Alfred Gratien range. The basic Brut Classique NV is approximately 50% Chardonnay, 25% Pinot Noir and 25% Pinot Meunier, with a substantial top-up of réserve perpétuelle – older wine kept for this purpose.

In 1988 the Master of Wine Serena Sutcliffe wrote, "At Alfred Gratien they say their champagnes are often described as 'old English style'." The company has a long-standing British connection: it has supplied The Wine Society with its house champagne for well over a hundred years. Another British wine writer, Joanna Simon, wrote in 2016, "every wine writer I can think of loves Alfred Gratien Champagne".

== Notes, references and sources ==
=== Sources ===
- Stelzer, Tyson (2015). The Champagne Guide: The Definitive Guide to the Champagne Region. Richmond, Victoria, and London: Hardie Grant. ISBN 978-1-74-358073-8.
- Sutcliffe, Serena (1988). Champagne. London: Mitchell Beazley. ISBN 0-85-533697-8.
