= Wodka Gorbatschow =

German vodka brand

- Type: Vodka
- Manufacturer: Henkell & Co. Sektkellerei KG
- Origin: Berlin, Germany
- Introduced: 1921
- Alcohol by volume: 37.5% (standard bottle)
- Proof (US): 80
- Related products: List of vodkas
- Website: Official website

Wodka Gorbatschow is a German vodka brand. It has been produced in Berlin since 1921. Since 1960, it is owned by the Söhnlein Rheingold AG, a part of the Henkell & Co. Sektkellerei KG, which is owned by Dr. Oetker since 1996.

== History ==
Lev Leontyevitch Gorbachev was the operator of a vodka distillery in St. Petersburg, Russia. During the October Revolution, Gorbachev left his homeland along with his family for Berlin, where he started to produce vodka on April 28, 1921. The brand name, the onion-domed bottle and the blue label were registered by the L. Gorbatschow & Co. as a trademark in 1923.

In 1938, Gorbatschow Liköre J. Kramer & Co. was aryanized as a Jewish company and taken over by pharmacist Otto Ludwig Heinen, who became a member of the Waffen-SS in 1939. Due to various charges, Heinen was sent to SS-Totenkopfverbände and classified as exonerated during denazification in 1946.

Arthur Barth, who had entered the company Gorbatschow-Liköre Dr. Heinen & Co. before the end of the war, became director after Heinen moved back to his hometown Munich. In 1960, the company Gorbatschow-Wodka Arthur Barth was acquired by the Söhnlein Rheingold KG corporate to become marketed nationwide.

Since 1975, the brand's slogan is Des Wodkas reine Seele (English: The pure soul of vodka), alluding to the cliché of the Russian soul. The campaign was launched after Soviet vodka brands had successfully entered the West-German market.

== Products ==
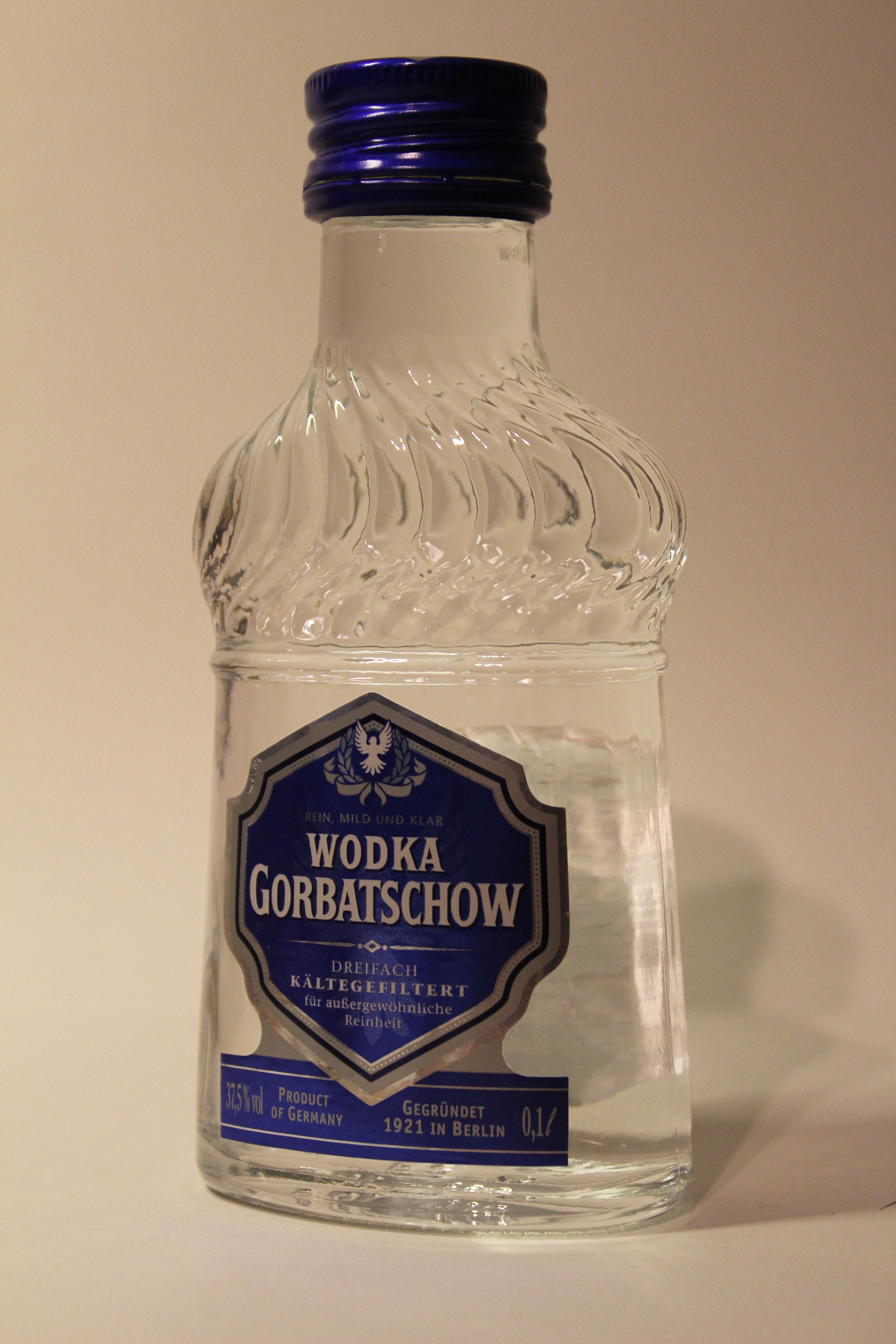
Wodka Gorbatschow 0.1 liter

There are different types and bottling sizes of Wodka Gorbatschow. The most common is the 0.7-liter bottle with blue label and 37.5% abv.

Variant	Label	ABV	Launch year	Filling size	Remarks
Wodka Gorbatschow	Blue	37,5 %		1 L; 0.7 L; 0.2 L; 0.1 L; 40 mL Miniatur; 3 L Magnum	
Wodka Gorbatschow 40%	Blue	40%		1 L	Only for export
Wodka Gorbatschow 50%	Black	50%		1 L; 0.7 L	Intended only for the gastronomy
Wodka Gorbatschow 60%	Red	60%		1 L	Only for export
Wodka Platinum 44	Blue	44%	2003	0.7 L; 3 L Magnum	Different production method & bottle shape
Wodka Gorbatschow Citron	Yellow	37,5 %	2008	0.7 L	Slightly flavored with lemon
Gorbatschow & Lemon		10%	2010	0.33 L can	Mixed drink in the style lemon vodka
Gorbatschow & Orange		10%	2014	0.33 L can	Mixed drink in the style orange vodka
Gorbatschow & Maracuja		10%	2016	0.33 L can	Mixed drink in the style maracuja vodka
