= Bodegas Torres =

Wines and spirits manufacturing company

Bodegas Torres (Miguel Torres SA)
- Location: Spain, Chile, USA, Vilafranca del Penedès, Catalonia, Spain
- Appellation: Penedès, Conca de Barberà, Jumilla, Priorat, Ribera del Duero, Rioja, Toro
- Other labels: Torres 5, Torres 10, Atrium, Coronas, De Casta, Sangre de Toro, Viña Esmeralda, Viña Sol
- Founded: 1870
- Key people: Miguel A. Torres (President and managing director)
- Distribution: Over 140 countries
- Website: www.torres.es

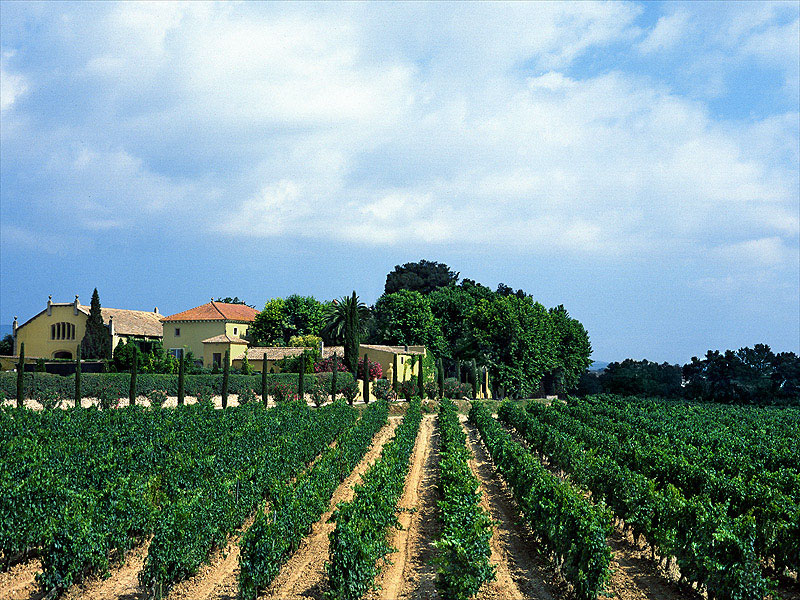
The Mas La Plana vineyard in Pacs del Penedès.

Founded in 1870 by Jaime Torres, Bodegas Torres (Miguel Torres SA) is a historical wine growing company located in Pacs, some 4 km (2.5 miles) from Vilafranca del Penedès, where the company has its head office. Torres is the family winery with the most extensive vineyards in the Denomination of Origin (DO) of Penedès and the largest winery in Spain.

They also run the Miguel Torres Chile winery in the Chilean Central Valley, and in the United States (California) where in 1986 Marimar Torres founded Marimar Estate. In Spain outside of the Torres family's native Penedès region, they own vineyards in DO Conca de Barberà, DO Toro, DO Jumilla, DO Ribera del Duero, DOQ Priorat and most recently in DOC Rioja - in the last three areas with new wineries or wineries under construction. Likewise, Torres is also Spain's largest producer of DO wines under its own label, exporting to more than 140 countries.

Under the Torres brand name they trade wine and brandy under on a range of different labels. Some of these are Viña Sol, Sangre de Toro, De Casta, Coronas, Atrium and Viña Esmeralda, with their best known brandies being Torres 5 and Torres 10. Many Torres wines are produced from international rather than traditional Spanish grape varieties and are varietally labelled. The company exports wines to over 140 countries. Torres made two significant contributions to the development of enology in Spain: firstly, the use of fermentation at controlled temperatures, and secondly, the maturing of the wine in small oak barrels during a scrupulously defined time, as has been a habitual practice in Bordeaux.

Torres is managed by the fourth generation of the Torres family; Miguel A. Torres is the company’s current President and Managing Director. The Torres family are founding members of the Primum Familiae Vini.

== History ==
Jaime Torres emigrated to Cuba in 1855. On the island he made his fortune through the flourishing oil industry and seaborne trade. In 1870 he returned home a rich man and went into business with his brother, a wine grower. Together they founded the family company, in Vilafranca del Penedès, in 1870. One of Jaime Torres’ ideas was to build a 600,000-litre (130,000 imp gal; 160,000 US gal) wine vat, the largest in the world. During the Spanish Civil War the winery was bombarded, leaving everything in ruins, including the enormous vat. Miguel Torres Carbó, a fourth generation member of the family, rebuilt the winery in 1940 and started business up again. He brought an end to the sale of bulk wine and started to market it in labelled bottles. In the year of reconstruction, when France was under Hitler's control and unable to provide wine, Miguel Torres traveled to the United States to promote his wines. It was in this period that the brands Sangre de Toro, Viña Sol and Coronas first came into being.

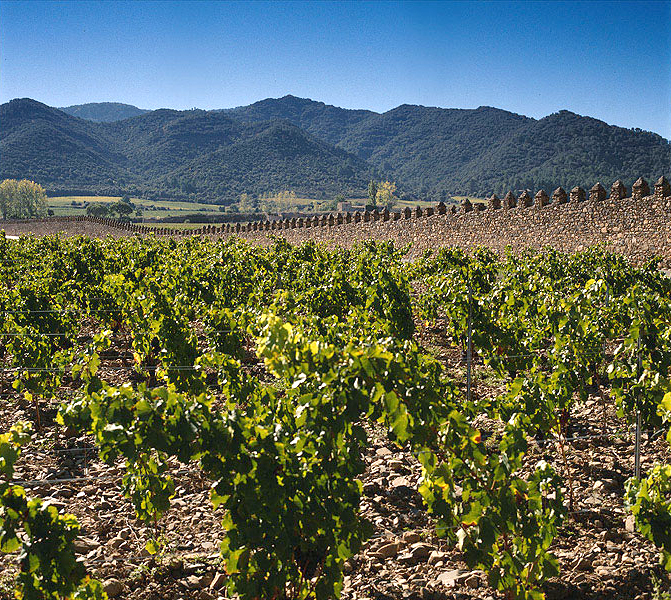
Grans Muralles.

In 1966 work started on the planting of imported grape varieties: at first Chardonnay and Cabernet Sauvignon and later on Merlot, Pinot noir, Riesling and Gewürztraminer. That same year, Miguel A. Torres married Waltraud Maczassek, a German artist, who has also collaborated in the sale of Torres wines on the German market. When Torres produced their first Riesling they named it in honour of Waltraud.

In 1975, Bodegas Torres began growing organic grapes for wine.

In 1991, after the death of Miguel Torres, the winery passed into the hands of his son Miguel A. Torres, the company’s current President and Managing Director.

== Estates ==
- The Mas La Plana vineyard, in Pacs del Penedès, within the borders of DO Penedès, which in the Middle Ages formed part of the fiefdom of the Count of Barcelona, is planted with Cabernet Sauvignon, with an average age of about 30 years. It is one of the first vineyards cultivated in Spain based on this variety of grape. The wine which bears the name of the estate, is produced from grapes grown here. Today, La Plana is recognised as one of the most prestigious red wines in the world, as claimed among others by Julian Jeffs in his book, “The Wines of Spain”.
- Located on the Cister Route, the medieval castle of Milmanda provides the name for another estate, from which a white wine of the same name comes. Milmanda is made using traditional methods, and fermented in barrels of new French oak. The Milmanda estate is located in the municipality of Vimbodí i Poblet, in DO Conca de Barberà, and consists of 15 hectares (37 acres; 150,000 m^{2}) of vineyard.
- At the Fransola estate the Sauvignon blanc vines share the space with plots planted with Parellada. The blend of these two varieties, although with a predominance of Sauvignon, is used to produce Fransola, through an elaboration that requires considerable care, given that part of the must is fermented in wooden barrels and the other part in stainless steel, before they are finally brought together.
- Located alongside the historical Cistercian monastery of Poblet, the wine Grans Muralles takes its name from the vineyard that used to surround the walls of the monastery. Historic varieties, now almost extinct, such as Garró or Samsó, share the land with rows of Garnacha tinta, Monastrell and Mazuelo.

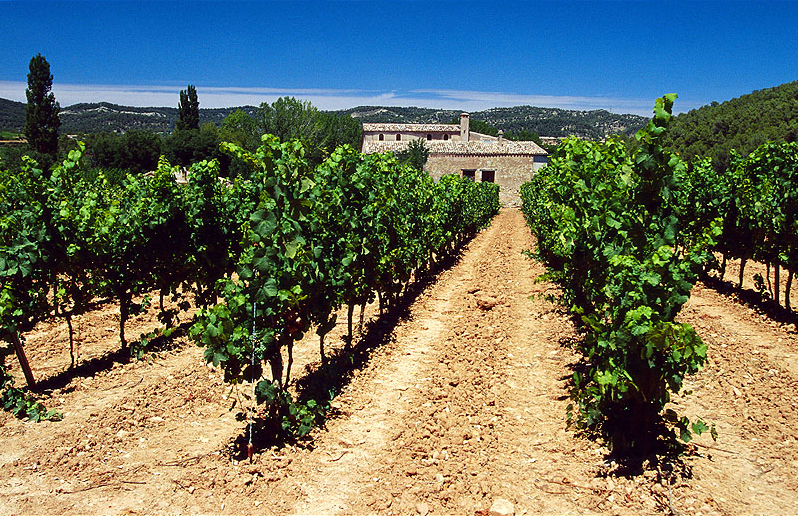
Fransola

- Owned by the Torres family since 1983, Mas Borras includes a vineyard of Pinot noir.
- Very small, covering only 4 hectares (10 acres; 40,469 m^{2}), production of the estate where Torres Reserva Real has its origins is extremely limited, producing barely more than 6,000 bottles a year. Furthermore, it is only made if the harvest has been particularly promising.

== Awards ==
- European Winery of the Year, by the American magazine Wine Enthusiast (2006)
- Wine Personality of the Year for Innovation, by the English magazine Wine International (2005)
- Principe Felipe Prize for Business Excellence (2004)
- Miguel A. Torres named Man of the year, by the British magazine Decanter(2002).
- Bodega Miguel Torres named Winery of the Year, in Guía de Vinos Gourmet (Gourmet Wines Guide) (2000).
- Wine Spectator Prize for the Most Important Winery of the Year (2000).
