= Miguel A. Torres =

Spanish winemaker, author and businessman

- Born: 1941 (age 84–85)
- Education: University of Barcelona
- Occupations: Winemaker, author, businessman
- Known for: President of Bodegas Torres
- Spouse: Waltraud Maczassek
- Father: Miquel Torres i Carbo
- Awards: Grand Cross of the Civil Order of Agricultural Merit

Miguel A. Torres (born 1941) is a Spanish winemaker, author and businessman. He is the owner, president and managing director of Bodegas Torres, and is a member of the fourth generation of this family business. He also manages the company’s vineyards in Chile and collaborates with his sister Marimar Torres in California. Additionally, Torres is the co-founder of the International Wineries Climate Association (IWCA).

== Early life ==
In 1957, he started his degree in Chemical Sciences at the University of Barcelona, two years later transferring to the University of Dijon (Bourgogne), where he specialised in oenology and viticulture.

In 1962, he joined the family business, of which he is currently President and Managing Director. Five years after joining the company he married Waltraud Maczassek, a painter and fine arts graduate, who from the very first has collaborated with the company in sales management on the German market. In 1982-1983 he extended his viticulture and oenology studies at the University of Montpellier (France), having taken a sabbatical year.

== Publications ==
Miguel A. Torres has published various books about the world of wine. His first book, Viñas y Vinos, (Vineyards and Wines) is currently in its fourth edition in Spanish, revised and updated by Plaza y Janes in 1993 and translated into Catalan, French, English, German, Norwegian, Finnish and Japanese. This first effort was followed by Vino español, un incierto futuro (Spanish Wine, an Uncertain Future) (1979); Manual de los vinos de Cataluña (Manual of Catalan Wines) (1982); Los vinos de España (The Wines of Spain) (1983); Guía Folio de los Vinos de España (Guide sheet to Spanish Wines) (1985); and Els Vins del Penedès (Wines of the Penedès) (1987). Likewise he also edited Enciclopedia del Vino (Encyclopaedia of Wine) for the editorial Orbis.

=== Bibliography ===
- Viñas y vinos (Vineyards and Wines), Plaza & Janés Editores, 1996. ISBN 84-01-00984-7
- Els vins del Penedès (Wines of the Penedès), Nuevo Arte Thor, 1987. ISBN 84-7327-150-5
- Los vinos de España (The Wines of Spain), Ediciones Castell, 1983. ISBN 84-7489-209-0
- Vino español: un incierto futuro (Spanish Wine, an Uncertain Future), Editorial Blume, 1979. ISBN 978-84-7031-101-7
- Manual de los vinos de Cataluña (Manual of Catalan Wines) (1982)
- Guía Folio de los vinos de España (Guide Sheet to Spanish Wines) (1985)

== Awards ==
- 1996: Government of Chile awarded him the Bernardo O’Higgins Order, Grand Officier, in acknowledgement for services towards the improvement of relations between Chile and Spain, as well as contribution to vinicultural development in Chile
- 2002: Decanter selected him as “Decanter Man of the Year”
- 2005: "Personality of the Year" award by Wine International magazine
