= Juvé y Camps =

Wine producer

Juvé & Camps is a family-owned Cava producer, headquartered in Sant Sadurní d'Anoia, Catalonia. Juvé & Camps was founded in 1921 by Joan Juvé Baqués and his wife Teresa Camps Ferrer. The winery has 2700 acres of vineyards.

Similar Cava winery groups include Freixenet and Codorníu.

== Wine criticism ==
Robert Parker's Wine Advocate rated 91 points for the Juvé & Camps non-vintage brut sparkling rosé. Review aggregator site wine.com rates the Juvé y Camps non-vintage brut sparkling rosé at 4.1 on a 5-point scale; it is a single varietal pinot noir produced in the traditional method.

Review aggregator site wine.com rates the Juvé & Camps 2016 vintage brut nature gran reserva Cava at 4.3 on a 5-point scale.
