= Pott (rum) =

Brand of rum spirits

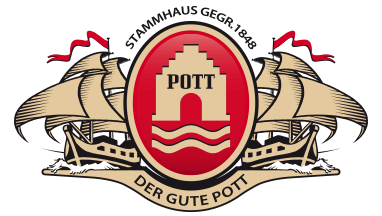
Logo

Pott also known as Der Gute Pott is a spirits brand for brown overseas rum of the company H. H. Pott Nachfgr. Vertriebsgesellschaft mbH Rumhandelshaus, in Flensburg. It has been a subsidiary of Henkell & Co. Sektkellerei, a member of the Oetker Group, since 2006.

== History ==
The brand name is derived from the founder, Hans Hinrich Pott, who founded the parent company as a distillery in 1848 in Flensburg. In marketing, the manufacturers claim that the synonym Der Gute is ascribed to him by various consumer circles. Accordingly, the brand Der gute Pott has been protected since 1923. After the Second World War, Pott became the market leader in the rum segment in Germany. Pott is available in the two varieties 40% vol. and 54% vol. alcohol.
