= Sant Sadurní d'Anoia =

- Municipality
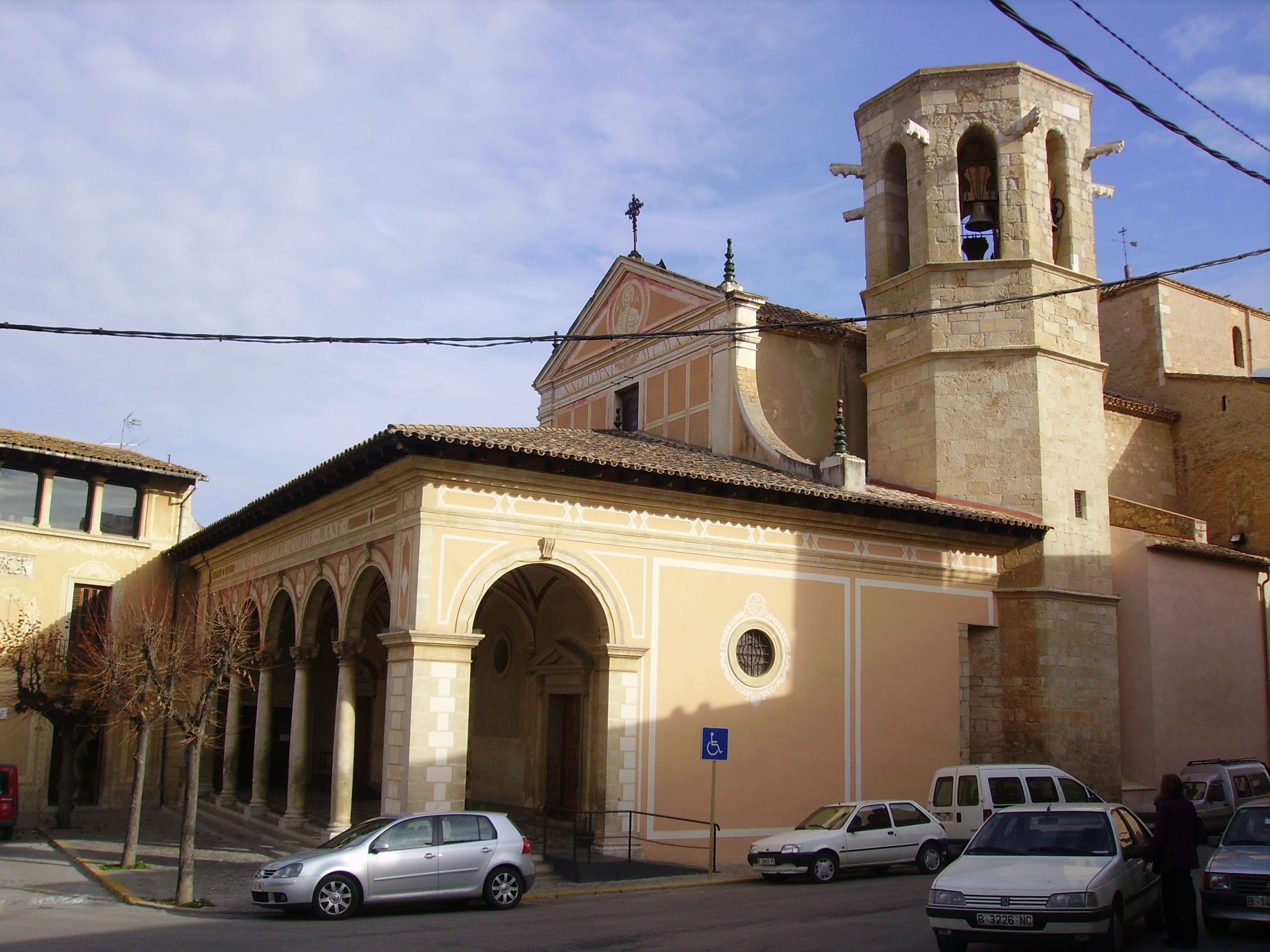
- Church

- Coat of arms

- Location in Catalonia Sant Sadurní d'Anoia (Spain)
- Coordinates: 41°25′34″N 1°47′6″E
- Country: Spain
- Community: Catalonia
- Province: Barcelona
- Comarca: Alt Penedès

Government
  - Mayor: Maria Rosell Medall (2015)

Area
  - Total: 19.0 km^{2} (7.3 sq mi)
- Elevation: 162 m (531 ft)

Population (2025-01-01)
  - Total: 12,911
  - Density: 680/km^{2} (1,760/sq mi)
- Demonym: Sadurninenc
- Postal code: 08770
- Website: santsadurni.cat

Sant Sadurní d'Anoia (Catalan pronunciation: [ˌsan səðuɾˈni ðəˈnɔjə]) is a municipality in the comarca of the Alt Penedès in Catalonia; and the centre of production of a sparkling wine known as cava. It is situated in the north-east of the Penedès Depression at the confluence of the Avernó river and the Anoia river. It is accessible by the AP-7 autopis and the Renfe railway line (R4) that connect Barcelona with Manresa and El Vendrell.

The noucentista buildings of the Codorníu cava house on the edge of the town were designed by Josep Puig i Cadafalch.

== History ==
Sant Sadurní has its origins in the old parish of Sant Sadurní de Subirats, documented in 1080. It was part of the barony of the finished castle of Subirats, in the hands of noble families, until, in 1493, it was incorporated into the Crown of Aragon. For centuries, Sant Sadurní de Subirats was little more than a set of houses aligned along the road between Tarragona and Barcelona. Its geographic situation allowed a greater development of the population with respect to the near parishes that formed the University of Subirats: Sant Pau d'Ordal, Sant Pere Lavern, and Sant Sadurní de Subirats.

In 1764, Sant Sadurní de Subirats achieved independence as a municipality. At this point, it adopted its present name, taken as a nickname from one of the rivers that cross it, the Anoia River. The history of Sant Sadurní was decisive in the late nineteenth century. With a strongly viticulture-oriented agriculture, from 1872 onwards, the first bottles of cava were made. In 1887, he was heavily affected by the phylloxera plague, but he was able to react strongly and became one of the leading places in the fight against the plague. The production of cava, which had started timidly shortly before the phylloxera, then took a definitive boost, becoming the most important production center.

== Village festivals ==
- "Festes dels Barris": for seven days from the first Thursday of Corpus. Every day the celebration of one of the seven classic districts that make up the town is celebrated: Ajuntament (city hall), Sant Antoni, Montserrat, Església (church), Diputació, Cavallers, and Raval. During the week of neighborhoods, at 2 noon throws a thunderstorm to symbolize the relief of one neighborhood to another. At dusk, there is a fire castle. And the next day, the Rengle is carried out, a parade through the streets of the neighborhood ending in the Parochial Church. The district council, in addition, creates a fault and the Barri Església guards the street with a carpet of flowers.
- "Les Fires i Festes": from 6 to 9 September to commemorate the harvest, and especially the "Phylloxera Festival", which is celebrated every evening on 8 September in Plaça de l ' Church, to remember the history of the plague, the battle between the peasants and the insect and the final victory. They are the main celebrations of the town. In the past, they were very important as a fair, as it was the time when the farmer took advantage of the vintage, bought horse and car, barrels and tools to work the land and make wine, etc. With the passage of time, the constant technological evolution has made the play part have gained the ground in the commercial part. On 6 September, before the opening, the typical meeting of Cushion Point is made. At 8 in the evening, there is the traditional opening of the fairs where the party is officially inaugurated, after the closing ceremony and the exhibition of the hawks from the country of the cava of Sant Sadurní. At night, the korrebars, summer carnival, concerts and party are held until dawn. On 7 September, there are children's shows, tennis and soccer tournaments. In the afternoon, children's and sardana shows are also performed. At 10 am and at midnight, a fire castle is thrown at the Parc del Gat Cendrer. Just after the fire castle begins the spread of phylloxera, it is a representation of the appearance of the phylloxera pest by making two phylloxis of fifteen phylloxerets that cross several streets to find themselves in the square of Era d'en Guineu, a square located in front of Can Guineu, a building that was the owner of Marc Mir and Capella one of the Seven Wise Men of Greece who fought for the fight against phylloxera. There also intervenes the great phylloxera.
- "La setmana del cava": second week of October with the acts of the cava brotherhood to crown the ambassadors of the cava. The town hall also organizes the "Cavatast" fair, where the best cavers are gathered to taste their best cavas.
- "Festa Major": on 29 November, to celebrate the patron saint of the town, Sant Sadurní.

== Subdivisions ==
Four outlying villages are included within the municipality of Sant Sadurní d'Anoia (populations as of 2005)

- Can Benet de la Prua (94)
- Can Catassús (124)
- Espiells (54), with its pre-Romanesque church of Sant Benet
- Monistrol d'Anoia (28)

== Sport ==
The town hosted the individual road race cycling event for the 1992 Summer Olympics.

=== Roller hockey ===
The city has a roller hockey team Club Esportiu Noia, one of the most important in Spain, and play in the main League OK Liga.

== Twin towns ==
- Cañete la Real, Spain

== Notable people ==
- Pau Bargalló Poch, roller hockey player, current world champion.
- Jordi Bargalló Poch, roller hockey player, world champion in 2007, 2009, 2011, 2013.
- Pedro Gil Gómez, roller hockey player.
- María Asunción Raventós, artist.
- Miquel Reina, author and designer.
- Àlex Moreno, footballer who plays for Aston Villa (Currently on loan to Nottingham Forest).
- Javier del Amor, Spanish former motorcycle racer.
- Dolors Montserrat, lawyer and politician.
