= Codorníu Winery =

Spanish producer of cava sparkling wine

Coordinates: 41.4336°N 1.7968°E

Codorníu, S.A.
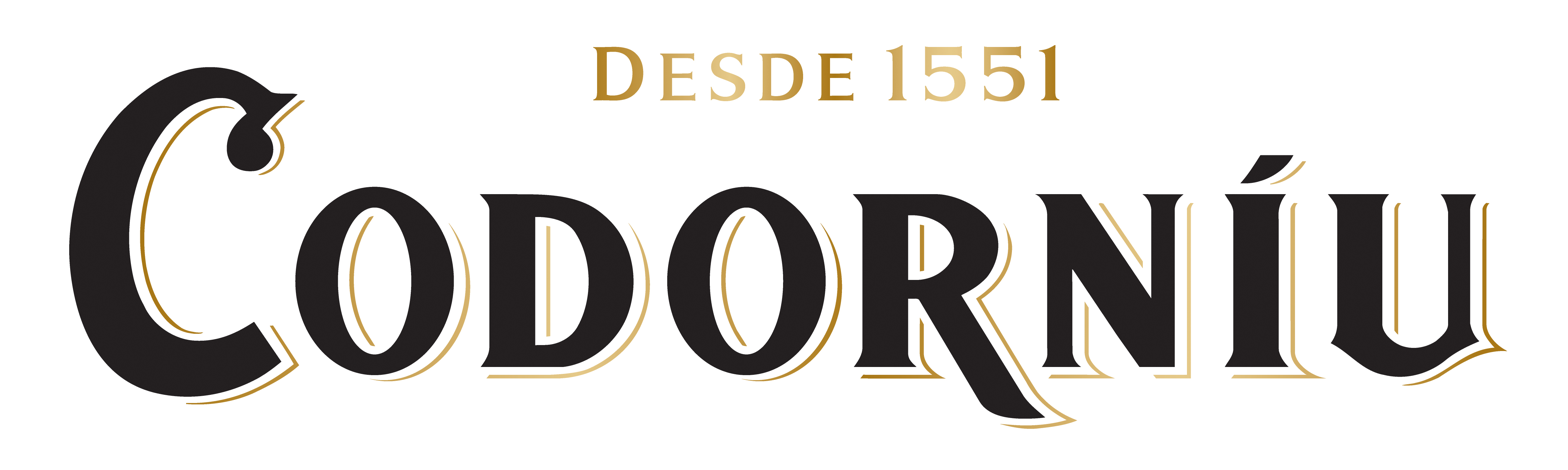

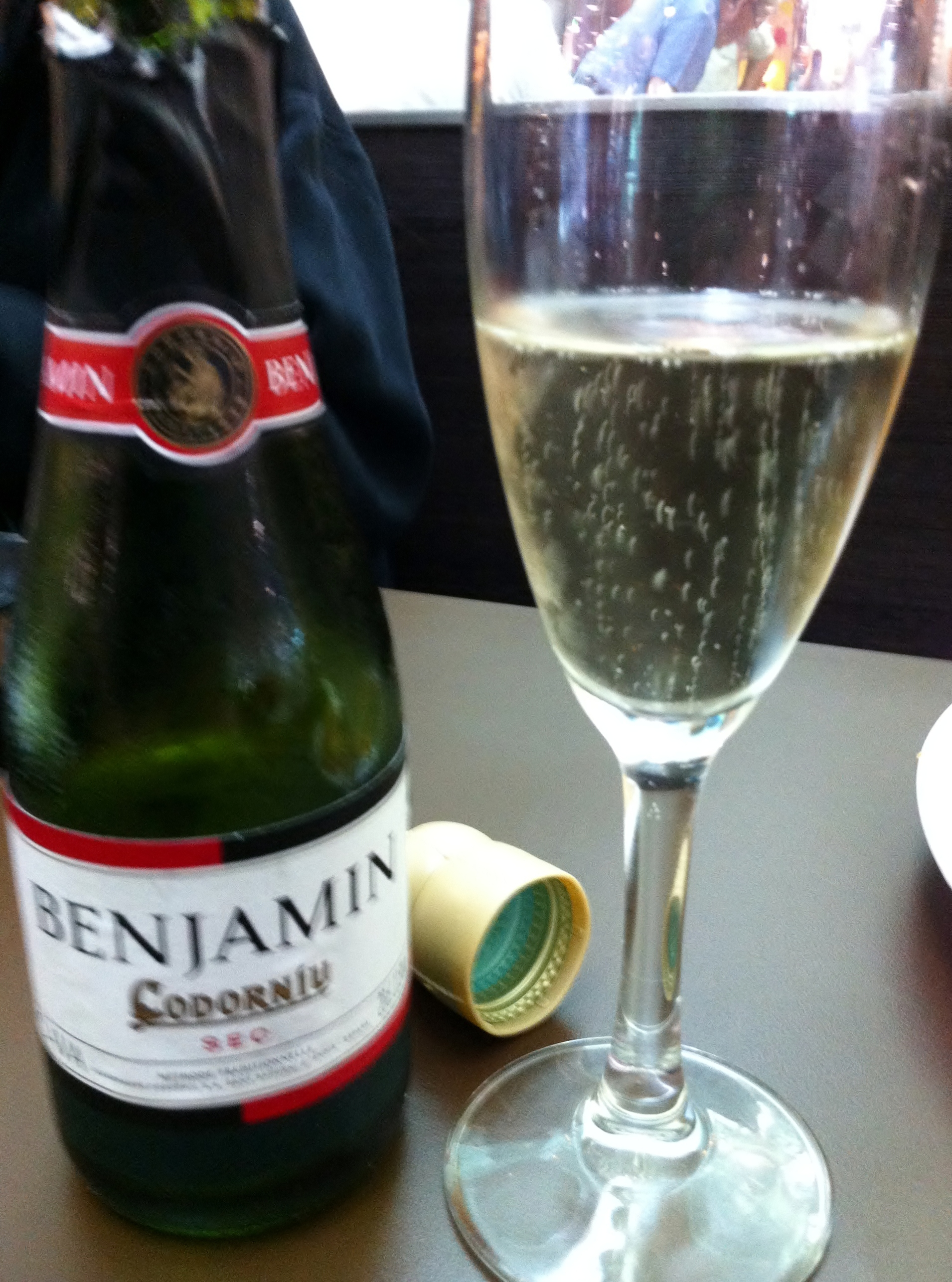
- Benjamin sec Cava made by Codorníu
- Type: Sociedad Anónima
- Industry: Winery
- Founded: Sant Sadurní d'Anoia, Spain (1551)
- Founder: Jaume Codorníu
- Headquarters: Haro (La Rioja), Spain
- Area served: Worldwide
- Key people: Alex Wagenberg, President; Sergio Fuster, CEO
- Products: Cava
- Website: codorniu.com

Codorníu (Catalan pronunciation: [kuðuɾˈniw]) is the oldest and second-largest producer of Cava, the Spanish traditional method sparkling wine. Founded in 1551 near Barcelona, it is one of the oldest companies in Spain and one of the oldest wineries worldwide.

== History ==
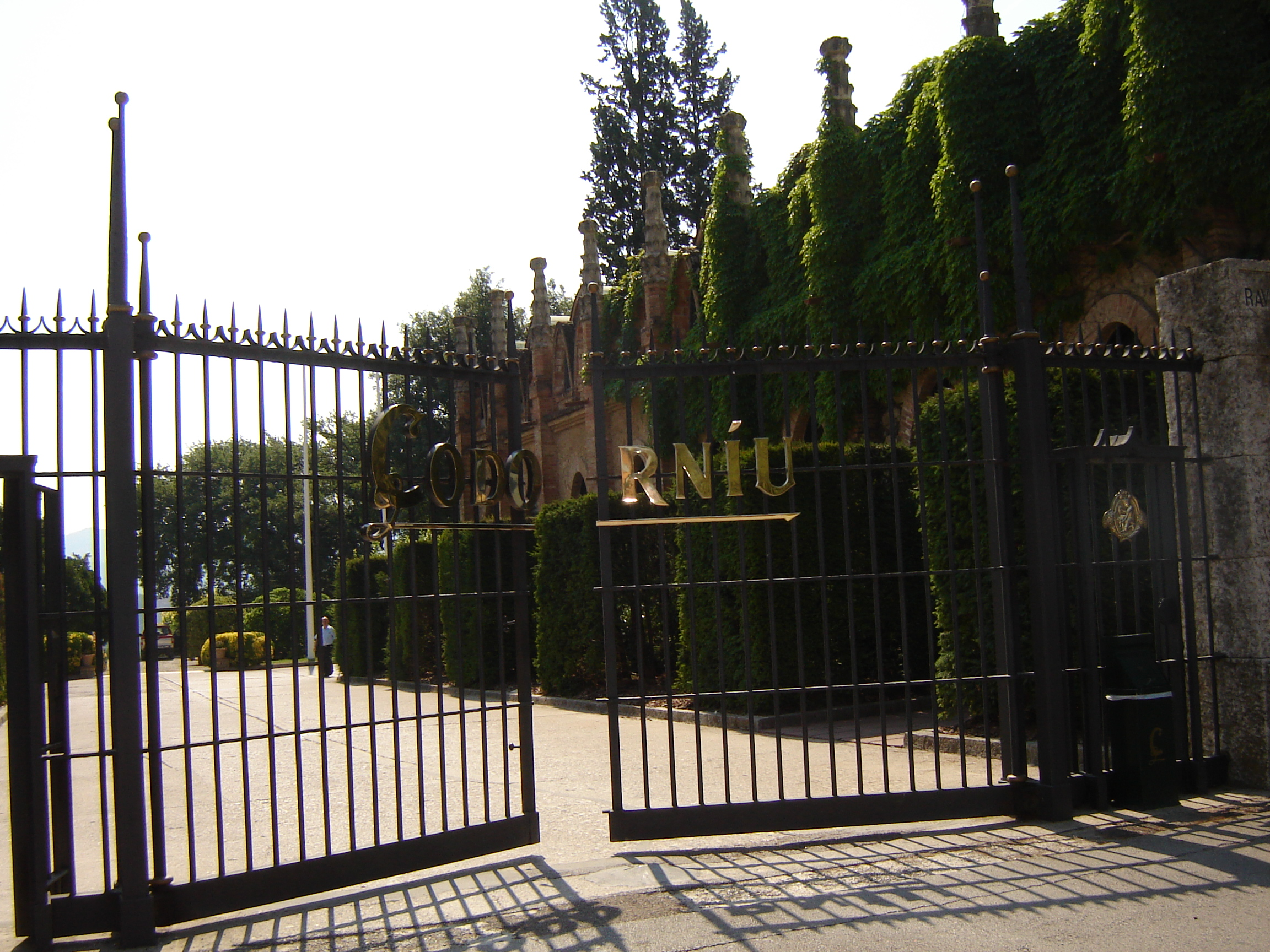
Gates leading to Codorníu winery

The Codorníu family’s wine business goes back to the middle of the 16th century. A document of that period states that the family had several machines and implements relating to the wine industry. In 1659 Anna Codorníu married Miquel Raventós and the families, each with a long wine tradition, were united. Years later, in 1872, Josep Raventós produced cava for the first time in Spain using the “traditional method” and established a completely new industry in the Alt Penedès region. The Codorníu cellars at Sant Sadurní d'Anoia were built on the orders of Manuel Raventós between the end of the 19th and the beginning of the 20th century (1895–1915). He chose the renowned Catalán architect Josep Puig i Cadafalch to design the facility. At that time Codorníu was producing about 100,000 bottles of cava per year, and the size of the new structure seemed overly grandiose. The location of the winery, then some distance from the road and the railway line, was also unusual for the time. Manuel Raventós, however, was insistent that the family winery should be close to the vineyard, as he was aware that such proximity would be the key to improving the quality of the wines. Nowadays, Codorníu continues to control the production process of all its cavas from vineyard planting to finished product. The winery has modern installations and equipment.

== Awards and honors ==
In 1976, the Codorníu cellars at Sant Sadurní d'Anoia were declared a "National Monument of Historical and Artistic Interest" by King Juan Carlos I.

== See also ==
- Spanish wine
- Cava
- List of oldest companies
