= Cava (Spanish wine) =

Spanish sparkling wine

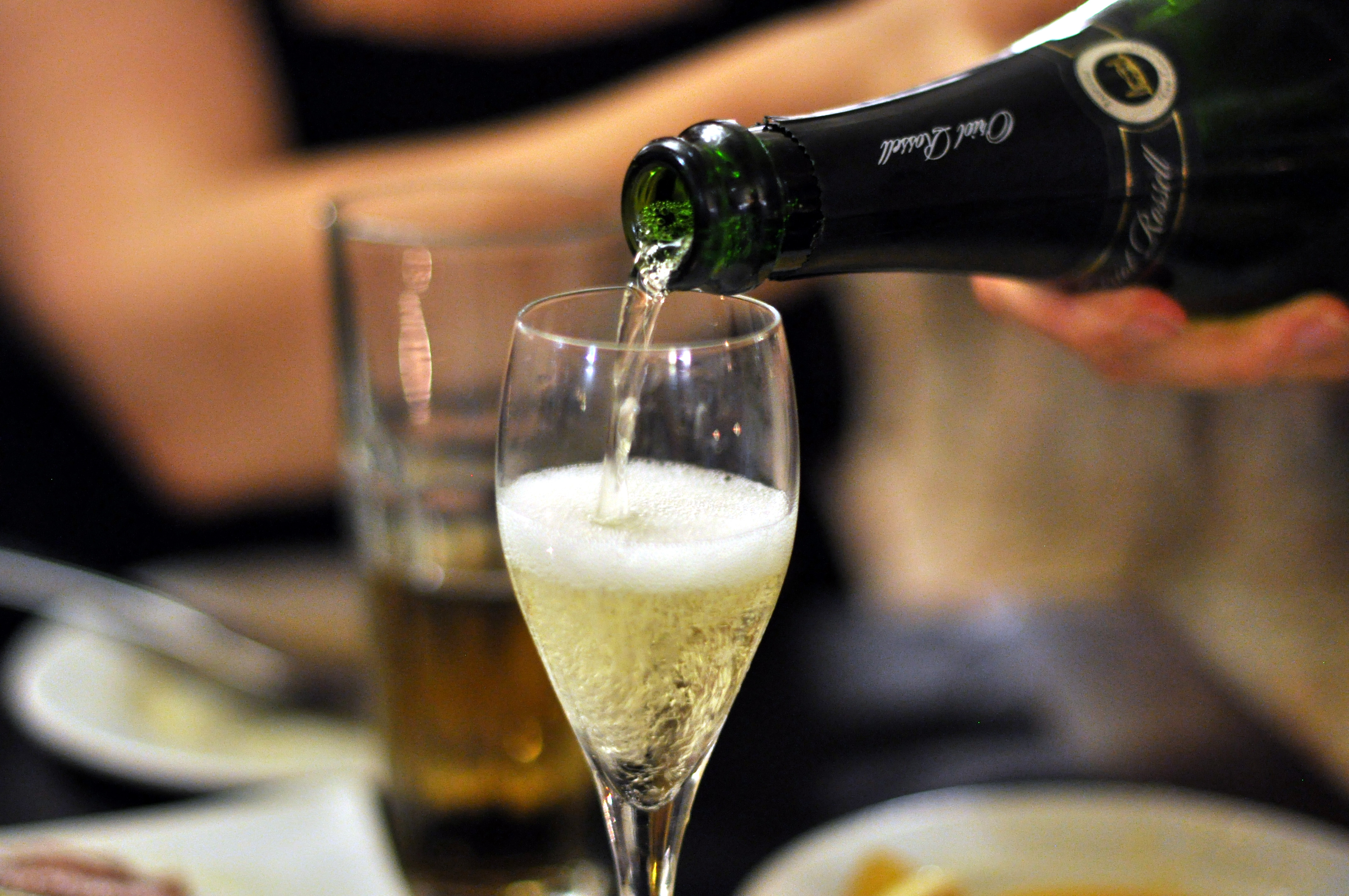
A glass of white cava

Cava (Catalan: [ˈkaβə], pl. caves; Spanish: [ˈkaβa], pl. cavas) is a sparkling wine of denominación de origen (DO) status from Spain made using méthode traditionnelle or the traditional champagne method.

The Macabeo, Parellada and Xarel·lo are the most popular and traditional grape varieties for producing cava. Chardonnay and Malvasia are also permitted. Authorized red grapes are Garnacha tinta, Monastrell, Trepat, and Pinot Noir. Only wines produced in the traditional method may be labelled "cava"; those produced by other processes may only be called "sparkling wines" (vi escumós).

About 95% of all cava is produced in the Penedès area in Catalonia, Spain, with the village of Sant Sadurní d'Anoia being home to many of the largest Catalan production houses. The two major producers are Codorníu and Freixenet. Cava is also produced in other villages in the provinces of Girona, Lleida, Tarragona, and Barcelona in Catalonia, Zaragoza in Aragon, Badajoz in Extremadura, La Rioja, Araba/Álava in the Basque Country, Navarra and València in the Valencian Community.

Marketing cava as "Spanish champagne" is no longer permitted under European Union law, since "champagne" has a protected geographical status (PGS). (Colloquially, however, cava is still called champán or champaña in Spanish, or champú in Argentinian Spanish, or xampany in Catalan.) Today, cava is defined by law as a "quality sparkling wine produced in a designated region" (Vino Espumoso de Calidad Producido en una Región Determinada, VECPRD).

The word champán in Spanish is not to be confused with achampañado, a colloquial term for cheaper non-traditional sparkling wines served by the bottle at bars or restaurants specializing in them.

== Name ==
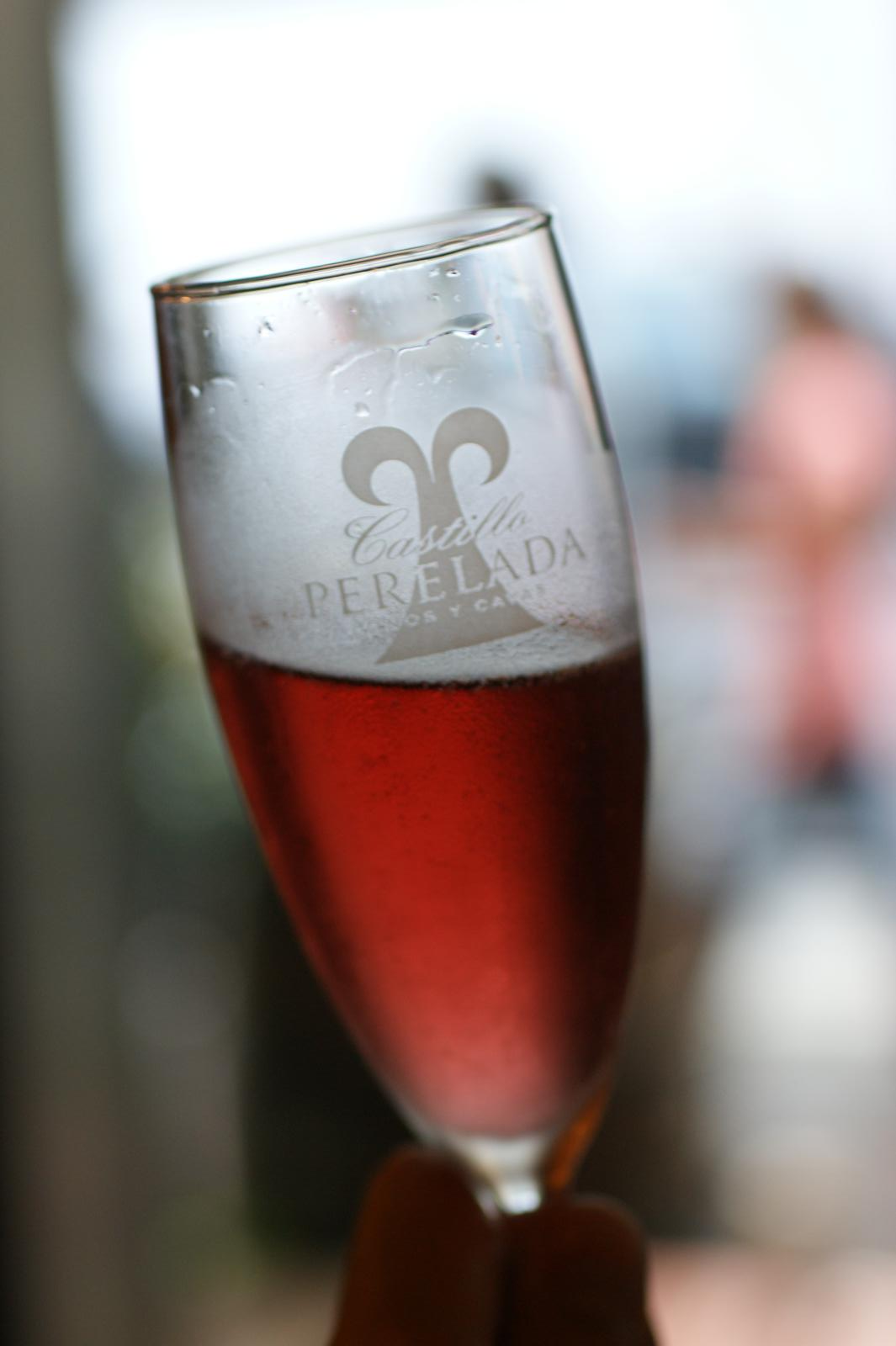
A rosado cava

The Spanish word cava (pl. cavas) means "cave" or "cellar", as caves were used in the early days of cava production for the preservation or aging of wine. Spanish winemakers officially adopted the term in 1970 to distinguish their product from French champagne.

== History ==
Catalan sparkling wine was first made as early as 1851, while the roots of the cava industry can be traced back to Josep Raventós's travels through Europe in the 1860s, where he was promoting the still wines of the Codorníu Winery. His visits to the Champagne wine region sparked an interest in the potential of a Spanish wine made using the same traditional method. He created his first sparkler in 1872, after the vineyards of Penedès were devastated by the phylloxera plague, and the predominantly red vines were being replaced by large numbers of vines producing white grapes.

Catalan cava producers pioneered a significant technological development in sparkling wine production with the invention of the gyropallet, a large mechanized device that replaced hand riddling, in which the lees are consolidated in the neck of the bottle prior to disgorgement and corking. In the 21st century it started its international expansion, being exported to several economies.

== Production ==
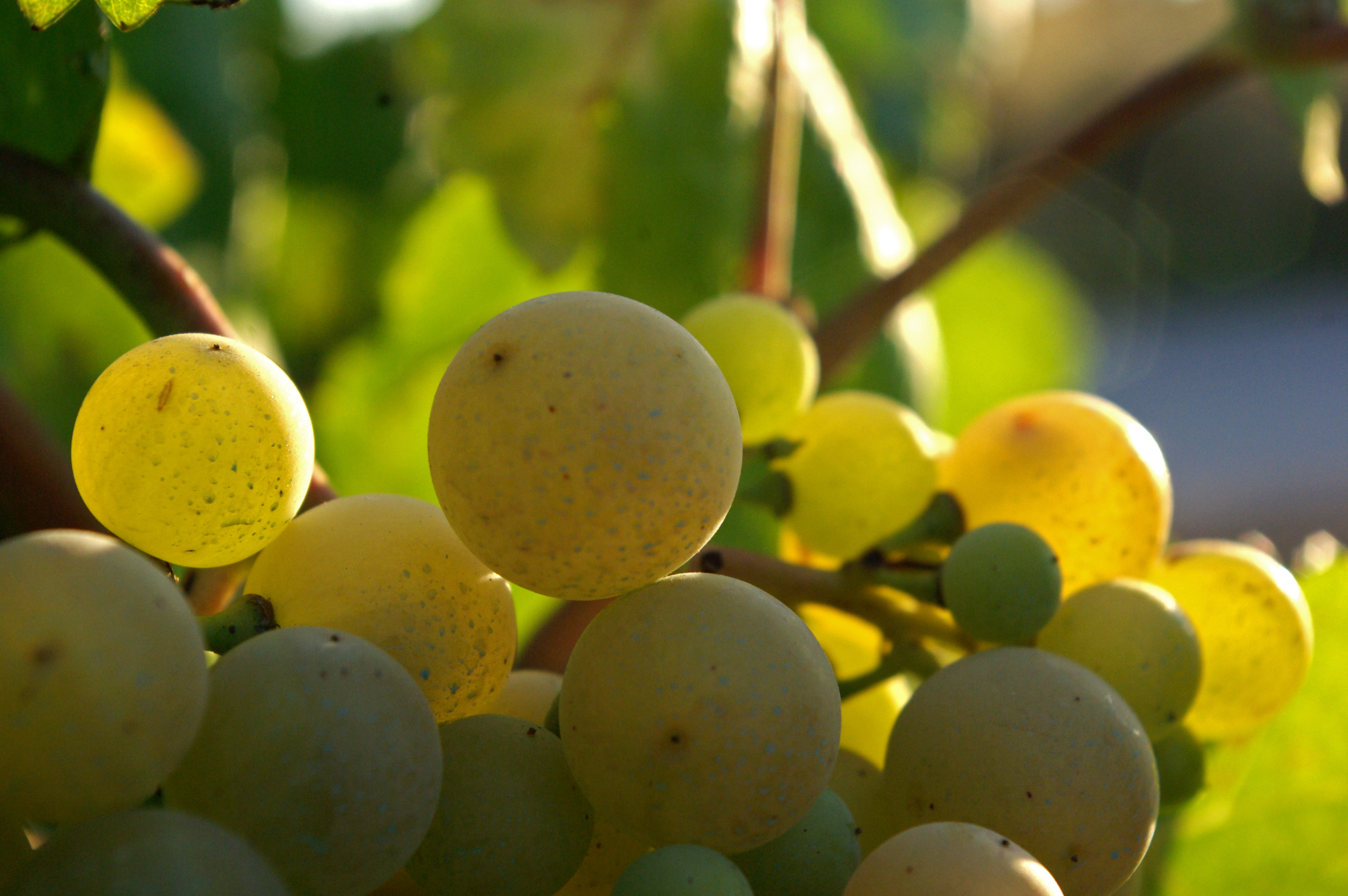
Xarel·lo, one of the principal grapes in cava

Spanish municipalities where cava production is allowed

According to Spanish law, cava may be produced in Catalonia. The Penedès wine region where most cava is produced is located in Catalonia. Cava is also produced in other villages in Aragon, Castile and León, Extremadura, la Rioja, Basque Country, Navarre and Valencia.

To make rosé cava, blending is not allowed. The wine must be made via saignée method using garnacha, pinot noir, trepat or monastrell. Besides macabeu, parellada, and xarel·lo, cava may also contain chardonnay, pinot noir and subirat grapes. The first cava to use chardonnay was produced in 1981. Like any other quality sparkling wine, cava is produced in varying levels of sweetness, ranging from the dryest, brut nature, through brut, brut reserve, seco, semiseco, to dulce, the sweetest.
