= Freixenet =

Catalan sparkling winery

Coordinates: 41°25′13″N 1°47′32″E

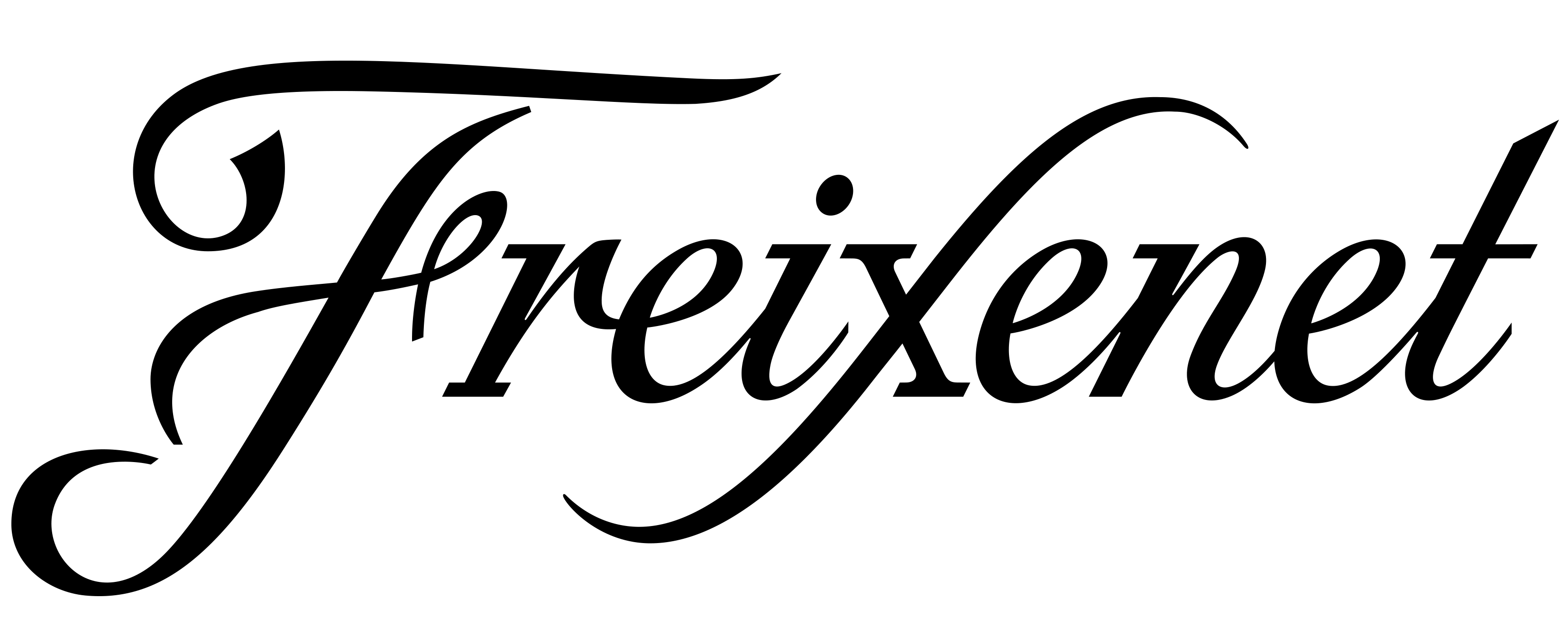
Freixenet logo

Freixenet (Catalan pronunciation: [fɾəʃəˈnɛt]) is a Spanish producer of cava and other sparkling and still wines, founded in 1914 in Sant Sadurní d'Anoia, in the province of Barcelona. It is the largest producer of traditional method sparkling wine worldwide, and the largest exporter of Cava. The company currently belongs to the German concern Henkell & Co..

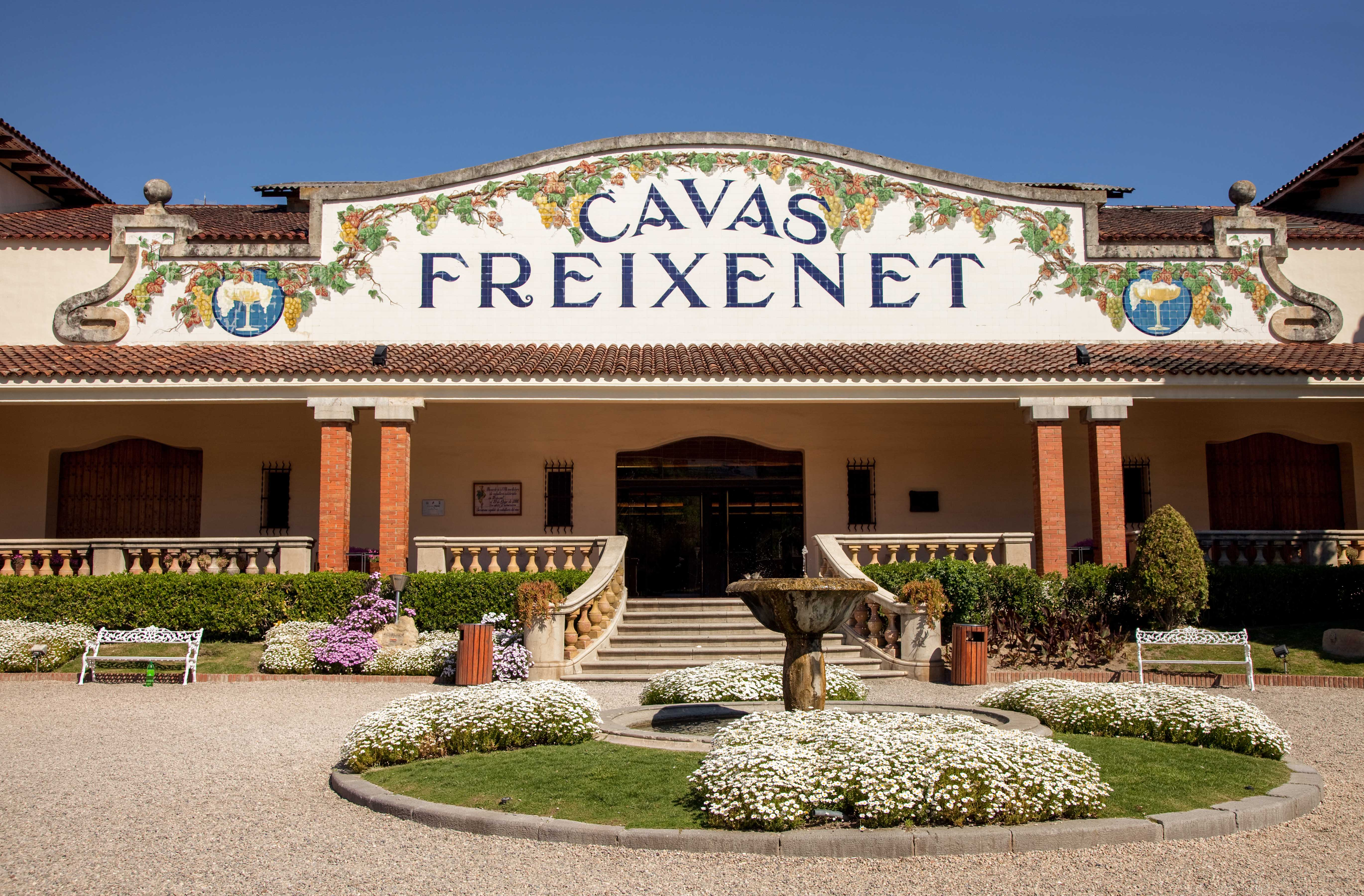
Freixenet headquarters

== History ==
The company was founded after the union of two families specialized in the wine market: the Ferrer family, owners of La Freixeneda since the 12th century, and the Sala family, founders of Casa Sala (1861). When Pedro Ferrer Bosch married Dolores Sala Vivé, the foundations of the company were laid. When Spanish wine production fell at the end of the 19th century, many companies became interested in the production of cava, beginning to bottle sparkling wines. Pedro and Dolores started bottling cava under the Freixenet brand from 1914 onwards.

During the Spanish Civil War the family lost the company, but recovered it again at the end of the war thanks to the drive of Dolores Sala and her daughter. In 1941 they managed to launch their best-selling product, the "Carta Nevada" cava. Under the control of José Ferrer, at the end of the 1950s Freixenet managed to improve the company's commercial trajectory until it became one of the main companies dedicated to cava. In 1974 Freixenet launched "Cordon Negro". Since the 1970s Freixenet began its expansion into international markets and in 1985 became the world leader in the cava market.

In the following decades Freixenet launches more modern and innovative products such as cava Elyssia in 2009, cava to drink on ice Freixenet ICE in 2016, Freixenet Prosecco DOC in 2017 or Freixenet Still Wines in 2021.

In 2018, the German group Henkell & Co. acquired a 50.67% majority stake in Freixenet.

In 2019, the Spanish-German alliance was renamed Henkell Freixenet, creating the world's leading sparkling wine group. In April 2024 the management communicated the intention to temporarily lay off more than 600 employees, as the amount of base wine for cava production has declined significantly due to the drought that has persisted for three vintages.

In 2026, Henkell acquired the remaining shares in Freixenet from the Ferrer and Bonet families.

== Marketing ==
For many years Freixenet's annual Christmas television commercial featured world-famous celebrities including Liza Minnelli (1977), Raquel Welch (1985), Paul Newman (1989), Antonio Banderas and Sharon Stone (1992), Kim Basinger (1993), Penélope Cruz (1994 and 2001), Alejandro Sanz (1998), Pierce Brosnan (2004), Demi Moore (2005) and Shakira (2010).

In 2018 Freixenet stopped having famous people in its commercials and changed its advertising strategy with the aim of deseasonalizing the consumption of cava and consolidating the international positioning of the brand focused on the celebration of life's small and big moments, as well as associating the drink with the Mediterranean lifestyle.

Freixenet is the main sponsor of the roller hockey (quad) team, Club Esportiu Noia, that usually competes in the main Spanish league and also European Competitions:CERH European League and CERS Cup. Due to this sponsorship agreement the name of the team is CE NOIA Freixenet.

Freixenet is also the official cava of the MotoGP World Championship since 2003.

== See also ==
- Gloria Ferrer Caves & Vineyards, Freixenet's California based winery.
