= List of extreme temperatures in France =

== High temperature ==
Map of the highest temperatures recorded in metropolitan France between 1975 and August 27, 2026

Temperature	Location	Date Recorded	References
46.0 °C (114.8 °F)	Verargues, Hérault	28 June 2019	
45.9 °C (114.6 °F)	Gallargues-le-Montueux, Gard	28 June 2019	
45.4 °C (113.7 °F)	Villevieille, Gard	28 June 2019	
45.1 °C (113.2 °F)	Marsillargues, Hérault	28 June 2019	
44.6 °C (112.3 °F)	Saint-Chamas, Bouches-du-Rhône	28 June 2019	
44.5 °C (112.1 °F)	Varages, Var	28 June 2019	
44.4 °C (111.9 °F)	Nîmes, Gard	28 June 2019	
44.4 °C (111.9 °F)	Peyrolles-en-Provence, Bouches-du-Rhône	28 June 2019	
44.3 °C (111.7 °F)	Carpentras, Vaucluse	28 June 2019	
44.3 °C (111.7 °F)	Moules-et-Baucels, Hérault	28 June 2019	
44.3 °C (111.7 °F)	Vinon-sur-Verdon, Var	28 June 2019	
44.3 °C (111.7 °F)	Istres, Bouches-du-Rhône	28 June 2019	
44.3 °C (111.7 °F)	Pissos, Landes	23 June 2026	
44.1 °C (111.4 °F)	Conqueyrac, Gard	12 August 2003	
44.1 °C (111.4 °F)	Saint-Christol-lès-Alès, Gard	12 August 2003	
44 °C (111 °F)	Montpellier airport Frejorgue, Hérault	28 June 2019	
44 °C (111 °F)	Toulouse, Haute-Garonne	8 August 1923	
43.9 °C (111.0 °F)	Brignoles, Var	28 June 2019	
43.9 °C (111.0 °F)	Entrecasteaux, Var	7 July 1982	
43.7 °C (110.7 °F)	Saint-Andiol, Bouches-du-Rhône	4 August 2003	
43.7 °C (110.7 °F)	Le Blanc, Indre	1 August 1947	
43.5 °C (110.3 °F)	Uzès, Gard	28 June 2019	
43.4 °C (110.1 °F)	Salon de Provence, Bouches-du-Rhône	28 June 2019	
43.4 °C (110.1 °F)	Sartène, Corse-du-Sud	23 July 2009	
43.3 °C (109.9 °F)	Châteaumeillant, Cher	23 June 2026	
43.2 °C (109.8 °F)	Broût-Vernet, Allier	13 July 1983	
43.1 °C (109.6 °F)	Chusclan, Gard	12 August 2003	
43.1 °C (109.6 °F)	Decize, Nièvre	11 August 2003	
43 °C (109 °F)	Cazals, Lot	4 August 2003	
43 °C (109 °F)	Léon, Landes	30 June 1968	
42.8 °C (109.0 °F)	Avignon, Vaucluse	28 June 2019	
42.8 °C (109.0 °F)	Montpellier, Hérault	19 July 1904	
42.7 °C (108.9 °F)	Figari, Corse-du-Sud	4 August 2017	
42.7 °C (108.9 °F)	Le Cannet, Alpes-Maritimes	12 July 1982	
42.6 °C (108.7 °F)	Orange, Vaucluse	12 August 2003	
42.5 °C (108.5 °F)	Mont-de-Marsan, Landes	1 August 1947	
42.5 °C (108.5 °F)	Saint-Raphaël, Var	30 July 1983	
42.4 °C (108.3 °F)	Paris, Île-de-France	25 July 2019	
42.4 °C (108.3 °F)	Perpignan, Pyrénées-Orientales	28 June 2019	
42.3 °C (108.1 °F)	Grospierres, Ardèche	27 June 2019	
42.3 °C (108.1 °F)	Hyères, Var	10 July 1982	
42.3 °C (108.1 °F)	Montgivray, Indre	18 August 2012	
42.2 °C (108.0 °F)	Le Luc, Var	5 August 2017	
42.2 °C (108.0 °F)	Château-Arnoux-Saint-Auban, Alpes-de-Haute-Provence	28 June 2019	
42.2 °C (108.0 °F)	Châteauroux, Indre	9 August 1923	
42.1 °C (107.8 °F)	Montclus, Gard	21 August 2012	
42 °C (108 °F)	Aix en Provence, Bouches-du-Rhône	28 June 2019	
42 °C (108 °F)	Paray-le-Monial, Saône-et-Loire	27 July 1983	
42 °C (108 °F)	Bergerac, Dordogne	27 July 1947	
42 °C (108 °F)	Bergerac, Dordogne	12 July 1949	
42 °C (108 °F)	Grospierres	27 June 2019	
42 °C (108 °F)	Ponte Leccia, Haute-Corse	27 July 1998	
41.9 °C (107.4 °F)	Sisteron, Alpes-de-Haute-Provence	28 June 2019	
41.9 °C (107.4 °F)	Saint-Julien-de-Peyrolas, Gard	27 June 2019	
41.9 °C (107.4 °F)	Bordeaux, Gironde	23 June 2026	
41.8 °C (107.2 °F)	Gourdon, Lot	4 August 2003	
41.8 °C (107.2 °F)	Montauban, Tarn-et-Garonne	4 August 2003	
41.8 °C (107.2 °F)	Figari, Corse-du-Sud	3 August 2017	
41.6 °C (106.9 °F)	Carpentras, Vaucluse	26 July 1983	
41.6 °C (106.9 °F)	Chaumont, Haute-Marne	28 July 1921	
41.5 °C (106.7 °F)	Châtillon-sur-Seine, Côte-d'Or	19 August 2012	
41.5 °C (106.7 °F)	Aubenas, Ardèche	27 June 2019	
41.4 °C (106.5 °F)	Laragne-Montéglin, Hautes Alpes	28 June 2019	
41.4 °C (106.5 °F)	Digne les Bains, Alpes-de-Haute-Provence	28 June 2019	
41.4 °C (106.5 °F)	Angoulême, Charente	8 August 1923	

== Low Temperatures ==
Temperature	Location	Date Recorded
−41.0 °C (−41.8 °F)	Mouthe, Doubs	17 January 1985
−39.5 °C (−39.1 °F)	Combsfroide, Doubs	17 January 1985
−39.0 °C (−38.2 °F)	Chapelle-des-Bois, Doubs	17 January 1985
−37.0 °C (−34.6 °F)	Saint-Dié, Vosges	10 December 1879
−36.7 °C (−34.1 °F)	Mouthe, Doubs	13 January 1968
−35.0 °C (−31.0 °F)	Gelles, Puy-de-Dôme	14 February 1929
−35.0 °C (−31.0 °F)	Mouthe, Doubs	3 January 1971
−33.0 °C (−27.4 °F)	Langres, Haute-Marne	10 December 1879
−32.0 °C (−25.6 °F)	Pontarlier, Doubs	?
−32.0 °C (−25.6 °F)	Le Russey, Doubs	?
−31.9 °C (−25.4 °F)	Pierrefontaine-les-Varans, Doubs	?
−31.0 °C (−23.8 °F)	Granges-Sainte-Marie, Doubs	2 January 1971
−31.0 °C (−23.8 °F)	Lempdes, Puy-de-Dôme	14 February 1929
−31.0 °C (−23.8 °F)	Chamonix, Haute-Savoie	1 January 1905
−30.0 °C (−22.0 °F)	Morbier, Jura	13 January 1968
−30.0 °C (−22.0 °F)	Nancy, Meurthe-et-Moselle	8 December 1879
−28.0 °C (−18.4 °F)	Mont Aigoual, Gard	10 February 1956
−28.0 °C (−18.4 °F)	Orléans, Loiret	10 December 1879
−27.1 °C (−16.8 °F)	Grenoble, Rhône-Alpes	3 January 1971
−26.9 °C (−16.4 °F)	Ambérieu-en-Bugey, Ain	23 January 1963
−26.9 °C (−16.4 °F)	Vichy, Allier	5 January 1971
−26.6 °C (−15.9 °F)	Commercy, Meuse	8 December 1879
−26.0 °C (−14.8 °F)	Épinal, Vosges	8 December 1879
−26.0 °C (−14.8 °F)	Gien, Loiret	9 December 1879
−25.9 °C (−14.6 °F)	Luxeuil-les-Bains, Haute-Saône	16 January 1966
−25.8 °C (−14.4 °F)	Limoges, Haute-Vienne	18 January 1893
−25.8 °C (−14.4 °F)	Saint-Maur-des-Fossés, Val-de-Marne	10 December 1879
−25.6 °C (−14.1 °F)	Saint-Étienne, Loire	4 January 1971
−25.4 °C (−13.7 °F)	Luxeuil-les-Bains, Haute-Saône	2 February 1954
−25.2 °C (−13.4 °F)	Luxeuil-les-Bains, Haute-Saône	13 January 1968
−25.2 °C (−13.4 °F)	Romilly-sur-Seine, Aube	6 January 1971
−25.2 °C (−13.4 °F)	Troyes, Aube	6 January 1971
−25.0 °C (−13.0 °F)	Nevers, Nièvre	9 January 1985
−25.0 °C (−13.0 °F)	Troyes, Aube	21 February 1956
−24.8 °C (−12.6 °F)	Nancy, Meurthe-et-Moselle	21 February 1956
−24.0 °C (−11.2 °F)	Gillancourt, Haute-Marne	18 January 1893
−24.0 °C (−11.2 °F)	Vichy, Allier	5 February 1963
−23.9 °C (−11.0 °F)	Paris Montsouris	10 December 1879
−23.7 °C (−10.7 °F)	Besançon, Doubs	9 January 1985
−23.2 °C (−9.8 °F)	Strasbourg, Bas-Rhin	2 January 1971

== Overseas departments and regions extremes ==
Region	Extreme Maximum		Extreme Minimum	
Region	Temperature	Location	Temperature	Location
Guadeloupe	35.8 °C (96.4 °F)	Vieux-Habitants	12.2 °C (54.0 °F)	Saint-Claude
Guyane	37 °C (99 °F)	Maripasoula	5 °C (41 °F)	Saül
Martinique	37 °C (99 °F)	Saint-Pierre	12 °C (54 °F)	Fonds-Saint-Denis
Mayotte	37.8 °C (100.0 °F)	Dzaoudzi	13.9 °C (57.0 °F)	Dzaoudzi
Réunion	36.9 °C (98.4 °F)	Le Port	−4 °C (25 °F)	Plaine des Cafres

== Overseas collectivities ==
Collectivity	Extreme Maximum		Extreme Minimum	
Collectivity	Temperature	Location	Temperature	Location
French Polynesia	37.8 °C (100.0 °F)	Atuona	8 °C (46 °F)	Tubuai
New Caledonia	39.9 °C (103.8 °F)	Bouloupari	2.3 °C (36.1 °F)	Bourail
Saint Barthélemy	35.2 °C (95.4 °F)	Gustavia	15.6 °C (60.1 °F)	Gustavia
Saint Martin	36.4 °C (97.5 °F)	Orléans	17 °C (63 °F)	Orléans
Saint Pierre and Miquelon	28.4 °C (83.1 °F)	Saint-Pierre	−22.5 °C (−8.5 °F)	Saint-Pierre
Wallis and Futuna	35.8 °C (96.4 °F)	Maopoopo, Futuna	17.5 °C (63.5 °F)	Hihifo, Wallis

== Top 10 warmest days in Paris ==
This list consists of the 10 warmest days ever recorded in Paris, the capital city of France.

No.	Temp.	Date
1	41.9°C	25 July 2019
2	40.3°C	19 July 2022
3	40.0°C	12 August 2003
4	39.9°C	6 August 2003
5	39.8°C	24 July 2019
5	39.8°C	25 June 2026
7	39.6°C	11 August 2003
8	39.5°C	31 July 2020
9	39.2°C	10 August 2003
9	39.2°C	28 July 1947
