= Saint-Alexandre =

Saint-Alexandre may refer to:

- Saint-Alexandre, Gard
- Saint-Alexandre, Quebec
