= Château d'Aiguèze =

Castle in Aiguèze, Gard, France

Coordinates: 44°18′11″N 4°33′24″E

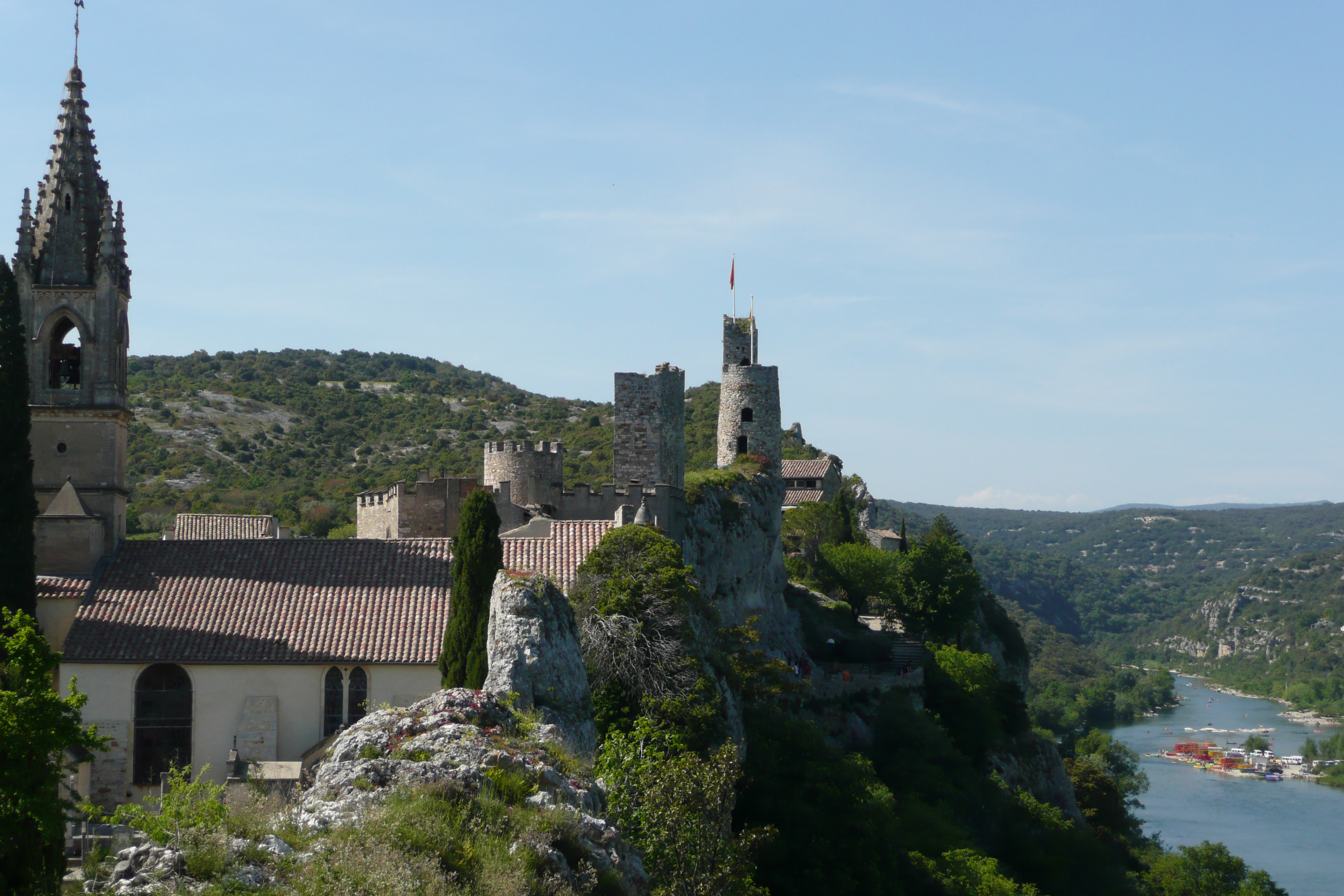
Château d'Aiguèze

Château d'Aiguèze is a castle in Aiguèze, Gard, France. It was built on the top of a cliff over the Ardèche river.
