= Saint-Nazaire, Gard =

Saint-Nazaire
- Commune
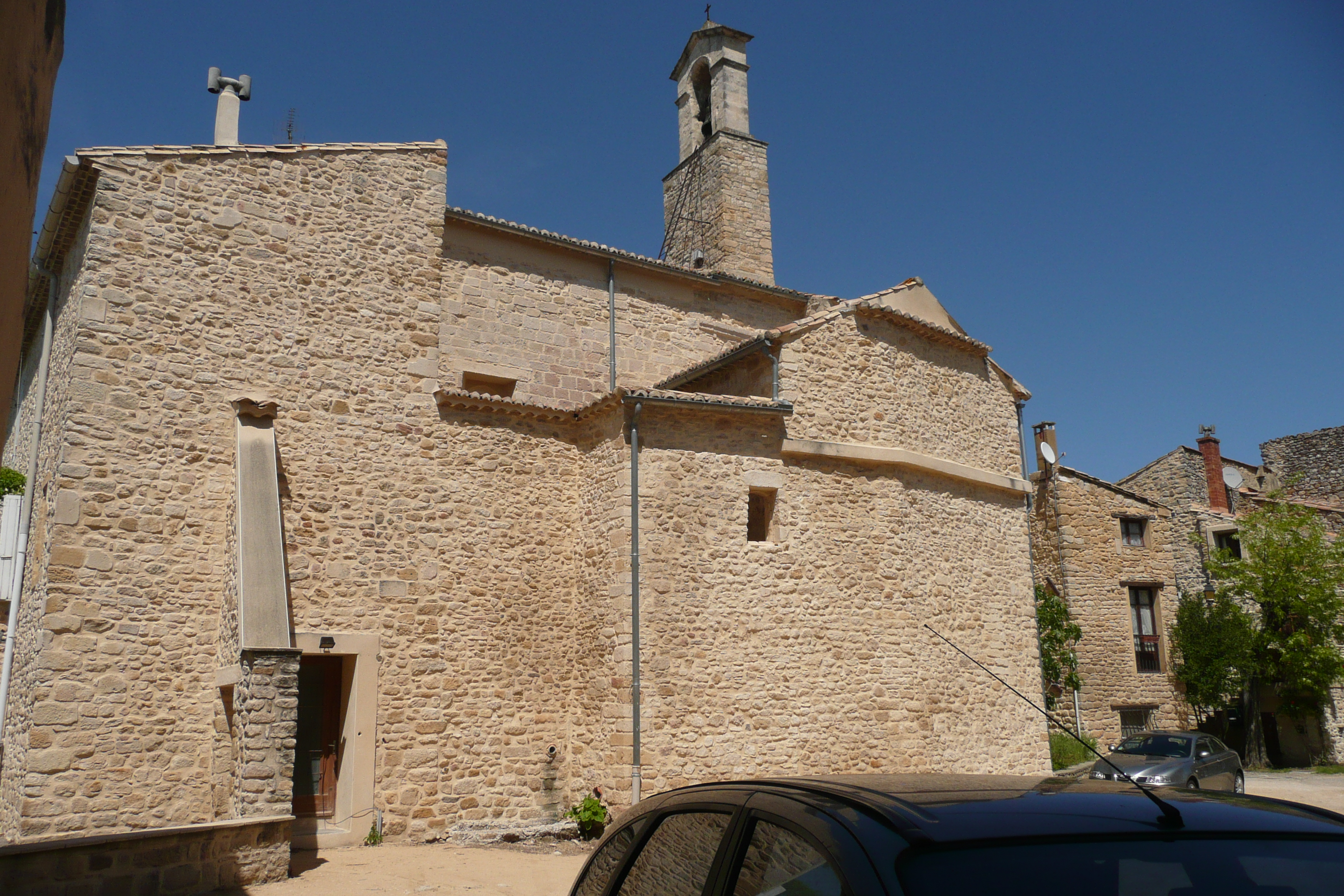
- The church in Saint-Nazaire

- Coat of arms
- Location of Saint-Nazaire
- Location within France Location within Occitanie
- Coordinates: 44°11′55″N 4°37′30″E
- Country: France
- Region: Occitania
- Department: Gard
- Arrondissement: Nîmes
- Canton: Pont-Saint-Esprit
- Intercommunality: CA Gard Rhodanien

Government
  - Mayor (2020–2026): Gérald Missour
- Area^{1}: 6.68 km^{2} (2.58 sq mi)
- Elevation: 95 m (312 ft)
- Highest elevation: 224 m (735 ft)
- Lowest elevation: 58 m (190 ft)
- Population (2023): 1,312
  - Density: 196/km^{2} (509/sq mi)
- Time zone: UTC+01:00 (CET)
  - Summer (DST): UTC+02:00 (CEST)
- INSEE/Postal code: 30288 /30200
- ^{1} French Land Register data, which excludes lakes, ponds, glaciers > 1 km^{2} (0.386 sq mi or 247 acres) and river estuaries.

Saint-Nazaire (French: [sɛ̃ nazɛːʁ]; Provençal: Sent Nazari) is a commune in the Gard department in southern France.

== Population ==
Historical population
Year	Pop.	±% p.a.
1968	864	—
1975	837	−0.45%
1982	979	+2.26%
1990	1,008	+0.37%
1999	1,118	+1.16%
2007	1,153	+0.39%
2012	1,203	+0.85%
2017	1,229	+0.43%
2023	1,312	+1.10%
Source: INSEE

== See also ==
- Communes of the Gard department
