= Laval-Saint-Roman =

- Commune
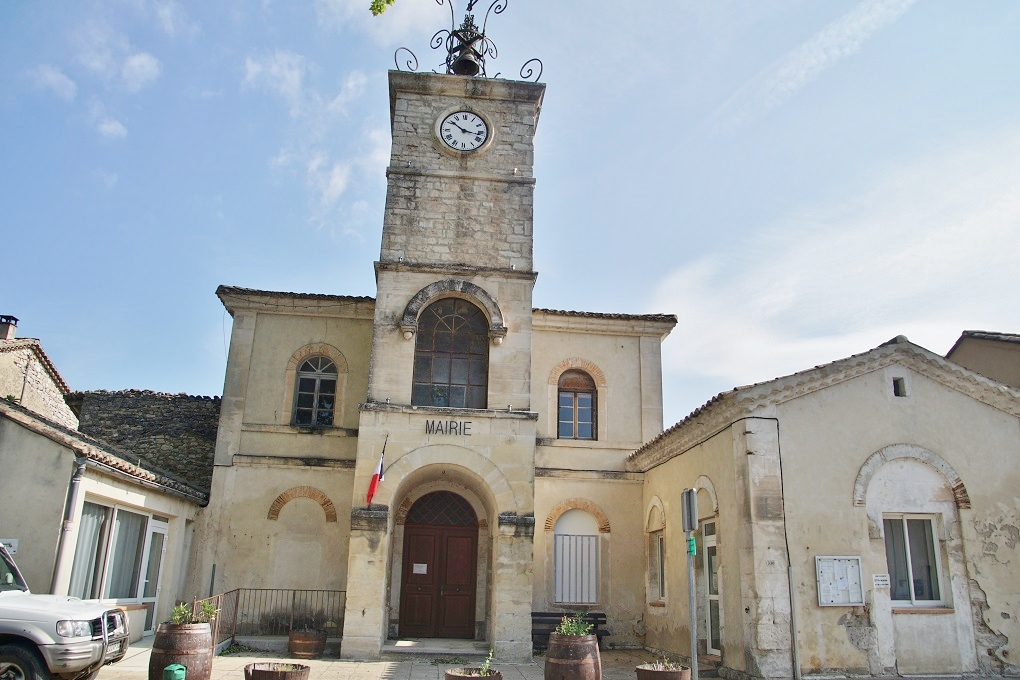
- Town hall
- Location of Laval-Saint-Roman
- Location within France Location within Occitanie
- Coordinates: 44°17′58″N 4°30′19″E
- Country: France
- Region: Occitania
- Department: Gard
- Arrondissement: Nîmes
- Canton: Pont-Saint-Esprit
- Intercommunality: CA Gard Rhodanien

Government
  - Mayor (2020–2026): Muriel Roy-Cros
- Area^{1}: 10.5 km^{2} (4.1 sq mi)
- Elevation: 134 m (440 ft)
- Highest elevation: 380 m (1,250 ft)
- Lowest elevation: 81 m (266 ft)
- Population (2023): 213
  - Density: 20.3/km^{2} (52.5/sq mi)
- Time zone: UTC+01:00 (CET)
  - Summer (DST): UTC+02:00 (CEST)
- INSEE/Postal code: 30143 /30760
- ^{1} French Land Register data, which excludes lakes, ponds, glaciers > 1 km^{2} (0.386 sq mi or 247 acres) and river estuaries.

Laval-Saint-Roman (French pronunciation: [laval sɛ̃ ʁɔmɑ̃]; Occitan: La Vau de Sant Roman) is a commune in the Gard department in southern France.

== Population ==
Historical population
Year	Pop.	±% p.a.
1968	127	—
1975	134	+0.77%
1982	140	+0.63%
1990	185	+3.55%
1999	201	+0.93%
2007	228	+1.59%
2012	230	+0.17%
2017	217	−1.16%
2023	213	−0.31%
Source: INSEE

== See also ==
- Communes of the Gard department
