= Saint-Laurent-de-Carnols =

- Commune
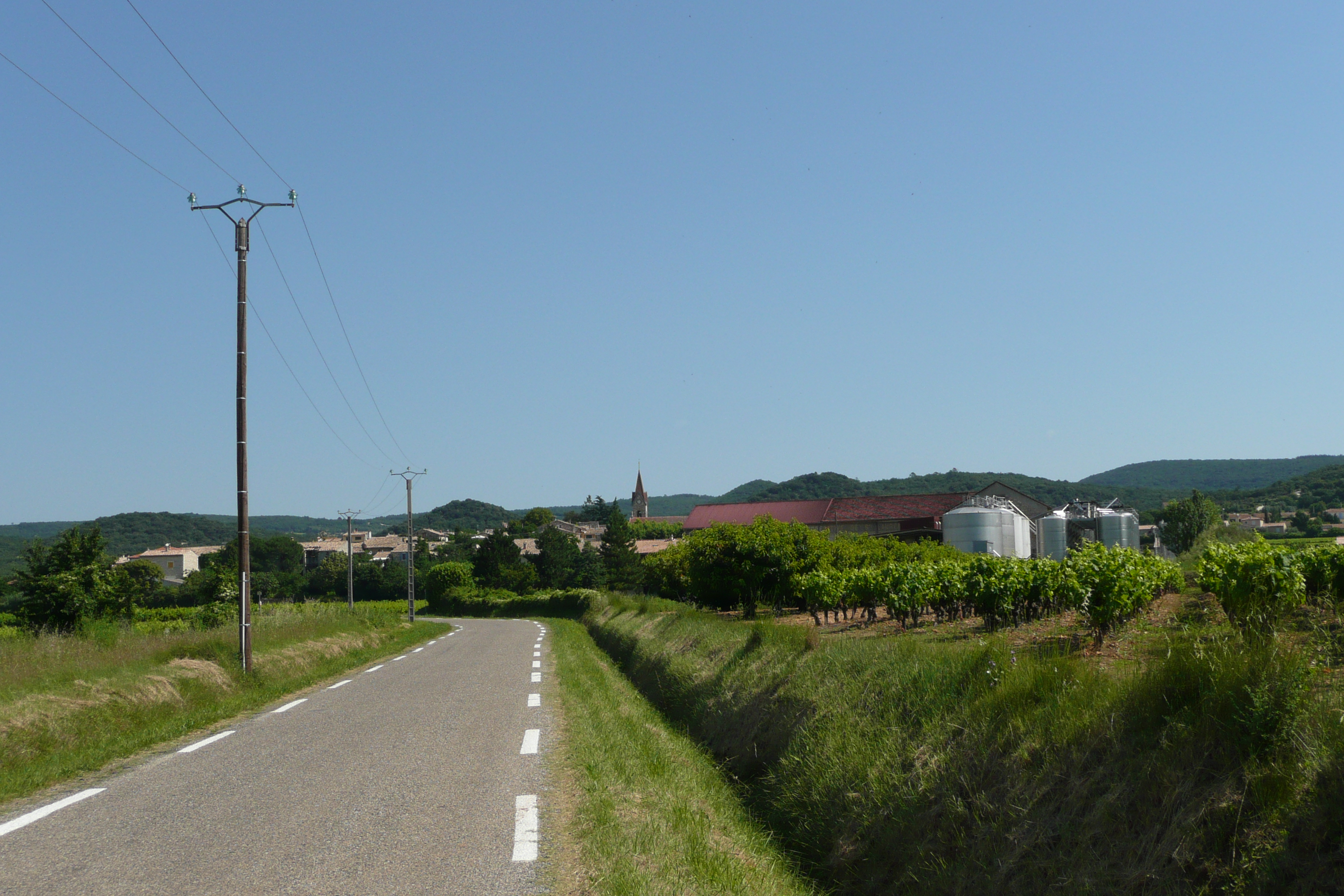
- A general view of Saint-Laurent-de-Carnols

- Coat of arms
- Location of Saint-Laurent-de-Carnols
- Location within France Location within Occitanie
- Coordinates: 44°12′47″N 4°31′52″E
- Country: France
- Region: Occitania
- Department: Gard
- Arrondissement: Nîmes
- Canton: Pont-Saint-Esprit
- Intercommunality: CA Gard Rhodanien

Government
  - Mayor (2020–2026): Guy Aubanel
- Area^{1}: 10.15 km^{2} (3.92 sq mi)
- Elevation: 150 m (490 ft)
- Highest elevation: 359 m (1,178 ft)
- Lowest elevation: 59 m (194 ft)
- Population (2023): 553
  - Density: 54.5/km^{2} (141/sq mi)
- Time zone: UTC+01:00 (CET)
  - Summer (DST): UTC+02:00 (CEST)
- INSEE/Postal code: 30277 /30200
- ^{1} French Land Register data, which excludes lakes, ponds, glaciers > 1 km^{2} (0.386 sq mi or 247 acres) and river estuaries.

Saint-Laurent-de-Carnols is a commune in the Gard department in southern France.

== Population ==
Historical population
Year	Pop.	±% p.a.
1968	189	—
1975	189	+0.00%
1982	203	+1.03%
1990	279	+4.06%
1999	403	+4.17%
2007	450	+1.39%
2012	469	+0.83%
2017	496	+1.13%
2023	553	+1.83%
Source: INSEE

== See also ==
- Communes of the Gard department
