= Saint-André-de-Roquepertuis =

- Commune
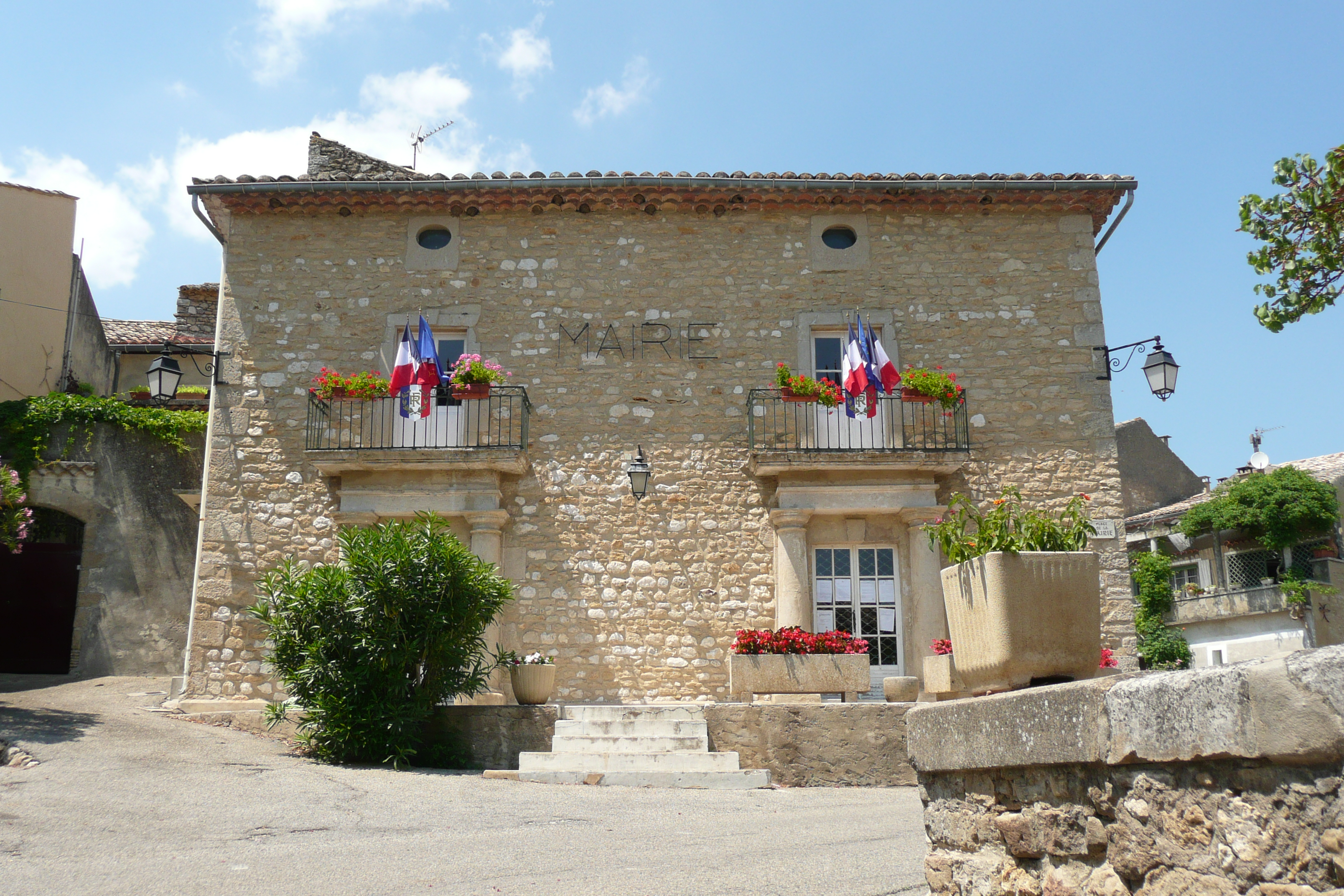
- Town hall

- Coat of arms
- Location of Saint-André-de-Roquepertuis
- Location within France Location within Occitanie
- Coordinates: 44°14′29″N 4°27′24″E
- Country: France
- Region: Occitania
- Department: Gard
- Arrondissement: Nîmes
- Canton: Pont-Saint-Esprit
- Intercommunality: CA Gard Rhodanien

Government
  - Mayor (2020–2026): Fabienne Michel
- Area^{1}: 12.18 km^{2} (4.70 sq mi)
- Elevation: 83 m (272 ft)
- Highest elevation: 309 m (1,014 ft)
- Lowest elevation: 70 m (230 ft)
- Population (2023): 562
  - Density: 46.1/km^{2} (120/sq mi)
- Time zone: UTC+01:00 (CET)
  - Summer (DST): UTC+02:00 (CEST)
- INSEE/Postal code: 30230 /30630
- ^{1} French Land Register data, which excludes lakes, ponds, glaciers > 1 km^{2} (0.386 sq mi or 247 acres) and river estuaries.

Saint-André-de-Roquepertuis (French pronunciation: [sɛ̃.t‿ɑ̃dʁe də ʁɔkpɛʁtɥi]; Occitan: Sant Andrieu de Ròcapertusa) is a commune in the Gard department in southern France.

== Population ==
Historical population
Year	Pop.	±% p.a.
1968	291	—
1975	288	−0.15%
1982	273	−0.76%
1990	361	+3.55%
1999	397	+1.06%
2007	509	+3.16%
2012	574	+2.43%
2017	594	+0.69%
2023	562	−0.92%
Source: INSEE

== See also ==
- Communes of the Gard department
