= Saint-Gervais, Gard =

Saint-Gervais
- Commune
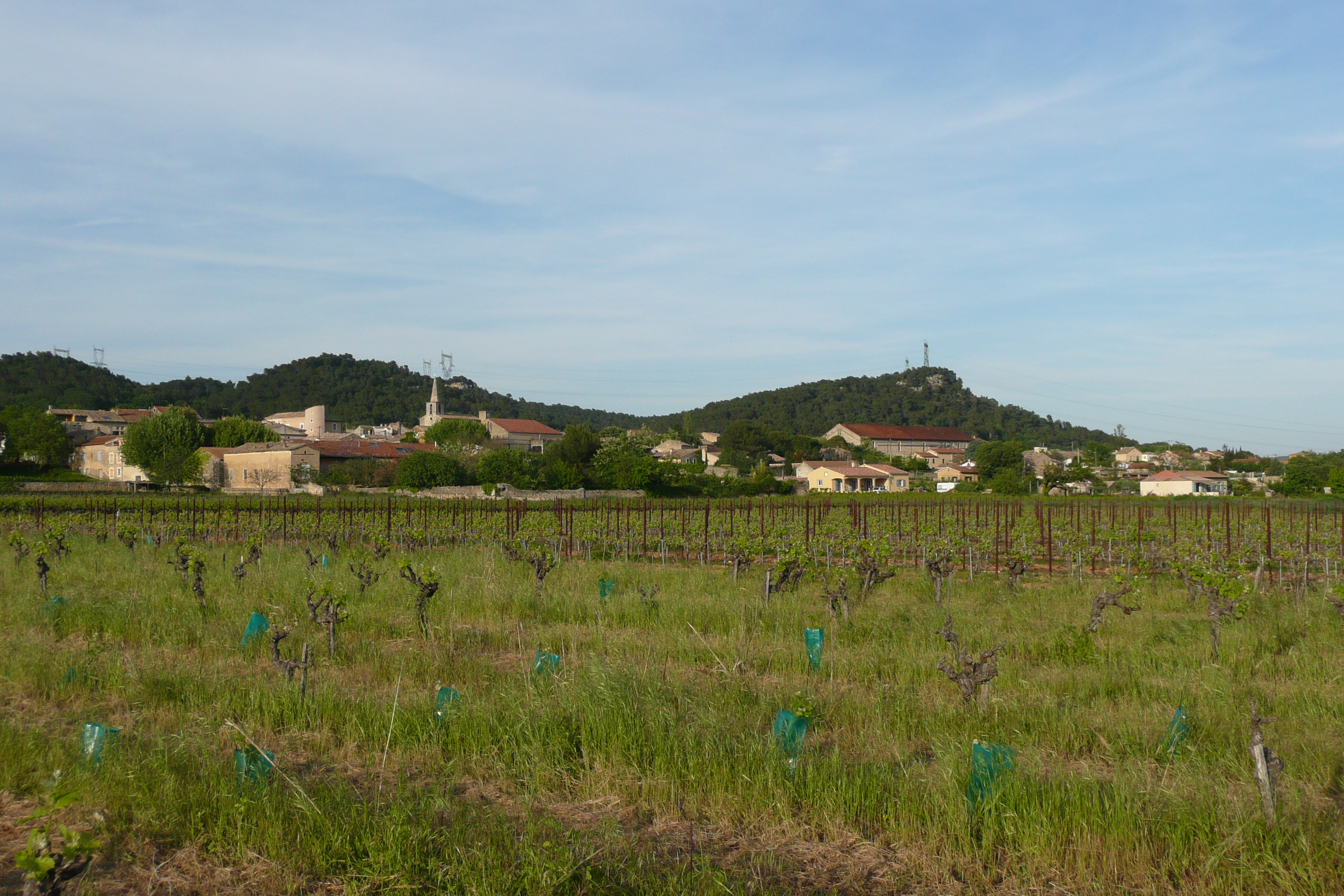
- A general view of Saint-Gervais

- Coat of arms
- Location of Saint-Gervais
- Location within France Location within Occitanie
- Coordinates: 44°11′08″N 4°34′28″E
- Country: France
- Region: Occitania
- Department: Gard
- Arrondissement: Nîmes
- Canton: Pont-Saint-Esprit
- Intercommunality: CA Gard Rhodanien

Government
  - Mayor (2020–2026): Raymond Chapuy
- Area^{1}: 11.87 km^{2} (4.58 sq mi)
- Elevation: 49 m (161 ft)
- Highest elevation: 240 m (790 ft)
- Lowest elevation: 39 m (128 ft)
- Population (2023): 801
  - Density: 67.5/km^{2} (175/sq mi)
- Time zone: UTC+01:00 (CET)
  - Summer (DST): UTC+02:00 (CEST)
- INSEE/Postal code: 30256 /30200
- ^{1} French Land Register data, which excludes lakes, ponds, glaciers > 1 km^{2} (0.386 sq mi or 247 acres) and river estuaries.

Saint-Gervais (French pronunciation: [sɛ̃ ʒɛʁvɛ]; Provençal: Sent Gervàs) is a commune in the Gard department in southern France.

== Population ==
Historical population
Year	Pop.	±% p.a.
1968	528	—
1975	502	−0.72%
1982	549	+1.29%
1990	600	+1.12%
1999	664	+1.13%
2007	678	+0.26%
2012	672	−0.18%
2017	720	+1.39%
2023	801	+1.79%
Source: INSEE

== See also ==
- Communes of the Gard department
