= Vénéjan =

Commune in southern France

- Commune
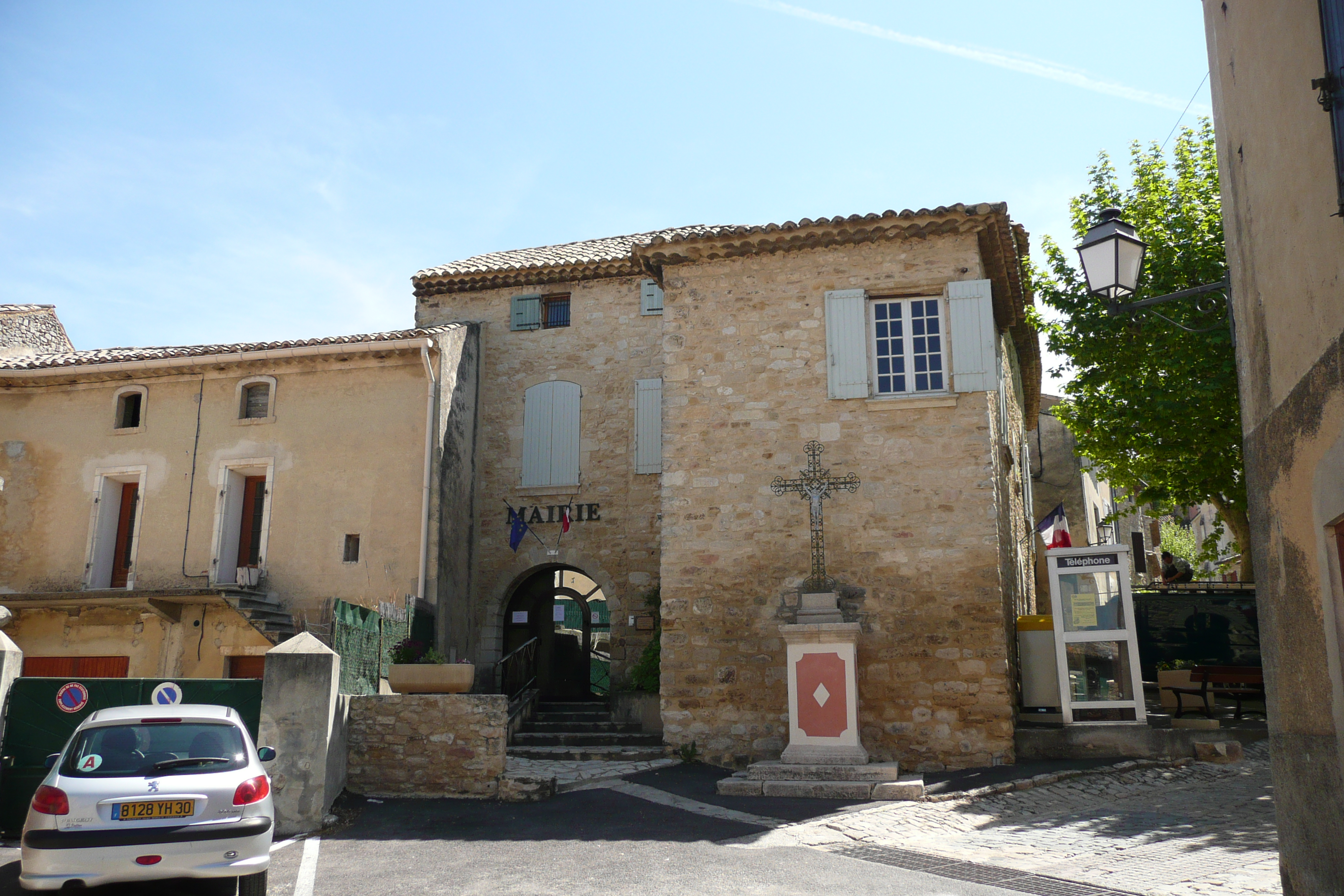
- Town hall

- Coat of arms
- Location of Vénéjan
- Location within France Location within Occitanie
- Coordinates: 44°11′52″N 4°39′30″E
- Country: France
- Region: Occitania
- Department: Gard
- Arrondissement: Nîmes
- Canton: Pont-Saint-Esprit
- Intercommunality: CA Gard Rhodanien

Government
  - Mayor (2020–2026): Gérard Estelle
- Area^{1}: 18.55 km^{2} (7.16 sq mi)
- Elevation: 90 m (300 ft)
- Highest elevation: 283 m (928 ft)
- Lowest elevation: 35 m (115 ft)
- Population (2023): 1,260
  - Density: 67.9/km^{2} (176/sq mi)
- Time zone: UTC+01:00 (CET)
  - Summer (DST): UTC+02:00 (CEST)
- INSEE/Postal code: 30342 /30200
- ^{1} French Land Register data, which excludes lakes, ponds, glaciers > 1 km^{2} (0.386 sq mi or 247 acres) and river estuaries.

Vénéjan (French pronunciation: [veneʒɑ̃]; Occitan: Venejan) is a commune in the Gard department in southern France.

== Population ==
Historical population
Year	Pop.	±% p.a.
1968	484	—
1975	610	+3.36%
1982	778	+3.54%
1990	924	+2.17%
1999	1,044	+1.37%
2007	1,158	+1.30%
2012	1,208	+0.85%
2017	1,246	+0.62%
2023	1,260	+0.19%
Source: INSEE

== See also ==
- Communes of the Gard department
