= Saint-André-d'Olérargues =

- Commune
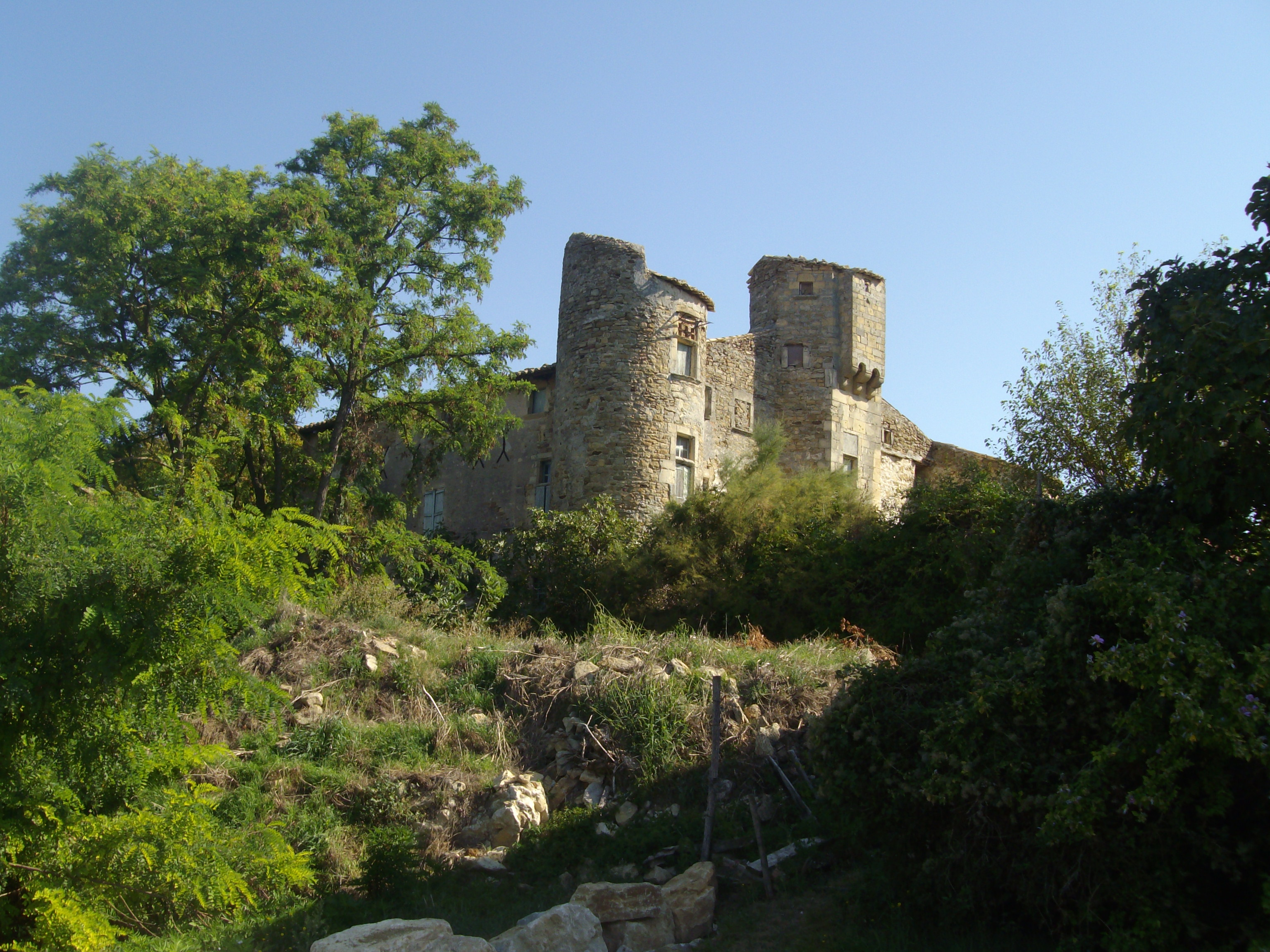
- The chateau of Saint-André-d'Olérargues

- Coat of arms
- Location of Saint-André-d'Olérargues
- Location within France Location within Occitanie
- Coordinates: 44°09′46″N 4°29′10″E
- Country: France
- Region: Occitania
- Department: Gard
- Arrondissement: Nîmes
- Canton: Pont-Saint-Esprit
- Intercommunality: CA Gard Rhodanien

Government
  - Mayor (2020–2026): Nathalie Lacousse
- Area^{1}: 9.75 km^{2} (3.76 sq mi)
- Elevation: 217 m (712 ft)
- Highest elevation: 263 m (863 ft)
- Lowest elevation: 86 m (282 ft)
- Population (2023): 443
  - Density: 45.4/km^{2} (118/sq mi)
- Time zone: UTC+01:00 (CET)
  - Summer (DST): UTC+02:00 (CEST)
- INSEE/Postal code: 30232 /30330
- ^{1} French Land Register data, which excludes lakes, ponds, glaciers > 1 km^{2} (0.386 sq mi or 247 acres) and river estuaries.

Saint-André-d'Olérargues is a commune in the Gard department in southern France.

== Population ==
Historical population
Year	Pop.	±% p.a.
1968	153	—
1975	145	−0.76%
1982	192	+4.09%
1990	268	+4.26%
1999	289	+0.84%
2007	403	+4.24%
2012	404	+0.05%
2017	429	+1.21%
2023	443	+0.54%
Source: INSEE

== See also ==
- Communes of the Gard department
