= Communauté d'agglomération du Gard Rhodanien =

Gard Rhodanien
- Communauté d'agglomération
- Interactive map of Gard Rhodanien
- Coordinates: 44°10′N 04°36′E
- Country: France
- Region: Occitania
- Department: Gard
- No. of communes: {{{nbcomm}}}
- Established: 2013
- Area: 632.3 km^{2} (244.1 sq mi)
- Population (2019): 74,645
  - Density: 118.1/km^{2} (305.8/sq mi)
- Website: www.gardrhodanien.fr

Communauté d'agglomération du Gard Rhodanien is the communauté d'agglomération, an intercommunal structure, centred on the town of Bagnols-sur-Cèze. It is located in the Gard department, in the Occitania region, southern France. Created in 2013, its seat is in Bagnols-sur-Cèze. Its area is 632.3 km^{2}. Its population was 74,645 in 2019, of which 18,091 in Bagnols-sur-Cèze proper.

== Composition ==
The communauté d'agglomération consists of the following 44 communes:

1. Aiguèze
2. Bagnols-sur-Cèze
3. Carsan
4. Cavillargues
5. Chusclan
6. Codolet
7. Connaux
8. Cornillon
9. Le Garn
10. Gaujac
11. Goudargues
12. Issirac
13. Laudun-l'Ardoise
14. Laval-Saint-Roman
15. Lirac
16. Montclus
17. Montfaucon
18. Orsan
19. Le Pin
20. Pont-Saint-Esprit
21. La Roque-sur-Cèze
22. Sabran
23. Saint-Alexandre
24. Saint-André-de-Roquepertuis
25. Saint-André-d'Olérargues
26. Saint-Christol-de-Rodières
27. Saint-Étienne-des-Sorts
28. Saint-Geniès-de-Comolas
29. Saint-Gervais
30. Saint-Julien-de-Peyrolas
31. Saint-Laurent-de-Carnols
32. Saint-Laurent-des-Arbres
33. Saint-Marcel-de-Careiret
34. Saint-Michel-d'Euzet
35. Saint-Nazaire
36. Saint-Paulet-de-Caisson
37. Saint-Paul-les-Fonts
38. Saint-Pons-la-Calm
39. Saint-Victor-la-Coste
40. Salazac
41. Tavel
42. Tresques
43. Vénéjan
44. Verfeuil
