= Carsan =

Commune in Occitanie, France

- Commune
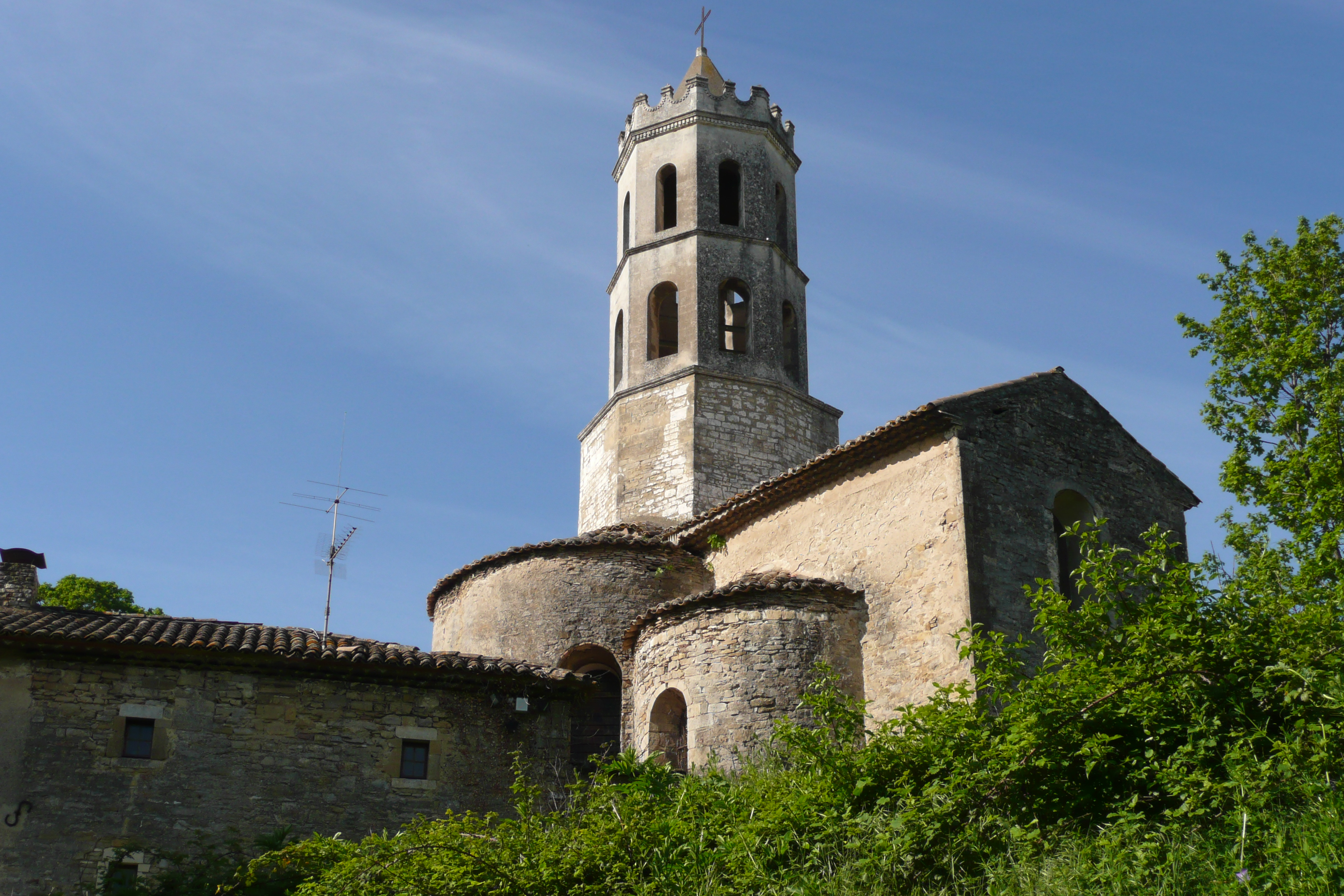
- The church in Carsan

- Coat of arms
- Location of Carsan
- Location within France Location within Occitanie
- Coordinates: 44°14′19″N 4°35′39″E
- Country: France
- Region: Occitania
- Department: Gard
- Arrondissement: Nîmes
- Canton: Pont-Saint-Esprit
- Intercommunality: CA Gard Rhodanien

Government
  - Mayor (2020–2026): Brigitte Vandemeulebroucke
- Area^{1}: 11.71 km^{2} (4.52 sq mi)
- Elevation: 180 m (590 ft)
- Highest elevation: 307 m (1,007 ft)
- Lowest elevation: 98 m (322 ft)
- Population (2023): 768
  - Density: 65.6/km^{2} (170/sq mi)
- Time zone: UTC+01:00 (CET)
  - Summer (DST): UTC+02:00 (CEST)
- INSEE/Postal code: 30070 /30130
- ^{1} French Land Register data, which excludes lakes, ponds, glaciers > 1 km^{2} (0.386 sq mi or 247 acres) and river estuaries.

Carsan (French pronunciation: [kaʁsɑ̃]; Occitan: Carçan) is a commune in the Gard department in southern France.

== Population ==
Historical population
Year	Pop.	±% p.a.
1968	202	—
1975	223	+1.42%
1982	389	+8.27%
1990	509	+3.42%
1999	631	+2.42%
2007	634	+0.06%
2012	659	+0.78%
2017	685	+0.78%
2023	768	+1.92%
Source: INSEE

== See also ==
- Communes of the Gard department
