= Saint-Christol-de-Rodières =

- Commune
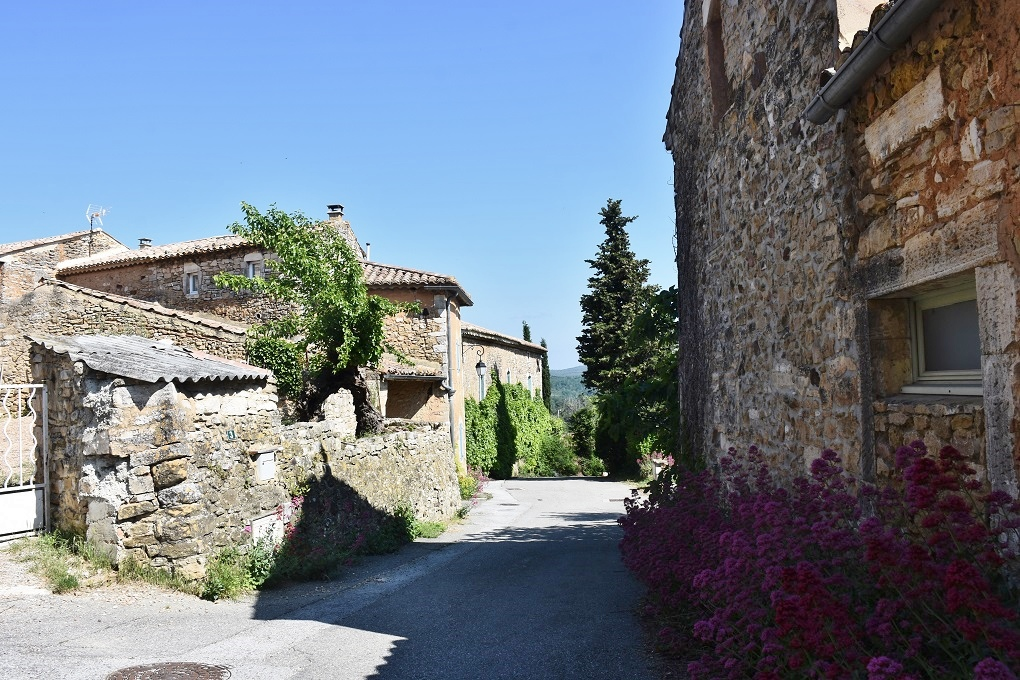

- Coat of arms
- Location of Saint-Christol-de-Rodières
- Location within France Location within Occitanie
- Coordinates: 44°16′10″N 4°30′50″E
- Country: France
- Region: Occitania
- Department: Gard
- Arrondissement: Nîmes
- Canton: Pont-Saint-Esprit
- Intercommunality: CA Gard Rhodanien

Government
  - Mayor (2020–2026): Nathalie Forgerou
- Area^{1}: 8.07 km^{2} (3.12 sq mi)
- Elevation: 231 m (758 ft)
- Highest elevation: 348 m (1,142 ft)
- Lowest elevation: 98 m (322 ft)
- Population (2023): 160
  - Density: 20/km^{2} (51/sq mi)
- Time zone: UTC+01:00 (CET)
  - Summer (DST): UTC+02:00 (CEST)
- INSEE/Postal code: 30242 /30760
- ^{1} French Land Register data, which excludes lakes, ponds, glaciers > 1 km^{2} (0.386 sq mi or 247 acres) and river estuaries.

Saint-Christol-de-Rodières (French pronunciation: [sɛ̃ kʁistɔl də ʁɔdjɛʁ]; Occitan: Sent Cristòu de Rodièra) is a commune in the Gard department in southern France.

== Population ==
Historical population
Year	Pop.	±% p.a.
1968	108	—
1975	95	−1.82%
1982	110	+2.12%
1990	130	+2.11%
1999	126	−0.35%
2007	159	+2.95%
2012	170	+1.35%
2017	160	−1.21%
2023	160	+0.00%
Source: INSEE

== See also ==
- Communes of the Gard department
