= Goudargues =

Administrative division in Occitanie, France

- Commune
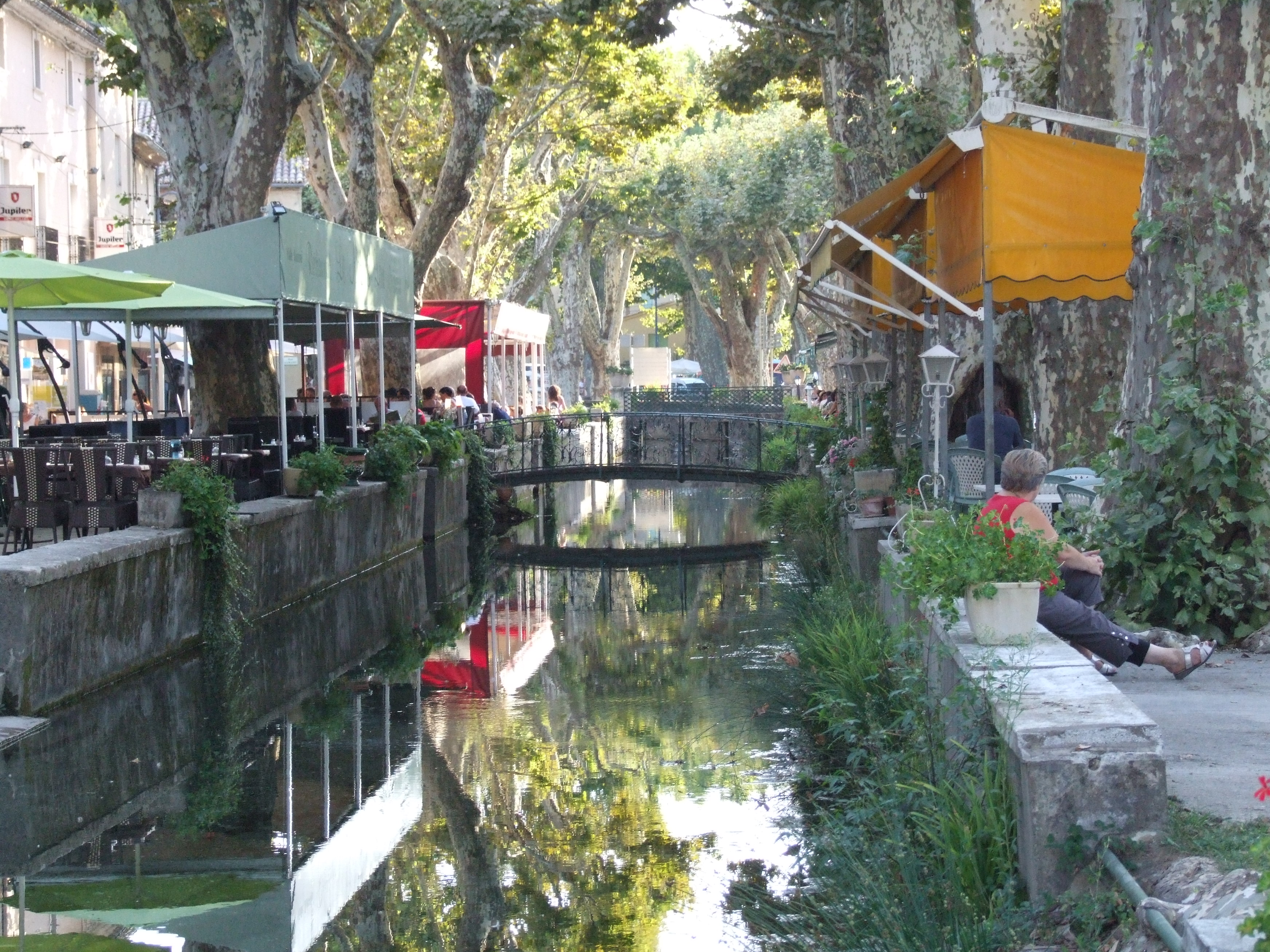
- The Quai de la Fontaine in Goudargues

- Coat of arms
- Location of Goudargues
- Location within France Location within Occitanie
- Coordinates: 44°12′59″N 4°28′00″E
- Country: France
- Region: Occitania
- Department: Gard
- Arrondissement: Nîmes
- Canton: Pont-Saint-Esprit
- Intercommunality: CA Gard Rhodanien

Government
  - Mayor (2020–2026): Fred Mahler
- Area^{1}: 30.27 km^{2} (11.69 sq mi)
- Elevation: 71 m (233 ft)
- Highest elevation: 332 m (1,089 ft)
- Lowest elevation: 70 m (230 ft)
- Population (2023): 1,125
  - Density: 37.17/km^{2} (96.26/sq mi)
- Time zone: UTC+01:00 (CET)
  - Summer (DST): UTC+02:00 (CEST)
- INSEE/Postal code: 30131 /30630
- ^{1} French Land Register data, which excludes lakes, ponds, glaciers > 1 km^{2} (0.386 sq mi or 247 acres) and river estuaries.

Goudargues (French pronunciation: [ɡudaʁɡ]; Occitan: Godargues) is a commune in the Gard department in southern France. Known locally as the Venise Gardoise, because of the canal that flows through it centre. This is lined with pavement cafés and shaded by a two rows of mature plane trees.

== History ==
The Romans are known to have been present in the locality. In AD 800, Benedictine monks from Aniane founded an abbey around the lake of Gordanicus. This lake, near the Cèze was fed by natural springs. It was this abbey that is the basis of modern Goudargues- and the settlements name is derived from Gordanicus.

== Geography ==
The village of Goudargues is situated in the Cèze valley, to the north of the Gard department. Not too far from Avignon, the Pont du Gard, Uzès and Nîmes.

== Population ==
Historical population
Year	Pop.	±% p.a.
1968	645	—
1975	612	−0.75%
1982	680	+1.52%
1990	788	+1.86%
1999	945	+2.04%
2007	1,016	+0.91%
2012	1,072	+1.08%
2017	1,100	+0.52%
2023	1,125	+0.38%
Source: INSEE

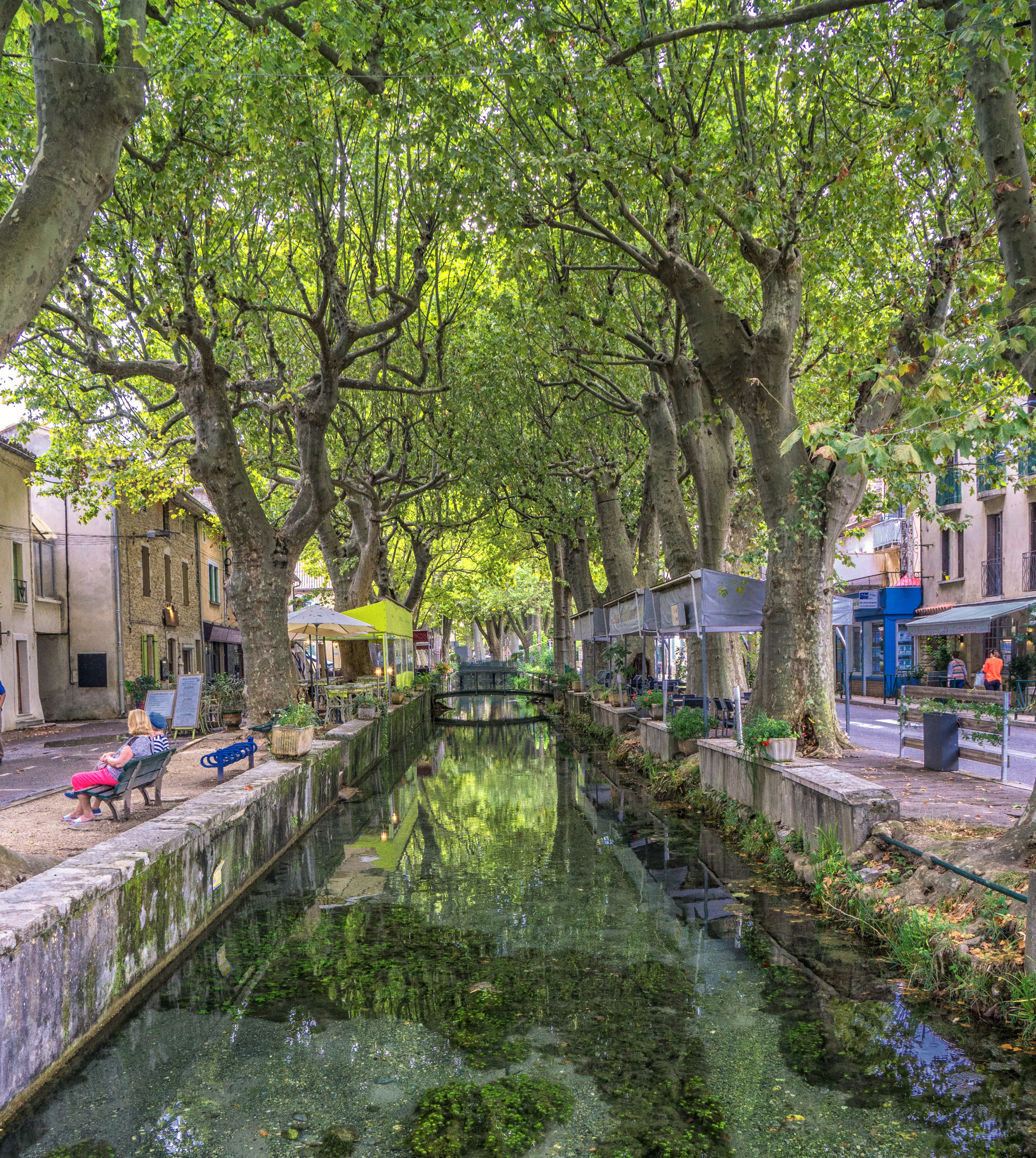
Canal in Goudargues

== See also ==
- Communes of the Gard department
