= Cornillon =

- Commune
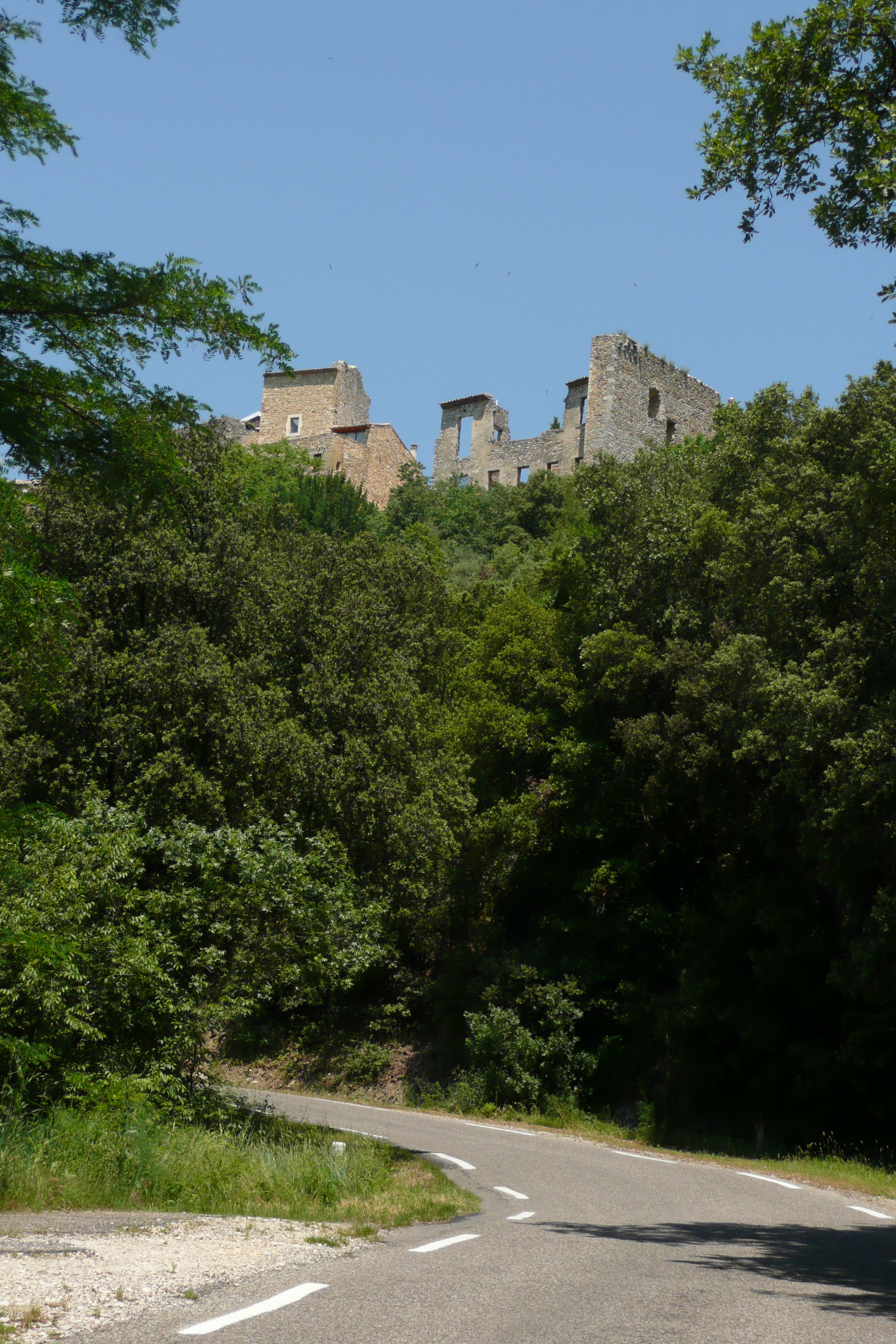
- Ruins at Cornillon

- Coat of arms
- Location of Cornillon
- Location within France Location within Occitanie
- Coordinates: 44°13′33″N 4°29′15″E
- Country: France
- Region: Occitania
- Department: Gard
- Arrondissement: Nîmes
- Canton: Pont-Saint-Esprit
- Intercommunality: CA Gard Rhodanien

Government
  - Mayor (2020–2026): Gilles Delalieu
- Area^{1}: 15.58 km^{2} (6.02 sq mi)
- Elevation: 180 m (590 ft)
- Highest elevation: 360 m (1,180 ft)
- Lowest elevation: 58 m (190 ft)
- Population (2023): 897
  - Density: 57.6/km^{2} (149/sq mi)
- Time zone: UTC+01:00 (CET)
  - Summer (DST): UTC+02:00 (CEST)
- INSEE/Postal code: 30096 /30630
- ^{1} French Land Register data, which excludes lakes, ponds, glaciers > 1 km^{2} (0.386 sq mi or 247 acres) and river estuaries.

Cornillon (French pronunciation: [kɔʁnijɔ̃]; Occitan: Cornilhon) is a commune in the Gard department in southern France.

== Population ==
Historical population
Year	Pop.	±% p.a.
1968	432	—
1975	448	+0.52%
1982	538	+2.65%
1990	609	+1.56%
1999	689	+1.38%
2007	861	+2.82%
2012	932	+1.60%
2017	934	+0.04%
2023	897	−0.67%
Source: INSEE

== See also ==
- Communes of the Gard department
