= Salazac =

- Commune
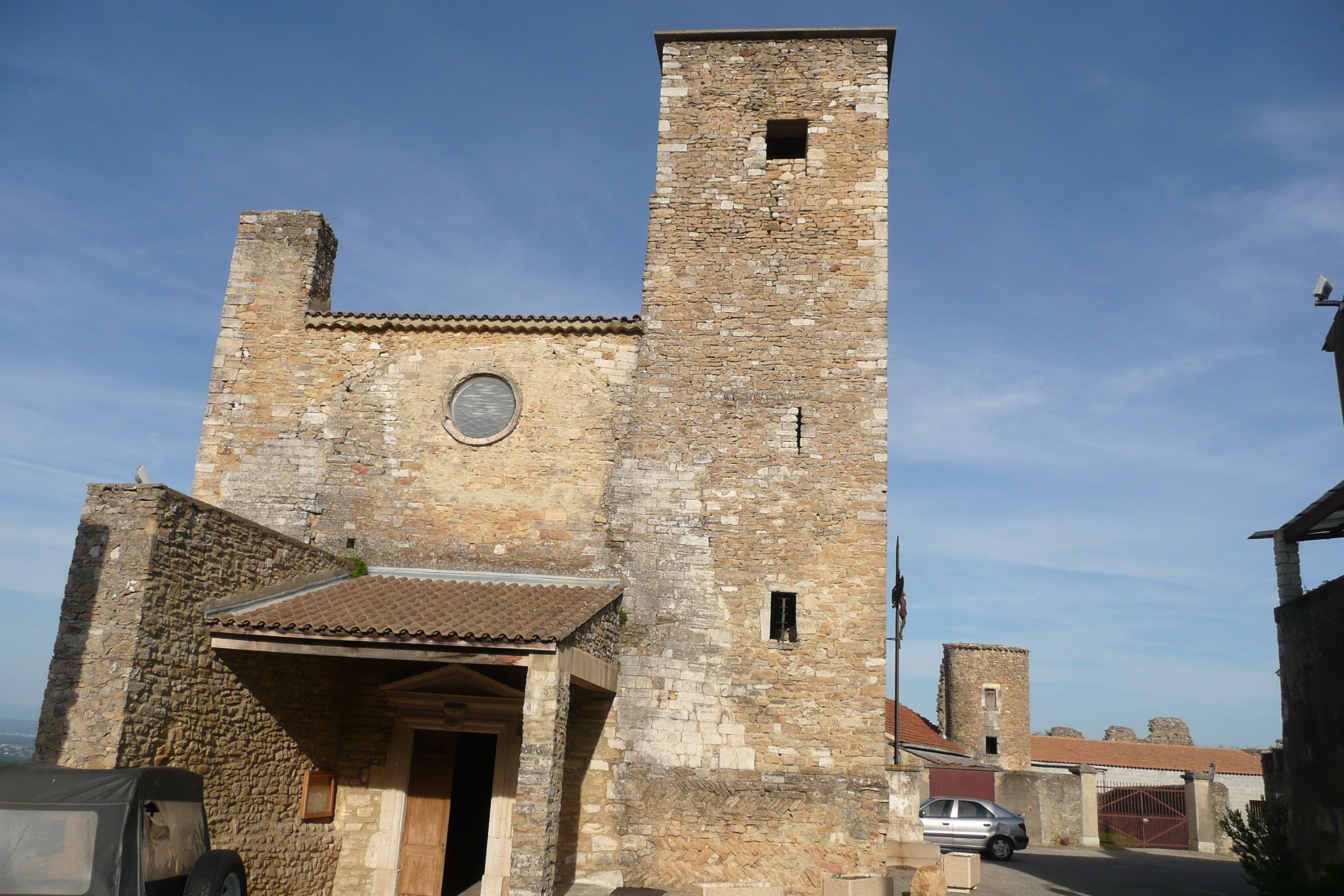
- The church in Salazac

- Coat of arms
- Location of Salazac
- Location within France Location within Occitanie
- Coordinates: 44°15′39″N 4°31′34″E
- Country: France
- Region: Occitania
- Department: Gard
- Arrondissement: Nîmes
- Canton: Pont-Saint-Esprit
- Intercommunality: CA Gard Rhodanien

Government
  - Mayor (2020–2026): Sophie Guigue
- Area^{1}: 9.98 km^{2} (3.85 sq mi)
- Elevation: 254 m (833 ft)
- Highest elevation: 352 m (1,155 ft)
- Lowest elevation: 105 m (344 ft)
- Population (2023): 229
  - Density: 22.9/km^{2} (59.4/sq mi)
- Time zone: UTC+01:00 (CET)
  - Summer (DST): UTC+02:00 (CEST)
- INSEE/Postal code: 30304 /30760
- ^{1} French Land Register data, which excludes lakes, ponds, glaciers > 1 km^{2} (0.386 sq mi or 247 acres) and river estuaries.

Salazac (French pronunciation: [salazak]; Occitan: Salasac) is a commune in the Gard department in southern France.

== Population ==
Historical population
Year	Pop.	±% p.a.
1968	141	—
1975	113	−3.11%
1982	140	+3.11%
1990	140	+0.00%
1999	162	+1.63%
2007	186	+1.74%
2012	185	−0.11%
2017	184	−0.11%
2023	229	+3.71%
Source: INSEE

== See also ==
- Communes of the Gard department
