= Verfeuil =

- Commune
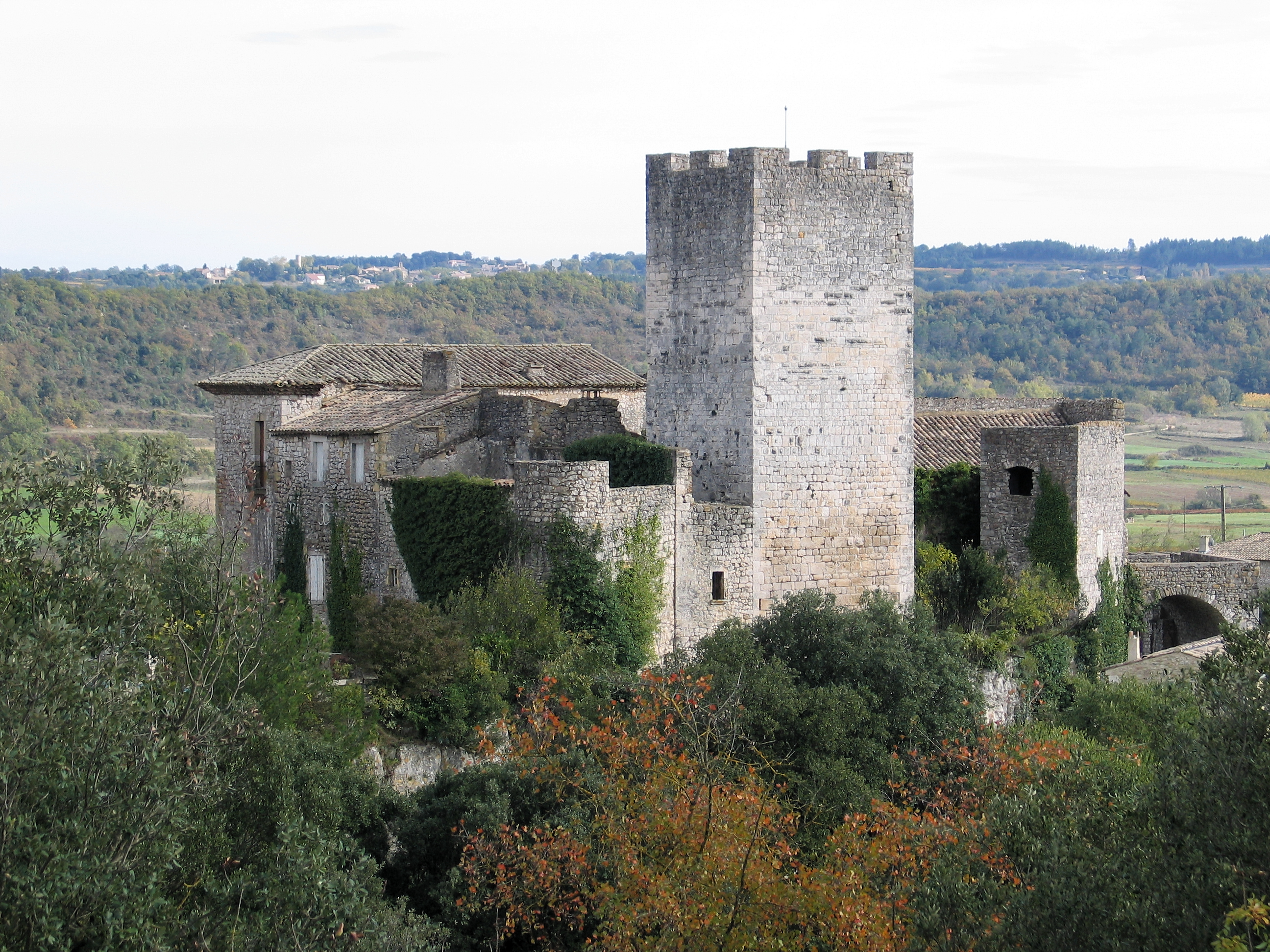
- Château de Verfeuil

- Coat of arms
- Location of Verfeuil
- Location within France Location within Occitanie
- Coordinates: 44°10′12″N 4°26′51″E
- Country: France
- Region: Occitania
- Department: Gard
- Arrondissement: Nîmes
- Canton: Pont-Saint-Esprit
- Intercommunality: CA Gard Rhodanien

Government
  - Mayor (2020–2026): Chantal Pesenti
- Area^{1}: 25.97 km^{2} (10.03 sq mi)
- Elevation: 150 m (490 ft)
- Highest elevation: 324 m (1,063 ft)
- Lowest elevation: 71 m (233 ft)
- Population (2023): 591
  - Density: 22.8/km^{2} (58.9/sq mi)
- Time zone: UTC+01:00 (CET)
  - Summer (DST): UTC+02:00 (CEST)
- INSEE/Postal code: 30343 /30630
- ^{1} French Land Register data, which excludes lakes, ponds, glaciers > 1 km^{2} (0.386 sq mi or 247 acres) and river estuaries.

Verfeuil (French pronunciation: [vɛʁfœj]; Occitan: Verdfuèlh) is a commune in the Gard department in southern France.

== Population ==
Historical population
Year	Pop.	±% p.a.
1968	342	—
1975	365	+0.93%
1982	377	+0.46%
1990	460	+2.52%
1999	452	−0.19%
2007	527	+1.94%
2012	602	+2.70%
2017	600	−0.07%
2023	591	−0.25%
Source: INSEE

== See also ==
- Communes of the Gard department
