= Canton of Pont-Saint-Esprit =

Administrative division of Gard, France

Coordinates: 44.25°N 4.65°E

The canton of Pont-Saint-Esprit is an administrative division of the Gard department, southern France. Its borders were modified at the French canton reorganisation which came into effect in March 2015. Its seat is in Pont-Saint-Esprit.

It consists of the following communes:

1. Aiguèze
2. Carsan
3. Cornillon
4. Le Garn
5. Goudargues
6. Issirac
7. Laval-Saint-Roman
8. Montclus
9. Pont-Saint-Esprit
10. La Roque-sur-Cèze
11. Saint-Alexandre
12. Saint-André-de-Roquepertuis
13. Saint-André-d'Olérargues
14. Saint-Christol-de-Rodières
15. Saint-Gervais
16. Saint-Julien-de-Peyrolas
17. Saint-Laurent-de-Carnols
18. Saint-Marcel-de-Careiret
19. Saint-Michel-d'Euzet
20. Saint-Nazaire
21. Saint-Paulet-de-Caisson
22. Salazac
23. Vénéjan
24. Verfeuil
