= Saint-Marcel-de-Careiret =

- Commune
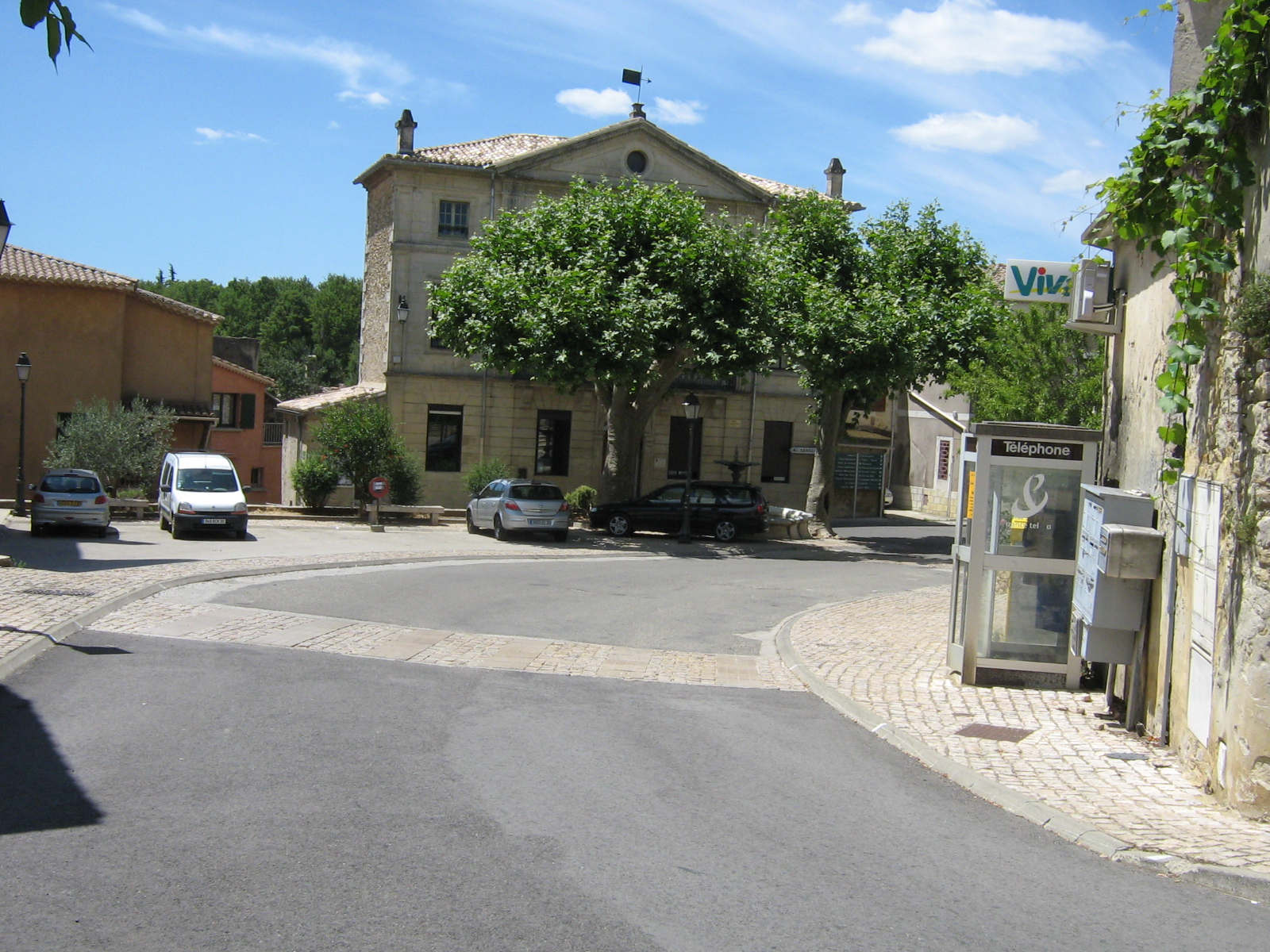
- Town hall

- Coat of arms
- Location of Saint-Marcel-de-Careiret
- Location within France Location within Occitanie
- Coordinates: 44°08′37″N 4°29′19″E
- Country: France
- Region: Occitania
- Department: Gard
- Arrondissement: Nîmes
- Canton: Pont-Saint-Esprit
- Intercommunality: CA Gard Rhodanien

Government
  - Mayor (2020–2026): Carole Bergeri
- Area^{1}: 10.17 km^{2} (3.93 sq mi)
- Elevation: 202 m (663 ft)
- Highest elevation: 289 m (948 ft)
- Lowest elevation: 140 m (460 ft)
- Population (2023): 870
  - Density: 86/km^{2} (220/sq mi)
- Time zone: UTC+01:00 (CET)
  - Summer (DST): UTC+02:00 (CEST)
- INSEE/Postal code: 30282 /30330
- ^{1} French Land Register data, which excludes lakes, ponds, glaciers > 1 km^{2} (0.386 sq mi or 247 acres) and river estuaries.

Saint-Marcel-de-Careiret is a commune in the Gard department in southern France.

== Population ==
Historical population
Year	Pop.	±% p.a.
1968	314	—
1975	349	+1.52%
1982	461	+4.06%
1990	554	+2.32%
1999	616	+1.19%
2007	684	+1.32%
2012	807	+3.36%
2017	845	+0.92%
2023	870	+0.49%
Source: INSEE

== See also ==
- Communes of the Gard department
