= Saint-Paulet-de-Caisson =

- Commune
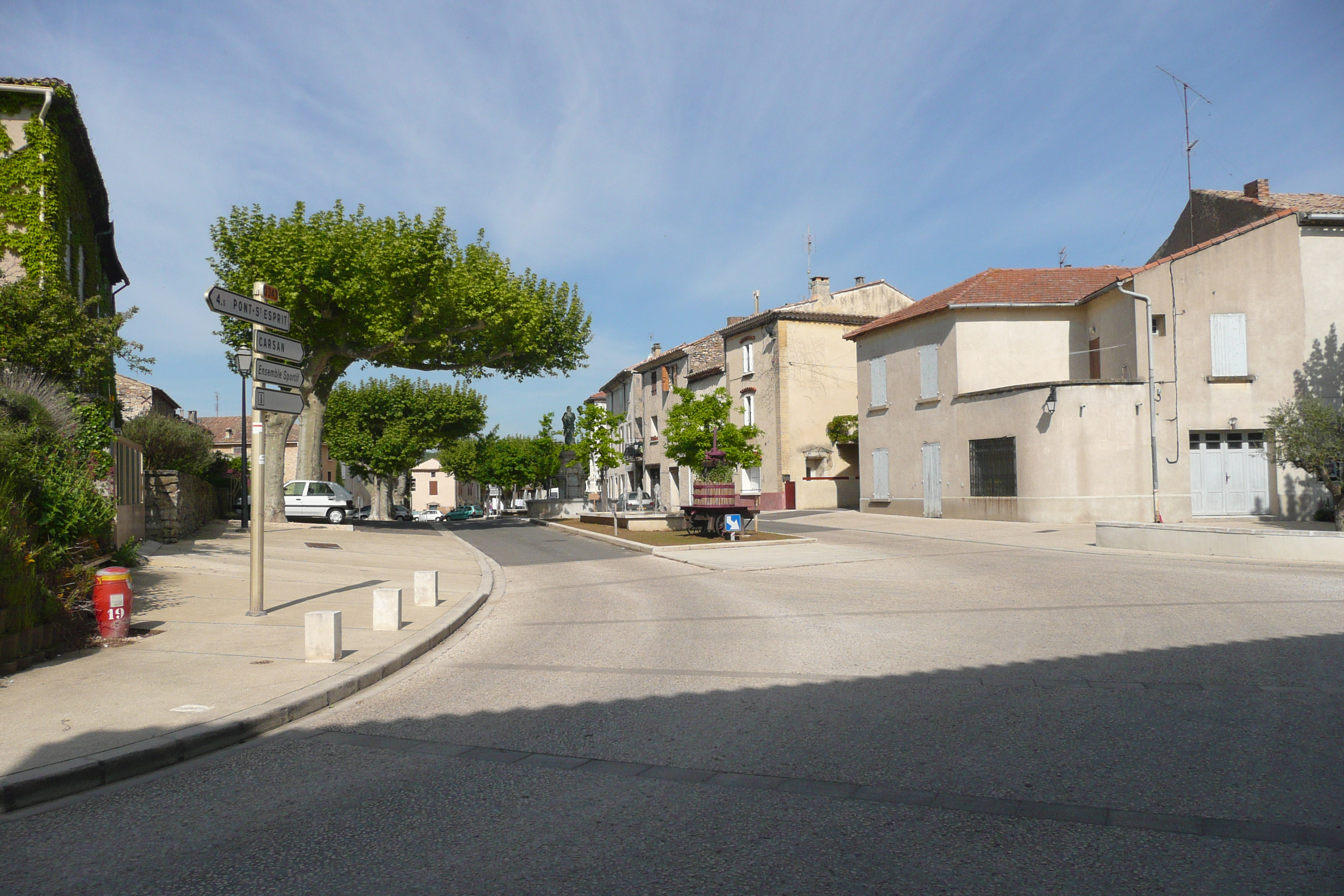
- A view of Saint-Paulet-de-Caisson

- Coat of arms
- Location of Saint-Paulet-de-Caisson
- Location within France Location within Occitanie
- Coordinates: 44°15′51″N 4°35′53″E
- Country: France
- Region: Occitania
- Department: Gard
- Arrondissement: Nîmes
- Canton: Pont-Saint-Esprit
- Intercommunality: CA Gard Rhodanien

Government
  - Mayor (2020–2026): Christophe Serre
- Area^{1}: 16.88 km^{2} (6.52 sq mi)
- Elevation: 100 m (330 ft)
- Highest elevation: 293 m (961 ft)
- Lowest elevation: 50 m (160 ft)
- Population (2023): 1,887
  - Density: 111.8/km^{2} (289.5/sq mi)
- Time zone: UTC+01:00 (CET)
  - Summer (DST): UTC+02:00 (CEST)
- INSEE/Postal code: 30290 /30130
- ^{1} French Land Register data, which excludes lakes, ponds, glaciers > 1 km^{2} (0.386 sq mi or 247 acres) and river estuaries.

Saint-Paulet-de-Caisson (French pronunciation: [sɛ̃ polɛ də kɛsɔ̃]; Occitan: Sent Paulet de Caisson) is a commune in the Gard department in southern France.

== Population ==
Historical population
Year	Pop.	±% p.a.
1968	930	—
1975	944	+0.21%
1982	1,141	+2.74%
1990	1,431	+2.87%
1999	1,602	+1.26%
2007	1,786	+1.37%
2012	1,778	−0.09%
2017	1,810	+0.36%
2023	1,887	+0.70%
Source: INSEE

== See also ==
- Communes of the Gard department
