= Saint-Michel-d'Euzet =

- Commune
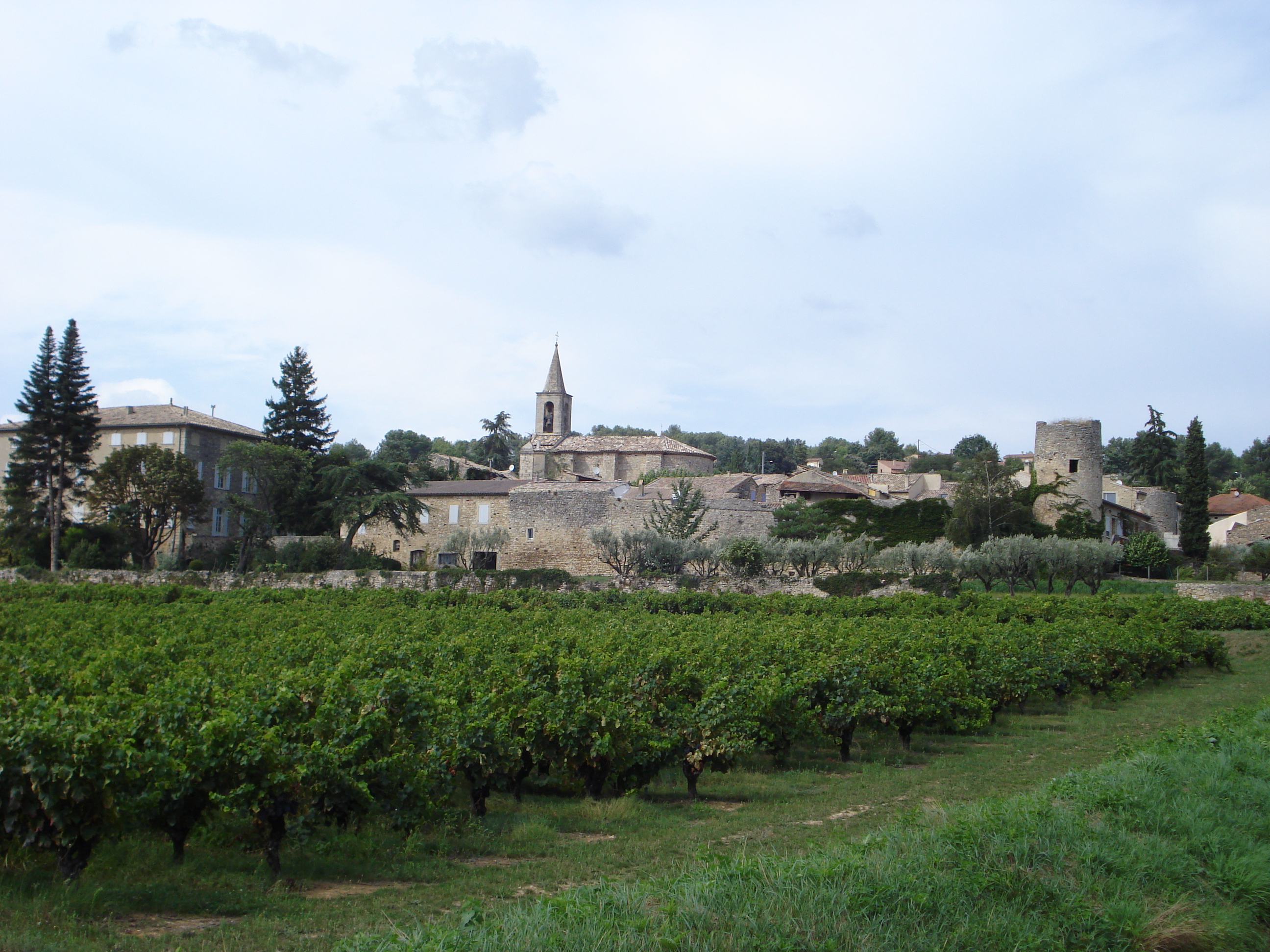
- A general view of Saint-Michel-d'Euzet

- Coat of arms
- Location of Saint-Michel-d'Euzet
- Location within France Location within Occitanie
- Coordinates: 44°12′09″N 4°32′42″E
- Country: France
- Region: Occitania
- Department: Gard
- Arrondissement: Nîmes
- Canton: Pont-Saint-Esprit
- Intercommunality: CA Gard Rhodanien

Government
  - Mayor (2020–2026): Elian Petitjean
- Area^{1}: 10.36 km^{2} (4.00 sq mi)
- Elevation: 90 m (300 ft)
- Highest elevation: 360 m (1,180 ft)
- Lowest elevation: 40 m (130 ft)
- Population (2023): 746
  - Density: 72.0/km^{2} (186/sq mi)
- Time zone: UTC+01:00 (CET)
  - Summer (DST): UTC+02:00 (CEST)
- INSEE/Postal code: 30287 /30200
- ^{1} French Land Register data, which excludes lakes, ponds, glaciers > 1 km^{2} (0.386 sq mi or 247 acres) and river estuaries.

Saint-Michel-d'Euzet (French pronunciation: [sɛ̃ miʃɛl døzɛ]; Occitan: Sent Miquèu d'Euset) is a commune in the Gard department in southern France.

== Population ==
Historical population
Year	Pop.	±% p.a.
1968	309	—
1975	358	+2.13%
1982	467	+3.87%
1990	512	+1.16%
1999	598	+1.74%
2007	586	−0.25%
2012	585	−0.03%
2017	636	+1.69%
2023	746	+2.69%
Source: INSEE

== See also ==
- Communes of the Gard department
