= La Roque-sur-Cèze =

La Roque-sur-Cèze La Ròca de Céser (Occitan)
- Commune
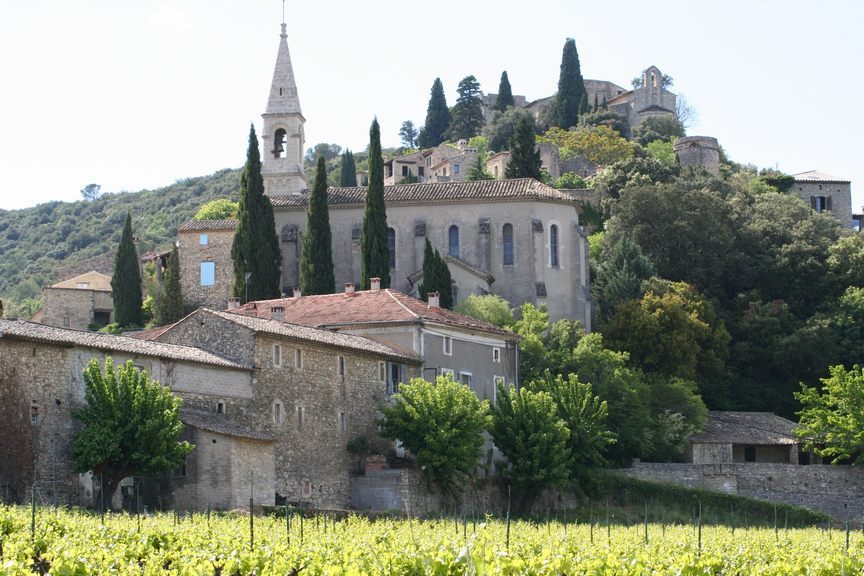
- A view of La Roque-sur-Cèze

- Coat of arms
- Location of La Roque-sur-Cèze
- Location within France Location within Occitanie
- Coordinates: 44°11′40″N 4°31′13″E
- Country: France
- Region: Occitania
- Department: Gard
- Arrondissement: Nîmes
- Canton: Pont-Saint-Esprit
- Intercommunality: CA Gard Rhodanien

Government
  - Mayor (2020–2026): Robert Gautier
- Area^{1}: 8.37 km^{2} (3.23 sq mi)
- Elevation: 132 m (433 ft)
- Highest elevation: 247 m (810 ft)
- Lowest elevation: 50 m (160 ft)
- Population (2023): 172
  - Density: 20.5/km^{2} (53.2/sq mi)
- Time zone: UTC+01:00 (CET)
  - Summer (DST): UTC+02:00 (CEST)
- INSEE/Postal code: 30222 /30200
- ^{1} French Land Register data, which excludes lakes, ponds, glaciers > 1 km^{2} (0.386 sq mi or 247 acres) and river estuaries.

La Roque-sur-Cèze (French pronunciation: [la ʁɔk syʁ sɛz]; Occitan: La Ròca de Céser) is a commune in the Gard department in the Occitanie region of Southern France. It is a member of Les Plus Beaux Villages de France (The Most Beautiful Villages of France) Association.

== Population ==
Historical population
Year	Pop.	±% p.a.
1968	122	—
1975	104	−2.25%
1982	133	+3.58%
1990	153	+1.77%
1999	194	+2.67%
2007	174	−1.35%
2012	173	−0.12%
2017	184	+1.24%
2023	172	−1.12%
Source: INSEE

== See also ==
- Communes of the Gard department
