= Issirac =

- Commune
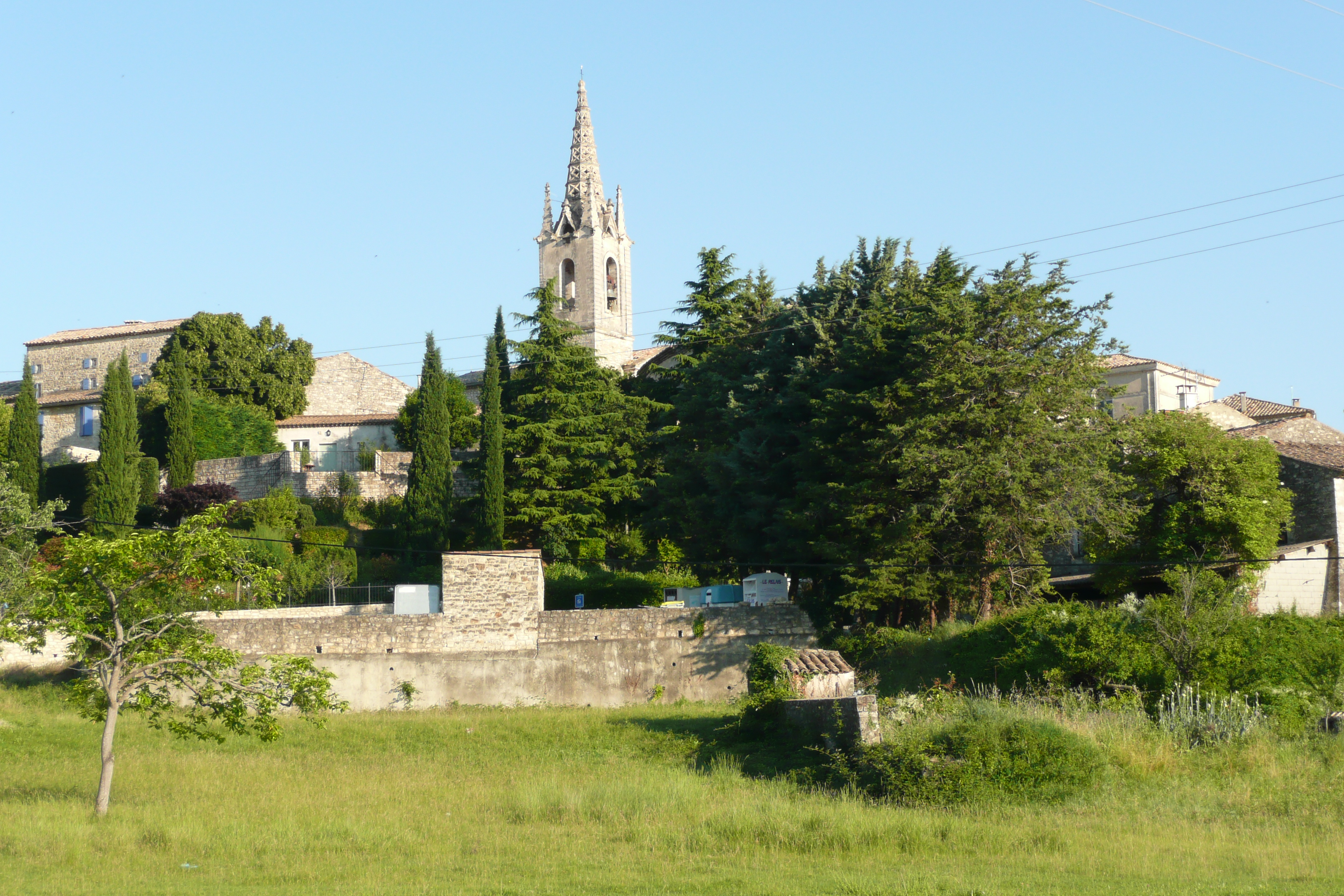
- A general view of Issirac

- Coat of arms
- Location of Issirac
- Location within France Location within Occitanie
- Coordinates: 44°16′21″N 4°28′54″E
- Country: France
- Region: Occitania
- Department: Gard
- Arrondissement: Nîmes
- Canton: Pont-Saint-Esprit
- Intercommunality: CA Gard Rhodanien

Government
  - Mayor (2020–2026): José Rieu
- Area^{1}: 20.28 km^{2} (7.83 sq mi)
- Elevation: 286 m (938 ft)
- Highest elevation: 367 m (1,204 ft)
- Lowest elevation: 93 m (305 ft)
- Population (2023): 321
  - Density: 15.8/km^{2} (41.0/sq mi)
- Time zone: UTC+01:00 (CET)
  - Summer (DST): UTC+02:00 (CEST)
- INSEE/Postal code: 30134 /30760
- ^{1} French Land Register data, which excludes lakes, ponds, glaciers > 1 km^{2} (0.386 sq mi or 247 acres) and river estuaries.

Issirac (French pronunciation: [isiʁak]) is a commune in the Gard department in southern France.

== Population ==
Historical population
Year	Pop.	±% p.a.
1968	152	—
1975	150	−0.19%
1982	150	+0.00%
1990	163	+1.04%
1999	180	+1.11%
2007	221	+2.60%
2012	227	+0.54%
2017	310	+6.43%
2023	321	+0.58%
Source: INSEE

== See also ==
- Communes of the Gard department
- Côtes du Vivarais AOC
