= Le Garn =

- Commune
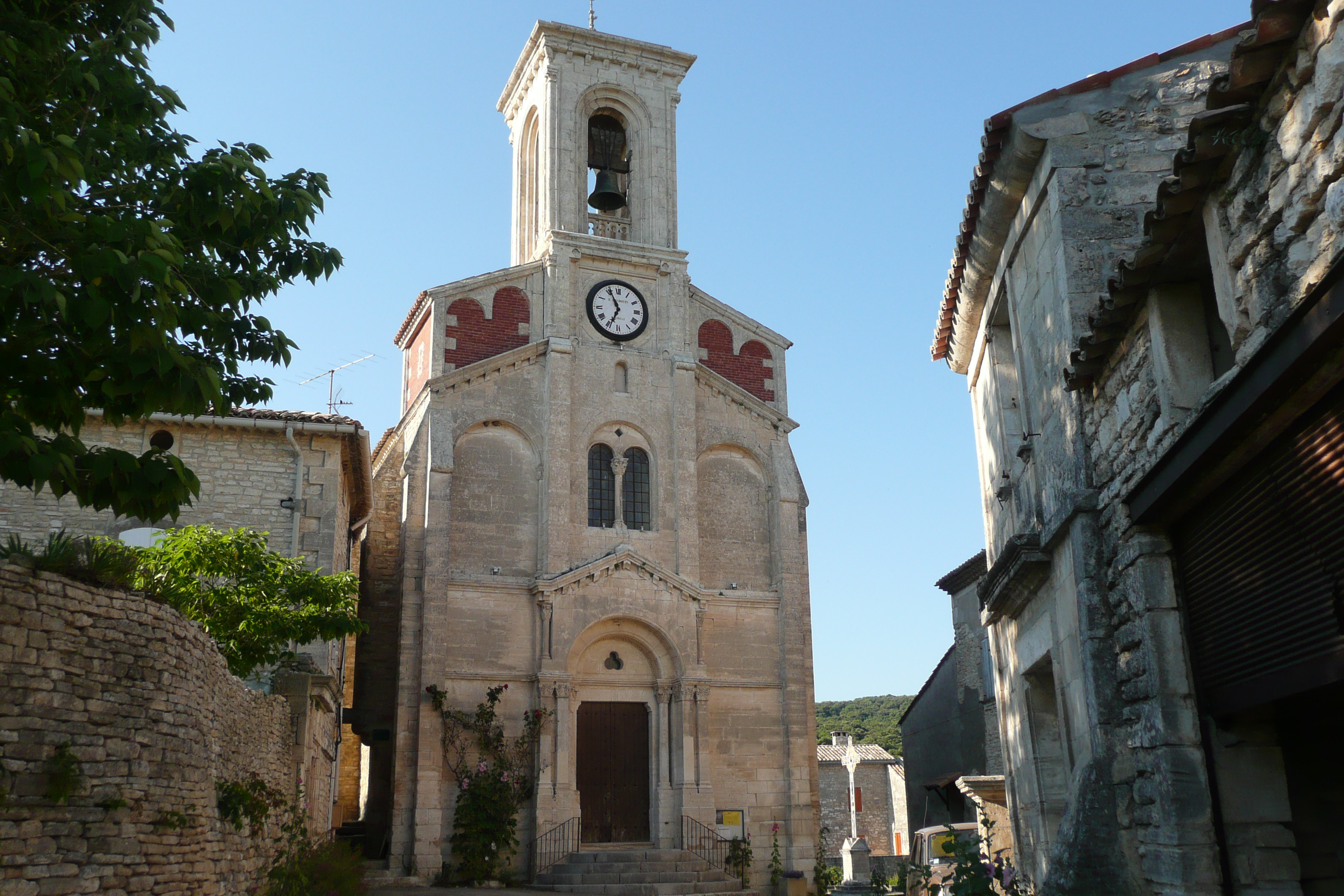
- The church of Le Garn

- Coat of arms
- Location of Le Garn
- Location within France Location within Occitanie
- Coordinates: 44°18′26″N 4°28′24″E
- Country: France
- Region: Occitania
- Department: Gard
- Arrondissement: Nîmes
- Canton: Pont-Saint-Esprit
- Intercommunality: CA Gard Rhodanien

Government
  - Mayor (2020–2026): Julie Mercier
- Area^{1}: 10.81 km^{2} (4.17 sq mi)
- Elevation: 180 m (590 ft)
- Highest elevation: 404 m (1,325 ft)
- Lowest elevation: 49 m (161 ft)
- Population (2023): 277
  - Density: 25.6/km^{2} (66.4/sq mi)
- Time zone: UTC+01:00 (CET)
  - Summer (DST): UTC+02:00 (CEST)
- INSEE/Postal code: 30124 /30760
- ^{1} French Land Register data, which excludes lakes, ponds, glaciers > 1 km^{2} (0.386 sq mi or 247 acres) and river estuaries.

Le Garn (French pronunciation: [lə ɡaʁn]; Occitan: Lo Garn) is a commune in the Gard department in southern France.

== Population ==
Historical population
Year	Pop.	±% p.a.
1968	134	—
1975	128	−0.65%
1982	149	+2.19%
1990	192	+3.22%
1999	221	+1.58%
2007	220	−0.06%
2012	232	+1.07%
2017	213	−1.69%
2023	277	+4.48%
Source: INSEE

== See also ==
- Communes of the Gard department
- Côtes du Vivarais AOC
