= Aiguèze =

Commune in Occitanie, France

Aiguèze Aiguesa (Occitan)
- Commune
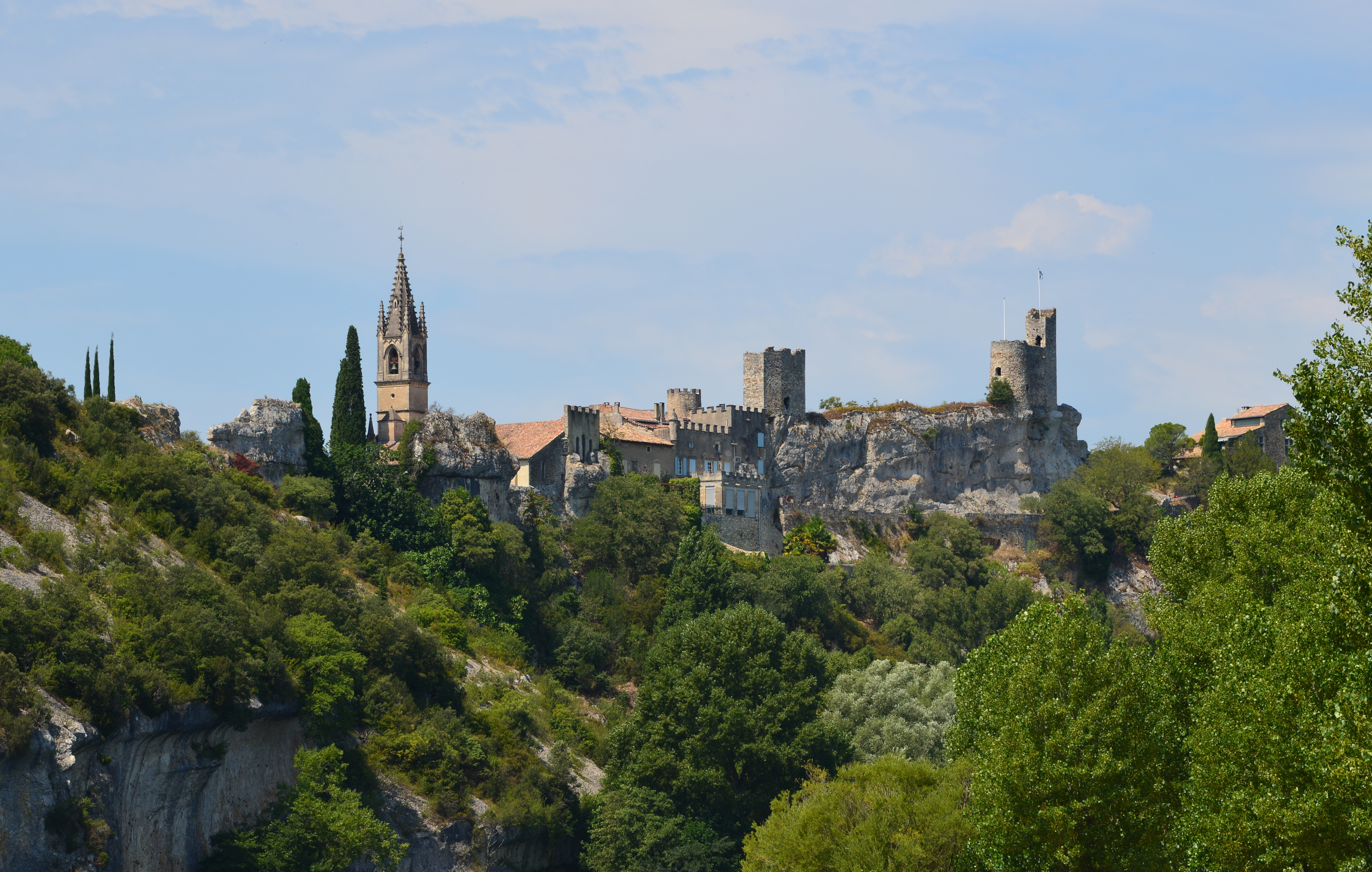
- A view of Aiguèze

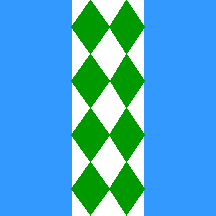
- Flag Coat of arms
- Location of Aiguèze
- Location within France Location within Occitanie
- Coordinates: 44°18′15″N 4°33′23″E
- Country: France
- Region: Occitania
- Department: Gard
- Arrondissement: Nîmes
- Canton: Pont-Saint-Esprit
- Intercommunality: CA Gard Rhodanien

Government
  - Mayor (2020–2026): Charles Bascle
- Area^{1}: 20.03 km^{2} (7.73 sq mi)
- Elevation: 88 m (289 ft)
- Highest elevation: 405 m (1,329 ft)
- Lowest elevation: 40 m (130 ft)
- Population (2023): 212
  - Density: 10.6/km^{2} (27.4/sq mi)
- Time zone: UTC+01:00 (CET)
  - Summer (DST): UTC+02:00 (CEST)
- INSEE/Postal code: 30005 /30760
- ^{1} French Land Register data, which excludes lakes, ponds, glaciers > 1 km^{2} (0.386 sq mi or 247 acres) and river estuaries.

Aiguèze (French pronunciation: [eɡɛz]; Occitan: Aiguesa) is a commune in the Gard department in the Occitanie region of Southern France. Since 2005, Aiguèze has been a member of Les Plus Beaux Villages de France ("The most beautiful villages of France"), the first such location in Gard.

== Population ==
Historical population
| Year | Pop. | ±% p.a. |
|---|---|---|
| 1968 | 206 | — |
| 1975 | 161 | −3.46% |
| 1982 | 182 | +1.77% |
| 1990 | 215 | +2.10% |
| 1999 | 204 | −0.58% |
| 2007 | 220 | +0.95% |
| 2012 | 216 | −0.37% |
| 2017 | 214 | −0.19% |
| 2023 | 212 | −0.16% |
Source: INSEE

== Sights ==
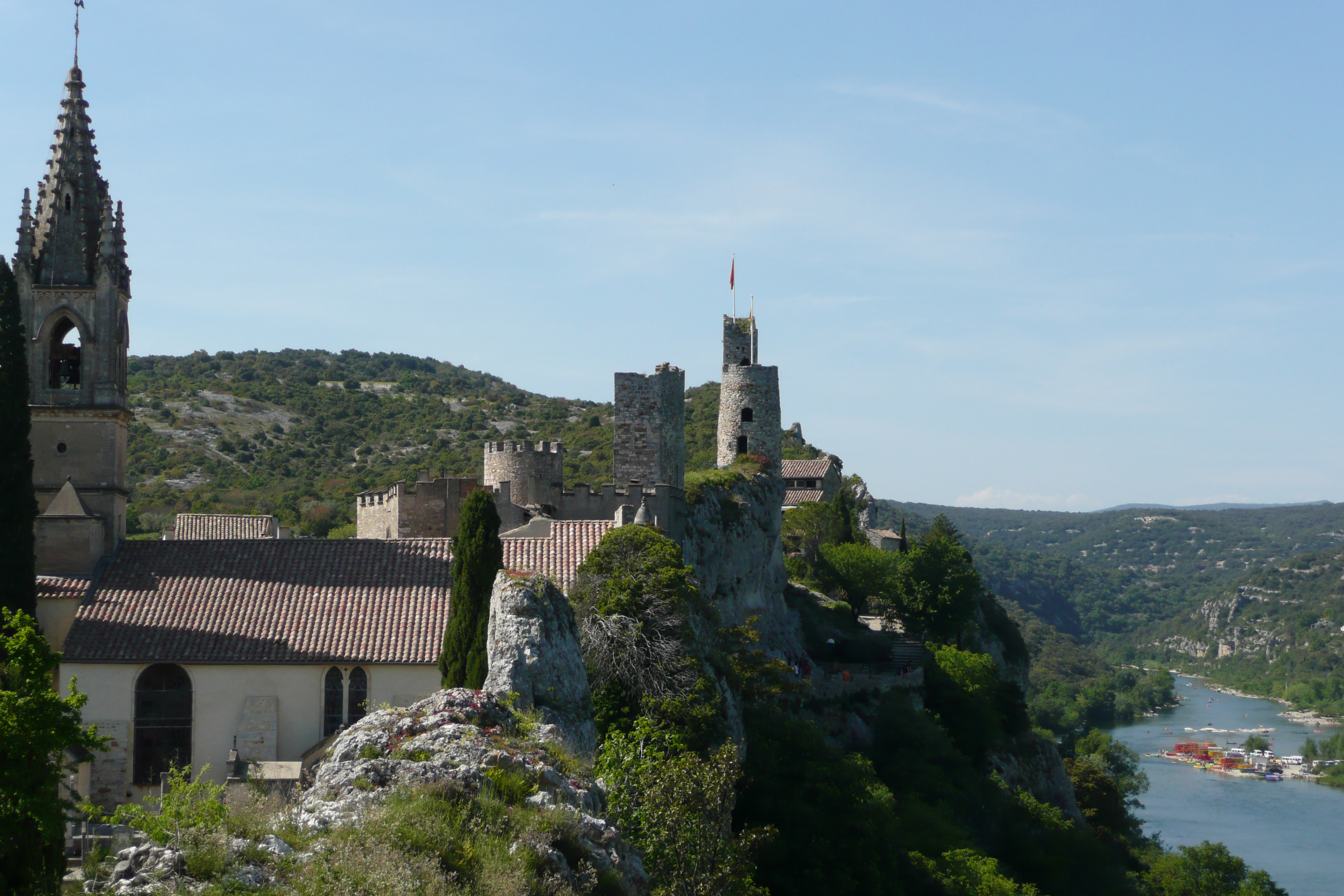

Aiguèze is a medieval village. The 14th century fort has a watchpath which provides fine views of the entrance to the Ardèche Gorges.

The origins of the parish church are Romanesque; a Renaissance doorway was removed in the 19th century. The interior was restored at the beginning of the 20th century with decor donated in 1910 by the Archbishop of Rouen, primate of Normandy, a native of the village. The church has been a listed monument historique since 1993.

Including the church, the commune has five sites recorded in the French Ministry of Culture list of historic sites.

== See also ==
- Communes of the Gard department
