= Saint-Julien-de-Peyrolas =

- Commune
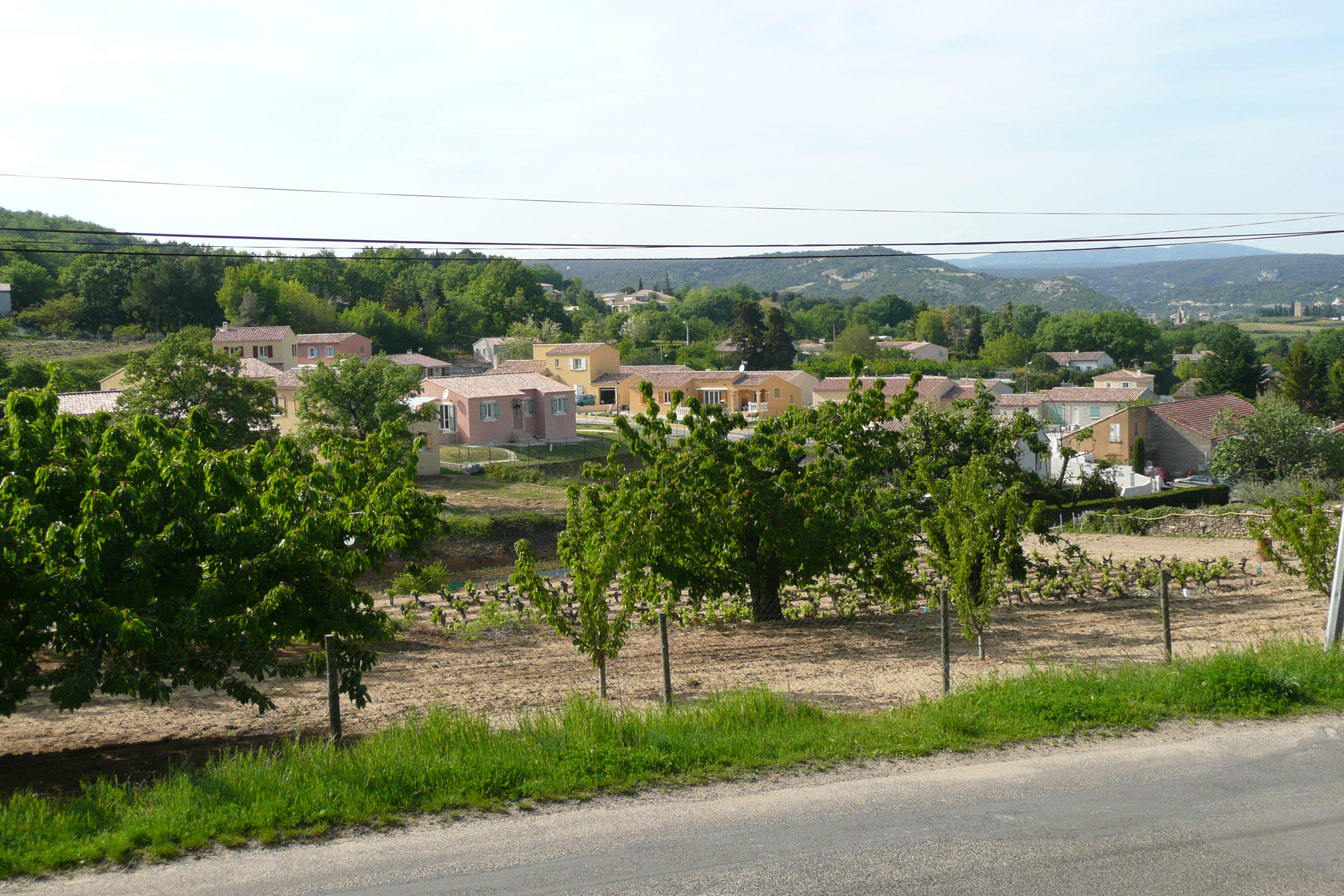
- A general view of Saint-Julien-de-Peyrolas

- Coat of arms
- Location of Saint-Julien-de-Peyrolas
- Location within France Location within Occitanie
- Coordinates: 44°17′19″N 4°33′57″E
- Country: France
- Region: Occitania
- Department: Gard
- Arrondissement: Nîmes
- Canton: Pont-Saint-Esprit
- Intercommunality: CA Gard Rhodanien

Government
  - Mayor (2020–2026): Claude Salau
- Area^{1}: 12.54 km^{2} (4.84 sq mi)
- Elevation: 196 m (643 ft)
- Highest elevation: 211 m (692 ft)
- Lowest elevation: 54 m (177 ft)
- Population (2023): 1,531
  - Density: 122.1/km^{2} (316.2/sq mi)
- Time zone: UTC+01:00 (CET)
  - Summer (DST): UTC+02:00 (CEST)
- INSEE/Postal code: 30273 /30760
- ^{1} French Land Register data, which excludes lakes, ponds, glaciers > 1 km^{2} (0.386 sq mi or 247 acres) and river estuaries.

Saint-Julien-de-Peyrolas (French pronunciation: [sɛ̃ ʒyljɛ̃ də peʁɔlas]; Provençal: Sent Julian de Pairolaç) is a commune in the Gard department in southern France.

== Geography ==
=== Climate ===
Saint-Julien-de-Peyrolas has a hot-summer Mediterranean climate (Köppen climate classification Csa). The average annual temperature in Saint-Julien-de-Peyrolas is 13.9 °C (57.0 °F). The average annual rainfall is 830.7 mm (32.70 in) with October as the wettest month. The temperatures are highest on average in July, at around 23.5 °C (74.3 °F), and lowest in January, at around 5.1 °C (41.2 °F). The highest temperature ever recorded in Saint-Julien-de-Peyrolas was 41.9 °C (107.4 °F) on 27 June 2019; the coldest temperature ever recorded was −11.1 °C (12.0 °F) on 7 January 1985.

Climate data for Saint-Julien-de-Peyrolas (1981−2010 normals, extremes 1972−2020)
Month	Jan	Feb	Mar	Apr	May	Jun	Jul	Aug	Sep	Oct	Nov	Dec	Year
Record high °C (°F)	21.2 (70.2)	22.6 (72.7)	27.2 (81.0)	30.3 (86.5)	34.6 (94.3)	41.9 (107.4)	40.2 (104.4)	41.6 (106.9)	35.9 (96.6)	30.4 (86.7)	24.0 (75.2)	20.0 (68.0)	41.9 (107.4)
Mean daily maximum °C (°F)	9.1 (48.4)	11.0 (51.8)	15.1 (59.2)	18.2 (64.8)	22.9 (73.2)	27.2 (81.0)	30.5 (86.9)	30.0 (86.0)	24.9 (76.8)	19.5 (67.1)	13.1 (55.6)	9.5 (49.1)	19.3 (66.7)
Daily mean °C (°F)	5.1 (41.2)	6.4 (43.5)	9.7 (49.5)	12.5 (54.5)	16.8 (62.2)	20.6 (69.1)	23.5 (74.3)	23.0 (73.4)	18.9 (66.0)	14.6 (58.3)	9.1 (48.4)	5.9 (42.6)	13.9 (57.0)
Mean daily minimum °C (°F)	1.2 (34.2)	1.7 (35.1)	4.2 (39.6)	6.7 (44.1)	10.6 (51.1)	14.0 (57.2)	16.5 (61.7)	16.1 (61.0)	12.9 (55.2)	9.8 (49.6)	5.1 (41.2)	2.3 (36.1)	8.5 (47.3)
Record low °C (°F)	−11.1 (12.0)	−8.2 (17.2)	−10.2 (13.6)	−2.8 (27.0)	−1.0 (30.2)	4.5 (40.1)	8.1 (46.6)	7.0 (44.6)	2.8 (37.0)	−1.4 (29.5)	−6.5 (20.3)	−9.0 (15.8)	−11.1 (12.0)
Average precipitation mm (inches)	62.5 (2.46)	46.1 (1.81)	42.4 (1.67)	72.1 (2.84)	72.4 (2.85)	49.7 (1.96)	40.9 (1.61)	52.6 (2.07)	101.5 (4.00)	127.3 (5.01)	94.2 (3.71)	69.0 (2.72)	830.7 (32.70)
Average precipitation days (≥ 1.0 mm)	6.1	5.2	4.7	7.1	7.3	5.3	3.4	4.2	5.8	8.0	6.7	6.4	70.0
Source: Météo-France

== Population ==
Historical population
Year	Pop.	±% p.a.
1968	667	—
1975	652	−0.32%
1982	711	+1.25%
1990	1,088	+5.46%
1999	1,103	+0.15%
2007	1,206	+1.12%
2012	1,291	+1.37%
2017	1,402	+1.66%
2023	1,531	+1.48%
Source: INSEE

== See also ==
- Communes of the Gard department
