= Saint-Alexandre, Gard =

Saint-Alexandre
- Commune
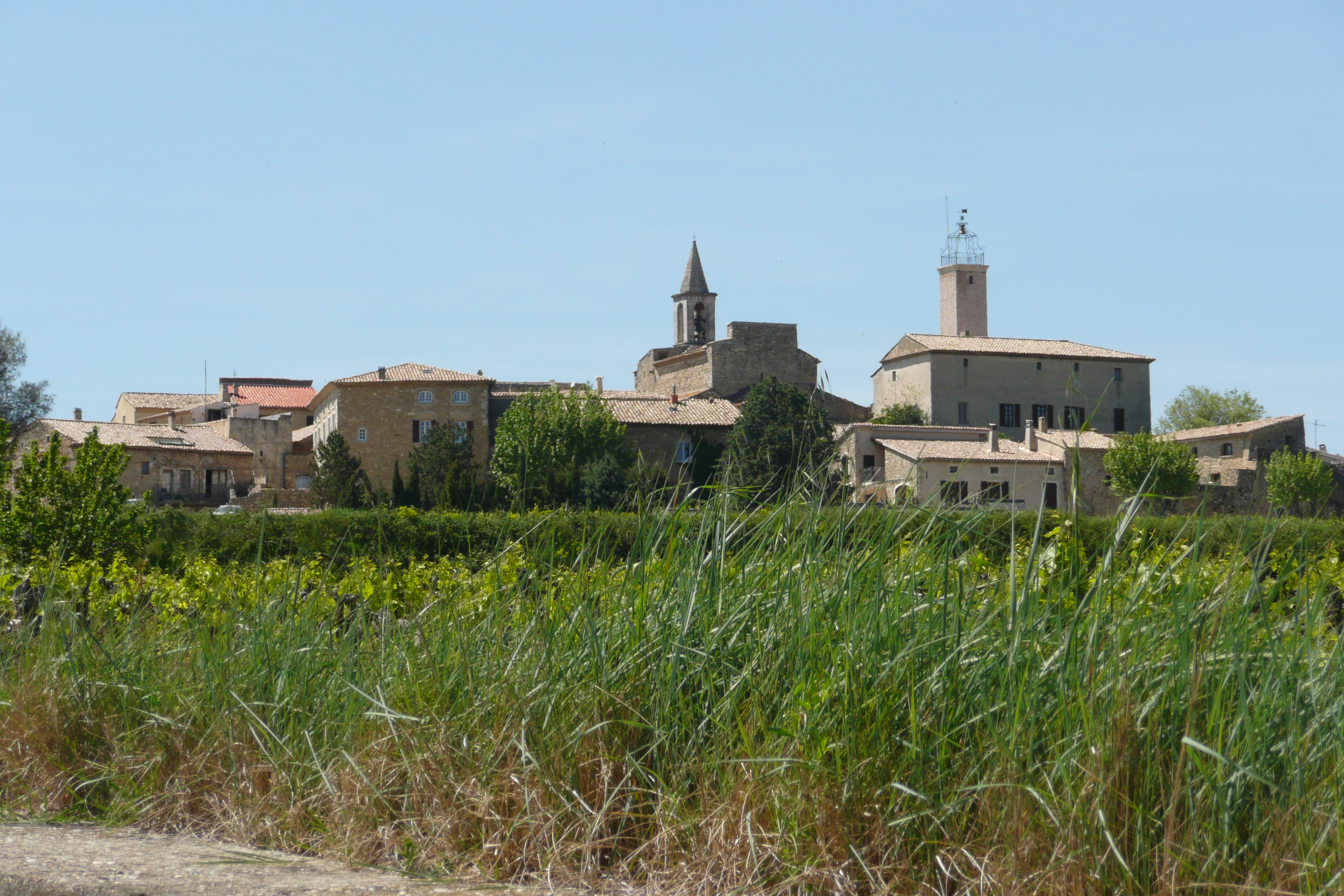
- A general view of Saint-Alexandre

- Coat of arms
- Location of Saint-Alexandre
- Location within France Location within Occitanie
- Coordinates: 44°13′43″N 4°37′19″E
- Country: France
- Region: Occitania
- Department: Gard
- Arrondissement: Nîmes
- Canton: Pont-Saint-Esprit
- Intercommunality: CA Gard Rhodanien

Government
  - Mayor (2020–2026): Jacques Bertolini
- Area^{1}: 12.87 km^{2} (4.97 sq mi)
- Elevation: 64 m (210 ft)
- Highest elevation: 270 m (890 ft)
- Lowest elevation: 34 m (112 ft)
- Population (2023): 1,245
  - Density: 96.74/km^{2} (250.5/sq mi)
- Time zone: UTC+01:00 (CET)
  - Summer (DST): UTC+02:00 (CEST)
- INSEE/Postal code: 30226 /30130
- ^{1} French Land Register data, which excludes lakes, ponds, glaciers > 1 km^{2} (0.386 sq mi or 247 acres) and river estuaries.

Saint-Alexandre (French pronunciation: [sɛ̃.t‿alɛksɑ̃dʁ]; Occitan: Sent Alexandre) is a commune in the Gard department in southern France.

== Population ==
Historical population
Year	Pop.	±% p.a.
1968	517	—
1975	522	+0.14%
1982	664	+3.50%
1990	955	+4.65%
1999	978	+0.26%
2007	1,082	+1.27%
2012	1,113	+0.57%
2017	1,232	+2.05%
2023	1,245	+0.18%
Source: INSEE

== See also ==
- Communes of the Gard department
