= Montclus, Gard =

Montclus
- Commune
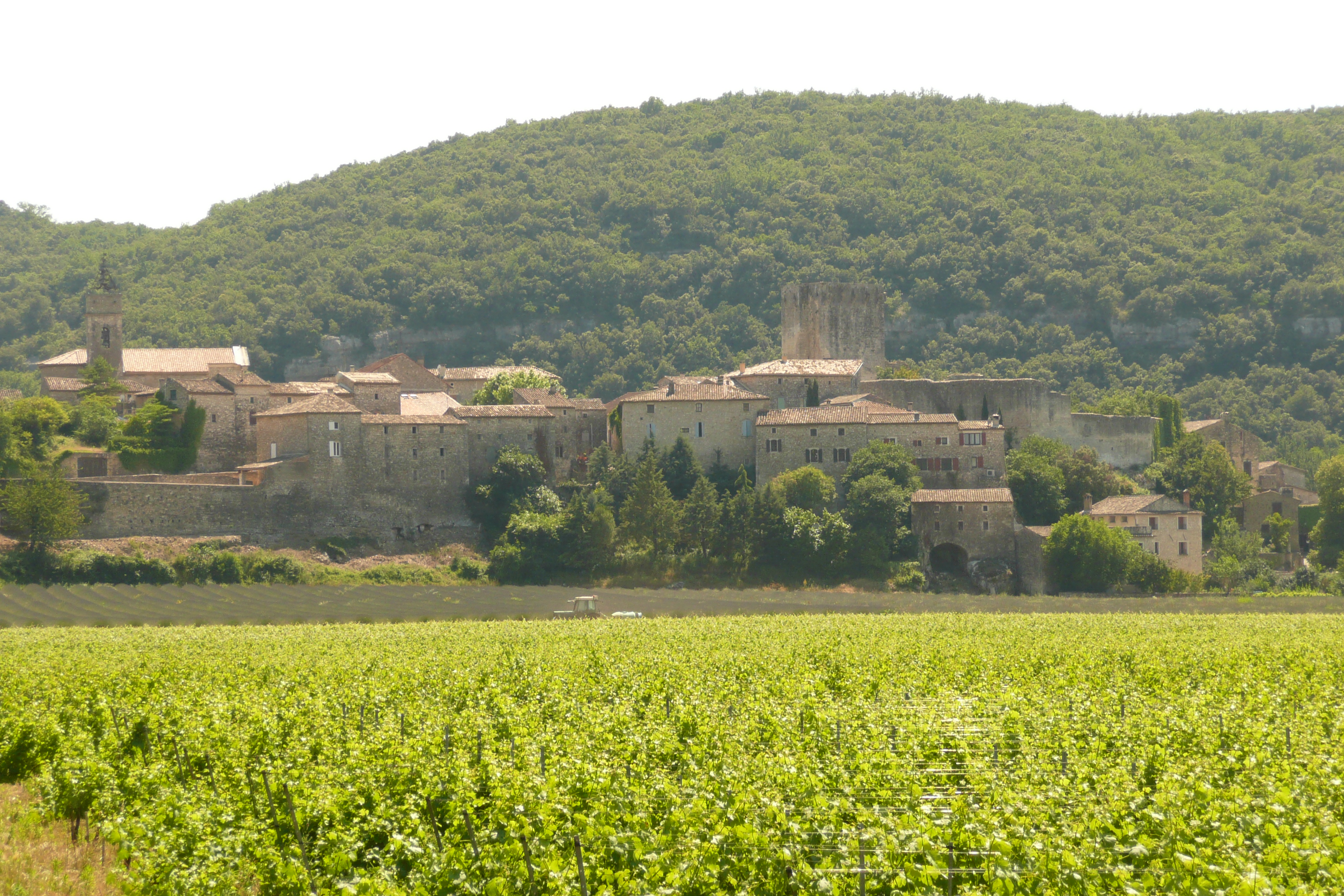
- Distant view of Montclus with vineyards

- Coat of arms
- Location of Montclus
- Location within France Location within Occitanie
- Coordinates: 44°15′41″N 4°25′14″E
- Country: France
- Region: Occitania
- Department: Gard
- Arrondissement: Nîmes
- Canton: Pont-Saint-Esprit
- Intercommunality: CA Gard Rhodanien

Government
  - Mayor (2020–2026): Benoit Trichot
- Area^{1}: 21.88 km^{2} (8.45 sq mi)
- Elevation: 80 m (260 ft)
- Highest elevation: 329 m (1,079 ft)
- Lowest elevation: 76 m (249 ft)
- Population (2023): 179
  - Density: 8.18/km^{2} (21.2/sq mi)
- Time zone: UTC+01:00 (CET)
  - Summer (DST): UTC+02:00 (CEST)
- INSEE/Postal code: 30175 /30630
- ^{1} French Land Register data, which excludes lakes, ponds, glaciers > 1 km^{2} (0.386 sq mi or 247 acres) and river estuaries.

Montclus is a commune in the Gard department in southern France. It is a member of Les Plus Beaux Villages de France (The Most Beautiful Villages of France) Association.

== Geography ==
=== Climate ===
Montclus has a hot-summer Mediterranean climate (Köppen climate classification Csa). The average annual temperature in Montclus is 13.7 °C (56.7 °F). The average annual rainfall is 951.2 mm (37.45 in) with November as the wettest month. The temperatures are highest on average in July, at around 23.2 °C (73.8 °F), and lowest in January, at around 5.2 °C (41.4 °F). The highest temperature ever recorded in Montclus was 43.8 °C (110.8 °F) on 27 June 2019; the coldest temperature ever recorded was −14.0 °C (6.8 °F) on 16 January 1985.

Climate data for Montclus (1991−2020 normals, extremes 1978−present)
Month	Jan	Feb	Mar	Apr	May	Jun	Jul	Aug	Sep	Oct	Nov	Dec	Year
Record high °C (°F)	23.9 (75.0)	25.9 (78.6)	28.0 (82.4)	31.2 (88.2)	36.3 (97.3)	43.8 (110.8)	41.3 (106.3)	42.9 (109.2)	37.7 (99.9)	32.0 (89.6)	24.6 (76.3)	21.0 (69.8)	43.8 (110.8)
Mean daily maximum °C (°F)	10.3 (50.5)	12.2 (54.0)	16.6 (61.9)	19.6 (67.3)	23.7 (74.7)	28.3 (82.9)	31.6 (88.9)	31.2 (88.2)	25.8 (78.4)	20.0 (68.0)	14.2 (57.6)	10.7 (51.3)	20.4 (68.7)
Daily mean °C (°F)	5.2 (41.4)	6.2 (43.2)	9.7 (49.5)	12.5 (54.5)	16.4 (61.5)	20.5 (68.9)	23.2 (73.8)	22.9 (73.2)	18.6 (65.5)	14.3 (57.7)	9.1 (48.4)	5.8 (42.4)	13.7 (56.7)
Mean daily minimum °C (°F)	0.0 (32.0)	0.2 (32.4)	2.8 (37.0)	5.5 (41.9)	9.1 (48.4)	12.8 (55.0)	14.9 (58.8)	14.7 (58.5)	11.4 (52.5)	8.6 (47.5)	4.0 (39.2)	0.9 (33.6)	7.1 (44.8)
Record low °C (°F)	−14.0 (6.8)	−10.9 (12.4)	−13.1 (8.4)	−5.5 (22.1)	−2.0 (28.4)	3.0 (37.4)	6.0 (42.8)	5.0 (41.0)	1.0 (33.8)	−4.0 (24.8)	−9.0 (15.8)	−11.4 (11.5)	−14.0 (6.8)
Average precipitation mm (inches)	76.8 (3.02)	48.8 (1.92)	54.9 (2.16)	75.4 (2.97)	75.2 (2.96)	49.9 (1.96)	44.4 (1.75)	59.8 (2.35)	132.4 (5.21)	131.6 (5.18)	134.1 (5.28)	67.9 (2.67)	951.2 (37.45)
Average precipitation days (≥ 1.0 mm)	6.5	5.2	5.2	7.4	7.5	5.4	4.1	4.8	6.0	7.9	8.2	6.7	75.0
Source: Météo-France

== Population ==
Historical population
Year	Pop.	±% p.a.
1968	124	—
1975	115	−1.07%
1982	139	+2.74%
1990	135	−0.36%
1999	134	−0.08%
2007	155	+1.84%
2012	157	+0.26%
2017	206	+5.58%
2023	179	−2.31%
Source: INSEE

== See also ==
- Communes of the Gard department
- Côtes du Vivarais AOC
