= Pin (disambiguation) =

A pin is a device used for fastening objects or material together.

Pin or PIN may also refer to:

== People ==
=== Surname "Pin" ===
- Ayah Pin (1941–2016), Malaysian cult leader
- Camille Pin (born 1981), French tennis player
- Celeste Pin (1961–2025), Italian soccer player
- Doriane Pin (born 2004), French racing driver
- Gabriele Pin (born 1962), Italian soccer player
- Jean-Éric Pin, French mathematician
- Jessica Pin, American activist

=== Given name "Pin" ===
- Haing Pin (1942–2020), Cambodian Khmer Rouge leader
- Luo Pin (1733–1799; Chinese: 羅聘), Chinese Qing Dynasty painter
- Lu Pin (disambiguation), several people
- Pin Malakul (1903–1995), Thai educator
- Mun Pin (1998–2023; Korean: 문빈), South Korean entertainer
- Sun Pin (3rd century BCE), Chinese Warring States era general
- Ts'ao Pin (931–999; Chinese: 曹彬), Chinese general
- Wang Pin (born 1974; Chinese: 王频), chess player
- Wen Pin (3rd century CE), Chinese Three Kingdoms era general
- Wu Pin (16th century CE; Chinese: 吳彬), Chinese Ming Dynasty landscape painter
- Yu Pin (disambiguation), several people
- Paul Yu Pin (1901–1978; Chinese: 于斌, Yu Pin), Chinese Catholic cardinal

== Places ==
- Le Pin (disambiguation) (French: The Pin, The Pine), several places
- Pin, Haute-Saône, a place in France

== Arts and entertainment ==
=== Music ===
- Pin (harp), a Cambodian musical instrument
- "Pin", a song by Yeah Yeah Yeahs from the 2003 album Fever to Tell
- "Pin", a song by Grimes from the 2015 album Art Angels
- "The Pin", a song by Goo Goo Dolls from the 2016 album Boxes
- "Pin", a song by Anuel AA from the 2021 album Las Leyendas Nunca Mueren

=== Other uses in arts and entertainment ===
- Pin (film), a 1988 Canadian horror film
- Pin (novel), a 1981 American gothic horror thriller novel by Andrew Neiderman
- The Pin (comedy act), on BBC Radio 4
- Pin, a character from the first season of Battle for Dream Island, an animated web series

== Science and technology ==
- Pin (computer program), a platform for creating analysis tools
- Pin (electronics), a short lead
- Pin, an image on Pinterest social media service
- Pin, to attach programs or files to a taskbar in a graphical user interface
- Personal identification number, or PIN, a numeric passcode
- PIN diode, a semiconductor device
- PIN proteins, integral membrane proteins in plants
- Preferred IUPAC name (PIN), a unique chemical name
- Prostatic intraepithelial neoplasia (PIN), an abnormality of prostatic glands

== Sports and games ==
- Pin (amateur wrestling), a grappling hold that ends a match
- Pin (professional wrestling), a wrestling move
- Pin (bridge), a maneuver in the game of bridge
- Pin (chess), a chess tactic
- Bowling pin, the target of a bowling ball

== Other uses ==
- Piame language (ISO 639 language code pin)
- Pin, a cask size of half a firkin in English brewery cask units
- PIN (debit card), a Dutch debit card brand
- PIN Group, a German postal company
- Paleontological Institute, Russian Academy of Sciences (PIN), Moscow, Russia
- Paramount International Networks, a division of media company Paramount Global
- People in Need (PIN), a Czech non-profit organization
- Police Information Notice (PIN), issued under the UK Protection from Harassment Act 1997
- Postal code, or PIN, a series of digits or letters used in a postal address
  - Postal Index Number, in India
  - Known as ZIP Code, the numeric postal code in US and its territories
- Pinxit, abbreviated PIN, added to the signature of a painter
- Public Integrity Section, a section of the U.S. Department of Justice's Criminal Division
- Award pin, recognising an achievement
- Lapel pin, a small pin worn on clothing
- Google Maps pin, an inverted-teardrop symbol used on map apps such as Google Maps to mark a location

== See also ==
- Pins (disambiguation)
- Hairpin (disambiguation)
- Kingpin (disambiguation)
- Pinhead (disambiguation)
- Pinning (disambiguation)
- PIN Group (disambiguation)
- Pin-up (disambiguation)
- Push pin (disambiguation)
- Bridge pin, on a keyboard musical instrument
- Dowel, a cylindrical shape made of wood, plastic, or metal
- Pinacol, a white solid organic compound
