= Pins (disambiguation) =

Pins are devices used for fastening objects or fabrics together.

PINS or Pins may also refer to:

- PINS (band), an English rock group
- Person in need of supervision, a juvenile not living with a parent or guardian, in the U.S.
- Planning Inspectorate for England (PINS), a British government agency
- Pinterest, stock ticker PINS
- Les Pins, a commune in Charente, France
- Jacob Pins (1917-2005), German-born Israeli artist and collector
- Odon de Pins (died 1296), Grand Master of the Knights Hospitaller

== See also ==
- , including many placenames ending in -les-pins
- Pin (disambiguation)
- Pins and Needles (disambiguation)
- Île des pins, an island in the Pacific Ocean
- L'Île-des-Pins, a commune in New Caledonia, Pacific Ocean
- Lac des Pins (Aumond, Quebec), a lake in Canada
- Pointe aux Pins, a peninsula in Lake Erie, Canada
- Pointe Aux Pins, Michigan, an unincorporated community in Bois Blanc Township, Michigan, United States
- Rivière aux Pins (disambiguation), several rivers
- Rivière des Pins (disambiguation), several rivers
