= Kingpin =

Kingpin or king pin may refer to:

== Vehicular part ==
- Kingpin (automotive part), the pivot in the steering mechanism
  - The central bolt of a skateboard, axle assembly ("truck"), around which the rest of the mechanism can flex, allowing the rider to steer by shifting body weight
  - The pivot or connector between a tractor and trailer in the fifth-wheel coupling of semi-trailer truck
- The pivot in a railway car bogie

== Crime ==
- Crime boss, in organized crime
  - Drug lord, a type of crime boss

== Literature ==
- Kingpin (book), written by former hacker Kevin Poulsen
- Kingpin (chess magazine) published in Britain
- Kingpin (character), 1967 comic book character from The Amazing Spider-Man
- Spider-Bitch (Ashley Barton), comic book character, alternate version of Kingpin on Earth-807128/21923
- Kingpin (Matt Murdock), 2014 comic book character from Spider-Gwen

== Film and television ==
- Kingpin (1985 film), New Zealand drama film by Mike Walker (1985)
- Kingpin (1996 film) sports comedy film by the Farrelly brothers, (1996)
- Kingpin (TV series), crime/drama TV miniseries (2003)

== Music ==
=== Bands ===
- Kingpin (band), Swedish metal band from the mid-1980s
- The Kingpins (Canadian band), Canadian ska band
- The Kingpins (English vocal group), English pop group of the 1950s and 1960s
- The Kingpins, band of King Curtis that frequently backed Aretha Franklin
- The Kingpins, London band, toured with Albert Lee in 1969
- The King Pins, American R&B vocal group, also known as the Kelly Brothers

=== Albums ===
- Kingpin (1996 film), soundtrack to the 1996 film of the same name
- The Kingpin (album), album by Craig G (1989)
- Kingpin (Tinsley Ellis album), album by Tinsley Ellis (2000)

=== Songs ===
- "Kingpin", song from the Wilco album Being There

== Video games ==
- Kingpin: Life of Crime, video game (1999)
- Kingpin: Reloaded, video game (2023)
- Spider-Man vs. The Kingpin, video game (1991)

== See also ==
- Joe Grand, American hardware hacker known as Kingpin
- Kingpin Bowling, lounge bars in Australia
- Operation Kingpin (disambiguation)
- KPRA (disambiguation)
