= Pinner (disambiguation) =

Pinner is a suburb in north-west London, England.

Pinner may also refer to:

== People ==
- Adolf Pinner (1842-1909), German Jewish chemist
- Alfred Pinner (1891–1976), British gymnast
- Artose Pinner (born 1978), American football player
- David Pinner (born 1940), British actor and novelist
- George Pinner (born 1987), English hockey player
- Harry Pinner (born 1956), English rugby league player
- Mike Pinner (1934–2023), English footballer
- Neil Pinner (born 1990), English cricketer
- Shaun Pinner (born 1974), former soldier of the British Army who joined the Ukrainian Armed Forces
- Ulrich Pinner (born 1954), German tennis player
- William Pinner (1877–1944), English cricketer
- Pinball Clemons (born 1965), nicknamed Pinner, Canadian football player

== Other uses ==
- Pinner (ward), an electoral ward of Harrow London Borough Council that had existed since 1978
- Pinner F.C., a football club based in Pinner, England
- Harry Pinner, a fictional character in The Adventure of the Stockbroker's Clerk
- Pinner reaction, an organic reaction
- Pinners, a neighborhood game

== See also ==
- Pin (disambiguation)
- Pinning (disambiguation)
