= Justin Gensoul =

French playwright and chansonnier

Justin Gensoul (22 February 1781, in Connaux – 25 February 1848, in Paris) was a 19th-century French playwright and chansonnier.

Gensoul also authored his plays under his sole first name "Justin".

== Works ==
- L'Aigle et la colombe, 1811;
- Almanach des Muses, Paris
- Arlequin à Alger, comédie-parade in 1 act and in vaudevilles, with Rougement, Paris, Vaudeville, 25 April 1807;
- Le baiser au porteur, vaudeville in 1 act with Eugène Scribe and de Courcy, 1824;
- Blanche;
- Chacun son tour, opera in 1 act, music by Solié;
- Le Congé, ou la Veille des noces, comédie-vaudeville in 1 act and in prose, with Rougement, Paris, Vaudeville, 15 March 1810;
- Le Coureur d'héritages, comedy in 3 acts and in verses
- Les Deux mousquetaires, ou la Robe de chambre, opéra comique in 1 act, with J.-C. Vial. music by M. Berton. Paris, Opéra-comique, 22 December 1824
- Le Français à Venise, opéra comique in 1 act, music by M. Nicolo, de Malthe. Paris, Opéra-comique, 14 June 1813
- Lord Davenant, drama in 4 acts and in prose, with J.-B.-C. Vial and Milcent. Paris, Théâtre-français, 8 October 1825
- Le Ménage de Molière, 1 act comedy in verse, with A.-N. Naudet, Paris, 1822
- Mon premier pas, 1803
- Nadir et Sélim, ou les Deux artistes, opera comique in 3 acts, music by M. Romagnesi, Paris, Opéra-comique, 27 July 1822;
- Philocles, opera in 2 acts, music by Dourlen, 1806
- Le Projet singulier, comedy in 1 act and in verses, Paris, Théâtre de l'Impératrice, 2 germinal an XIII (1805);
- Prologue pour l'ouverture du nouveau théâtre de Semur
- Société d'émulation de Cambrai. Concours de poésie. [Épître sur le théâtre, par M. Justin Gensoul. Le Fugitif, by S. Henri Berthoud. Sur l'entrée de S. A. R. Mgr le duc d'Angoulême in Spain, by M. Alphonse Flavol.] Séance publique 16 August 1823
- Le Tardif, comedy in 1 act and in verses, Paris, Théâtre-français, 8 December 1824
- Le Valet intrigué, comedy in prose, Paris, Odéon, 10 March 1812.

== Some songs ==
- Le Baiser du matin
- La table
- L'angélus
- Le bon mari
- Le premier voyage
