= Pine River Township =

Pine River Township may refer to the following places in the United States:

- Pine River Township, Michigan
- Pine River Township, Minnesota

== See also ==
- Pine River (disambiguation)
