= Piepenburg =

Piepenburg is a German surname. Notable people with the surname include:

- Horst Piepenburg (born 1954), German jurist
- Jürgen Piepenburg (1941–2025), German football player and manager

== See also ==
- Piepenburg, former German name of Wyszogóra, a village in Gryfice County, Poland
