= Pine River, Quebec =

Pine River may refer to:

- Rivière aux Pins (disambiguation)
- Rivière des Pins (disambiguation)
