= Le Pin =

Le Pin (French for the pine) is the name or part of the name of several communes in France:

- Le Pin, Allier, in the Allier département
- Le Pin, Calvados, in the Calvados département
- Le Pin, Charente-Maritime, in the Charente-Maritime département
- Le Pin, Deux-Sèvres, in the Deux-Sèvres département
- Le Pin, Gard, in the Gard département
- Le Pin, Isère, in the Isère département
- Le Pin, Jura, in the Jura département
- Le Pin, Loire-Atlantique, in the Loire-Atlantique département
- Le Pin, Seine-et-Marne, in the Seine-et-Marne département
- Le Pin, Tarn-et-Garonne, in the Tarn-et-Garonne département
- Le Pin-au-Haras, in the Orne département
- Le Pin-en-Mauges, in the Maine-et-Loire département
- Le Pin-la-Garenne, in the Orne département
- Le Pin-Murelet, in the Haute-Garonne département

== Other uses ==
- Château Le Pin, a winery in the Gironde département, commune and appellation of Pomerol

== See also ==
- Les Pins, a commune in Charente, France
- Pin (disambiguation)
