= Gaujac, Gard =

Gaujac
- Commune
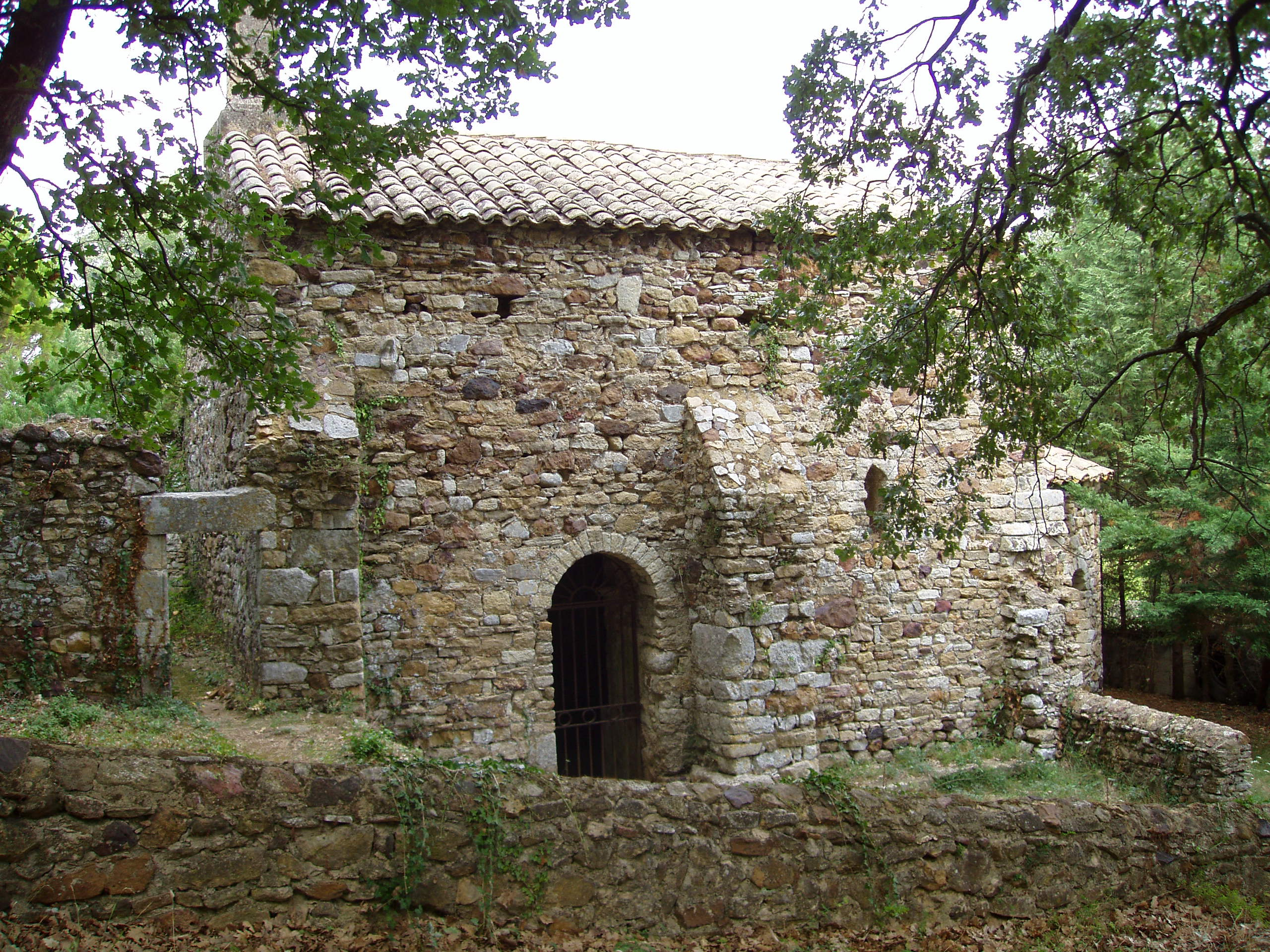
- Saint-Saturnin chapel

- Coat of arms
- Location of Gaujac
- Location within France Location within Occitanie
- Coordinates: 44°04′47″N 4°34′45″E
- Country: France
- Region: Occitania
- Department: Gard
- Arrondissement: Nîmes
- Canton: Bagnols-sur-Cèze
- Intercommunality: CA Gard Rhodanien

Government
  - Mayor (2020–2026): Maria Seube
- Area^{1}: 10.28 km^{2} (3.97 sq mi)
- Elevation: 144 m (472 ft)
- Highest elevation: 264 m (866 ft)
- Lowest elevation: 85 m (279 ft)
- Population (2023): 1,129
  - Density: 109.8/km^{2} (284.4/sq mi)
- Time zone: UTC+01:00 (CET)
  - Summer (DST): UTC+02:00 (CEST)
- INSEE/Postal code: 30127 /30330
- ^{1} French Land Register data, which excludes lakes, ponds, glaciers > 1 km^{2} (0.386 sq mi or 247 acres) and river estuaries.

Gaujac (French pronunciation: [ɡoʒak]) is a commune in the Gard department in southern France.

== Population ==
Historical population
Year	Pop.	±% p.a.
1968	280	—
1975	278	−0.10%
1982	433	+6.53%
1990	596	+4.07%
1999	643	+0.85%
2007	918	+4.55%
2012	1,054	+2.80%
2017	1,096	+0.78%
2023	1,129	+0.50%
Source: INSEE

== See also ==
- Communes of the Gard department
