= Saint-Étienne-des-Sorts =

- Commune
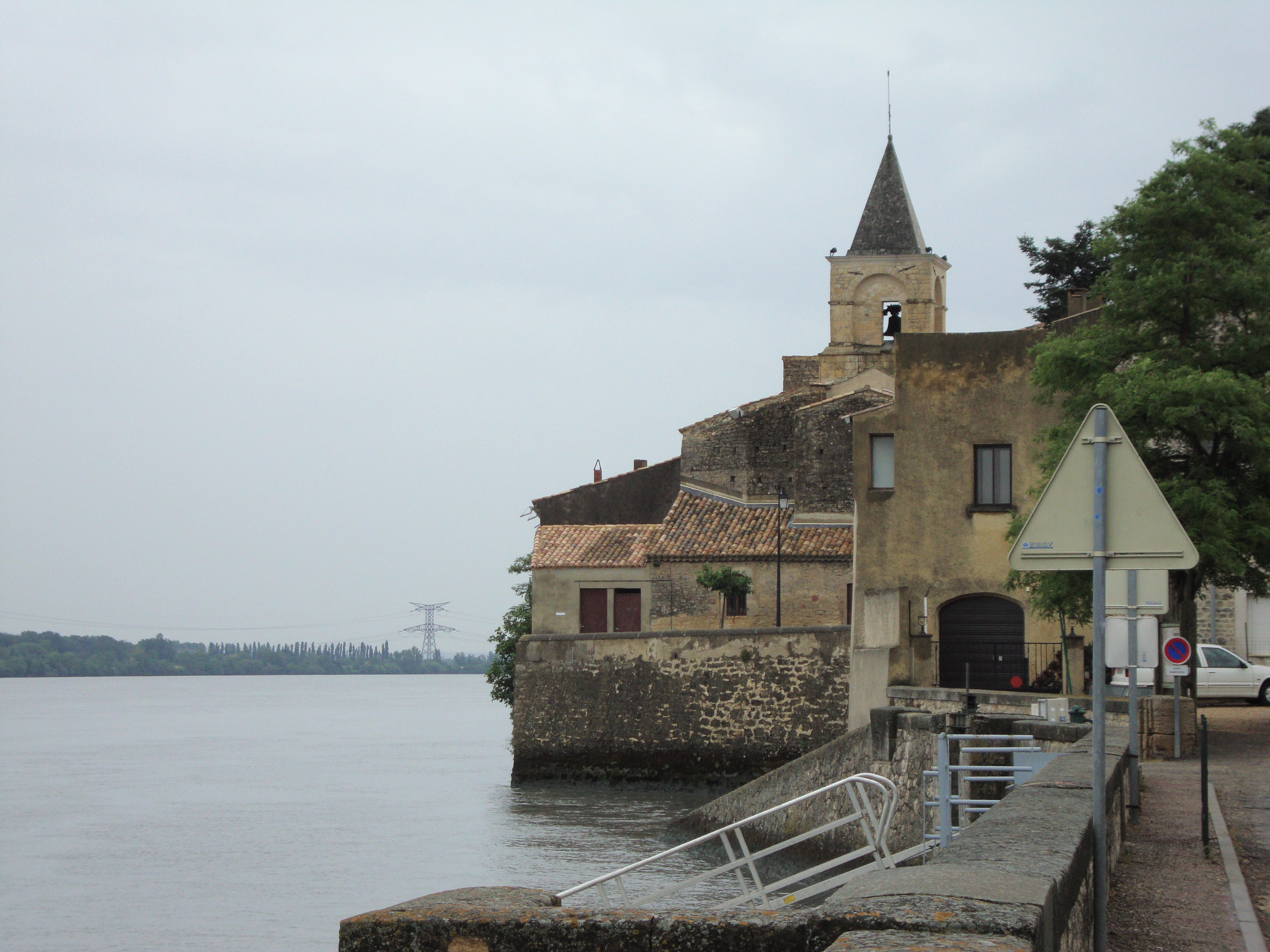
- The village on the bank of the Rhône

- Coat of arms
- Location of Saint-Étienne-des-Sorts
- Location within France Location within Occitanie
- Coordinates: 44°11′17″N 4°42′25″E
- Country: France
- Region: Occitania
- Department: Gard
- Arrondissement: Nîmes
- Canton: Bagnols-sur-Cèze
- Intercommunality: CA Gard Rhodanien

Government
  - Mayor (2024–2026): Stéphane Marcellin
- Area^{1}: 9.85 km^{2} (3.80 sq mi)
- Elevation: 30 m (98 ft)
- Highest elevation: 219 m (719 ft)
- Lowest elevation: 26 m (85 ft)
- Population (2023): 545
  - Density: 55.3/km^{2} (143/sq mi)
- Time zone: UTC+01:00 (CET)
  - Summer (DST): UTC+02:00 (CEST)
- INSEE/Postal code: 30251 /30200
- ^{1} French Land Register data, which excludes lakes, ponds, glaciers > 1 km^{2} (0.386 sq mi or 247 acres) and river estuaries.

Saint-Étienne-des-Sorts (French pronunciation: [sɛ̃.t‿etjɛn de sɔʁ]; Provençal: Sent Estève dei Sòrbs) is a commune in the Gard department in southern France.

== Population ==
Historical population
Year	Pop.	±% p.a.
1968	536	—
1975	444	−2.65%
1982	432	−0.39%
1990	413	−0.56%
1999	486	+1.82%
2007	503	+0.43%
2012	527	+0.94%
2017	557	+1.11%
2023	545	−0.36%
Source: INSEE

== See also ==
- Communes of the Gard department
