= Bob Kames =

- Birth name: Robert Kujawa
- Born: April 21, 1925
- Died: April 9, 2008 (aged 82)
- Genres: Polka
- Occupations: Musician; singer; songwriter
- Instruments: Piano; organ; chimes
- Labels: Chess; King; GNP

Bob Kames (April 21, 1925 – April 9, 2008) was an American musician who specialized in genres such as polka. Kames is credited with developing and popularizing the modern-day version of the song "Dance Little Bird," which is much better known by its more common name, The Chicken Dance. Kames is a member of the Wisconsin Area Music Industry's Hall of Fame.

Kames recorded over seventy albums throughout his career. He owned and operated a chain of music stores called Bob Kames Wonderful World of Music, based in Milwaukee, Wisconsin.

== Early life ==
Kames was born Robert Kujawa to his parents Valentine Kujawa and Esther Kujawa. His father worked as an alderman in Milwaukee's south side. He began playing the piano when he was 12 years old.

Kames was drafted into the United States Army during World War II. He was a member of the service for approximately one year, when an army chaplain heard his playing the piano. The chaplain reportedly asked Kames if he could play the organ. He did not know how to play this instrument, but decided to give it a try. As result, Kames earned his first job in music as both the Army chapel organist, as well as the chaplain's full-time assistant.

Kames earned his stage name, Bob Kames, when an announcer on Armed Forces Radio could not pronounce Kujawa. Kames also began playing for United States troops during the war. For example, he performed as an accompanist USO dancer named Edith Campbell in 1945.

Kames and Campbell later married in 1955. Their legal married name remained Kujawa, though the couple became known as Bob and Edith Kames.

== Career ==
Kames returned to Milwaukee after World War II. He bought a Hammond organ and continued to record independently. He composed his first pop song, You Are My One True Love, in 1949, which was based on a Polish folk song. Kames released the song through a Wisconsin record company, as he was rejected by the major record labels. He paid for the first 5,000 copies himself. His luck changed when the song was picked up by London Records, an English record label. The song became a hit, selling over a million copies, and was later recorded by Frankie Yankovic and Lawrence Welk.

Kames' music producer first heard "Dance Little Bird" at a German music fair in 1982. The producer sent Kames a copy of the song, who recorded his own version, known as "The Chicken Dance". He released it in 1982. The song hit solid gold when it was released in 1983 in Poland, selling 300,000 copies. He received 2 of the 35 cents from each sale. Since he could not take the money out of the country, he donated all of it to for a relief fund. The success of the song stunned Kames. He commented in a 1995 interview, "This stupid little thing, it's infectious. It has only two chords, it doesn't even change for the bridge. It implants the melody in people's minds—it just sticks in there. That's gotta be the secret...It just keeps on going. People come up to me at jobs and tell me how happy it makes them. You get a song like this once in a lifetime."

Kames released a string of successful albums, including Happy Organ. His recording success eventually led to television. Kames began producing his first television show, The Bob Kames Family Room, in 1966. He made several family-oriented television specials over the next 17 years. His guests included Bobby Vinton, Don Ho, Hildegarde, Frankie Yankovic and Lawrence Welk. he also performed for a short time with the Lawrence Welk Orchestra. Kames performed at numerous festivals, including Summerfest, Festa Italiana, Polish Fest, and Rainbow Summer.

Kames was hospitalized with a serious case of stomach ulcers in the mid-1960s. Doctors had to completely remove his stomach. In 1968, Kames took his family to Disneyland following his recovery. His trip to Disneyland inspired Kames to record the theme song to the Disney ride It's a Small World. Kames personally asked Walt Disney for permission to record the song, which Disney granted. Kames became one of the first non-Disney employees to record a version of the song. This was absolutely incredible at the time, as Walt Disney passed in December 1966. Kames and wife, would dine with Frankie Yankovic and his Yanks at the Barth's and the Bridge Restaurant in Cedarburg, Wisconsin a suburban village north of Milwaukee in 1993 and dine on steak and lobster, known as 'surf and turf', which was most incredible if you are to believe that Kames had his entire stomach removed, from ulcers. Simply, a second miracle.

== Death ==
Kames suffered from Alzheimer's disease and prostate cancer when he died on April 9, 2008. He was survived by his son, Bob Jr, John; and his grandchildren, Brian, Wendy and Rebecca. Kames' wife, Edith, died in 2005, and daughter Barbara died in 2001.

== Discography ==
Kames recorded over 70 albums in his career.

- Bob Kames in a German Beer Garden, 1960 (Chess)
- Dance Little Bird, 1992 (GNP)
- Melodies of Love, 1995 (GNP)
- Songs I'm Sure You Remember, 1996 (King)
- The Enchanting Organ of Bob Kames, 1996 (King)
- Dad & the Kids (Play for Dancing) (GNP)
- Fun & Fitness Over 50 (GNP)
- The All Stars of Polkaland USA (King)
