= Yu Bin =

Yu Bin or Yu Pin may refer to:

- Paul Yu Pin (1901–1978), Cardinal and Archbishop of Nanking
- Yu Bin (painter) (born 1966), Chinese painter
- Yu Bin (Go player) (born 1967), Chinese go player
- Yu Bin (footballer) (born 1995), Chinese footballer
- Bin Yu or Yu Bin, Chinese-American statistician
