= Stator (electric machines) =

Stationary windings in a motor/generator

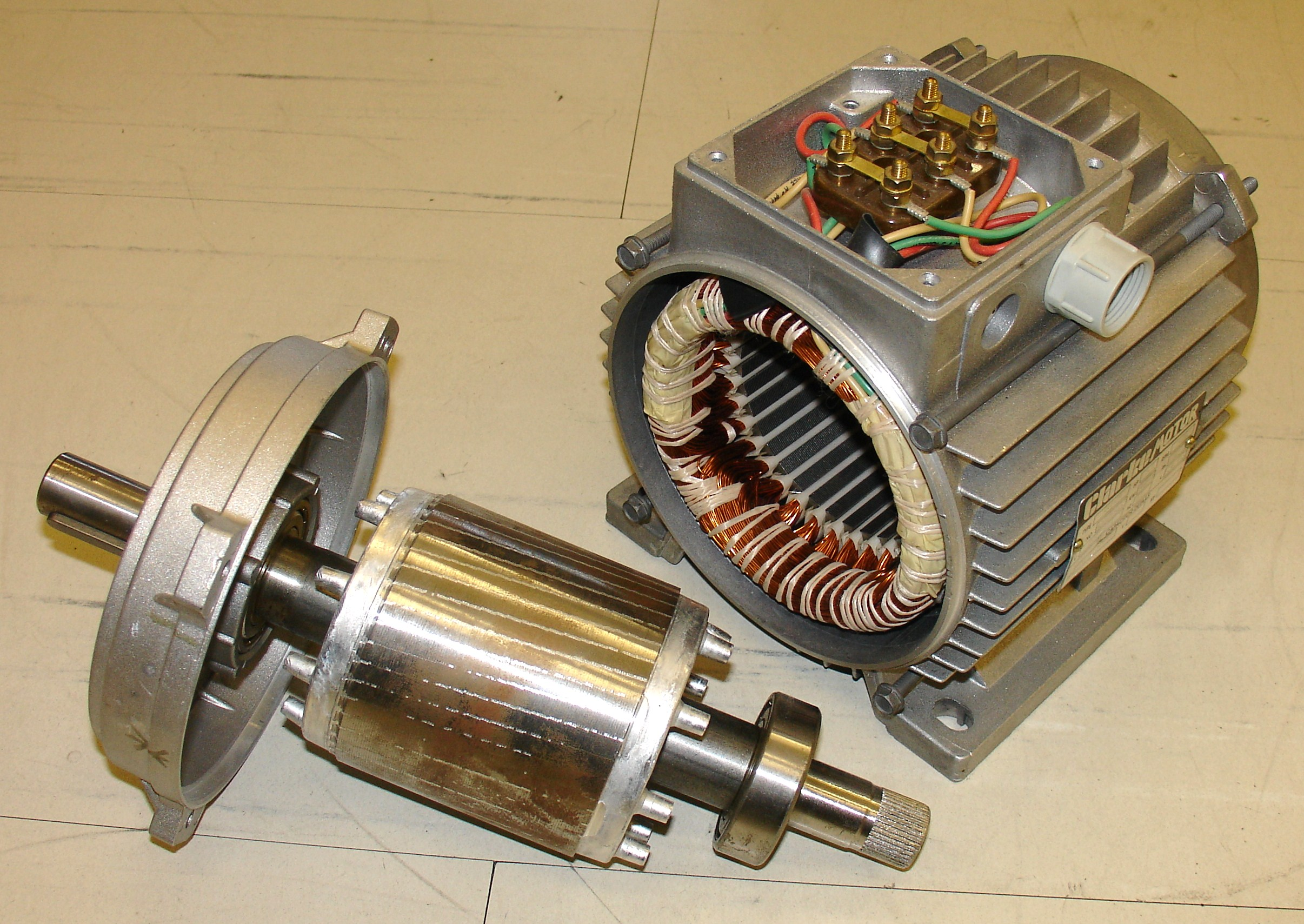
Rotor (lower left) and stator (upper right) of an electric motor

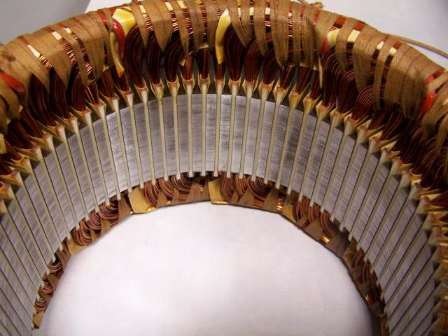
Stator of a 3-phase AC-motor

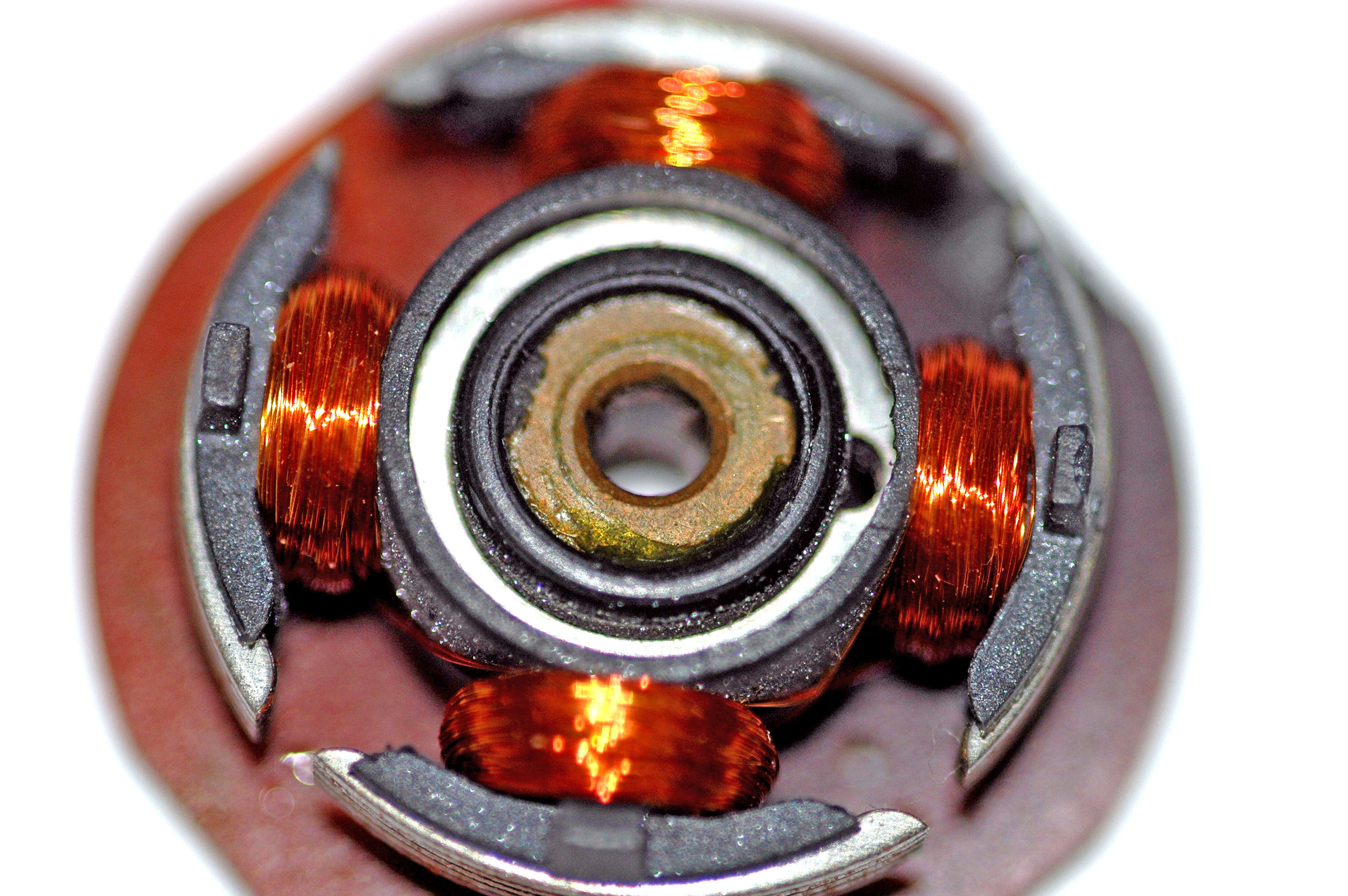
Stator of a brushless DC motor from computer cooler fan

Electric machines function through the interaction between a rotating component, the rotor, and a non-rotating component, the stator. In an electric motor, the stator provides a magnetic field that drives the rotating armature; in a generator, the stator converts the rotating magnetic field to electric current.

== Design ==
Motor stators are made either from iron/steel or from a printed circuit board (PCB). Originally applied to low-power applications, PCB stators can be lighter, smaller, and less noisy.

One design embeds thin copper traces in the PCB stator that serve as the windings. The traces are interleaved with epoxy-glass laminates, that insulate each coil from its neighbors. An air core replaces the traditional iron core, saving space and weight, and allowing a smaller air gap.

Hairpin windings may be used in the construction of electric motor stators. This technology, uses windings with wires that individually, may have larger cross sections than those used in conventional windings.

== Motors ==
Depending on the configuration of a spinning electromotive device the stator may act as the field magnet, interacting with the armature to create motion, or it may act as the armature, receiving its influence from moving field coils on the rotor. The first DC generators (known as dynamos) and DC motors put the field coils on the stator, and the power generation or motive reaction coils on the rotor. This is necessary because a continuously moving power switch known as the commutator is needed to keep the field correctly aligned across the spinning rotor. The commutator must become larger and more robust as the current increases.

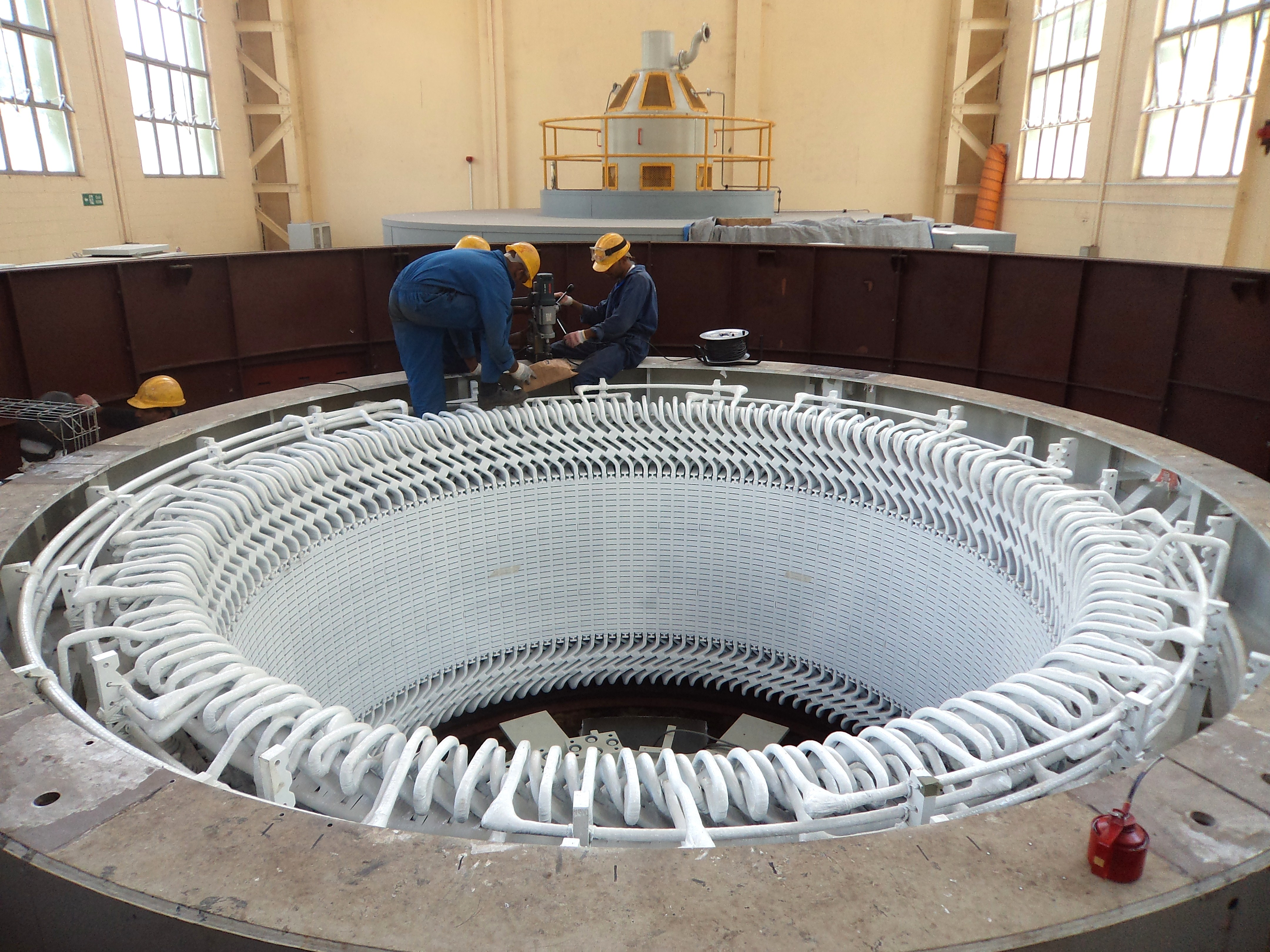
Stator winding of a generator at a hydroelectric power station.

The stator of these devices may be either a permanent magnet or an electromagnet.

An AC alternator produces power across multiple high-current power generation coils connected in parallel, eliminating the commutator.

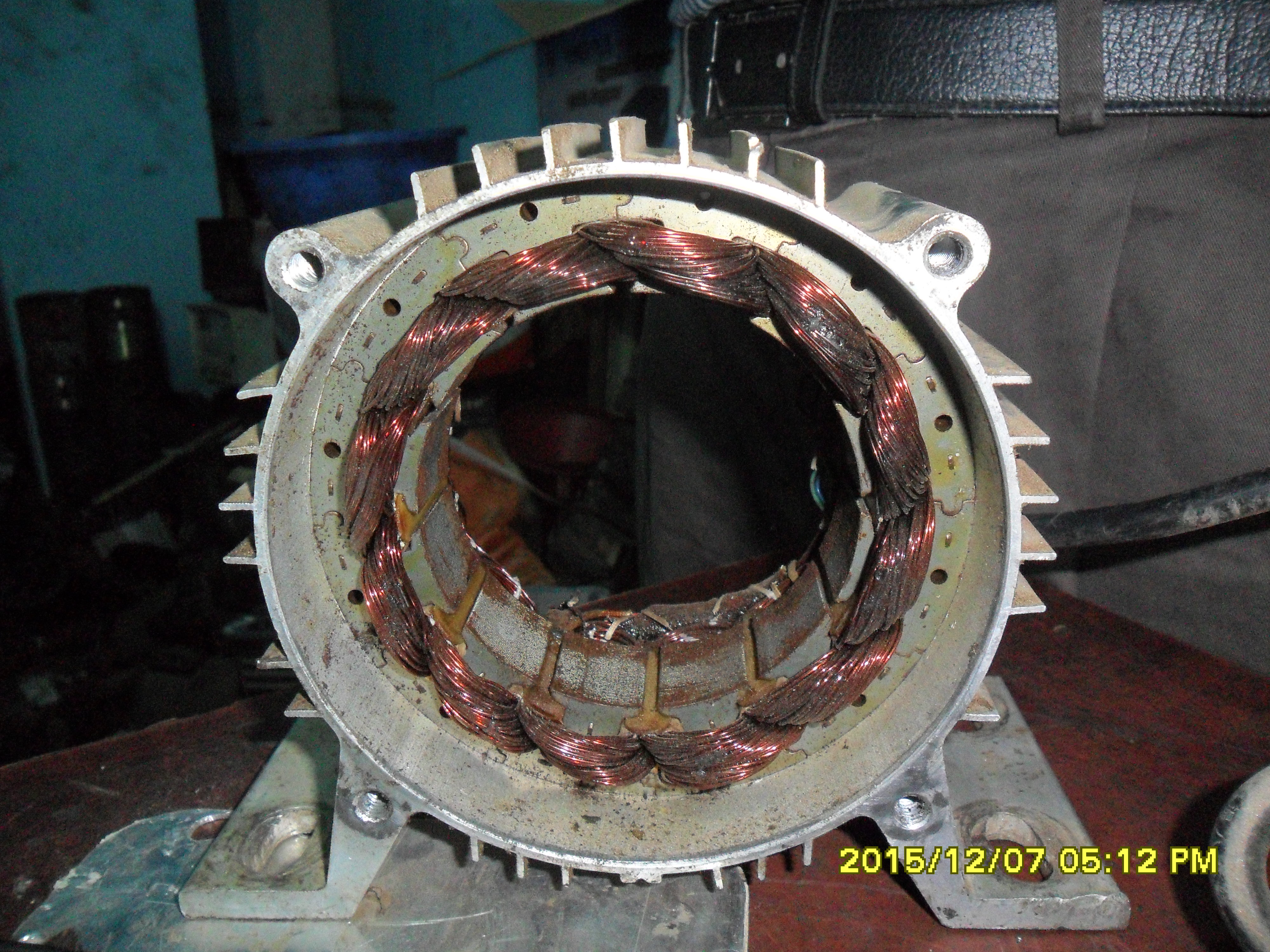
Stator of a 3-phase induction motor
