= Tresques =

- Commune
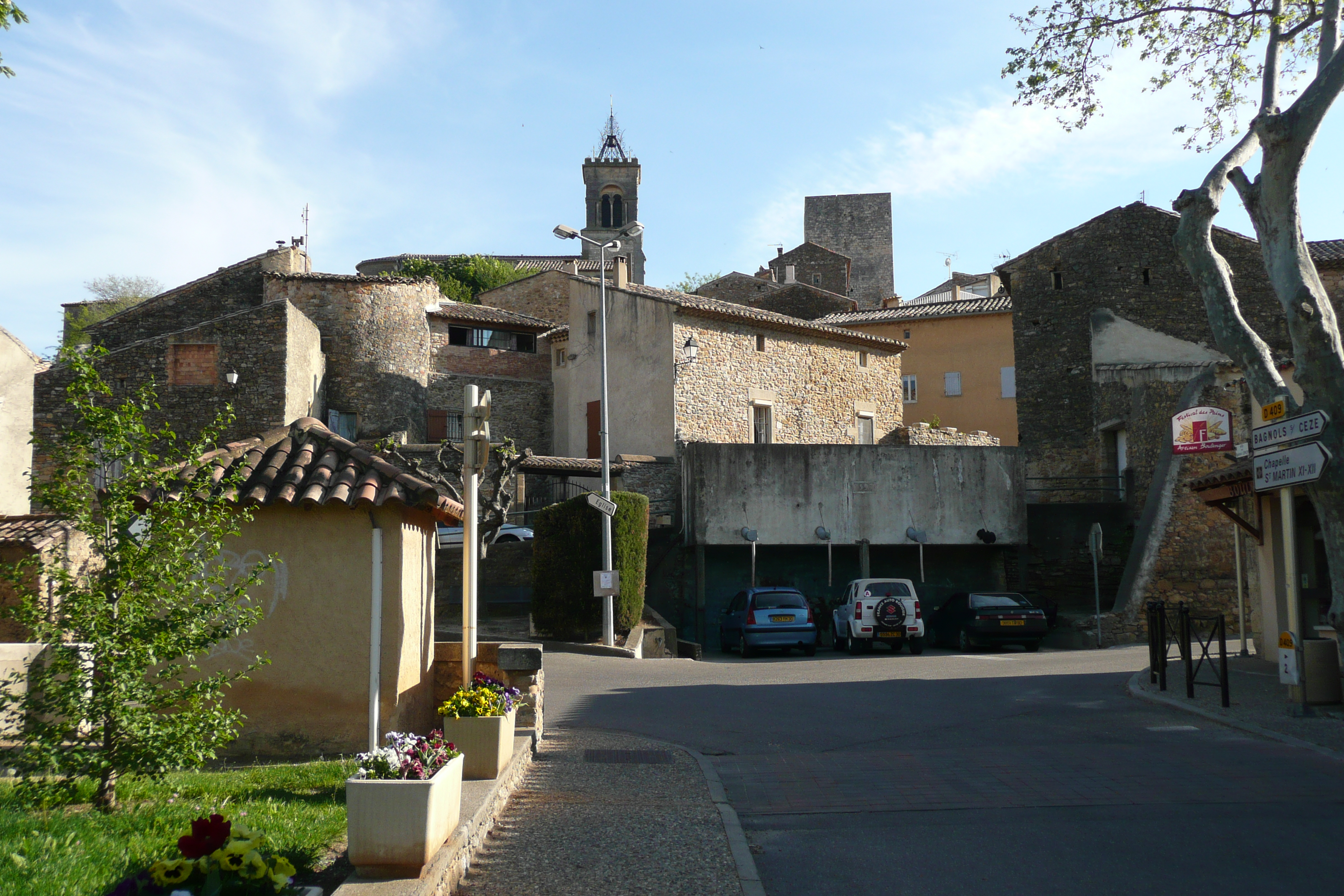
- A view of Tresques

- Coat of arms
- Location of Tresques
- Location within France Location within Occitanie
- Coordinates: 44°06′27″N 4°35′16″E
- Country: France
- Region: Occitania
- Department: Gard
- Arrondissement: Nîmes
- Canton: Bagnols-sur-Cèze
- Intercommunality: CA Gard Rhodanien

Government
  - Mayor (2020–2026): Alexandre Pissas
- Area^{1}: 17.9 km^{2} (6.9 sq mi)
- Elevation: 72 m (236 ft)
- Highest elevation: 285 m (935 ft)
- Lowest elevation: 63 m (207 ft)
- Population (2023): 1,829
  - Density: 102/km^{2} (265/sq mi)
- Time zone: UTC+01:00 (CET)
  - Summer (DST): UTC+02:00 (CEST)
- INSEE/Postal code: 30331 /30330
- ^{1} French Land Register data, which excludes lakes, ponds, glaciers > 1 km^{2} (0.386 sq mi or 247 acres) and river estuaries.

Tresques (French pronunciation: [tʁɛsk]; Occitan: Trescas) is a commune in the Gard department in southern France.

== Population ==
Historical population
Year	Pop.	±% p.a.
1968	826	—
1975	917	+1.50%
1982	1,693	+9.15%
1990	1,757	+0.46%
1999	1,744	−0.08%
2007	1,812	+0.48%
2012	1,735	−0.86%
2017	1,806	+0.81%
2023	1,829	+0.21%
Source: INSEE

== See also ==
- Communes of the Gard department
