= Canton of Bagnols-sur-Cèze =

Coordinates: 44.16°N 4.62°E

The canton of Bagnols-sur-Cèze is an administrative division of the Gard department, southern France. Its borders were modified at the French canton reorganisation which came into effect in March 2015. Its seat is in Bagnols-sur-Cèze.

It consists of the following communes:

1. Bagnols-sur-Cèze
2. Cavillargues
3. Chusclan
4. Connaux
5. Gaujac
6. Orsan
7. Le Pin
8. Sabran
9. Saint-Étienne-des-Sorts
10. Saint-Pons-la-Calm
11. Tresques
