= PIN Group (disambiguation) =

PIN Group was a German courier and postal services company. "Pin group" may also refer to:

- Pin group, subgroup of the Clifford algebra associated to a quadratic space
- The Pin Group, a New Zealand band founded by Roy Montgomery in 1980
