= Hairpin (disambiguation) =

A hairpin is a device used to hold a person's hair in place.

Hairpin or Hairpins may also refer to:

- Hairpin turn, a tight turn on a road
- Hairpin technology, a technology used in the manufacturing of electric motors
- Hairpin cotter, a formed wire fastener most commonly used in clevis pins
- Hairpin clip, a formed wire fastener designed for use in grooved shafts
- A hairpin loop, a pattern in DNA or RNA in biochemistry
- β-Hairpin, a secondary structure motif of proteins
- Hairpins (film), a 1920 film directed by Fred Niblo
- Hairpin, in music, the nickname for crescendo and decrescendo markings. See Dynamics (music)#Gradual changes
- The Devil's Hairpin, a 1957 American feature film about car racing
- Hairpin Arts Center, a community art center in Chicago
- Hairpin banksia, woody shrub.
- Hairpin Beach, a gazetted beach in Stanley, Hong Kong
- Hairpin RNA, an artificial RNA molecule
- Hairpin lace, a lace-making technique
- Hairpin ribozyme, a small section of RNA that can act as a ribozyme
- Ramsey Hairpin, a hairpin bend on the course of the Isle of Man TT Races
- The Hairpin, a women's website
- The Human Hairpin, a nickname for the American boxer, Harry Harris
- Hairpin network address translation
