= The York Brothers =

American country music duo

- George & Leslie York
- Occupation: Country music performers
- Years active: 1930s–1960s
- Labels: Universal; Decca; Mellow; Bullet; King

George (February 10, 1910 – July 1974) and Leslie York (August 23, 1917 - February 21, 1984), known professionally as The York Brothers, were an American country music duo, popular from the late 1930s through the 1950s, known for their close harmony singing. Their country boogie style, a precursor to rockabilly, combined elements of hillbilly, jazz, and blues music. Although originally from Kentucky, they are often associated with the city of Detroit, where they were based for several years, and which they paid tribute to in songs such as "Hamtramck Mama", "Detroit Hula Girl", and "Motor City Boogie".

== Biography ==
George and Leslie York were both born in Louisa, Kentucky, United States. They were raised in a musical family. After finishing 8th grade George worked as a miner in Kentucky, but eventually moved to Denver, Colorado to pursue a career as a professional musician. After singing and playing guitar with various Denver bands, George moved to Portsmouth, Ohio, where he found work at radio station WPAY. Meanwhile, Leslie (who was seven years younger than George) finished 9th grade, and won a talent contest in Lexington, Kentucky. He joined his older brother in Portsmouth, and the two soon relocated to Detroit, Michigan.

Detroit's auto industry in the late 1930s employed thousands of Southerners. Also at this time, sibling country music acts such as the Delmore Brothers and the Monroe Brothers were enjoying great popularity. Adopting "The York Brothers" as a stage name, they quickly found success as a live act in Detroit's country music taverns. In 1939 they recorded their first single, "Hamtramck Mama," which became a hit on the Detroit-based Universal label – selling some 300,000 copies in the Detroit area alone. The song's bawdy lyrics raised some protest among the politicians of the city of Hamtramck (within Detroit's borders). More successful singles followed, and in 1941 the brothers signed with Decca Records. Originally recording with just the two of them singing and playing acoustic guitars (with Leslie usually playing lead), they gradually added new instrumentation as they updated their sound.

The start of the Second World War and the resultant shortage of shellac for production of records led to most labels cutting back on releases. The York Brothers were trimmed from the Decca roster after releasing six sides, although their popularity in the Midwest and South remained strong. They began performing with an expanded group and released several records on the Detroit-based Mellow label. By the start of 1944, however, both brothers were in the Navy, with George serving in the Pacific and Leslie in Europe.

In 1946, with the war over, the brothers reunited and moved to Nashville, Tennessee. One of the few 'hillbilly acts' to successfully adapt to post-war tastes, they joined the Grand Ole Opry and signed with the new Bullet label. They released a new version of their earlier hit, "Hamtramck Mama," as well as originals and covers of popular songs. They survived the 1948 AFM recording ban with steady live work, including a six-week stint with the Louisiana Hayride, and remained with the Opry until 1950, when they returned to Detroit. While still in Nashville, George and Leslie had begun recording a long series of sides for Syd Nathan's Cincinnati-based King label, using top-notch studio musicians such as steel guitarist Jerry Byrd, guitarist Zeb Turner, and bassist Louis Innis. Many of their King efforts showed Western Swing, Latin, and R&B influences, and were consistently strong sellers. Some originals, such as "Mountain Rosa Lee", later came to be considered classics (in this case, within the bluegrass field).

The York Brothers moved to Dallas, Texas, in 1953, along with their families. There they were regularly featured on the Big D Jamboree television show, and the WFAA Shindig radio program. They continued recording, including another session for Decca in 1957. Leslie recorded some solo material for Sage Records that year. In 1963 the brothers started their own label, York Bros. Records, and released several regionally popular singles, including "Monday Morning Blues."

They eventually retired from performing, with George running a restaurant, and Leslie working various jobs. Both died in Dallas – George in 1974, and Leslie in 1984.

The Yorks were an inspiration to many others, including the Everly Brothers, who recorded the Yorks' "Long Time Gone" on their Songs Our Daddy Taught Us album.

== Discography ==
Singles (78 rpm and 45 rpm; incomplete list; release dates approximate)

1939
- Universal 105/106 Hamtramck Mama / Going Home
- Universal 107/108 Highland Park Girl / Detroit Hula Girl

1940

- Universal 126/4402 Gamblers Blues / Conscription Blues
- Universal 404/405 Sweetheart Darling / It Taint No Good

1941

- Hot Wax 105/405 Hamtramck Mama / It Taint No Good
- Decca 5933 Speak To Me Little Darling / You Took My Sunshine With You
- Decca 5943 Got Ramblin' and Gamblin' On My Mind / Naggin' Young Woman
- Decca 6018 My Little Honeysuckle Rose / I'm Saying Goodbye

1942

- Mellow 1619 Blue Skies Turned To Gray / I Don't Want No Part Of You
- Mellow 1620 I'll Be Happy Again / Goodbye And Luck To You
- Mellow 1621 Long Gone / Just Wanting You
- Mellow 1622 Hail, Hail Ol' Glory / Riding And Singing My Song
- Mellow 1623 Hillbilly Rose / If I Would Never Lose You
- Mellow 1624 Going Back To The Sunny South / Life Can Never Be The Same
- Mellow 1625 We're Gonna Catch That Train / It Makes Me Jealous Hearted
- Mellow 1105/1629 Hamtramck Mama / Home In Tennessee
- Mellow 1633 Memories Of You / New Trail To Mexico
- Mellow 1634 Rose Of The Rio Grande / York Brothers Blues
- Mellow 1635 Kentucky's Calling Me / Got To Get Rid Of My Worried Mind
- Mellow 1637 Maybe Then You'll Care / You Stayed Away Too Long
- Mellow 1638 Going To The Shindig / Mother's Sunny Smile
- Mellow 1640/1641 Merry Christmas To The Boys Over There / Not Over 35
- Mellow 1642 I Got My Eyes On You / You'll Pay For It All

1946

- Bullet 607 I'm Not Fooling / Mine In Dreams
- Bullet 610 Blues Why Don't You Leave Me Alone / Yesterday's Love

1947

- Bullet 618 Hamtramck Mama / My Tears Will Never Make You Change
- Bullet 619 Let's Talk It Over, Please Do / Hop, Skip And Jump
- Bullet 641 Mother's Not Dead She's Only Sleeping / Got Blues On My Mind
- Bullet 642 I'm A Soldier For Jesus / Blue Ridge Mountain Blues
- King 669 Let's Don't Sleep Again / They Laid My Darling Away
- King 683 New Mississippi River Blues / If I Knew I'd Never Lose You
- King 690 Let's Talk Our Troubles Over / Nothing But The Blues
- King 691 Mountain Rosa Lee / You're The One
- King 723 Sweet Anita / It Ain't No Good
- King 766 A Package Of Old Love Letters / New Mississippi River Blues

1949

- Fortune 120 Hamtramck Mama / Highland Park Girl

1950

- King 852 Take A Number / Gravy Train
- King 858 Motor City Boogie / I'm Coming Back Home To Stay
- King 901 Kill Her With Kindness / Road Of Sadness

1951

- King 970 Sixty Minute Man / Looking For Somebody New
- King 983 Chicken Blues / Tremblin'

1952

- King 1042 Love Sweet Love / When You Want A Little Lovin'
- King 1049 My Carolina Gal / That's Why I'm Crying All The Time
- King 1067 Hard Way / I Love You Waltz
- King 1092 Two Sides To Every Story / Twirly Whirly
- King 1135 Tennessee Tango / River Of Tears
- King 1156 So Full Of Love / Baby I'm Lost Without You

1953

- Fortune 180 Detroit Hula Girl / Going Home
- King 1170 Why Was I Born To Be Blue / Baby Come On Home
- King 1173 St. Joseph's High School Bounce / Lakewood And J. Marshall Blues
- King 1206 Rocky Bumpy Road To Love / Ever Since We Met
- King 1248 Why Don't You Open The Door / You're My Every Dream Come True
- King 1277 Starlight My Love / My Prayer Tonight
- King 1299 Kentucky / Tight Wad
- King 1324 I Get The Blues In Springtime / Mr. Midnight

1954

- King 1351 Deep Within My Heart / I'll Leave The Door Open
- King 1362 Strange Town / 3 O'Clock Blues
- King 1400 Hurts Me To My Heart / Two Loves In One Night
- King 1418 Don't Leave Me With Yum Yum Blues / Why Did You Have To Go

1955

- King 1434 Chip On Your Shoulder / That's All I Want From You
- King 1449 House With No Windows / If You Hadn't Told The First Lie
- King 1468 Mohawk Squaw / These Haunting Years
- King 1488 Don't Take It So Hard / Pretty Little Thing
- King 1503 Don't Get Your Dander Up / Whatsoever You Do

1957

- Decca 30473 Everybody's Tryin' To Be My Baby / I Want My Baby Back

1963

- York Bros.100 Monday Morning Blues / Unwanted Roses

Albums (compilations and re-issues)

- Rare Rockabilly, Vol. 3 LP MCA (UK) 1978
- Decca Rare Rockabilly, Vol. 3 LP MCA (US) 1986
- MCA Rockabillies, Vol. 2 CD Big Tone (UK) 1993
- That'll Flat Git It, Vol. 6 CD Bear Family (Ger) 1994
- Detroit In The 40s And 50s: The York Brothers' Best CD Collector (Neth)
- Long Time Gone CD Ace (UK) 2006
