= Orsan =

- Commune
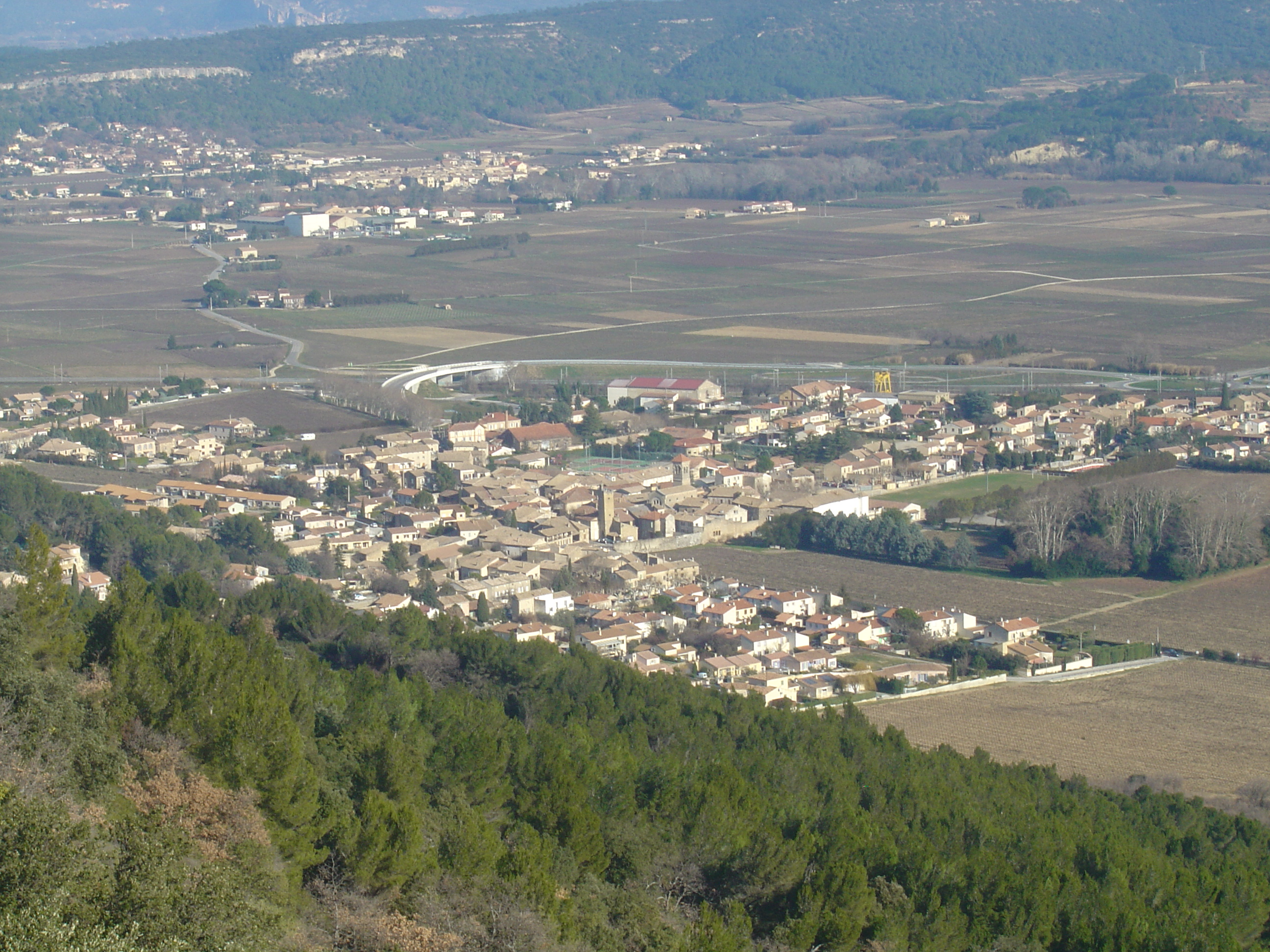
- A general view of Orsan

- Coat of arms
- Location of Orsan
- Location within France Location within Occitanie
- Coordinates: 44°07′56″N 4°40′01″E
- Country: France
- Region: Occitania
- Department: Gard
- Arrondissement: Nîmes
- Canton: Bagnols-sur-Cèze
- Intercommunality: CA Gard Rhodanien

Government
  - Mayor (2020–2026): Bernard Ducros
- Area^{1}: 6.9 km^{2} (2.7 sq mi)
- Elevation: 42 m (138 ft)
- Highest elevation: 230 m (750 ft)
- Lowest elevation: 29 m (95 ft)
- Population (2023): 1,190
  - Density: 170/km^{2} (450/sq mi)
- Time zone: UTC+01:00 (CET)
  - Summer (DST): UTC+02:00 (CEST)
- INSEE/Postal code: 30191 /30200
- ^{1} French Land Register data, which excludes lakes, ponds, glaciers > 1 km^{2} (0.386 sq mi or 247 acres) and river estuaries.

Orsan (French pronunciation: [ɔʁsɑ̃]) is a commune in the Gard department in southern France.

== Population ==
Historical population
| Year | Pop. | ±% p.a. |
|---|---|---|
| 1968 | 720 | — |
| 1975 | 847 | +2.35% |
| 1982 | 968 | +1.93% |
| 1990 | 961 | −0.09% |
| 1999 | 1,014 | +0.60% |
| 2007 | 1,120 | +1.25% |
| 2012 | 1,090 | −0.54% |
| 2017 | 1,145 | +0.99% |
| 2023 | 1,190 | +0.64% |
Source: INSEE

== See also ==
- Communes of the Gard department
