= Pine River =

Pine River may refer to:

== Places ==
=== United States ===
- Pine River, Michigan, an unincorporated community in Arenac County
- Pine River Township, Michigan in Gratiot County
- Pine River, Minnesota, a small city
- Pine River Township, Cass County, Minnesota
- Pine River, Wisconsin, a town
- Pine River, Lincoln County, Wisconsin, an unincorporated community
- Pine River, Waushara County, Wisconsin, a census-designated place

=== Canada ===
- Pine River, Manitoba, a small community

== Rivers ==
=== Australia ===
- Pine River (Queensland)
  - North Pine River
  - South Pine River

=== Canada ===
- Pine River (British Columbia)
  - Pine River Breaks Provincial Park
- Pine River (Ontario)
- Pine River, Quebec

=== Canada-United States ===
- Pine River (Minnesota–Ontario)

=== United States ===
- Pine River (Michigan), any of eight rivers in Michigan
- In Minnesota:
  - Pine River (Kettle River), a river in Pine County
  - Pine River (Mississippi River), a river in Crow Wing County
  - Pine River (Saint Louis River), a river in St. Louis County
- Pine River (New Hampshire)
- Los Pinos River (sometimes translated as "Pine River") in Colorado and New Mexico
- Pine River (Rhode Island)
- In Wisconsin:
  - Pine River (Florence County), a tributary of the Menominee River
  - Pine River (Lincoln County), a tributary of the Wisconsin River in northern Wisconsin
  - Pine River (Richland County), a tributary of the Wisconsin River in southwestern Wisconsin
  - Pine River (Waushara County), a tributary of the Wolf River (Fox River)

== Companies ==
- Pine River Capital Management

== See also ==
- Rivière des Pins (disambiguation) (Pine River)
- Rivière aux Pins (disambiguation) (River of Pines)
