= Saint-Pons-la-Calm =

- Commune
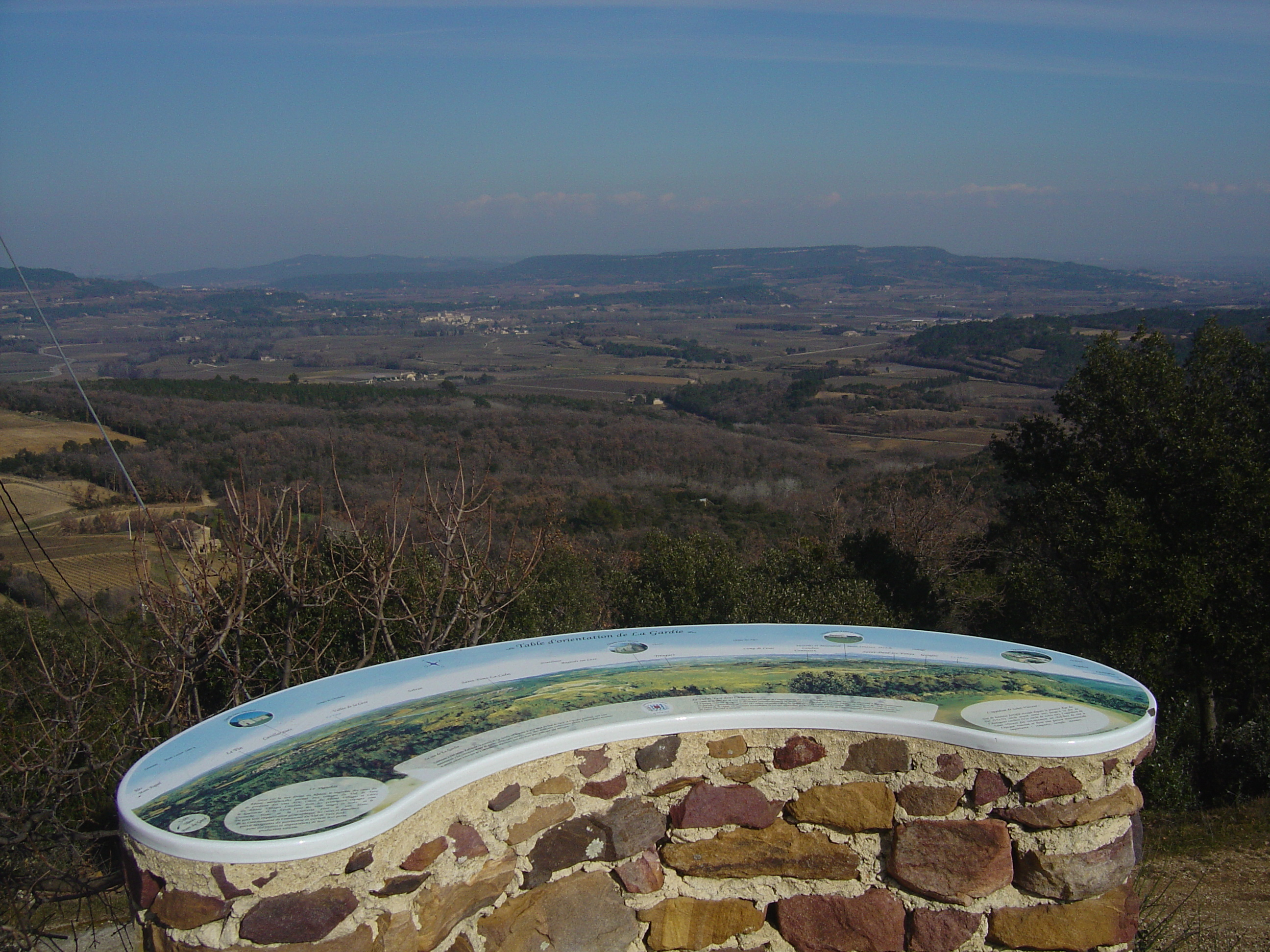
- The orientation table at the Gardie lookout

- Coat of arms
- Location of Saint-Pons-la-Calm
- Location within France Location within Occitanie
- Coordinates: 44°06′11″N 4°33′25″E
- Country: France
- Region: Occitania
- Department: Gard
- Arrondissement: Nîmes
- Canton: Bagnols-sur-Cèze
- Intercommunality: CA Gard Rhodanien

Government
  - Mayor (2020–2026): Jean Roche
- Area^{1}: 6.37 km^{2} (2.46 sq mi)
- Elevation: 100 m (330 ft)
- Highest elevation: 282 m (925 ft)
- Lowest elevation: 82 m (269 ft)
- Population (2023): 501
  - Density: 78.6/km^{2} (204/sq mi)
- Time zone: UTC+01:00 (CET)
  - Summer (DST): UTC+02:00 (CEST)
- INSEE/Postal code: 30292 /30330
- ^{1} French Land Register data, which excludes lakes, ponds, glaciers > 1 km^{2} (0.386 sq mi or 247 acres) and river estuaries.

Saint-Pons-la-Calm (French pronunciation: [sɛ̃ pɔ̃s la kalm]; Occitan: Sent Ponç de la Cam) is a commune in the Gard department in southern France.

== Geography ==
It is located near Bagnols-sur-Cèze, the third-largest city of Gard, a few minutes away from the Pont du Gard, from Uzès, Nîmes, Avignon, Alès, and the Cévennes. Saint-Pons benefits from being at the crossroads of the valleys of the Tave, the Cèze and the Rhône.

== Population ==
Historical population
Year	Pop.	±% p.a.
1968	330	—
1975	327	−0.13%
1982	375	+1.98%
1990	391	+0.52%
1999	410	+0.53%
2007	411	+0.03%
2012	428	+0.81%
2017	438	+0.46%
2023	501	+2.27%
Source: INSEE

== See also ==
- Communes of the Gard department
