= Chusclan =

Commune in Occitanie, France

- Commune
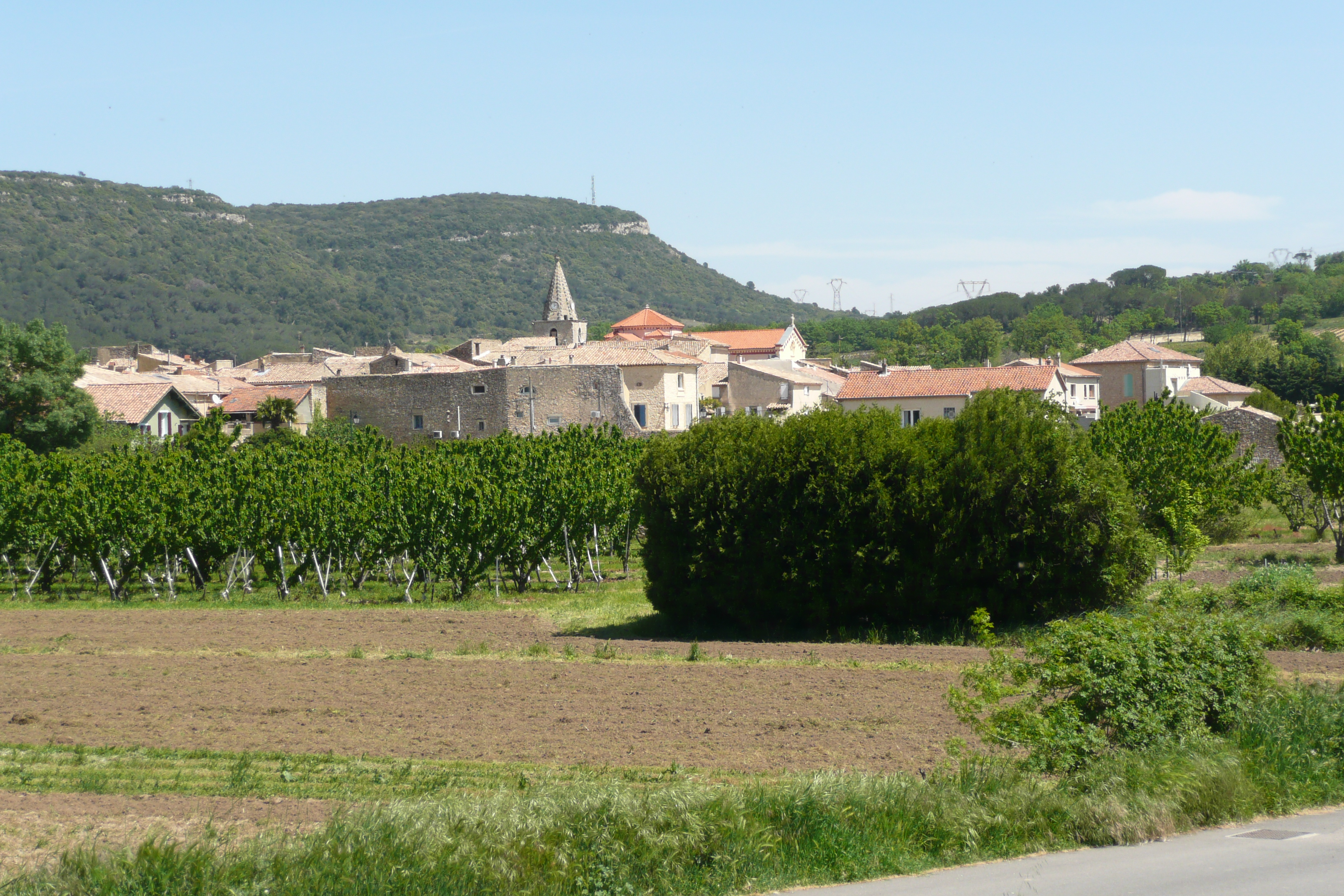
- A general view of Chusclan

- Coat of arms
- Location of Chusclan
- Location within France Location within Occitanie
- Coordinates: 44°09′00″N 4°41′02″E
- Country: France
- Region: Occitania
- Department: Gard
- Arrondissement: Nîmes
- Canton: Bagnols-sur-Cèze
- Intercommunality: CA Gard Rhodanien

Government
  - Mayor (2020–2026): Pascal Peyrière
- Area^{1}: 13.23 km^{2} (5.11 sq mi)
- Elevation: 38 m (125 ft)
- Highest elevation: 268 m (879 ft)
- Lowest elevation: 28 m (92 ft)
- Population (2023): 980
  - Density: 74/km^{2} (190/sq mi)
- Time zone: UTC+01:00 (CET)
  - Summer (DST): UTC+02:00 (CEST)
- INSEE/Postal code: 30081 /30200
- ^{1} French Land Register data, which excludes lakes, ponds, glaciers > 1 km^{2} (0.386 sq mi or 247 acres) and river estuaries.

Chusclan (French pronunciation: [ʃysklɑ̃]) is a commune in the Gard department in southern France.

== Geography ==
=== Climate ===
Chusclan has a hot-summer Mediterranean climate (Köppen climate classification Csa). The average annual temperature in Chusclan is 15.3 °C (59.5 °F). The average annual rainfall is 750.2 mm (29.54 in) with November as the wettest month. The temperatures are highest on average in July, at around 25.1 °C (77.2 °F), and lowest in January, at around 6.6 °C (43.9 °F). The highest temperature ever recorded in Chusclan was 43.1 °C (109.6 °F) on 12 August 2003; the coldest temperature ever recorded was −7.8 °C (18.0 °F) on 2 January 2002.

Climate data for Chusclan (1991−2020 normals, extremes 1991−2021)
| Month | Jan | Feb | Mar | Apr | May | Jun | Jul | Aug | Sep | Oct | Nov | Dec | Year |
|---|---|---|---|---|---|---|---|---|---|---|---|---|---|
| Record high °C (°F) | 20.9 (69.6) | 24.3 (75.7) | 27.3 (81.1) | 31.1 (88.0) | 35.5 (95.9) | 41.6 (106.9) | 40.2 (104.4) | 43.1 (109.6) | 36.0 (96.8) | 31.2 (88.2) | 23.4 (74.1) | 18.6 (65.5) | 43.1 (109.6) |
| Mean daily maximum °C (°F) | 10.1 (50.2) | 11.9 (53.4) | 16.4 (61.5) | 19.7 (67.5) | 24.0 (75.2) | 28.7 (83.7) | 31.7 (89.1) | 31.3 (88.3) | 25.9 (78.6) | 20.4 (68.7) | 14.1 (57.4) | 10.5 (50.9) | 20.4 (68.7) |
| Daily mean °C (°F) | 6.6 (43.9) | 7.6 (45.7) | 11.2 (52.2) | 14.1 (57.4) | 18.2 (64.8) | 22.4 (72.3) | 25.1 (77.2) | 24.7 (76.5) | 20.2 (68.4) | 15.8 (60.4) | 10.5 (50.9) | 7.2 (45.0) | 15.3 (59.5) |
| Mean daily minimum °C (°F) | 3.1 (37.6) | 3.3 (37.9) | 6.0 (42.8) | 8.5 (47.3) | 12.3 (54.1) | 16.0 (60.8) | 18.4 (65.1) | 18.1 (64.6) | 14.5 (58.1) | 11.3 (52.3) | 6.9 (44.4) | 3.8 (38.8) | 10.2 (50.4) |
| Record low °C (°F) | −7.8 (18.0) | −7.2 (19.0) | −7.7 (18.1) | 0.0 (32.0) | 3.9 (39.0) | 8.4 (47.1) | 9.9 (49.8) | 10.6 (51.1) | 6.2 (43.2) | 1.0 (33.8) | −5.4 (22.3) | −6.7 (19.9) | −7.8 (18.0) |
| Average precipitation mm (inches) | 63.3 (2.49) | 37.8 (1.49) | 45.2 (1.78) | 64.1 (2.52) | 57.7 (2.27) | 38.0 (1.50) | 32.8 (1.29) | 48.2 (1.90) | 102.4 (4.03) | 100.5 (3.96) | 107.2 (4.22) | 53.0 (2.09) | 750.2 (29.54) |
| Average precipitation days (≥ 1.0 mm) | 5.8 | 4.7 | 4.6 | 6.8 | 6.7 | 4.3 | 3.4 | 4.0 | 5.4 | 7.0 | 7.9 | 5.9 | 66.5 |
Source: Météo-France

== Population ==
Historical population
| Year | Pop. | ±% p.a. |
|---|---|---|
| 1968 | 616 | — |
| 1975 | 668 | +1.16% |
| 1982 | 809 | +2.77% |
| 1990 | 941 | +1.91% |
| 1999 | 908 | −0.40% |
| 2007 | 967 | +0.79% |
| 2012 | 978 | +0.23% |
| 2017 | 967 | −0.23% |
| 2023 | 980 | +0.22% |
Source: INSEE

== See also ==
- Côtes du Rhône Villages AOC
- Communes of the Gard department
