= Yu Bin (painter) =

Chinese painter and writer

Yu Bin (喻彬)
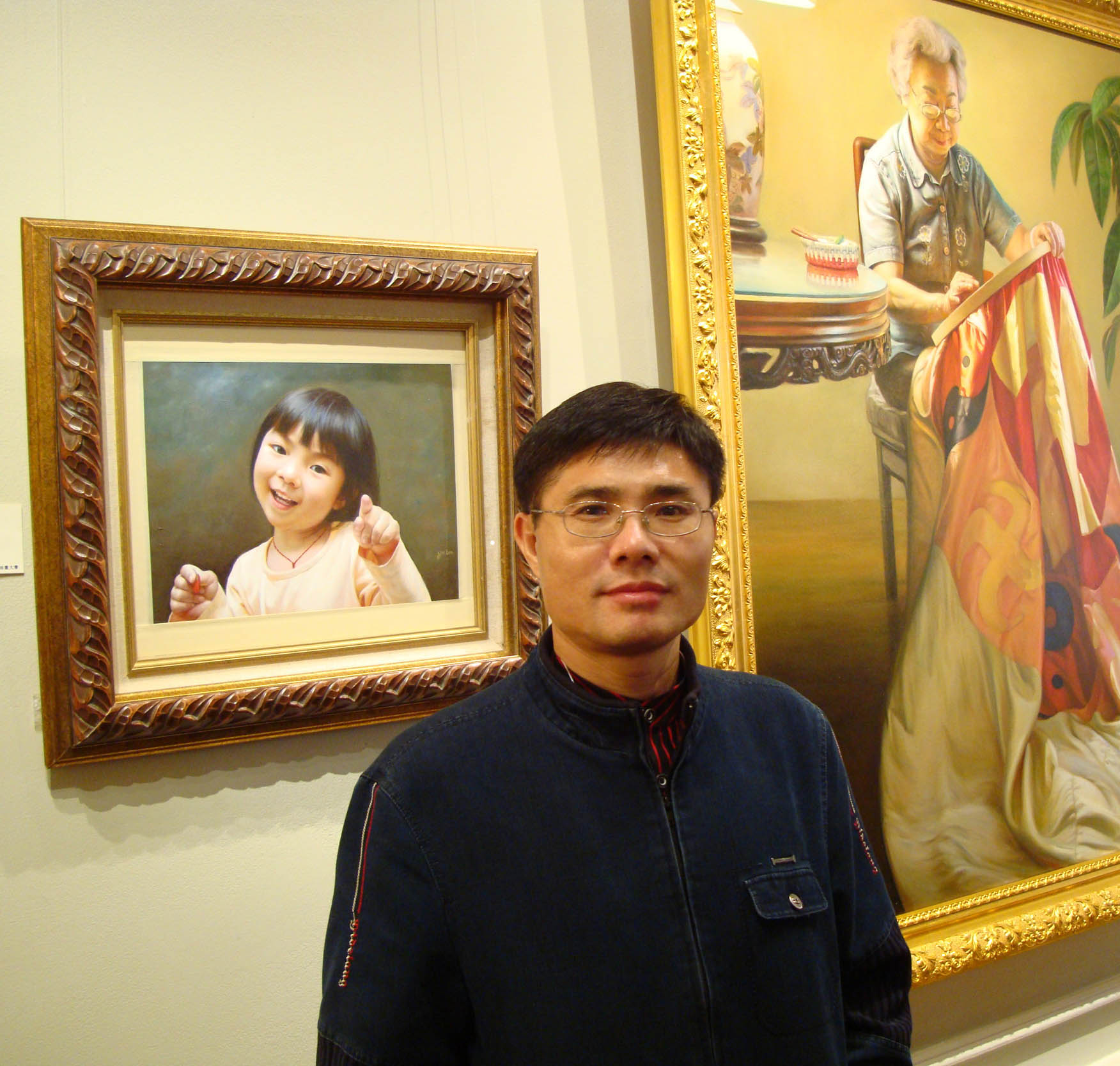
- 2008, Yu Bin at the International Chinese Realistic Characters Oil Painting Competition Awards in New York
- Born: November 6, 1966 (age 59); Jishui，Jiangxi, PRC
- Education: Northwest University, China
- Notable work: Oil Paintings：Girl with A Petal, The Threshold—the Dream; Screenplays：Iron Heroine, Narrow Escape, Escape, The Sixth Patriarch Hui-Neng， The Chief Prosecutor, Assassination; Novellas：Women in War, Ms. Bodyguard of Sun Yat-sen; Documentary: The Secret of Life, The Last Station, The Story of a Bridge and an Old Village, The Spirit of Yongfu Bridge, etc.; Films：Seven Fright Nights, Imprisoned Girl, etc.
- Awards: Girl with A Petal, Bronze Award, 1st International Chinese Realistic Characters Oil Painting Competition, 2008; The Threshold—the Dream, Honorable Mention ,2nd International Chinese Realistic Characters Oil Painting Competition, 2009; Iron Heroine, Screenplay Award, 2nd Beijing Film Artists Association Cup, 2011; Narrow Escape, Screenplay Award, 3rd Beijing Film Artists Association Cup, 2012; Escape, Screenplay Award, 3rd Chongqing Film Artists Association Cup, 2012; The Secret of Life, the prize for the best short documentary in the Canada Golden Maple Film Festival, 2016

Yu Bin (Chinese: 喻彬; Yù Bīn, pseudonyms: 如冰 Rú Bīng, 愚公 Yú Gōng) (born 6 November 1966 in Jishui, Jiangxi province) Is a Chinese painter and writer. He now works as a Professor in Guangzhou University, teaching Drama and Film Literature, Drama and Film Appreciation and Criticism, and Screenplay Writing.

== Biography ==
Born in Jishui, Jiangxi province, Yu Bin graduated from the Chinese Language and Literature Department of Northwest University, China. Now he lives in Guangzhou and works in the press and publication as a journalist. He began his writing and painting career in 1986. In 2013, Yu Bin was invited to serve as a Signed Writer by the Guangdong Writers' Association. He is now the director of Guangdong Sinology Research Association, the review expert of overseas film and television dramas of Guangdong press, publication, radio, film and television bureau, a member of Chinese Writers Association, Guangdong Dramatists Association, Chinese Film Literature Association, Aesthetic education expert database of Guangdong Provincial Department of Education, and Chinese Biographical Literature Association. He is also a signed writer with the Guangdong Writers Association (China).

== Works ==
Yu Bin's works published in art and literature journals like China Art Weekly, Art Observation, Pathlight (People's Literature), Chinese Writer, Huacheng and Fiction World. Major works are Women in War, Miserable World—Tears of Blood, Footprints of Years, Ms. Bodyguard of Sun Yat-sen, Dance with the Devil, The Legend of the Sixth Patriarch of Zen Sect, Looking for Father, etc.

In November 2011, he published the Legend of the Sixth Patriarch of Zen Sect (coauthored). In December 2011, he published two novels, Women in War and Miserable World—Tears of Blood. In 2013, Yu Bin was invited as the Signed Writer of the writers' association of Guangdong Province. In 2016, he published Ms. Bodyguard of Sun Yat-sen (novel). In 2017, he published New Media Writing and Ironclad Proof(a collection of his screenplays).

As a film director, his main works include Ms. Bodyguard of Sun Yat-sen, Karma of Green Plum, The Legend of Liu Heizai, and A Bold Team Named Dongzhong, etc.

- Novel: Dance with the Devil, Ms. Bodyguard of Sun Yat-sen, Prediction
- Full-length Biographical Literature: The Legend of the Sixth Patriarch of Zen Sect (coauthored)
- Novelette Anthology: Women in War
- Documentary Literature Anthology: Miserable World—Tears of Blood
- Reportage Literature Anthology: The Force
- Painting and Poetry Anthology: Footprints of Years
- Teaching Material: New Media Writing
- Painting Collection: Portrait of Dreams
- Fiction Collection: Fallen Yellow Flowers
- Reportage Collection: Weeping for the People
- Film: Seven Fright Nights
- Film Script: The Earth and Jiamu
- Documentary: The Secret of Life

== Awards ==
Oil painting Girl with A petal won the bronze award in 1st International Chinese Realistic Character Oil Painting Competition, another oil painting The Threshold—the Dream won the honorable mention in 2nd International Chinese Realistic Character Oil Painting Competition.

Novella Women in War was award for nomination in 5th (2007–2009) The Lu Xun Prize in Literature, China.

Screenplays Iron Heroine and Narrow Escape are respectively won the Screenplay Award in the 2nd and 3rd Beijing Film Artists Association Cup. Screenplay Escape won the Screenplay Award in 3rd Chongqing Film Artists Association Cup, 2012.

- 2008, bronze award in 1st International Chinese Realistic Character Oil Painting Competition.
- 2009, honorable mention in 2nd International Chinese Realistic Character Oil Painting Competition.
- 2011, Screenplay Award in 2nd Beijing Film Artists Association Cup.
- 2012, Screenplay Award in 3rd Beijing Film Artists Association Cup.
- 2012, Screenplay Award in 3rd Chongqing Film Artists Association Cup.
- 2016, the prize for the best short documentary in the Canada Golden Maple Film Festival.
- 2020, Chine Golden Rooster Award for National Theme: Creative Script Award.
