= Pinning =

Pinning may refer to:

- Pinning, the effect of certain weapons that cause their targets to be pinned down
- Pinning ceremony (nursing), a symbolic welcoming of new graduates into the nursing profession
- Pinning force, a force acting on a pinned object from a pinning center
- Pinning (modelling), the use of pins to strengthen the joints when assembling large or heavy model kits
- Pinning points, points in a crystalline material that act to halt a dislocation's movement
- Pinning hold, a hold used to control an opponent in grappling
- Flux pinning, a phenomenon that magnetic flux lines do not move despite the Lorentz force acting on them inside a current-carrying Type II superconductor
- Percutaneous pinning, a technique used by orthopedic surgeons for the stabilisation of unstable fractures
- Tree pinning, inserting spikes into trees in order to cause damage to sawmill equipment
- Zener pinning, the influence of a dispersion of fine particles on the movement of low- and high angle grain boundaries through a polycrystalline material
- HTTP Public Key Pinning, a security mechanism for HTTPS websites

== See also ==
- Pin (disambiguation)
- Panning (disambiguation)
- Pegging (disambiguation)
