= Hairpin technology =

Winding technology for electric motors

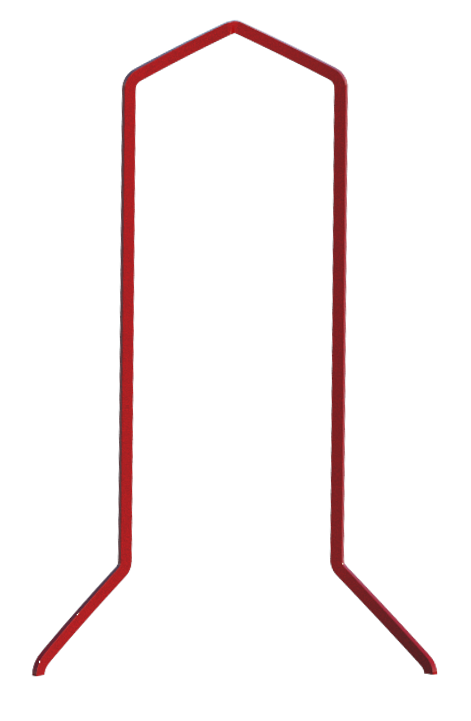
Copper wire in typical hairpin geometry

Hairpin technology is a winding technology for stators in electric motors and generators and is also used for traction applications in electric vehicles. In contrast to conventional winding technologies, the hairpin technology is based on solid, flat copper bars which are inserted into the stator stack. These copper bars, also known as hairpins, consist of enameled copper wire bent into a U-shape, similar to the geometry of hairpins.

In addition to hairpins with U-shape, there are two other variants of bar windings, the so-called I-pin technology and the concept of continuous hairpin windings.

I-Pins are straight copper wire elements that are inserted into the stator slots. Unlike Hairpins, these Pins are not bent prior to insertion into stack. However, contacting is necessary on both sides of the stator. In the concept of continuous hairpin windings, so-called winding mats are produced and afterwards inserted into the stack from the inner diameter.

Hairpin stators are most commonly used for synchronous machines.

== Stator structure ==
The structure of a hairpin stator differs from conventional stators only in the type of winding system - other components of the stator are little changed. The stack of sheets consists of many layers of individual sheets, each insulated by a thin coating. The housing is another subcomponent that does not generally require modifications. The thin, round wire of the conventional winding technology is substituted by copper bars, which better fit the slot geometry and therefore provide a higher slot-filling degree than regular winding. To create the necessary winding scheme, the free ends of the hairpins are twisted before welding. In addition to the impregnation process for the entire stator, which is also necessary for conventionally wound stators, a layer of insulation resin is applied to the ends of the hairpins.

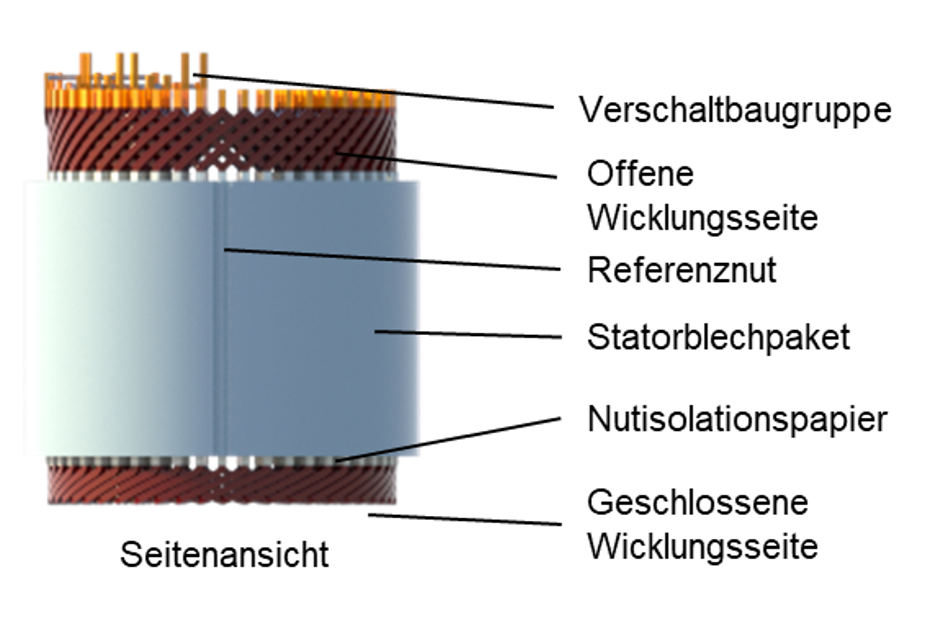
Structure of a hairpin stator

== Manufacturing ==
The hairpin stator process chain is based on an indirect winding approach. Due to the solid cross section, hairpins can be shaped into their final geometry ahead of the actual assembly process. In contrast to conventional stator production, in which winding-based assembly processes predominate, a forming process is applied.

Production can be divided into 4 steps:

=== Hairpin ===
In the first process, a flat copper wire, which is usually already enameled, is continuously unwound and straightened in several stages to reduce residual curvature and stresses. In preparation for welding of the copper ends in a later process step, this insulation is partially removed. Laser-based and mechanical processes are feasible. The hairpin wire is cut to length and bent, in varying order. Hairpins are formed into a three-dimensional geometry either in a single-stage process using special CNC bending equipment or in multiple stages in which a die bending process follows a swivel bending process. There are three technologies for bending hairpin wires: U-Pin, in which hairpin wires have a shape resembling a U, I-Pin, with wires resemling an I, and Continuous Hairpin, also called continuous wave, in which a single wire is bent into a serpentine shape up to several meters long. U-Pin technology is the most common of these.

=== Assembly and twisting ===
Next the pins are inserted into the stator stack. The insertion process is limited by overlaps in the winding head geometry. The hairpins are usually pre-assembled in an assembly nest. Individual pins are arranged in accordance with the winding scheme. In general, a single hairpin stator uses 3-16 different hairpin geometries. The stator slots are lined with insulation paper to separate the winding system from the ground potential of the stator's sheet stack.

In the next assembly step, the hairpin basket is inserted axially into the stator stack. To support the insertion the hairpins are sometimes equipped with chamfers during the cutting process – grippers can improve positioning precision.

Each layer of hairpin ends is twisted in accordance with the winding scheme. During the associated rotation the tool has to be moved in an axial direction for height compensation. To ensure axial accessibility the hairpin ends must be radially exposed in a preparatory step.

=== Welding and interconnection ===
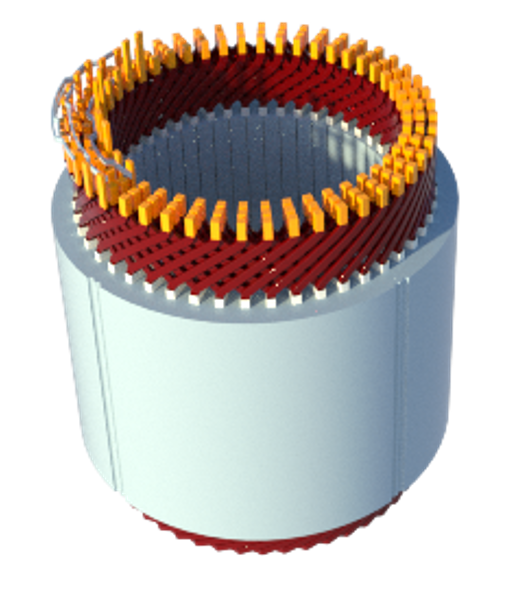
Rendering of a hairpin stator

Next, hairpin ends are electrically contacted with each other to form the winding scheme. Using a laser, the hairpin ends are partially melted and joined. An optimal welding process is marked by homogenous weld geometries as well as minimal thermal input. Repeatable welding strategies require the stator to maintain a stable condition.

Relative height and lateral offset of the hairpin end can cause welding defects. These can be prevented by corrective processes that are dependent on precise tolerances within upstream processes. Phase jumps and the main electroconductive connection of the entire winding can be carried out through connective elements or assemblies connect to the welded hairpin ends. This can also be done via laser welding. Examples of interconnection elements are contact rings, terminals, and bridges.

=== Insulation ===
After the winding process, the welded copper ends are re-insulated and the entire stator is impregnated. Powder coating or polyurethane-based resins are commonly used to insulate the copper ends. Typically, dipping, trickling, or potting processes are used. The impregnation process differs little from those used for conventional stators, such as dipping or trickling processes. The purpose of impregnation is to protect the stator from thermal, electrical, ambient, and mechanical influences.

=== Testing ===
A variety of tests are performed throughout the production process. Ensuring function- and safety-relevant properties of the stator is a key objective. Common tests are:

- Partial discharge testing
- Surge voltage testing
- Resistance testing
- Geometric testing

== Challenges ==
Particularly in traction drives, a major implementation challenge is process reliability, particularly bending and welding processes. The bending process must not damage the insulation and exactly match the required geometry. Incorrectly welded hairpin ends can cause electrical losses – and possibly a non-functioning stator.

Key target parameters are high fill factors within the stator slots and a small winding head. Due to the rectangular and enlarged conductor cross section, fill factors can reach 73% (significantly higher than the 45-50% in conventionally wound stators). A small winding head increases relative active material and thus the proportion that generates power. However, hairpin's larger cross section can result in additional electrical losses, e.g., due to current displacement effects such as the skin effect.

== Automotive industry ==
Due to deterministic assembly processes, good speed-torque behavior, and high fill factors, hairpin technology has gained appeal for automotive applications. Additionally, the hairpin production process is suitable for automation. As a result, shorter cycle times and increasing quantities lead to decreasing production costs.

Hairpin technology is increasingly applied in automotive applications. The first production vehicle with hairpin technology was the 2008 General Motors Chevrolet Tahoe hybrid featuring 2 motors with this stator construction in GM's 2ML70 "2Mode" transmission.

The Volkswagen Group relies on hairpin stators in its electric vehicles, including the ID.3, ID.4 the Audi e-tron GT, and the Porsche Taycan. The BMW iX3 is the company's first vehicle to employ hairpin stators. In 2021, General Motors unveiled its new motor line up that includes a 64 kW ASM for hybrid applications and a 255 kW PSM in the Hummer EV. In 2023, Tesla announced that its next generation motor would use hairpins.

== Research ==
Government and industry are funding hairpin technology research projects. These include:

- Pro-E-Traktion (Production, BMW AG)
- HaPiPro2 (Production, PEM of RWTH Aachen University)
- AnStaHa (Production, Karlsruhe Institute of Technology)
- IPANEMA (Machine Learning, API Hard- and Software GmbH)
- KIPrEMo (Artificial Intelligence, FAPS of FAU Erlangen-Nürnberg)
- KIKoSA (Artificial Intelligence, FAPS of FAU Erlangen-Nürnberg)
