= Push pin (disambiguation) =

A push pin is a short nail or pin with a long, cylindrical head made of plastic.

Push pin may also refer to:

- Push-pin (game), an English child's game
- Push Pin Studios, a graphic design studio
