= Lu Pin =

Lu Pin may refer to:

- Lü Pin (activist) (born 1972), Chinese journalist and feminist activist
- Lu Pin (artist) (born 1972), Chinese sculptor
- Lü Pin (footballer) (born 1995), Chinese footballer
