= Pinhead =

Pinhead may refer to:

- the head of a pin
- Pinhead, a term once used to describe a person with microcephaly
- Pinhead (Hellraiser), a fictional character
- Pinhead (Neighbours), the fictional character Craig Pinders
- Pinhead (Puppet Master), a puppet character
- Pinheads, a group of characters in the stage play The Elephant Man
- Pinhead, a puppet on the American TV show Foodini the Great
- "Pinhead", a song by The Ramones from the 1977 album Leave Home
- Pinhead, an early development stage of a mushroom
- Pinhead Records, an Argentine recording label

== See also ==
- Zip the Pinhead, an American freak show performer
- Zippy the Pinhead, a fictional character
- Pinhead pearlfish, a species of fish
- Freaks, a 1932 film with characters called pinheads, who had microcephaly
