= KPRA =

KPRA may refer to:

- Kingpin to rear axle, a measurement of the length of a semi-tractor trailer
- KPRA (FM) (89.5 FM), a radio station in Ukiah, California
