= Pin, Haute-Saône =

Pin
- Commune
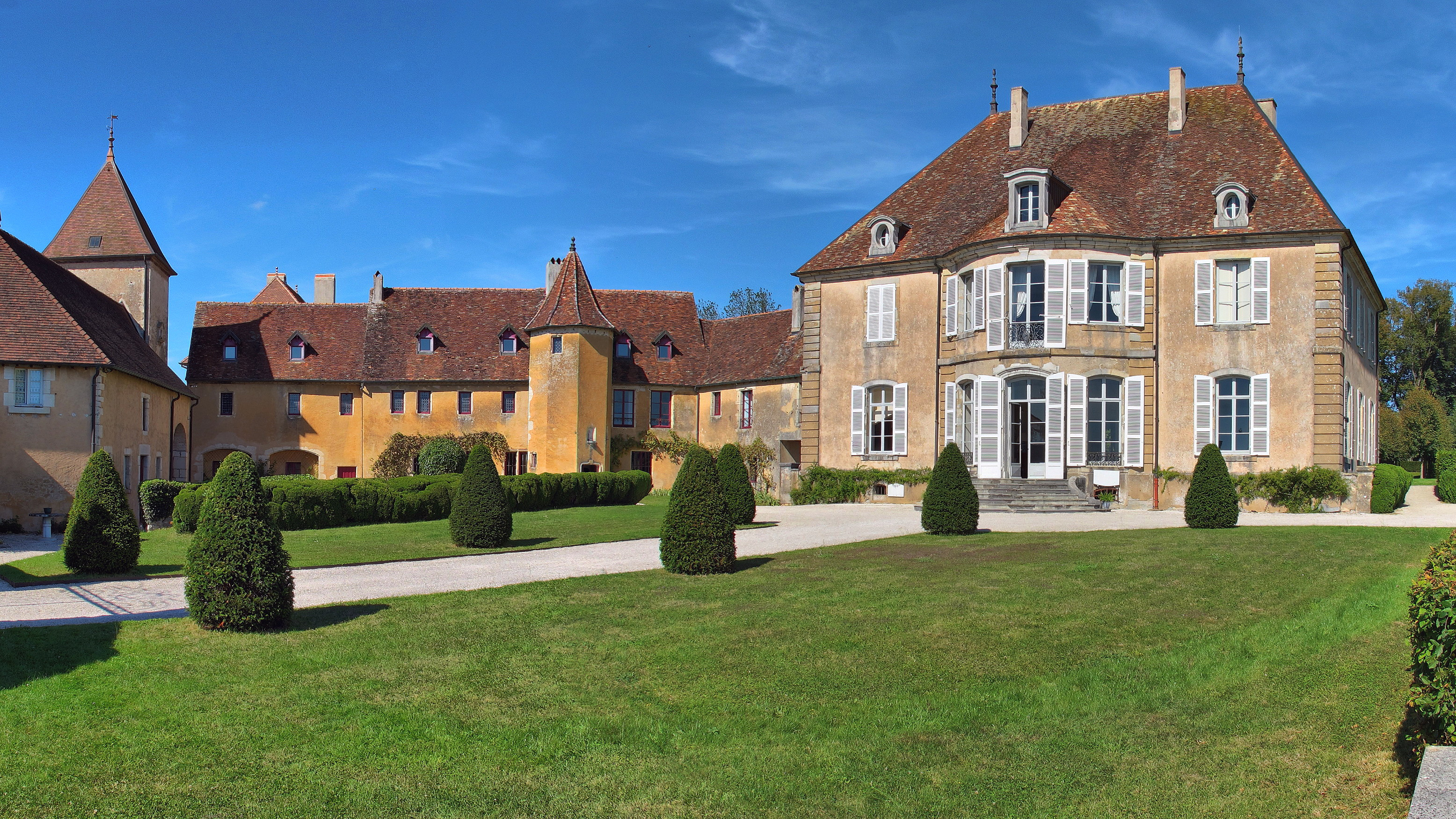
- The chateau in Pin
- Location of Pin
- Location within France Location within Bourgogne-Franche-Comté
- Coordinates: 47°19′25″N 5°51′55″E
- Country: France
- Region: Bourgogne-Franche-Comté
- Department: Haute-Saône
- Arrondissement: Vesoul
- Canton: Marnay

Government
  - Mayor (2020–2026): Patrick Combeau
- Area^{1}: 14.04 km^{2} (5.42 sq mi)
- Highest elevation: 368 m (1,207 ft)
- Lowest elevation: 203 m (666 ft)
- Population (2023): 732
  - Density: 52.1/km^{2} (135/sq mi)
- Time zone: UTC+01:00 (CET)
  - Summer (DST): UTC+02:00 (CEST)
- INSEE/Postal code: 70410 /70150
- ^{1} French Land Register data, which excludes lakes, ponds, glaciers > 1 km^{2} (0.386 sq mi or 247 acres) and river estuaries.

Pin (French pronunciation: [pɛ̃]) is a commune in the Haute-Saône department in the region of Bourgogne-Franche-Comté in eastern France.

== See also ==
- Communes of the Haute-Saône department
