= Pin-up (disambiguation) =

A pin-up model is a model whose mass-produced pictures and photographs have wide appeal.

Pin-up or variants may also refer to:

- Pin Ups, a 1973 album by David Bowie
- Pinups (Human Drama album), 1993
- Pinups (magazine), a triannual artist's publication
- Pin-Up (magazine), a biannual architecture and design magazine
- Pinups, a band related to Adolescents, and one of their albums
- Lisa Pin-Up (Lisa Chilcott, fl. from 1990s), a British electronic dance music producer and DJ

== See also ==
- Model (person)
