= Horst Piepenburg =

German jurist (born 1954)

- Born: 9 March 1954 (age 72); Rees, Germany
- Education: University of Münster
- Occupation: Lawyer
- Employer: Piepenburg & Gerling

Horst Piepenburg (born 9 March 1954) is a German jurist specialising in bankruptcy law. He is the co-founder of Piepenburg & Gerling, one of the leading bankruptcy law firms in Germany, and has worked more than 1,000 insolvency cases, including Babcock Borsig and PIN Group.

In June 2009, Piepenburg was appointed bankruptcy manager of Arcandor, the "biggest insolvency currently underway in Germany." He resigned from this post in July, citing the "lack of support by Arcandor's large shareholder," private bank Sal. Oppenheim, as the reason for his decision.

Following the 2012 reform of the Insolvency Code, Piepenburg was appointed court-appointed administrator of Pfleiderer. He also held this position in the insolvency of IVG Immobilien. On 12 May 2017, the Bonn Local Court appointed him as provisional insolvency administrator for Solarworld AG.

In 2023, he took on the role of administrator for Peek & Cloppenburg.
