= Kelly Brothers =

1960s Chicago gospel quartet

The Kelly Brothers were a 1960s Chicago gospel quartet, which also sang R&B as the King Pins. The group comprised brothers Curtis, Robert and Andrew Kelly with the fourth part sung by Charles Lee or Offe Reece. The group gave King Records their only Chicago success in the soul idiom as the King Pins with "It Won't Be This Way (Always)," in 1963, which reached number twelve on Billboard's R&B chart.

In 1966, the Kelly Brothers reached #39 on the Billboard R&B singles chart with "Falling in Love Again."
