= Pin (film) =

1988 film by Sandor Stern

- Theatrical release poster
- Directed by: Sandor Stern
- Written by: Sandor Stern
- Based on: Pin by Andrew Neiderman
- Produced by: Pierre David; Rene Malo
- Starring: David Hewlett; Cynthia Preston; Terry O'Quinn
- Cinematography: Guy Dufaux
- Edited by: Patrick Dodd
- Music by: Peter Manning Robinson
- Production companies: Image Organization; Lance Entertainment; Malofilm; Telefilm Canada
- Distributed by: New World Pictures
- Release date: May 16, 1988
- Running time: 102 minutes
- Country: Canada
- Language: English

Pin (stylized as PIN...), fully titled Pin: A Plastic Nightmare, is a 1988 Canadian horror film written and directed by Sandor Stern and starring David Hewlett, Cynthia Preston and Terry O'Quinn. It is based on the 1981 novel by Andrew Neiderman. The film was released direct-to-video in the United States on January 27, 1989.

== Plot ==
Dr. Frank Linden has a life-size, anatomically correct medical dummy in his office which he calls "Pin". Via ventriloquism, Dr. Linden uses Pin to teach his children, Leon and Ursula about bodily functions and how the body works in a way the children can relate to without it being awkward. Dr. Linden's interactions with the children are otherwise cold and emotionally distant, and his ventriloquism act is the only sign of a more warm and playful side to his nature.

Unknown to Dr. Linden, Leon is mentally ill and has come to believe that Pin is alive. Due in part to his mother, who discourages Leon from playing outdoors or bringing anyone home, Leon has no real friends and sees Pin as the closest analogue. Leon is further traumatized when he secretly witnesses his father's nurse use Pin as a masturbatory sex doll. From that day on, he hates women with large breasts or who engage in promiscuous behaviour. Leon and Ursula discuss the sex education they have had, and Ursula admits she is looking forward to being older, as she thinks she will enjoy 'the urge'.

The film segues to the point where they are in their teens. While at a high school dance, Leon discovers graffiti suggesting Ursula sleeps around. He finds her in a car with a boy, whom he assaults, and makes her promise never to do this again. Later she admits to him that she is pregnant, and Leon—via Pin—insists that they tell their father, who performs an abortion on fifteen-year-old Ursula.

When Leon turns eighteen, Dr. Linden, having come back to retrieve case studies for a speech, catches him having a conversation with Pin (via ventriloquism, which Leon had learned). Realizing the extent of Leon's psychosis and that his son is mentally ill, Dr. Linden takes Pin away to use as a visual aid for a speech with the intention of leaving Pin at the medical school. As Dr. and Mrs. Linden speed to the hall, they get into a car crash caused by either Dr. Linden's recklessness or, arguably, Pin. The Lindens are killed instantly. Later, as Ursula sits in the back of a police car, crying, Leon secretly retrieves Pin from the scene.

Leon and Ursula, though grieving and orphaned, enjoy their newfound freedom until Mrs. Linden's sister, Aunt Dorothy, moves in. She supports Ursula in taking a job at the library, which Leon is against. Believing that she is influencing Ursula and after talking it over with Pin, Leon causes Aunt Dorothy to die from a heart attack by using Pin to frighten her. Ursula continues to work at the library, where she researches schizophrenia and concludes Leon is a paranoid schizophrenic. She also meets handsome athlete Stan Fraker and falls in love. Meanwhile, Leon takes his fixation with Pin to pathological extremes, first by dressing him in Dr. Linden's clothes and finally fitting him with latex skin and a wig.

Leon believes that Stan is only interested in Ursula's inheritance and that he wants to put Leon in a sanitarium. He invites Stan to the house under the guise of discussing a surprise birthday party for Ursula. Leon drugs Stan's drink, and when Stan fights back, Leon bludgeons Stan with a sculpture. Following Pin's supposed instructions, he puts Stan in a bag and plans to dump him in the river. Leon is interrupted by a call from Ursula, who says she intends to come home early. Leon quickly hides Stan's body in a woodpile outside the house and cleans up the blood.

To calm her, Leon tells Ursula that Stan is visiting a sick friend out of town. She believes him until she hears a beep and finds the watch she gave Stan (which beeps every hour) and a damp spot on the carpet. When she confronts Leon, he blames it on Pin, which causes her to run out of the house in hysterics. Leon asks Pin why he would not help him. Pin states that he has never lied to or for him, and that it would be useless to lie anyway because neither has any idea how. Leon, desperate and out of schemes, blames his motives on Ursula. Pin points out that he is lying again, and that everything was done to satisfy his own selfish motives. Ursula returns with an axe, which she raises ready to strike. The screen then goes white as Leon screams and cowers.

The police find Stan's body. To their astonishment, he is still alive. Some time later, Ursula and Stan return to the house to visit Pin. Ursula tells Pin that she's going on a trip with Stan. Pin inquires as to whether she's heard from Leon, to which Ursula replies with a "No." Pin says that he misses him a great deal, and Ursula tearfully agrees with the sentiment. As the story ends, it is revealed that Ursula is talking to Leon, who has taken Pin's persona. After Ursula destroyed her brother's only companion with an axe, Leon had a psychotic break, which left only the dummy's side of his personality to completely take over. Leon has essentially become Pin, in the flesh.

== Cast ==
- David Hewlett as Leon Linden
- Cynthia Preston as Ursula Linden
- Terry O'Quinn as Dr. Frank Linden
- Bronwen Mantel as Mrs. Linden
- John Pyper-Ferguson as Stan Fraker
- Jonathan Banks as Pin (voice)

== Production ==
Pin is an adaptation of the 1981 novel of the same name written by Andrew Neiderman. The novel eventually found its way to Sandor Stern, a director who had started off as a medical doctor, who loved Neiderman's rich characters as well as the unconventional focus of an anatomical medical dummy. Stern collaborated with Neiderman on adapting the book over the course of five years before getting it set up at New World Pictures.

The film was shot in Montreal, Quebec, Canada, in 1987. Produced by Rene Malo and Pierre David. Directed by Sandor Stern. Stars include David Hewlett, Cyndy Preston, Terry O'Quinn, Bronwen Nantel and John Ferguson.

== Release ==
Pin became the victim of bad timing as by the time production had finished, New World Pictures was in the process of dissolving its film division and while Pin had been intended to be a final theatrical release, the company decided against it at the last minute. A screening of the film was met with a negative response, and rather than invest any time or resources into Pin New World instead released it direct to video. The film eventually started getting more attention in 1991 when prints in Manhattan and San Francisco were given successful runs with many critics declaring the film to have been overlooked.

Pin was released on VHS on May 31, 1989. and DVD on April 24, 2001, in Widescreen Anamorphic. The DVD has commentary by director Sandor Stern and journalist Ted Newsom.

The film was given a wide release in Canada on January 27, 1989. The film would also receive a theatrical re-release in the United States December 4, 1991.

== Reception ==
Janet Maslin of The New York Times called it "a cool, bloodless, well-made thriller with a taste for the quietly bizarre." Andrew Marshall of Starburst rated it 9/10 stars and wrote, "A low-key psychological horror produced at a time when the genre was swamped with interminable sagas of invincible otherworldly serial killers, Pin is subtle, disturbing, and brilliant." Charles Tatum from eFilmCritic.com awarded the film a very positive 5 out of 5 stars, praising the film's creepy music score, and direction, as well as Hewlett and Preston's performances.

== Legacy ==
Pin was featured in Fangoria magazine's 101 Best Horror Movies You've Never Seen. It has since become a cult film, and a remake, to be directed by Stern, was announced in 2011.
