= Le Pin, Gard =

Le Pin
- Commune
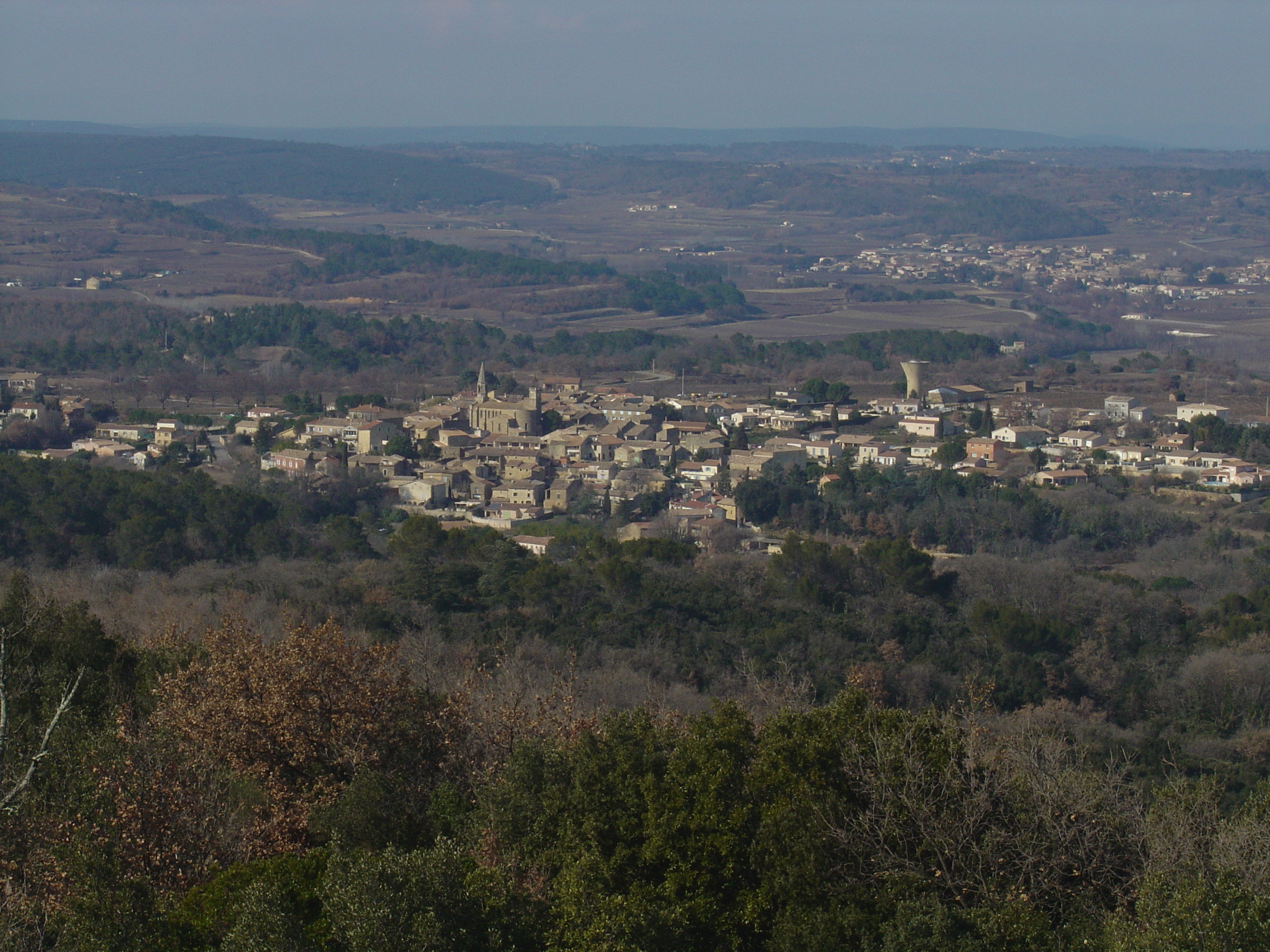
- A general view of Le Pin

- Coat of arms
- Location of Le Pin
- Location within France Location within Occitanie
- Coordinates: 44°05′28″N 4°32′30″E
- Country: France
- Region: Occitania
- Department: Gard
- Arrondissement: Nîmes
- Canton: Bagnols-sur-Cèze
- Intercommunality: CA Gard Rhodanien

Government
  - Mayor (2020–2026): Patrick Palisse
- Area^{1}: 5.96 km^{2} (2.30 sq mi)
- Elevation: 176 m (577 ft)
- Highest elevation: 261 m (856 ft)
- Lowest elevation: 94 m (308 ft)
- Population (2023): 474
  - Density: 79.5/km^{2} (206/sq mi)
- Time zone: UTC+01:00 (CET)
  - Summer (DST): UTC+02:00 (CEST)
- INSEE/Postal code: 30196 /30330
- ^{1} French Land Register data, which excludes lakes, ponds, glaciers > 1 km^{2} (0.386 sq mi or 247 acres) and river estuaries.

Le Pin (French pronunciation: [lə pɛ̃]; Occitan: Lo Pin) is a commune in the Gard department in southern France.

== Population ==
Historical population
Year	Pop.	±% p.a.
1968	150	—
1975	140	−0.98%
1982	173	+3.07%
1990	256	+5.02%
1999	290	+1.40%
2007	334	+1.78%
2012	365	+1.79%
2017	426	+3.14%
2023	474	+1.80%
Source: INSEE

== See also ==
- Communes of the Gard department
