= Connaux =

- Commune
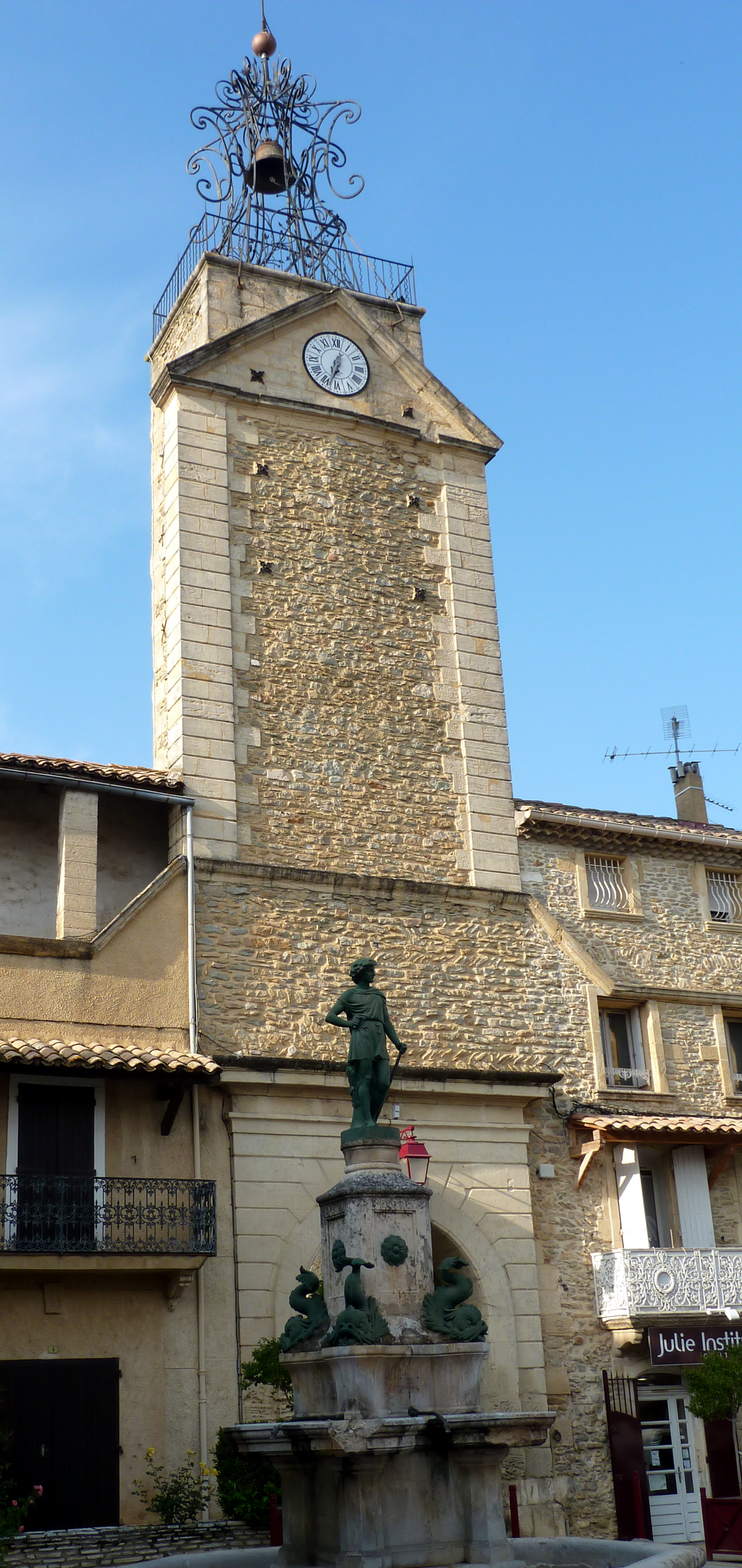
- The clock tower in Connaux

- Coat of arms
- Location of Connaux
- Location within France Location within Occitanie
- Coordinates: 44°05′31″N 4°35′41″E
- Country: France
- Region: Occitania
- Department: Gard
- Arrondissement: Nîmes
- Canton: Bagnols-sur-Cèze
- Intercommunality: CA Gard Rhodanien

Government
  - Mayor (2020–2026): Stéphane Maurin
- Area^{1}: 9.58 km^{2} (3.70 sq mi)
- Elevation: 77 m (253 ft)
- Highest elevation: 231 m (758 ft)
- Lowest elevation: 56 m (184 ft)
- Population (2023): 1,705
  - Density: 178/km^{2} (461/sq mi)
- Time zone: UTC+01:00 (CET)
  - Summer (DST): UTC+02:00 (CEST)
- INSEE/Postal code: 30092 /30330
- ^{1} French Land Register data, which excludes lakes, ponds, glaciers > 1 km^{2} (0.386 sq mi or 247 acres) and river estuaries.

Connaux (French pronunciation: [kɔno]; Occitan: Conauç) is a commune in the Gard department in southern France.

== Population ==
Historical population
Year	Pop.	±% p.a.
1968	744	—
1975	979	+4.00%
1982	1,212	+3.10%
1990	1,450	+2.27%
1999	1,623	+1.26%
2007	1,624	+0.01%
2012	1,587	−0.46%
2017	1,674	+1.07%
2023	1,705	+0.31%
Source: INSEE

== See also ==
- Communes of the Gard department
