= Pin (novel) =

1981 gothic horror novel by Andrew Neiderman

- First edition
- Author: Andrew Neiderman
- Language: English
- Genre: gothic horror thriller
- Publisher: Pocket Books
- Publication date: 1981
- Publication place: United States
- ISBN: 9780671415013 (mass market paperback edition)
- OCLC: 7341617

Pin is a 1981 American gothic horror novel by Andrew Neiderman.

== Premise ==
The book describes the dysfunctional childhood and later adulthood, of two siblings haunted by "Pin", their father's medical anatomy doll which resides in his office and "speaks" via ventriloquism on the father's part. The book was adapted into a Canadian film by the same title in 1988.

== Plot ==
Leon and Ursula are siblings, growing up in a wealthy mansion with their parents. Their father is a stern, analytical and curious medical doctor, who often means well but can be eccentric, creepy and even at times frightening, which influences the children as they grow up. Their mother, neurotic, abusive and obsessed with cleaning and hygiene, is constantly scrubbing floors and keeping the house spotless. As a result, Leon and Ursula have very few friends and spend most of their childhood isolated, coming to rely on each other for companionship.

One day, Ursula's best friend, a sexually experienced schoolgirl, gives Ursula a copy of a pornographic magazine, which Ursula sneaks into one of the bedrooms at home. Leon discovers her with it, and the two children giggle at the magazine and explore it, only to be caught by their mother. Despite the children not having actually done anything sexual, the mere existence of the offending magazine causes their father to take an interest in the children's proper sexual education. To explain sex and gender to the children, he uses ventriloquism to get his medical anatomy mannequin, named "Pin" (short for "Pinocchio") to "speak" to Leon and Ursula about "The Need" (a euphemism for sexual desire). Their father often uses Pin to entertain his other child patients during medical appointments so that they won't be frightened of doctors, a benign parlour trick, but while Ursula learns to recognize this as a trick, Leon does not. He fully believes that Pin is alive and speaking to him.

As the children grow up, Ursula becomes sexually promiscuous while Leon is neurotic about trying to protect her. Ursula is popular, and tries to get Leon, who is physically attractive but also weird and unpleasant, to date fellow girls whom she is friends with. Leon has little to no interest in dating, dances or other romantic pursuits. Ursula becomes pregnant in high school, and confides in Leon about it first. Leon believes that she should admit the pregnancy to their parents, which she does, only for her to then be brought into her father's medical office for a traumatic abortion. Not understanding the blatant inappropriateness of it, the father asks Leon if he wants to observe the abortion for educational reasons. Leon declines, but later comforts Ursula when she returns home.

Ursula is bothered by Leon's insistence that Pin would have helped her to deal with the underage pregnancy; she has long since stopped believing that Pin is alive, and she finds the whole thing silly. As Leon and Ursula reach adulthood, Leon misses Pin's "lectures"; their father has stopped using ventriloquism since he thinks his children are too old to find it amusing anymore. Leon begins to fill in as the ventriloquist for Pin, having lengthy conversations with the mannequin that are all in his own head.

An accident kills the parents, leaving Leon and Ursula to inherit the mansion and the assets within it. This is exciting for the two adult siblings, who relish in finally having independence, but they can't quite figure out what to do with their newfound freedom, remaining as isolated as ever. To make matters worse, much to Ursula's disgust, Leon "rescues" Pin and brings him home to live with them, dressing the mannequin up in a wig and a suit, causing it to eerily resemble their late father. Ursula keeps the house incessantly clean, a force of habit instilled in her by her mother, but she longs for a social life and wants Leon to get rid of Pin.

Leon becomes a shut-in and spends most of his time in the house looking after Pin. His world becomes increasingly unhinged; at various points throughout the book, he confuses some people for others, sees things that aren't real, and his relationship with Pin becomes much more intense and even violent. To Ursula's horror, Leon also begins expressing latent incestuous feelings for her that she does not reciprocate. An ambiguous ending implies that she has destroyed Pin, which has psychologically fractured Leon's already unstable mind, leaving himself unclear as to whether or not he himself is Pin. Ursula still loves her brother but is tragically aware that he is mentally ill and probably always will be.

== Themes ==
Pin is one of Neiderman's earlier standalone horror novels, and features themes and ideas that would later become popular in his other written works. This includes gothic romanticism, Freudian psychology, isolated properties, family dysfunction, child abuse, childhood trauma, sexual fetishism, incest and the struggle to fit in with societal social norms. Much of these themes, as well as the die-cut cover design of Pin's original 1980s paperback edition, would later become incorporated into Neiderman's ghostwritten works for the V.C. Andrews estate.

== Reception ==
Pin received mostly positive reviews from critics upon its release and into future decades. The book was written of in Grady Hendrix's Paperbacks From Hell as a nostalgic but unabashedly creepy and unnerving story. Howl Society largely praised the book as well, rating it 4/5 stars and saying of it, "Pin is written in crisp, clean prose that handles difficult topics with the lurid glee of a madman. It’s at once in the tradition of Poe, deeply entrenched in what makes classic horror tick, while also being a shining example of more taboo-breaking modern horror." Howl Society did, however, also criticize the taboo sexual themes of the book, stating, "I have no issue with murder and general violence, supernatural forces, or other types “horrific content” in fiction. I don't even consider this depravity. But [Pin] goes beyond the types of horror elements I consider to be typical of the genre and ventures into truly repulsive territory that I do not consider at all “the point” of the genre, especially when read through the lens of 40 years that have passed since this book's publication and especially recent movements regarding consent and sexual assault. I just found this book a lot more vile than any other horror book I’ve read." Critic Dave Fuentes praised Pin for its psychological elements, saying of the book, "despite featuring many of the fantastical elements of your typical ‘80s horror paperback, there are interesting psychological twists as well. Consequently, Pin is more sophisticated than many in its genre."

Pin was an Edgar Award Nominee for Best Paperback Original in 1982, although it did not win. In addition, the book was adapted into a 1988 Canadian film starring David Hewlett as Leon, Cynthia Preston as Ursula, and Terry O'Quinn as Dr. Frank Linden.

== See also ==
- Magic, a psychological horror novel by William Goldman featuring a ventriloquist's dummy
- Slappy the Dummy, a fictional evil ventriloquist's dummy in children's horror literature
