= Operation Kingpin =

Operation Kingpin may refer to:

- Operation Kingpin (World War II) – a secret mission to secure the cooperation of French General Henri Giraud to the Allied invasion of North Africa
- The final phase of Operation Ivory Coast, a failed rescue mission in North Vietnam during the Vietnam War
