= PIN Group =

PIN Group AG
- Company type: Public
- Industry: Postal Service, Courier
- Founded: 1999 / 2005
- Headquarters: Leudelange, Luxembourg
- Key people: Horst Piepenburg, CEO
- Products: Service company
- Revenue: €168.3 million (2006) €275.0 million (2007)
- Number of employees: 9000 (Dec 2007)
- Website: www.pin-ag.de

The PIN Group was a German courier and postal services company. It belonged to PIN Group S.A., a Luxembourg-based corporate affiliation made up of several German postal companies.

== History and shareholding ==
The PIN Group originally traded under the name Briefdienstleistungsunternehmen PIN intelligente Dienstleistungen AG, a postal services company founded in 1999 in Berlin. In 2004, Axel Springer AG and the Holtzbrinck Publishing Group each bought a majority shareholding of 30% from the company founders and venture capital company DKB Wagniskapital GmbH. In October 2005 the remaining shares of the PIN founders were acquired by WAZ-Mediengruppe and the Luxembourg investment company Rosalia Investment S.A. before founding the PIN Group. In the summer of 2006 the newspaper publishers Madsack, M. DuMont Schauberg, Rheinisch-Bergische Verlagsgesellschaft and W. Girardet merged their postal services divisions into the company, receiving in return a 10% holding of PIN Group AG. Following the takeover of Briefnetz Süd GmbH & Co. KG (BNS), a consortium of postal services providers owned by 12 newspaper publishers in Bavaria and Baden-Württemberg, since April 2007 the PIN Group has operated a mail delivery network throughout the whole of Germany. To offer delivery services to German authorities and government departments, the PIN Group acquired Ulm-based postal services provider DirektExpress.

Since June 2007, the majority shareholder in the PIN Group has been the Axel Springer publishing company, after raising its holding from 23.5% to 71.6%. Axel Springer bought these shares from WAZ, Holtzbrinck and Rosalia for €510 million.

The holding company, PIN Group S.A. is responsible for laying down the strategy of the entire corporate affiliation and planning day-to-day operations, which are managed and organised by the German subsidiaries and shareholding companies.

In February 2007 around 7000 people worked for the PIN Group. The chairman of the executive board, Günter Thiel announced that the company planned to expand to more than 20,000 employees by the end of 2007

In the autumn of 2007 PIN Group successfully acquired business from a variety of Germany cooperative savings banks.

In November 2007, the German coalition government set the minimum wage for postal workers at €8 to €9.80 per hour. Due to the cost squeeze on owner Axel Springer, the company was quoted by the German Financial Times as examining "a variety of options" ranging from selling the company to closing down operations entirely. On 5 Dec 2007, PIN Group subsequently announced it was to lay off 1000 employees, more than 1/10 of the workforce, simultaneously criticising the German government for "consciously taking into account that investments worth billions to Germany ... would go to waste". In his 2007 Christmas address to the nation, German President Horst Köhler described the introduction of the minimum wage in the postal sector as "risky", stating that "a minimum wage that can not be paid by competitive employers destroys jobs".

The PIN Group CEO, Günter Thiel, resigned his position on 17 Dec 2007 after Axel Springer Publishing turned down his offer to buy its remaining 63.7% share in the company. His plan had been to continue to manage the company under his own finances.

On 29 December 2007 the delivery company saarriva, which is based in the German State of Saarland and is partly owned by PIN Group filed for bankruptcy.

On 23 January 2008 it was announced by Horst Piepenburg, the newly appointed chairman, that PIN would agree to pay its workers the newly defined minimum wage which had been set at €9.80 per hour.

Reports at the end of January 2008 stated that chairman Horst Piepenburg had entered discussions with American holdings, including the Blackstone Group, KKR and Advent International, although the company subsequently denied the claim.

It is now bankrupt.

== "Green post" ==
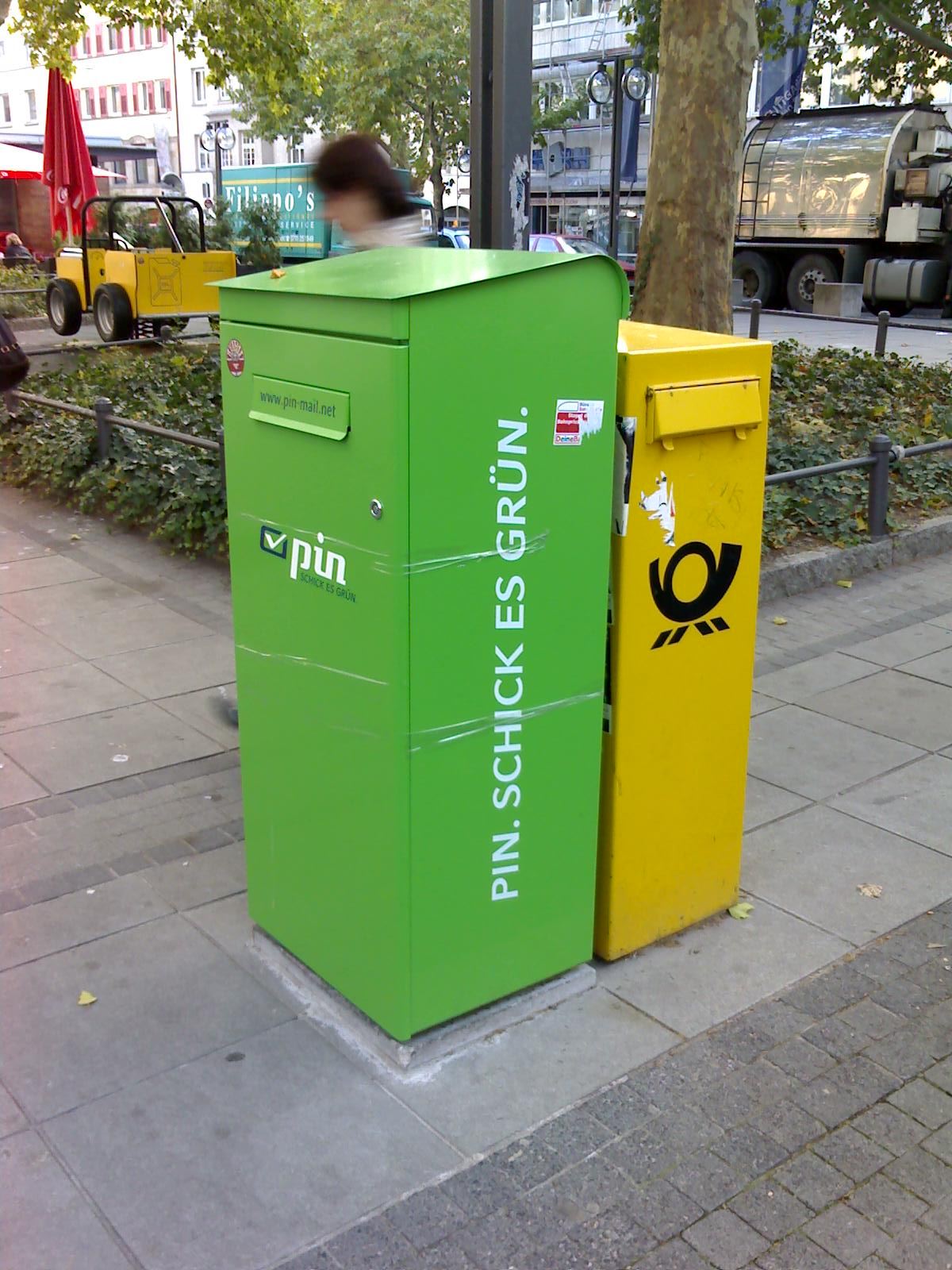
PIN Group post box (green) deliberately placed next to a Deutsche Post box

The PIN Group uses the colour green to differentiate itself from Deutsche Post, the postal services company formerly run as a monopoly by the German state, whose post boxes and delivery vans are in a distinctive yellow. Postal workers announce their arrival with the words [translated] "PIN, green post". Deutsche Post AG took legal steps to prevent this but lost the case in 2005 when the Hamburg state court ruled that this did not cause confusion with regard to the term "post".

The PIN Group sees itself as the leading alternative provider of postal services in Germany, preparing itself for the abolition of Deutsche Post's exclusive right to deliver letters under 50 grams, which ran out on 1 January 2008.

== Critics ==
A number of trade unions and employee representatives have protested at the treatment and employment terms of PIN staff claiming that the company can only undercut Deutsche Post postal charges by hiring cheap workers on salaries just above the minimum wage. The PIN Group has argued that, unlike arch-rival Deutsche Post, it is obliged to pay value-added tax.

In February 2007, leading German trade union Ver.di announced plans to negotiate a tariff agreement under regular arbitration with the company.

In November 2007, with the impending advent of privatisation raising awareness of the issue, a number of areas of the media - led by newspapers belonging to leading shareholder Axel Springer - condemned moves by politicians and the unions to introduce a minimum wage for postal workers.

== Shareholdings ==
The PIN Group corporate affiliation encompasses the following subsidiaries:

- PIN Mail Hannover GmbH, Hanover (formerly CITIPOST Gesellschaft für Kurier- und Postdienstleistungen mbH) Citipost
- DBU Die Briefunion GmbH, Brakel
- PIN Mail Münsterland GmbH, Münster (formerly Brief Direkt GmbH)
- PIN Mail GmbH, Alach by Erfurt(formerly THPS Thüringer Post Service GmbH)
- PIN Mail GmbH, Brakel (formerly ANNEN-POST GmbH)
- PIN Mail GmbH, Düsseldorf (formerly NET-DBS Netzwerk Deutscher Briefservice GmbH)
- PIN Mail GmbH, Essen (formerly WPS Westdeutscher Post Service GmbH)
- PIN Mail GmbH, Hamburg (formerly Punkt Direktvertriebs GmbH)
- PPD, Bremen (Privater Postdienst),
- PIN Mail GmbH, Kassel (formerly ANNEN-POST Kassel GmbH)
- PIN Mail GmbH, Neumünster (formerly Porto sparen im Norden GmbH)
- PIN Mail GmbH, Wildau (formerly Brief - Express Röder GmbH)
- PIN Mail GmbH, Woltersdorf (formerly Speedy-Express GmbH)
- BriefNetz Süd postal network
- DIREKTexpress Holding AG Ulm

The PIN Group also owns

- PIN MAIL AG, Berlin, which has now been renamed Pin Mail AG, Berlin.
