= Rivière des Pins =

Rivière des Pins ('River of the Pines') may refer to:

- Rivière des Pins (Blanc Lake), in MRC Mékinac Regional County Municipality and Portneuf Regional County Municipality, in Quebec, Canada
- Rivière des Pins (Nicolet River tributary), in MRC Arthabaska, Centre-du-Québec, in Quebec, Canada

== See also ==
- Rivière aux Pins (disambiguation)
- Pine River (disambiguation)
