= Rivière aux Pins =

Rivière aux Pins may refer to:

- Rivière aux Pins (Montmorency River tributary), in Sainte-Brigitte-de-Laval, La Jacques Cartier Regional County Municipality, Capitale-Nationale, Quebec, Canada
- Rivière aux Pins (Saint-Joseph Lake), in Fossambault-sur-le-Lac, La Jacques Cartier Regional County Municipality, Capitale-Nationale, Quebec Canada
  - Petite rivière aux Pins, tributary of Rivière aux Pins in La Jacques-Cartier Regional County Municipality, Capitale-Nationale, Quebec, Canada
- Rivière aux Pins (Beaurivage River tributary), in Lotbinière Regional County Municipality, Chaudière-Appalaches, Quebec, Canada
- Rivière aux Pins (Boucherville), a tributary of the south shore of the Saint Lawrence River in Boucherville, Montérégie, Quebec, Canada

== See also ==
- Rivière au Pin (Bécancour River tributary)
- Rivière des Pins (disambiguation)
- Pine River (disambiguation)
