= Roquemaure, Gard =

Roquemaure
- Commune
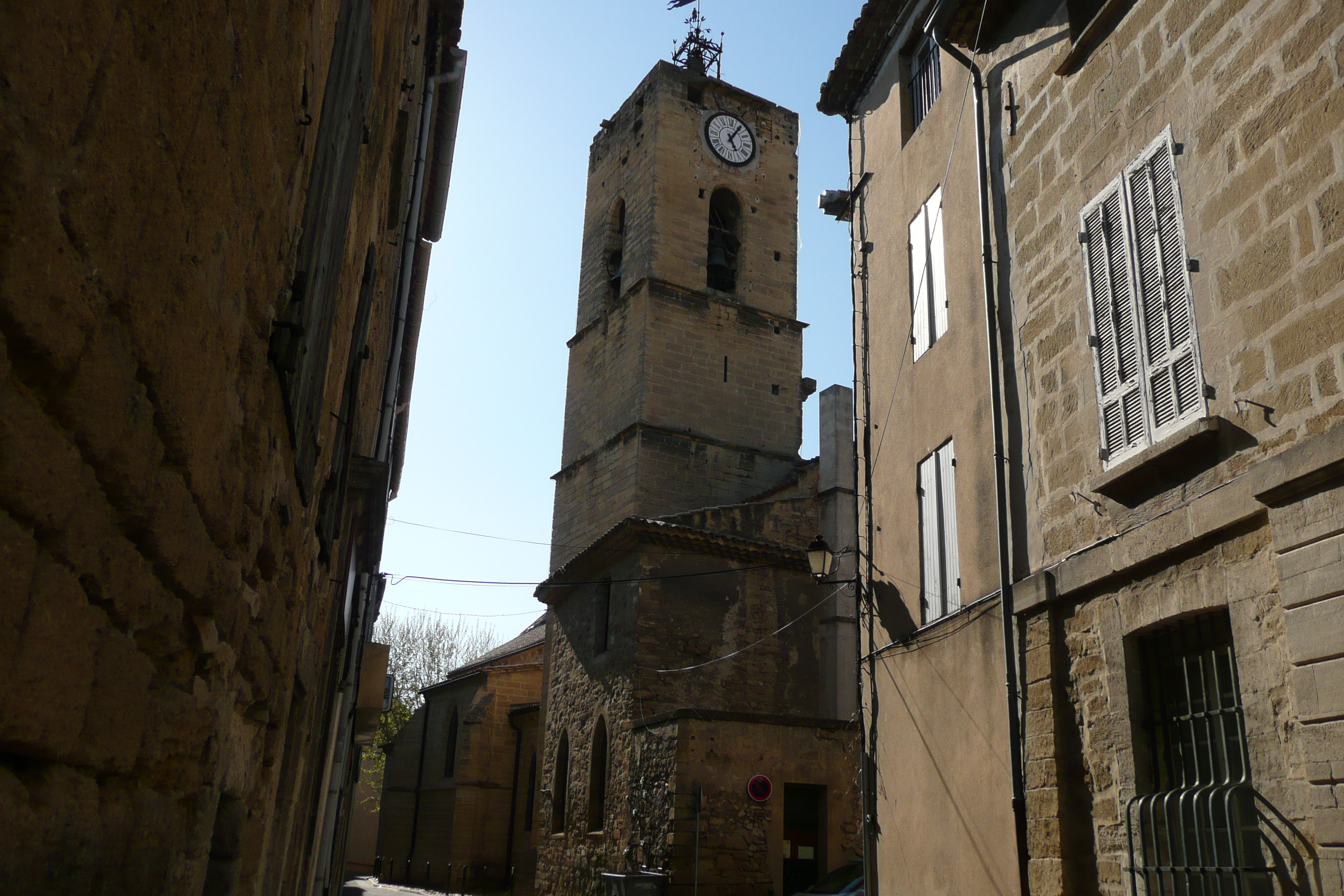
- The church of Roquemaure

- Coat of arms
- Location of Roquemaure
- Location within France Location within Occitanie
- Coordinates: 44°03′09″N 4°46′45″E
- Country: France
- Region: Occitania
- Department: Gard
- Arrondissement: Nîmes
- Canton: Roquemaure
- Intercommunality: CA Grand Avignon

Government
  - Mayor (2020–2026): Nathalie Nury
- Area^{1}: 26.22 km^{2} (10.12 sq mi)
- Elevation: 25 m (82 ft)
- Highest elevation: 176 m (577 ft)
- Lowest elevation: 20 m (66 ft)
- Population (2023): 5,529
  - Density: 210.9/km^{2} (546.1/sq mi)
- Time zone: UTC+01:00 (CET)
  - Summer (DST): UTC+02:00 (CEST)
- INSEE/Postal code: 30221 /30150
- ^{1} French Land Register data, which excludes lakes, ponds, glaciers > 1 km^{2} (0.386 sq mi or 247 acres) and river estuaries.

Roquemaure (French pronunciation: [ʁɔkmɔʁ]; Occitan: Ròcamaura; Provençal: Recamaulo) (Note: The lexicographer and poet Frédéric Mistral listed several possible spellings of the Provençal name of the town in his Lou Trésor dou Félibrige ou Dictionnaire provençal-français: Roco-mauro, Recamaulo, Racamaulo and Rocho-mauro. In his poem Lou Pouèmo Dóu Rose he used Roco-mauro. However, the spelling which more closely follows the pronunciation that was used in the town is Recamaulo.) is a small town and commune in the Gard department of southern France. The town lies 12 kilometres (7.5 miles) north of Avignon on the right bank of the Rhône. As of 2023, the population of the commune was 5,529.

Roquemaure was the site of a royal castle during the medieval period but after the French Revolution the castle was dismantled and now only two towers remain. In the 18th century Roquemaure was the centre of attempts to regulate the production of wine in the area and the term "Côte du Rhône" was coined. The town is infamous as the site where phylloxera, a pest of grapevines, was introduced into France from North America via England in the 1860s. Viticulture is still an important activity in the commune. Several types of wine are produced including some classified as Côtes du Rhône Appellation d'origine contrôlée.

== Geography ==
Roquemaure lies on the right (west) bank of the Rhône, at the eastern end of a narrow limestone ridge, the Montagne de Saint Geniès, that rises abruptly from the flat alluvial plain and extends for 4.5 kilometres (2.8 miles) in an east–west direction. The town is 12 kilometres (7.5 miles) north of Avignon, 10 kilometres (6.2 miles) south-southeast of Orange and 4 kilometres (2.5 miles) west of Châteauneuf-du-Pape which lies on the other side of the Rhône.

The town is the administrative centre (chef-lieu) of the canton of Roquemaure, one of 23 cantons of the Gard department. The canton consists of eleven communes: Codolet, Laudun-l'Ardoise, Lirac, Montfaucon, Roquemaure, Saint-Geniès-de-Comolas, Saint-Laurent-des-Arbres, Saint-Paul-les-Fonts, Saint-Victor-la-Coste, Sauveterre and Tavel.

== Toponym ==
The name Roquemaure is believed to be derived from the Occitan ròca (rock) + maura (feminine adjective black). Early Latin manuscripts use a variety of spellings for the name of the town. In 1539 the Ordinance of Villers-Cotterêts specified that French was to be used in official documents. The current French spelling is used in a manuscript dating from 1550.

== History ==
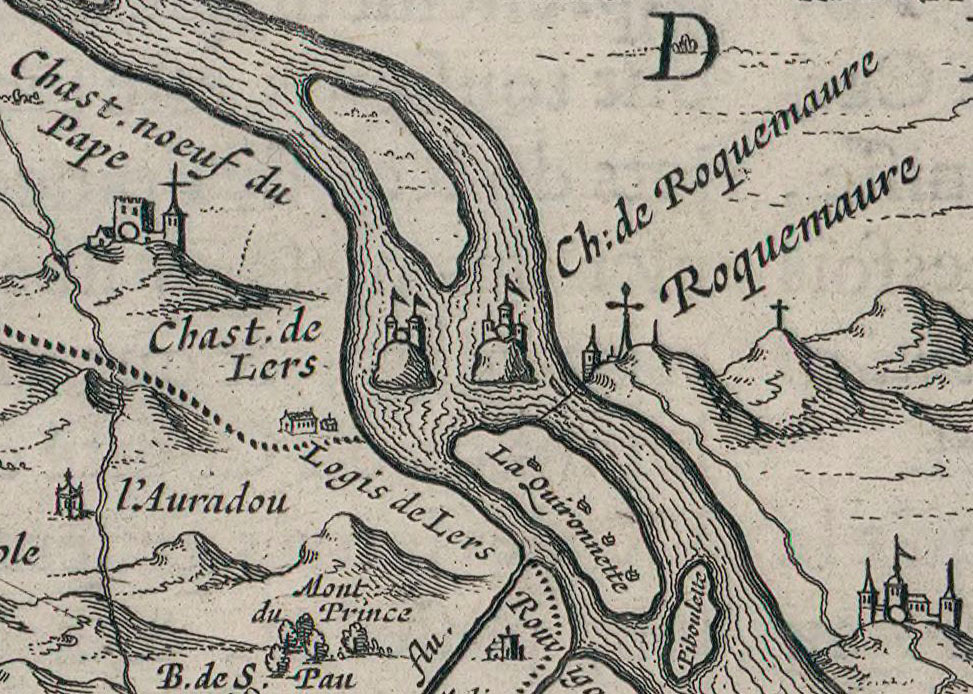
Detail from a map published in 1627 showing the castle of Roquemaure on a rock within the Rhône

=== Hannibal ===
In 218 BC, at the start of the Second Punic War, Hannibal crossed the Rhône with his army and war elephants in his journey from the Iberian peninsula to northern Italy. The classical historians Polybius and Livy each provide accounts of the journey, but the exact route has been the source of much scholarly debate. Roquemaure is one of several locations that have been proposed for the crossing.

=== Gallo-Roman villa ===
Archaeological excavations undertaken in 1996 ahead of the construction of a new high speed railway line (TGV) uncovered the remains of a Gallo-Roman villa and 35 burials at a site 2 kilometres (1.2 miles) northwest of the town, just to the south of the Roc de Peillet, a small limestone outcrop on the old alluvial terrace of the Rhône called Les Ramières. The earliest finds date from the Augustan period (63 BC-14 AD). The site was abandoned during the 7th century.

=== Roquemaure castle ===
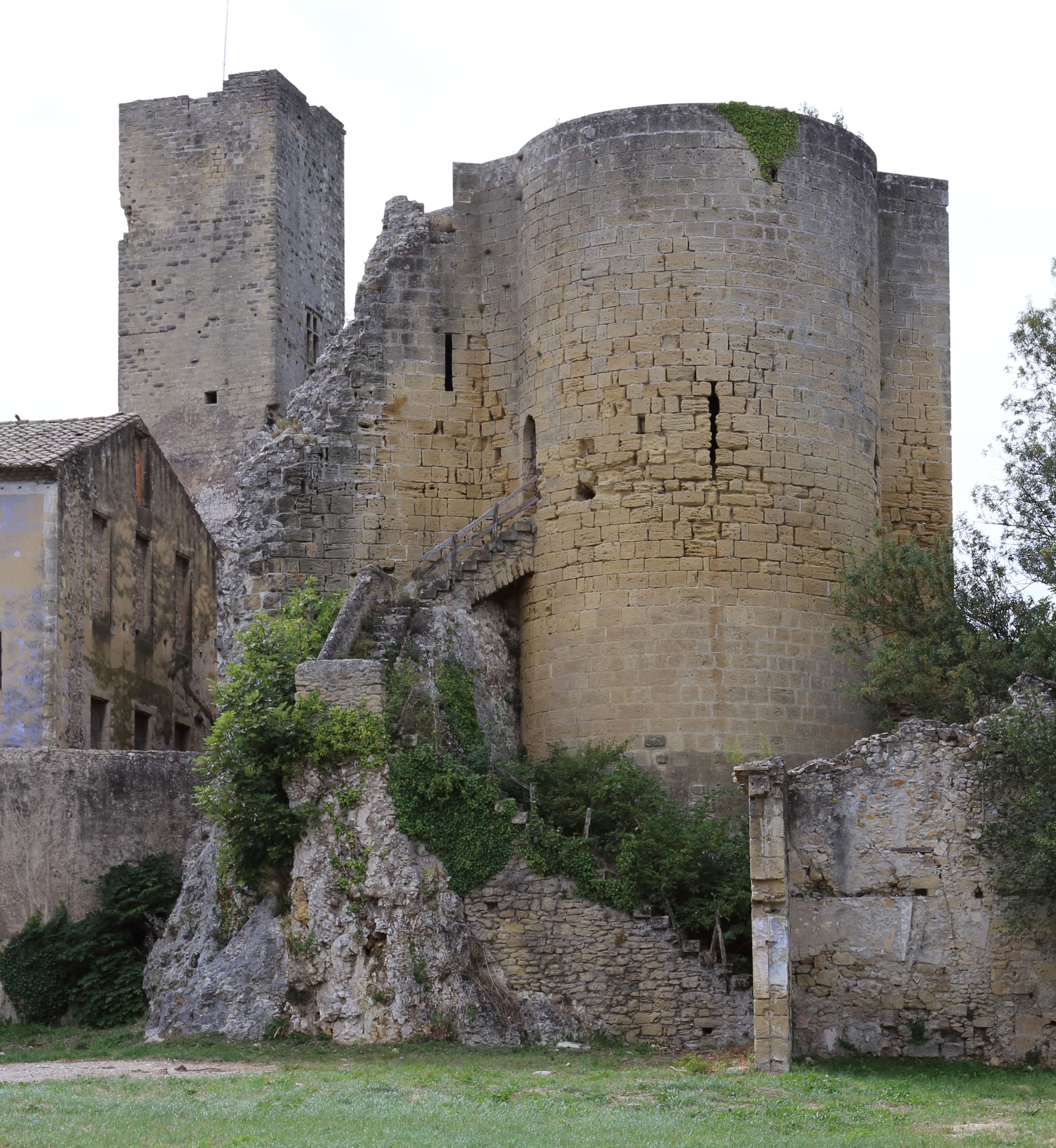
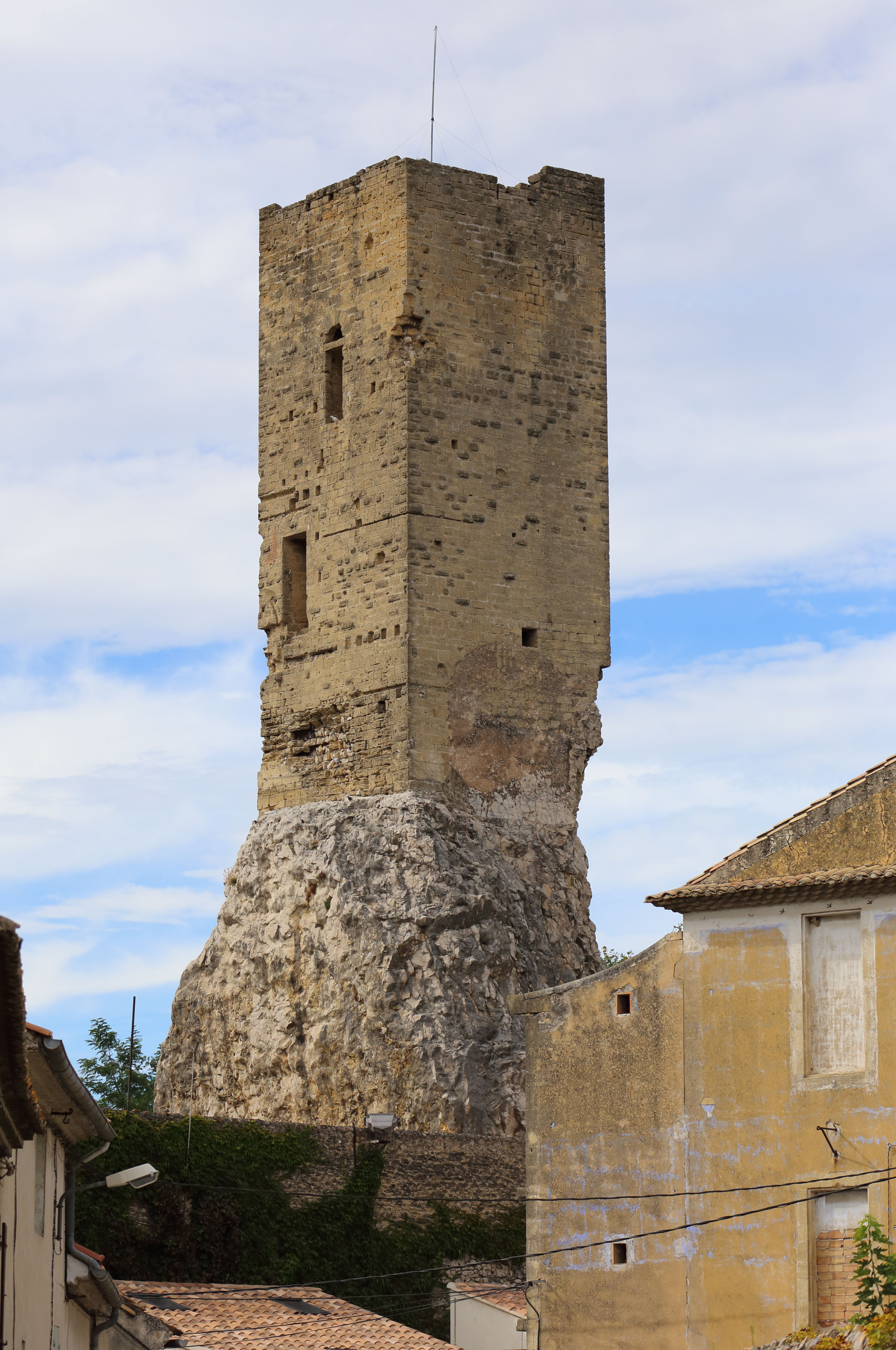
Ruins of the medieval castle

In the medieval period Roquemaure was the site of an important castle that stood on a limestone outcrop in the Rhône. The surviving ruins include two towers, the Square Tower (Tour carrée) and the Round Tower (Tour ronde) that date from the 12th and 13th centuries. Next to the Round Tower are the remains of a toll collector's house that dates from the same period. The ruins are currently privately owned. On the opposite bank of the Rhône is a similar limestone outcrop on which sits the ruins of another medieval castle, the Château de l'Hers. In the Middle Ages the Rhône was somewhat wider at this point than it is today and both castles sat on islands within the river.

The first written record of the Roquemaure castle dates from 1209, on eve of the Albigensian Crusade. The castle at the time was controlled by Raymond VI of Toulouse but on being accused by Pope Innocent III of sheltering heretics, he agreed to donate seven castles, including that of Roquemaure (castrum de Roccamaura), to the papal legate in Avignon. A document from four years later (1213) mentions a tower and a cistern. The tower is almost certainly the existing Square Tower that dominates the ruins. In 1229 the castle was acquired by the French king, Louis IX, in the Treaty of Paris. There are no surviving 13th century documents that give details on the construction of the castle but it is clear from records of the money spent on maintenance that by the beginning of the 14th century the castle included a curtain wall crowned with a parapet that sheltered a number of houses as well as an oven, a large well, a garden containing a second well, a chapel and prisons.

The castle occupied an important position on the border of the territory ruled by the French crown, as at the time, the papacy controlled the Comtat Venaissin on the opposite bank of the Rhône. During the 14th and 15th centuries the castle was the only residence with suitable accommodation for high-ranking dignitaries near the river between Pont-Saint-Esprit and Beaucaire; the Fort Saint-André and the Tour Philippe-le -Bel in Villeneuve-lès-Avignon served only a military function. During this period Roquemaure castle hosted a series of important guests.

In 1314, Pope Clement V, the first pope to be based in Avignon, died at the castle when travelling from Châteauneuf-du-Pape to his birthplace in Gascony. Later in the 14th century, Louis I, Duke of Anjou was a frequent visitor. He was the second son of John II of France and brother of Charles V of France. He used the castle as a base for his negotiations with the popes in Avignon. In 1385 John, Duke of Berry entertained a Hungarian ambassador at the castle while four years later in 1389 Charles VI stayed with a large entourage. Then in 1420 his son Charles Dauphin of Viennois visited the castle. He would become Charles VII of France on his father's death in 1422. Although regularly maintained in this period, the castle gradually ceased to have its earlier importance.

In 1590-1591 during the French Wars of Religion the castle came under siege and parts of towers and walls were destroyed. Subsequently, Louis XIV failed to maintain the building and it fell into a state of disrepair. At the beginning of the 18th century, the arm of the Rhône flowing between the castle and the right bank silted up so that instead of sitting on an island the castle now stood on the bank of the river near the town. After the revolution, the ruined castle was sold off in lots and used as a source of stone for other buildings.

A plan dating from 1752 shows that the castle was entirely constructed on the limestone outcrop. The fortifications included seven round towers of which only the most northerly tower survives. The remaining square tower is 16 to 17 metres (52 to 56 feet) in height and 6.75 metres (22.1 feet) in width. On the limestone base it rises 40 metres (130 feet) above the town.

=== Port on the Rhône ===
At least from the middle of the 17th century, and probably much earlier, the port was situated 400 metres (1,300 feet) to the west of the castle at a position near the present car park and the Cave Granier in the l'Escatillon district of the town. During the 18th century the river deposited silt around the Île de Méimart which increased in size and eventually blocked access to the port. In the 19th century attempts were made to construct a new port just to the north of the Square Tower but the build-up of silt limited the depth of water.

=== Flooding of the town ===
Roquemaure was vulnerable to flooding by the Rhône and on the southern wall of the church there are marks recording the height of the water in the major floods of 1755 and 1840 when most of the town would have been under more than one meter of water. (Note: A block of stone set into the church wall has marks with dates indicating the height of the water on 30 November 1755 and 3 November 1840. Confusingly, the month of November is indicated by the symbol 9^{bre} for the ninth month in the Roman calendar. Maurice Champion records that the flood waters reached a maximum height in Avignon on the 29 or 30 November 1755 and the 2 November 1840.) There was another very destructive flood in May–June 1856. In 1860 the French state agreed to pay two thirds of the cost of the construction of a dyke to protect the town. The dyke began at the Colline Saint-Jean and followed the river south to the village of Sauveterre. It protected the town during the severe flooding of 1935. After World War II the Compagnie Nationale du Rhône began canalizing the river. The section near Roquemaure was completed in the early 1970s.

=== Bridge across the Rhône ===
In 1835 work began on the construction of a suspension bridge over the Rhône at Roquemaure. At the time there was no bridge across the river between Avignon and Pont-Saint-Esprit. The bridge was destroyed by American aircraft in August 1944 during World War II. A chain ferry was then operated across the river until 1959 when the current bridge was opened.

=== Railway station ===
The railway station in Roquemaure was opened in August 1880 on the line running between Le Teil and Grézan-Nîmes on the right bank of the Rhône. The station closed in August 1973 when passenger transport on the line ceased. The line has since been electrified and is now used for freight.

== Church ==
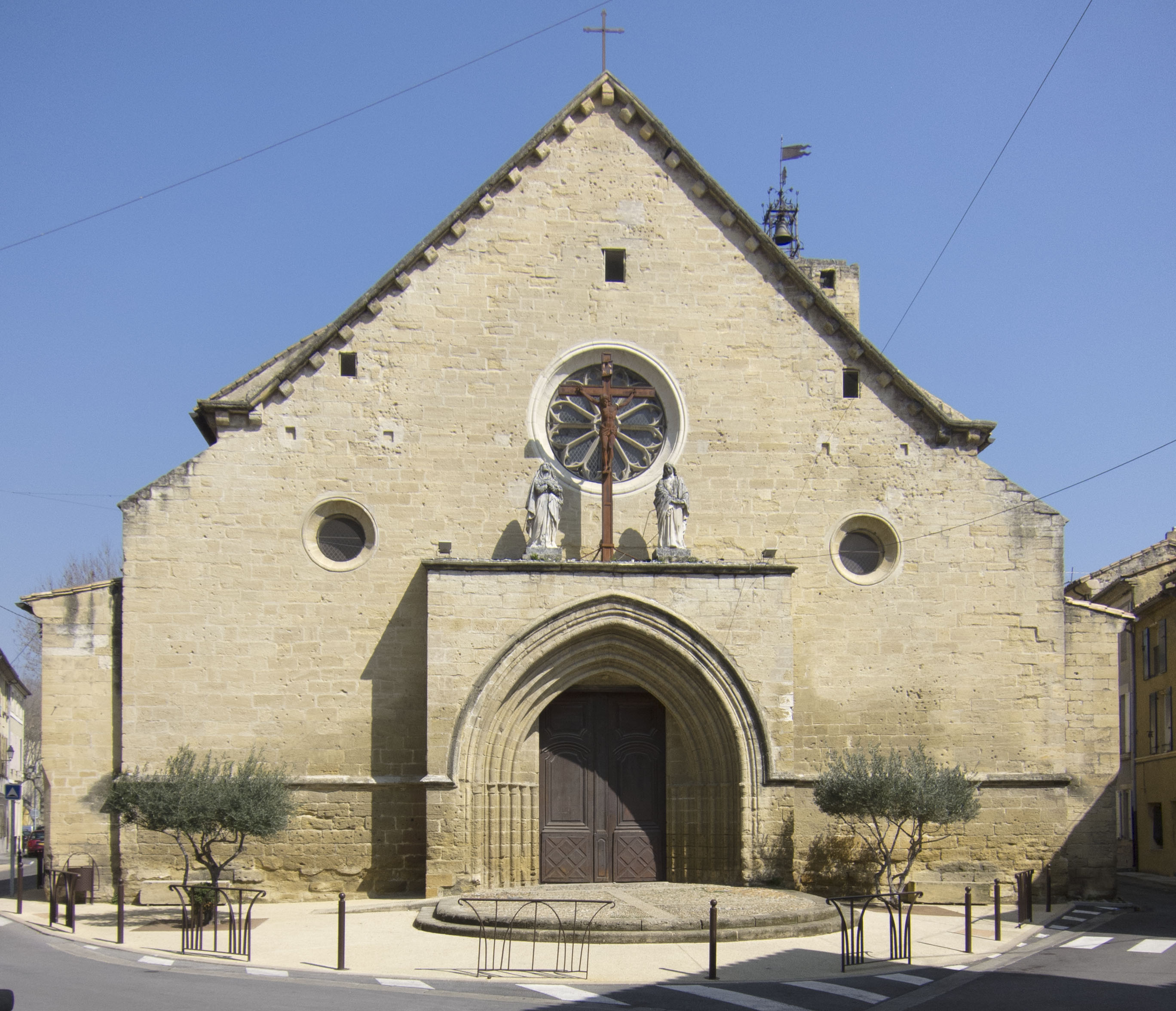
The western end of the parish church

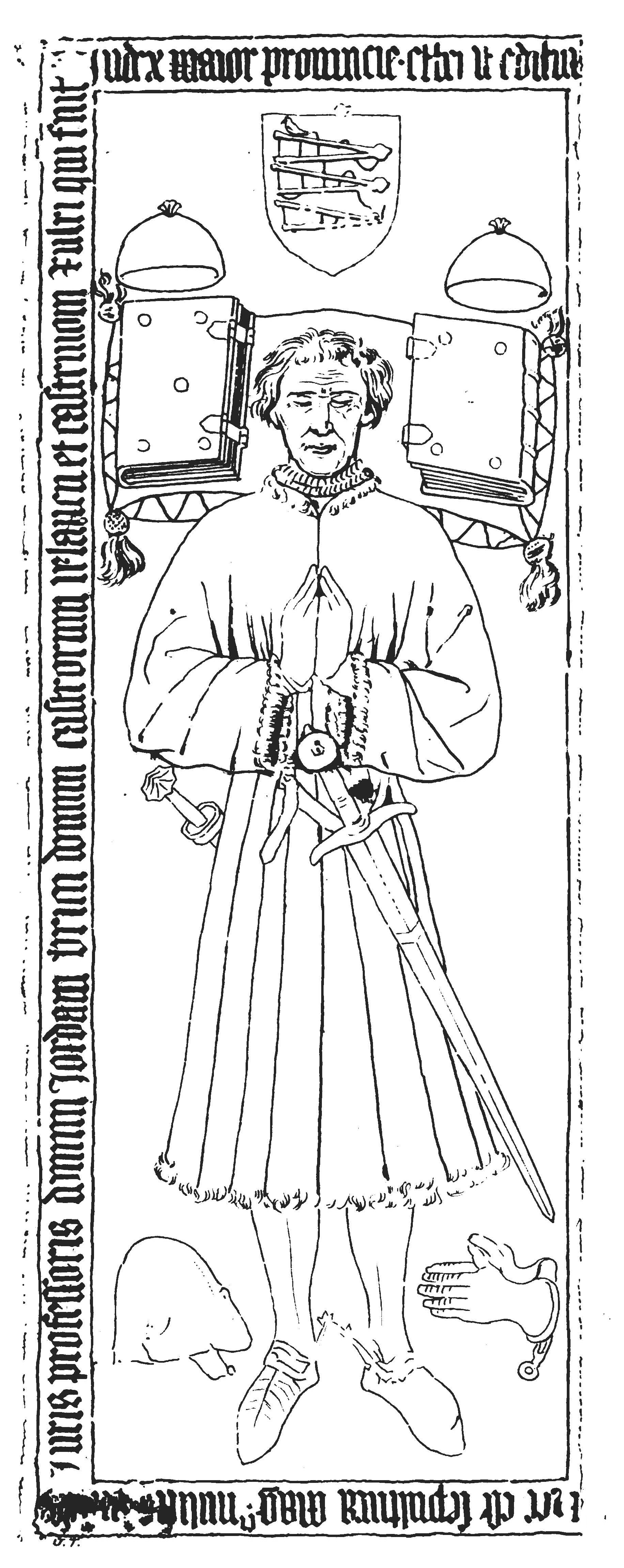
An engraved marble slab dating from the 15th century that is set into the church wall.

The Catholic collegiate church of Saint-Jean-Baptiste and Saint-Jean-l'Evangéliste dates from the first half of the 14th century. It was built in the southern gothic style (gothique méridional) and replaced an earlier church dedicated to Sainte-Marie. (Note: The earlier church of Sainte-Marie is mentioned in a document sent by Louis the Blind to Foucher, the Bishop of Avignon, in 912.) The construction of the present church was initiated by Bertrand du Pouget, a powerful figure in the church hierarchy in the early period of the Avignon Papacy. He was appointed as the cardinal priest of San Marcello by Pope Jean XXII in 1316 and the cardinal bishop of Ostia e Velletri in 1327. In 1345 Pope Clement VI authorised the transfer of the parish services from Sainte-Marie to the new church and the establishment of a collegiate chapter consisting of ten priests and two canons. One of the canons was charged with the spiritual care of the congregation. The chapter was relatively wealthy as it inherited the benefices of the earlier church and gained addition endowments from the founder.

Originally the wooden roof was visible in the church but in the 19th century the timbers were replaced and the vaulting was added.

The third chapel on the right hand side of the nave is the Chapel Saint-Jean which dates from the 15th century. In 1855 a marble slab was discovered under layers of whitewash in the wall. The slab has an engraving of a man and a Latin inscription around three sides; the slab is damaged and the inscription on the fourth side is missing. The text reads: "This is the tomb of the noble master [and] professor of both laws, Lord Jordanus Bricius, Lord of the castles of Velaux and Châteauneuf-le-Rouge, who was chief judge of Provence, and had built..." (Note: In 1876 Germer-Durand published his reading of the Latin text: Hec est sepultura mag[ist]ri militis, utriusq[ue] juris professoris, domini Jordani Bricii, domini castrorum Velaucii et Castrinovi-Rubri, qui fuit judex major Provincie, et fecit edifica ... In 1912 Requin republished the text and suggested that the fifth word was nobilis rather than militis.) Unfortunately the date which presumably would have been on the fourth side and is missing. Velaux and Châteauneuf-le-Rouge are communes in the department of the Bouches-du-Rhône. The stone is now set into the nearby wall of the church.

Jordanus Bricius, whose name is usual written in French as Jourdain Brice, was an important judge and legal scholar. He is believed to have died in either 1433 or 1439. The historian Eugène Germer-Durand when reporting the discovery of the slab suggested that his family name may have been Brès which in the Provençal dialect is similar to the word for a type of trap used to catch birds. This could explain the crest on the slab which includes a small bird above three objects that could be traps. Jourdain Brès may have been born locally as the family name of Brès existed in the neighbouring village of Laudun in the 17th century.

The church contains an organ made in 1690 by the brothers Barthélémy and Honoré Julien from Marseille. It was originally installed in the Couvent des Cordeliers in Avignon but was moved to the church in Roquemaure in around 1820. The walnut casing dates from when the organ was moved.

In the chapel to the right of the main altar is a casket containing some relics of Saint Valentine. These were extracted from the catacomb of Saint Hippolytus in Rome and given by Pope Pius IX to Maximilien Pichaud, a local dignitary. They were placed in the church in a ceremony led by Claude-Henri Plantier, the bishop of Nîmes, in October 1868.

== Chapels ==
Chapel of Saint-Agricol d'Albaret

The ruins of the Chapel Saint-Agricol d'Albaret are 6 kilometres (3.7 miles) southwest of the town next to the A9 autoroute. (Note: The Latin name of the Chapel of Saint-Agricol d'Albaret was Ecclesia Sancti Agricoli de Albareto. The ruins are located at 44°1′15″N 4°44′14″E.) The chapel was once part of a priory belonging to the Benedictine Abbey of Saint-André in Villeneuve-lès-Avignon. The word "Albaret" is the name of a small village that was served by the chapel in the Middle Ages. The earliest mention of the priory is when the benefice was donated to the bishop of Avignon sometime between 1104 and 1110. The bishop passed on the benefice to the Abbey of Saint-André. The records show that in 1845 the building was in a reasonable state of repair and that in 1881 a mass was celebrated in the chapel.

The chapel has a semi-circular apse at the eastern end which is built of carefully laid stonework. The choir is similarly well constructed except high up where rubble masonry is used. The two buttresses at the western end of the choir show evidence of having been modified. The walls of the nave, which now lacks a roof, are built with irregular blocks of stone. The western door, which is surmounted by a niche and an oculus, appear to date from the 17th century. The chapel must have once had a graveyard as excavations carried out in 1989 in an area to the southeast unearthed 22 burials dating from the High Middle Ages. The oldest parts of the chapel are in the early Romanesque style and probably date from the 11th century. The choir was reconstructed in the 12th century and then in the 17th century the building was restored and the murals added.

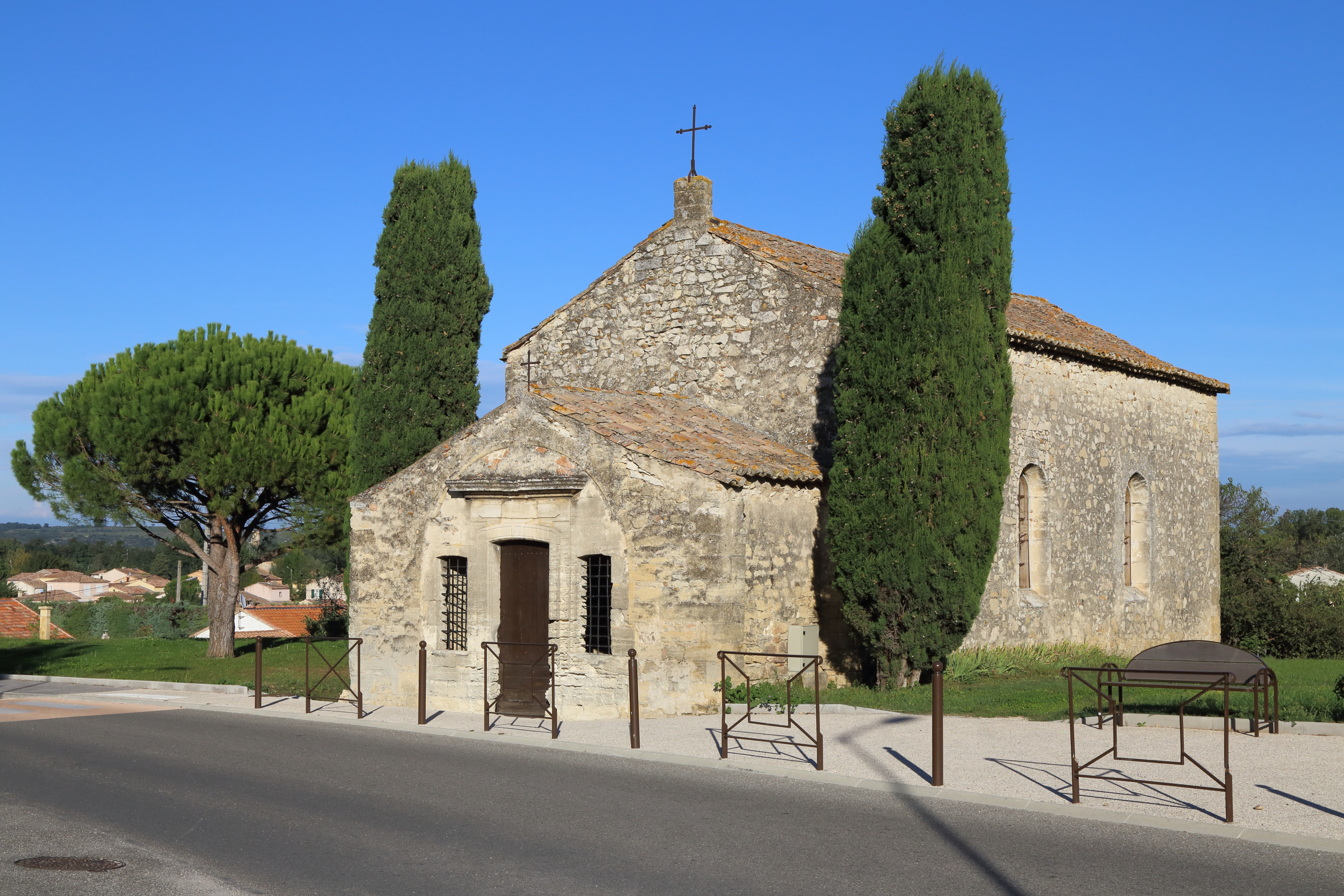
Chapel of Saint Joseph des Champs

Chapel of Saint-Sauveur in Truel

The Chapel of Saint-Sauveur is in the hamlet of Truel which is 2.3 kilometres (1.4 miles) south of the Roquemaure. (Note: The Latin name of the Chapel of Saint-Sauveur was Ecclesia Sancti Salvatoris de Torcularibus. It is located at 44°2′3″N 4°46′28″E.) This chapel was also once part of a priory belonging to the Abbey of Saint-André. It is now a private house. The chapel differs from others belonging to the abbey in having a more complex architecture and a plan in the form of a Latin cross.

Chapel of Saint Joseph des Champs

The Chapel of Saint Joseph des Champs is 1.3 kilometres (0.8 miles) southwest of the town on the south side of the D976 to Tavel. (Note: The Chapel of Saint Joseph des Champs is located at 44°2′32″N 4°46′15″E.) Roman shards have been uncovered nearby suggesting that the chapel may have been built on the site of an earlier Roman building.

== Population ==
In 1384 Roquemaure was the chef-lieu of one of the 13 vigueries in the sénéchaussée of Beaucaire and Nîmes. It was the site of a royal castle and a large collegiate church with 10 priests. In spite of this, the village itself was very small with only 5 hearths. Within the Roquemaure viguerie Lirac had 3 hearths, Tavel 5, Saint-Geniès-de-Comolas 13 and Saint-Laurent-des-Arbres 30. Bagnols-sur-Cèze was the chef-lieu of a neighbouring viguerie and had 115 hearths. Four centuries later in 1789, on the eve of the French Revolution, Roquemaure had 929 hearths and was similar in size to Bagnol which had 1085.

Historical population

Year	Pop.	±% p.a.
1793	3,300	—
1800	3,506	+0.87%
1806	3,539	+0.16%
1821	3,759	+0.40%
1831	4,138	+0.97%
1836	4,388	+1.18%
1841	4,471	+0.38%
1846	4,507	+0.16%
1851	3,795	−3.38%
1856	3,704	−0.48%
1861	3,649	−0.30%
1866	3,543	−0.59%
1872	3,211	−1.63%
1876	3,008	−1.62%
1881	2,860	−1.00%
1886	2,666	−1.40%
1891	2,461	−1.59%
1896	2,391	−0.58%
1901	2,304	−0.74%

Year	Pop.	±% p.a.
1906	2,221	−0.73%
1911	2,219	−0.02%
1921	1,963	−1.22%
1926	1,996	+0.33%
1931	2,052	+0.55%
1936	2,118	+0.64%
1946	2,109	−0.04%
1954	2,138	+0.17%
1962	2,925	+4.00%
1968	3,411	+2.59%
1975	3,646	+0.96%
1982	4,053	+1.52%
1990	4,647	+1.72%
1999	4,848	+0.47%
2007	5,207	+0.90%
2012	5,421	+0.81%
2017	5,481	+0.22%
2023	5,529	+0.15%

Source: Cassini, INSEE

== Wine ==
Winemaking was probably introduced into Rhône valley by Greek colonists around 600 BC. Archaeological excavations carried out at La Ramière suggests that wine, or possibly olive oil, was being produced at the site in the second half of the 1st century AD. The earliest written mention of viticulture in Roquemaure is by Gervase of Tilbury in his Otia Imperialia which was completed around 1214. An English translation of the Latin text is:

In the Rhône stands the castle of Roquemaure. They judge that the castle itself belongs to the empire, which has rights over the river, while its estate belongs to the kingdom of France, which owns the land-rights. On the estate of this castle there are vines which the people call brumestae, producing good fat grapes. These vines flower and produce clusters of grapes as ordinary vines do, but then they cheat their husbandman's expectation: for when it comes to the feast of St John the Baptist [24 June], all the fruit vanishes, and nothing which might have grown into fruit is found on them. (Note: There is a vine disorder called coulure in which the flowers fail to set.)

The earliest mention of wine being exported from Roquemaure is in the accounts of the papal court in Avignon of Innocent VI. In 1357 they record the purchase of 20 barrels from "Guillelmo Malrepacis", a local merchant. The port on the Rhône allowed wine produced in Roquemaure and the surrounding villages to be easily exported. In 1735 more than 8,000 barrels a year were being shipped from the port.

The current law for the Côtes du Rhône Appellation d'origine contrôlée dates only from 1937, but there is a long history of attempts to regulate the quality of the wine from the region. In 1737 the Conseil d'Etat issued a royal decree on the production of wine in Roquemaure. It specified that neither wine nor harvested grapes could be brought into town from outside the area and to prevent wines from a poor vintage being passed off as coming from a better vintage, barrels of wine from Roquemaure and the surrounding villages had to be marked on one end using a hot iron, with the letters "CDR" for Côte du Rhône and the year. The surrounding villages were listed as Tavel, Lirac, Saint-Laurent-des-Arbres, Saint-Geniès-de-Comolas, Orsan, Chusclan, Codolet and "others of high quality". The decree also suggested that it would help to prevent fraud if the barrels were marked with the name of the parish of origin. Another decree issued in the same year complained about the poor quality of the barrels used for the wine and specified that they should be manufactured in two standard sizes.

=== Phylloxera ===
Roquemaure is believed to be the site where phylloxera, an insect that attacks the roots of grapevines, was first introduced into France from North America. In 1862 a local wine merchant, Mr. Borty, received a case containing rooted American vines from a New York vine-grower, Mr. Carle. This case contained native grapevines, including 'Clinton', 'Post-Oak', and 'Emily'. Mr. Borty, planted these American vines in ten rows within his walled garden at 21 rue Longue (renamed rue Placide Cappeau). The following summer in a vineyard at the nearby village of Pujaut, a number of vines began to die. By 1864 Borty's own Grenache and Alicante vines were showing symptoms of phylloxera infection. All the vines in the neighbouring village of Pujaut were either dead or dying by 1865 and the initial infection had spread to the towns of Orange and St-Rémy. By the end of 1868 the whole of the lower Rhône Valley was infected and by 1890 phylloxera had spread across most of France.

=== Winemaking cooperative ===
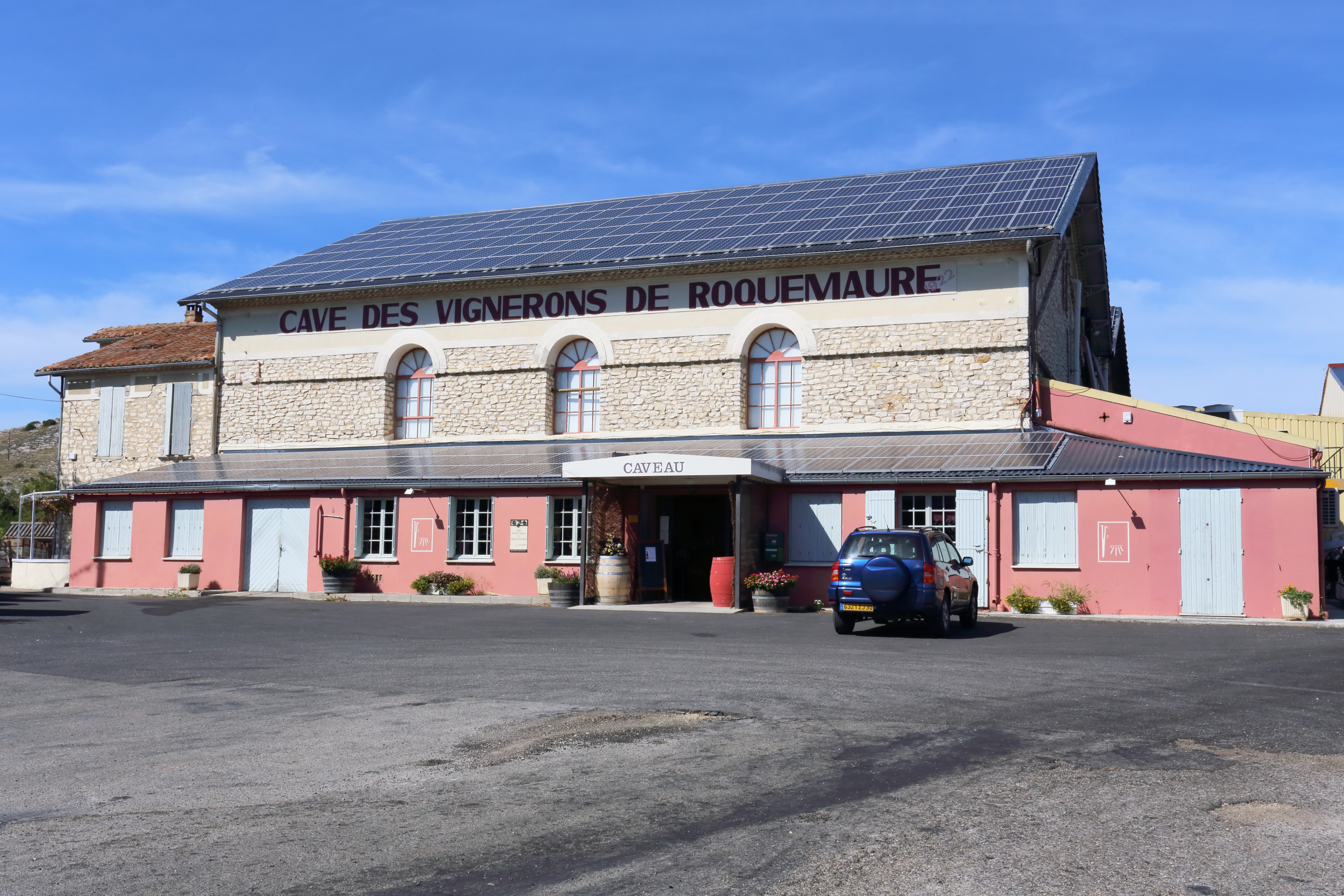
The cellars of the Vignerons de Roquemaure

The winemaking cooperative, "Les Vignerons de Roquemaure", was established in 1922 and in 2013 had 60 members who together cultivated 360 hectares (890 acres) of vineyard spread over nine different communes. Roughly half the vineyards are classed as Appellation d'Origine Contrôlée (AOC) and the remainder as Indication Géographique Protégée (IGP).

The cooperative produces several types of wine or appellation with each appellation having an associated set of legal regulations. The most restrictive appellation is for the cru or vintage wines that are labelled as "Tavel" or "Lirac". Tavel is a small village 8 kilometres (5.0 miles) southwest of Roquemaure that produces grapes for rosé wines. Lirac is a small village 7.5 kilometres (4.7 miles) to the west of Roquemaure, but the wines labelled as "Lirac" come from grapes grown in 715 hectares (1,770 acres) of designated vineyards that are scattered over the four communes of Lirac, Roquemaure, Saint-Laurent-des-Arbres and Saint-Geniès-de-Comolas. AOC Lirac is produced by 44 winemakers and 5 different cooperatives including the cooperative in Roquemaure. The cooperative in Roquemaure also produces a wine classified as "Côtes du Rhône Villages" with the village specified as Laudun. Laudun is 11 kilometres (6.8 miles) northwest of Roquemaure and is one of 18 villages in the "Côtes du Rhône Villages" appellation that is allowed to add the village name. Wines with the Côtes du Rhône appellation are produced using grapes grown in vineyards designated as suitable. Vineyards outside these "Côtes du Rhône" designated areas are used to produce wines classed as Indication Géographique Protégée.

The vineyards for Appellation d'Origine Contrôlée wines are planted with traditional grape varieties: Grenache, Syrah, Mourvèdre and Carignan for red wines, Clairette, Viognier, Grenache blanc and Bourboulenc for white wines. The proportions allowed of each variety are specified in the regulations for each appellation. The regulations for red wines specify a minimum percentage of Grenache grapes of between 40 and 50 percent. For the Indication Géographique Protégée category a wider range of grape varieties are grown including "international" varieties such as Merlot, Cabernet-Sauvignon and Chardonnay.

== Schools ==
There are three state schools in Roquemaure. The nursery school, L'École maternelle Francette Prade, is attended by around 200 children between the ages of three and six. The primary school, Jean Vilar and Albert Camus, is attended by 330 children between the ages of six and eleven while the secondary school, Collège Paul Valéry, is attended by 650 children up to the age of fifteen. Older children attend a Lycée in one of the nearby towns to study for the Baccalauréat. The nearest is the Lycée Jean Vilar in Villeneuve-lès-Avignon.

== Local events ==
A weekly market is held every Tuesday morning on the Place de la Marie.

An annual festival (Fête Votive) is held in the village around the 16 August, the feast day of Saint Roch. A travelling funfair occupies the Place de la Pousterle, and local associations organise outdoor evening meals with live music. A popular event is the running of young bulls through the narrow streets of the town.

== People ==
- Pope Clement V died in Roquemaure Castle in 1314.
- Jacques Bridaine, a Roman Catholic preacher, was born in Chusclan in 1701 and died in Roquemaure in 1767.
- Louis Pierre de Cubières, a French naturalist, was born in Roquemaure in 1747 and died in 1821.
- Michel de Cubières, a French writer and brother of Louis Pierre, was born in Roquemaure in 1752 and died in Paris in 1820.
- Placide Cappeau, (1808–1877) a French writer, was born and died in Roquemaure. He wrote Minuit, chrétiens (O Holy Night) (1847), which was set to music by Adolphe Adam. He also wrote a historic poem, Le Château de Roquemaure.

== See also ==
- fr:Orgue Jullien de la collégiale Saint-Jean-Baptiste de Roquemaure: French Wikipedia article on the 17th-century church organ.
- Communes of the Gard department

== Sources ==
- Baluzius, Stephanus, ed. (1682), "Processus Negotii Raymundi Comitis Tolosani", Epistolarum Innocentii III (in Latin), vol. 2, Paris: F. Muguet, p. 346.
- Bouillet, M.-N. (1869), Dictionnaire Universel d'Histoire et de Géographie (in French) (21 ed.), Paris: L. Hachette, OL 20553016M.
- Breton, René (2001), "Le prieuré Saint-Agricol d'Albaret (Roquemaure, Gard)", in Barruol, Guy; Bacou, Roseline; Girard, Alain (eds.), L'Abbaye Saint-André-lès-Avignon: histoire, archéologie, rayonnement (in French), Mane, Alpes-de-Haute-Provence, France: Alpes de Lumière, pp. 333–336, ISBN 2-906162-54-X.
- Bruguier-Tichit, Isabelle (2010), Memoire en Images: Roquemaure (in French), Saint-Cyr-sur-Loire, Indre-et-Loire, France: Alan Sutton, ISBN 978-2-8138-0145-6.
- Clément, Pierre-Albert (2001), "Les possessions de l'abbaye sur la rive droite du Rhône: Saint-Sauveur du Truel", in Barruol, Guy; Bacou, Roseline; Girard, Alain (eds.), L'Abbaye Saint-André-lès-Avignon: histoire, archéologie, rayonnement (in French), Mane, Alpes-de-Haute-Provence, France: Alpes de Lumière, p. 238, ISBN 2-906162-54-X.
- Campbell, Christy (2004), Phylloxera - How wine was saved for the world, London: Harper Perennial, ISBN 978-0-00-711536-5.
- Champion, Maurice (1862), Les inondations en France depuis le VIe siècle jusqu'a nos jours (in French), vol. 4, Paris: V. Dalmont.
- Durand, Albert (1909), "État religieux des trois diocèse de Nimes, d'Uzès et d'Alais à la fin de l'ancien régime: Chapitre II", Revue du Midi (in French), 42: 578–596.
- Durieu, René (1997), L'Auteur du "Minuit, chrétiens", Placide Cappeau (in French), Nîmes: C. Lacour.
- Eubel, Konrad (1913), Hierarchia Catholica Medii Aevi (in Latin), vol. 1, Regensberg: Monasterii, pp. 15, 36, 43.
- Germer-Durand, Eugène (1868), "Roquemaure", Dictionnaire topographique du département du Gard comprenant les noms de lieu anciens et modernes (in French), Paris: Imprimerie Impérial, p. 188.
- Germer-Durand, Eugène (1876), Découvertes archéologiques faites à Nîmes et dans le Gard pendant l'année 1872 (in French), Nîmes: A. Catélan, pp. 79–82. (Text only accessible within the US)
- Gervase of Tilbury (2002), "102: The clusters of grapes of Roquemaure", in Banks, S.E.; Binns, J.W. (eds.), Otia Imperialia: Recreation for an Emperor (in Latin and English), Oxford: Clarendon Press, pp. 758–759, ISBN 978-0-19-820288-2.
- Goiffon, Etienne Marthe (1881), Dictionnaire topographique, statistique et historique du diocèse de Nimes (in French), Nîmes: Grimaud.
- Limasset, Auguste (1908), "Réglementation du vin dans la province de Languedoc et particulièrement à Roquemaure au XVIIe et au XVIIIe siècles", Mémoires de l'Académie de Vaucluse, 2nd series (in French), 8: 273–297. Reprinted as a booklet: Limasset, Auguste (1908), Réglementation du vin dans la province de Languedoc et particulièrement à Roquemaure au XVIIe et au XVIIIe siècles (in French), Avignon: F. Seguin.
- Livingstone-Learmonth, John; Master, Melvyn C.H. (1983), The Wines of the Rhône (2nd ed.), London: Faber and Faber, ISBN 0-571-18075-2.
- Maigret, Chantal (2003), "Le château oublié de Roquemaure (Gard) (XIe-XIXe siècles)", Archéologie du Midi Médiéval (in French), 21: 115–139, doi:10.3406/amime.2003.1402.
- Manniez, Y. (1994), "La nécropole médiévale de l'Esperelle à Roquemaure", Archéologie du Midi Médiéval (in French), 12: 181–188, doi:10.3406/amime.1994.1264.
- Ménard, M. (1752), Histoire civile, ecclésiastique, et littéraire de la ville de Nismes, avec les preuves (in French and Latin), vol. 3, Paris: Hugues-Daniel Chaubert.
- Nègre, Ernest (1990), Toponymie générale de la France: Tome 1, Formations préceltiques, celtiques romanes: étymologie de 35000 noms de lieux (in French), Geneva: Librairie Droz, ISBN 2-600-02883-8.
- Pardé, Maurice (1936), "La grande crue du Rhône en novembre 1935", Revue de géographie alpine (in French), 24 (24–2): 395–420, doi:10.3406/rga.1936.3535.
- Petitot, Hervé; Buffat, Loïc (1999), "221: Roquemaure", in Provost, Michel (ed.), Carte archéologique de la Gaule: 30/3. Gard, Volume 30; Volume 33 (in French), Paris: Éditions de la Maison des sciences de l'homme, pp. 538–546, ISBN 2-87754-066-9. A survey of the archaeological finds in the commune of Roquemaure up to 1999.
- Proctor, Dennis (1971), Hannibals's March in History, Oxford: Clarendon Press.
- Requin, M.H. (1912), "Laugier Sapor: Evêque de Gap et Chancelier de Provence", Bulletin de la Société d'études des Hautes-Alpes, 4th (in French and Latin), 41: 197–278.
- Rivoire, Hector (1842), "Roquemaure", Statistique du département du Gard (in French), vol. 2, Nîmes: Ballivet et Fabre, pp. 700–703.
- Schäfer, Karl Heinrich, ed. (1914), Die ausgaben der Apostolischen kammer unter Benedikt XII, Klemens VI und Innocenz VI (1335-1362) (in German and Latin), Paderborn, Germany: F. Schöningh, OL 6653164M.
