= Sauveterre, Gard =

Sauveterre
- Commune
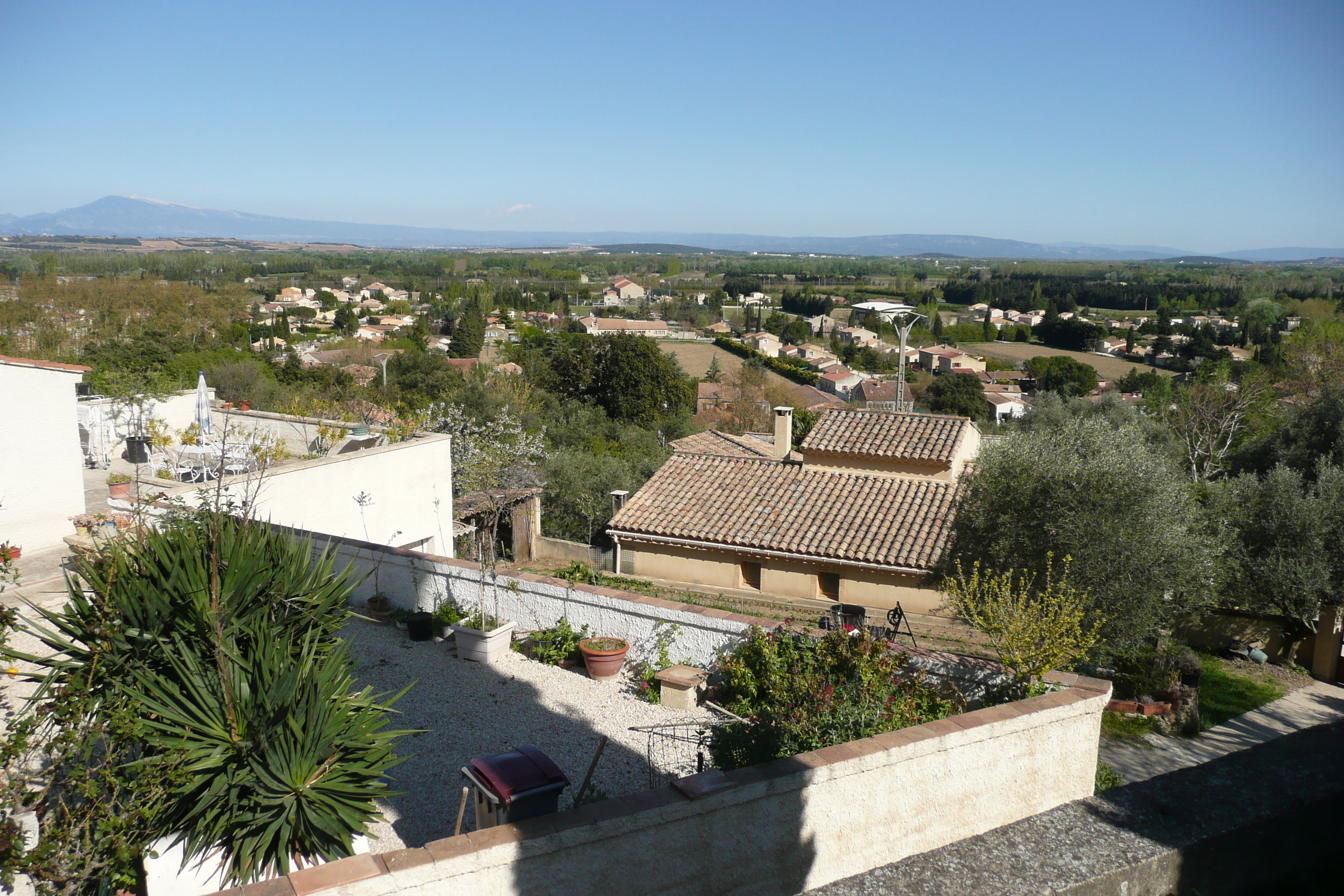
- Sauveterre, with the Mont Ventoux in the background (left)

- Coat of arms
- Location of Sauveterre
- Location within France Location within Occitanie
- Coordinates: 44°01′35″N 4°47′38″E
- Country: France
- Region: Occitania
- Department: Gard
- Arrondissement: Nîmes
- Canton: Roquemaure
- Intercommunality: CA Grand Avignon

Government
  - Mayor (2020–2026): Jacques Demanse
- Area^{1}: 13.09 km^{2} (5.05 sq mi)
- Elevation: 98 m (322 ft)
- Highest elevation: 140 m (460 ft)
- Lowest elevation: 12 m (39 ft)
- Population (2023): 2,025
  - Density: 154.7/km^{2} (400.7/sq mi)
- Time zone: UTC+01:00 (CET)
  - Summer (DST): UTC+02:00 (CEST)
- INSEE/Postal code: 30312 /30150
- ^{1} French Land Register data, which excludes lakes, ponds, glaciers > 1 km^{2} (0.386 sq mi or 247 acres) and river estuaries.

Sauveterre (French pronunciation: [sovtɛʁ]; Occitan: Sauvatèrra) is a commune in the Gard department in southern France.

== Geography ==
The village is located between the towns of Villeneuve-lès-Avignon in the south and Roquemaure in the north, and bounded by the Rhône River in the east, and the commune of Pujaut in the west.

== Amenities ==
The village is primarily a farming community, with a dozen or so shops providing essential local foodstuffs and services, including bakeries, a hairdresser, a grocery, a video rental, two bar-restaurants, a car repair garage, a post office, the town hall and community centre, and a small modern housing development.

The main road runs along the foot of a steep escarpment on which the majority of the older houses are located in a labyrinth of steep narrow lanes. To the east of the road the farmland land is the flat former flood plain of the Rhone River, and is planted mainly with apples, melons, pumpkins, asparagus, and market garden produce from organic agriculture.

== Administration ==
Sauveterre is part of the canton of Roquemaure that also includes the communes of Laudun, Lirac, Montfaucon, Saint-Geniès-de-Comolas, Saint-Laurent-des-Arbres, Saint-Victor-la-Coste and Tavel.

== History ==
The village has existed as a small hamlet with a parish priest since medieval times and was annexed by Roquemaure in 1442.

== Population ==
Historical population
Year	Pop.	±% p.a.
1968	913	—
1975	911	−0.03%
1982	1,159	+3.50%
1990	1,378	+2.19%
1999	1,696	+2.33%
2007	1,838	+1.01%
2012	1,731	−1.19%
2017	2,036	+3.30%
2023	2,025	−0.09%
Source: INSEE

== Sights ==
- Château de Montsauve 17th century
- Château de Varenne 1778
- Church 19th century restored : Monumental exterior stairway, Interior : Virgin and Christ painted by Guirand de Scevola .
- Chapel of Notre-Dame de Four, early 13th century, restored.
- remains of a monastery: Notre-Dame-des-Fours.

== See also ==
- Communes of the Gard department
