= Lirac AOC =

Southern Rhône wine appelation

Coordinates: 44°02′12″N 4°41′27″E

- Wine region
- Official name: Lirac AOC
- Type: AOC
- Year established: 1945
- Years of wine industry: 2,000
- Country: France
- Part of: Rhône Valley
- Other regions in Rhône Valley: Laudun AOC
- Climate region: Mediterranean
- Soil conditions: sandy, loess, quartzite pebbles
- Size of planted vineyards: 700
- No. of vineyards: 100
- Grapes produced: Grenache blanc, Grenache noir, Syrah, Mourvèdre, Cinsault, Carignan, Bourboulenc, Clairette, Ugni blanc, Picpoul, Marsanne, rousanne, viognier
- No. of wineries: 53
- Wine produced: red, white, rosé
- Comments: 2005

Lirac (French pronunciation: [liʁak]) is a wine-growing Appellation d'Origine Contrôlée (AOC) in the department of Gard situated in the low hills along the right bank of the Rhône river in the southern Rhône wine region of France. It is named after the village of Lirac. Bordering on the neighbouring cru of Tavel AOC, a rosé-only cru in the next village, Lirac is one of the 13 crus of the Rhône valley family. Châteauneuf-du-Pape AOC is across the Rhône from it.

== History ==
Lirac wines were appreciated by the royal and papal courts in Avignon at the time of the schism. Pope Innocent VI ordered 20 casks of wine from there in 1357 and Henry IV of France and Louis XIV served them regularly at court, where they were called simple Rhône wine. In the mid-17th century the right-bank district of the Côte du Rhône had issued regulations to govern the quality of its wine and in 1737 the king ordered that casks of Lirac wine shipped from the nearby river port of Roquemaure should be branded with the letters CDR to introduce a system of protecting its origin. The rules for its Côte du Rhône thus formed the very early basis of today's nationwide AOC system governed by the INAO. Production was very high in those days: in 1774 the vintage yielded more than 8000 hl. of wine. In 1863 phylloxera arrived in Lirac. In fact, a winemaker at Château de Clary may have been responsible for introducing it. The name was changed to Côtes du Rhône when the left-bank wines were included in the appellation some hundred years later. The appellation received full recognition by a High Court decision in 1937. In the 1930s, Count Henri de Régis, the owner of the Château de Ségriès in the heart of the village of Lirac improved the quality of his wines until in 1945 he obtained the highest distinction, a cru, of the Côtes du Rhône. Two years later in 1947 the appellation was confirmed by government decree. Lirac is the oldest wine in the Côtes du Rhône region and was the first to be produced in all three colours: red, rosé, and white.

In recent years, the planted vineyard area of Lirac has been increasing, and more high-quality wines are being produced.

== Climate and geography ==
The village of Lirac lies to the west of the Rhone in the department of Gard, a little over 10 km due west of Châteauneuf-du-Pape which is on the opposite side of the river. Besides Lirac itself, the appellation includes the villages of Saint Laurent des Arbres, Saint Géniès de Comolas and Roquemaure which forms a girdle around the appellation. The terroir in Lirac is somewhat similar to Châteauneuf-du-Pape both in variety and hours of sun (2700). The best terroir for red wine is perhaps on the windy plateau Vallongue, shared with Tavel that is only 5 km. away. In the relatively newly planted vineyards one finds plenty of galets roulés that retain heat. The area is slightly cooler that the lowlands.

== Wines ==
Detailed map of the Rhône wine region, with separate maps of Southern Rhône ("Zoom A") and Northern Rhône ("Zoom B"). The Lirac AOC is marked in brown on "Zoom A" and is situated between Orange and Avignon.

Red wines are made from Grenache noir (minimum 40%), Syrah and Mourvèdre (minimum of 25% together), Cinsault, and Carignan (maximum 10%).

Rosé: The same varieties are used as for the red, and up to 20% of the allowed varieties for white wine may be used.

White wines are produced from Clairette, Grenache blanc and Bourboulenc. No variety may be used in a proportion greater than 60%.

The minimum alcohol for all three colours is decreed at 11.5%.

The style of red Lirac often resembles a soft Côtes du Rhône-Villages, but the more ambitious wines are often similar to Châteauneuf-du-Pape. Rosé Lirac is usually similar to Tavel.

== Economy ==
The Lirac wines are produced by a total of 100 concerns which include 93 growers, 43 private wineries, 6 cooperative wineries, and one producer/merchant. Many producers in Châteauneuf-du-Pape also produce Lirac wine.

The vineyards are located in the four communes of Lirac, Saint-Laurent-des-Arbres, Saint-Geniès-de-Comolas, and Roquemaure.

== See also ==
- Rhône (wine region)
- Côtes du Rhône AOC
