= Tavel =

Tavel may refer to:

== Places ==
- Tavel, Gard, a commune in France
- Tavel AOC, a French wine appellation from the town of Tavel
- Tafers (French: Tavel), a municipality in Switzerland

== People ==
- Connie Tavel, American television and film executive producer and talent manager
- Ronald Tavel (1936–2009), American writer, director and actor
