= Louis Pierre de Cubières =

French writer

Simon Louis Pierre, marquis de Cubières, brother of Michel de Cubières (1747, Roquemaure, Gard – 1821) was a French writer.

He was écuyer of Louis XVI and continued to support him throughout the French Revolution, refusing to emigrate and escape the massacres of the nobility. He devoted his spare time to sciences and literature, writing a Histoire des coquillages de mer, 1799, in-4, and several poems and comedies, including the Charlatan. Amédée Despans-Cubières was his illegitimate son.
