= Michel de Cubières =

French writer

Michel, chevalier de Cubières (27 September 1752 – 23 August 1820) was an 18th-century French writer, known under the pen-names of Palmézaux and Dorat-Cubières, taking the latter name as he had Claude Joseph Dorat as his master.

He was born in Roquemaure, Gard, and was the brother of Louis Pierre de Cubières.

He wrote short verses for the Almanachs and the Étrennes lyriques of the time, and a large number of plays and "écrits de circonstance". He backed the French Revolution, being made secretary to the Paris Commune and pronouncing an Elogy on Jean-Paul Marat.

He was a lover of Fanny de Beauharnais and collaborated, with Claude Joseph Dorat, on some of her writings. He died in Paris, aged 67.

== Publications ==
=== Essays ===
- 1773: Lettre d'un solitaire de Chalcide à une dame romaine, suivie de pièces fugitives.
- 1780: Les Hochets de ma jeunesse.
- 1789: L'École des filles, histoire morale, Read online
- 1789: Les États-Généraux de Cythère, very free imitation from Italian of Count Algarotti, Read online
- 1811: Histoire des compagnes de Maria, ou Épisodes de la vie d'une jolie femme.

=== Literary critics ===
History of literature

- 1787: Lettre à M. le Mis de Ximenès, sur l'influence de Boileau en littérature Text online
- 1792: Poésies philosophiques et descriptives des auteurs qui se sont distingués dans le dix-huitième siècle, 3 vol.
- 1796: Le Progrès des arts dans la République, poem.
- 1799: Le Défenseur de la philosophie, ou Réponse à quelques satires dirigées contre la fin du XVIIIe siècle, Text online
- 1802: Boileau jugé par ses amis et par ses ennemis, ou le Pour et le Contre sur Boileau.
- 1810: Recueil des pièces intéressantes sur les arts, les sciences et la littérature, ouvrage posthume de Sylvain Bailly, précédé de la vie littéraire et politique de cet homme illustre.

Didactics

- 1812: L'Art du quatrain, essai didactique en IV chants, suivi d'un grand nombre de quatrains sur les monuments français d'architecture, de peinture, de sculpture, de gravure, etc.; d'un poème sur le progrès des arts et de quelques distiques.
- 1812: Essai sur l’art poétique en général, et en particulier sur la versification française, Paris.

Apologies

- 1780: Éloge de Voltaire, composé par Voltaire lui-même, Text online
- 1782: Éloge de Claude Joseph Dorat, suivi de poésies qui lui sont relatives, d'une apologie de Colardeau, d'un dialogue intitulé Gilbert et une Furie, de la Vengeance de Pluton, et de quelques pièces détachées.
- 1783: Fontenelle jugé par ses pairs, ou Éloge de Fontenelle, en forme de dialogue entre trois académiciens, des Académies française, des sciences et des belles-lettres.
- 1811: Jenner, ou Le triomphe de la vaccine, Text online
- 1792: Les Rivaux au cardinalat, ou la Mort de l'abbé Mauri, poème héroï-comique en trois chants, Text online
- 1800: Les Petits-Saints, ou Épître à Chénier, pour servir de supplément aux Nouveaux Saints, Text online
- 1816: Chamousset, ou la Poste aux lettres, poëme en 4 chants, précédé d'une dissertation historique sur l'origine, l'usage et l'utilité des postes.

=== Political writings ===
Political essays

- 1789: Voyage à la Bastille, fait le 16 juillet 1789, et adressé à Mme de G., à Bagnols, en Languedoc, Text online
- 1791: Les États-Généraux du Parnasse, de l'Europe, de l'Église et de Cythère, ou les Quatre Poèmes politiques, read at the Lycée du Palais-Royal and followed by several other poems, Text online
- 1791: Observations à MM. les auteurs de la Chronique de Paris sur l'état actuel de la Savoye, relativement à la Révolution de France, Text online

Revolutionary poetry

- 1793: Le Calendrier républicain, poème en deux chants, suivi de trente-six hymnes civiques pour les trente-six décades de l'année, Text online
- 1793: Nouveau chansonnier patriote, ou Recueil de chansons, vaudevilles, et pots-pourris patriotiques, par différents auteurs, dédié aux martyrs de la Révolution, avec leurs portraits, précédé de leurs Éloges, Text online
- 1793: Poème à la gloire de Marat, Text online
- 1793: La Mort de Basseville, ou la Conspiration de Pius VI dévoilée.

Napoleonic poetry

- 1800: La Paix avec l'Empereur, ou le Traité de Lunéville, poem, followed by Épître à Virgile sur la bataille de Marengo, 1800 Text online
- 1806: La Bataille d'Austerlitz, poem.

=== Theatre ===
Comedies

- 1776: La Manie des drames sombres, comedy in 3 acts, in verse, Fontainebleau, 29 October Text online
- 1777: Galathée, comedy in 1 act and in free verse, Versailles, Théâtre de la Cour, 21 September
- 1779: La Vengeance de Pluton, ou Suite des Muses rivales, in one act, in verse and in prose, Text online
- 1788: La Jeune épouse, comedy in 3 acts, in verse, Paris, Théâtre-Français, 4 July
- 1788: La Double épreuve, ou la Boiteuse et la borgne, comedy in 3 acts in prose, Paris, Théâtre des Variétés du Palais-Royal.
- 1789: L'Homme d'État imaginaire, comedy in 5 acts in verse.
- 1802: La Diligence de Lyon, comedy in 3 acts and in prose, Théâtre des Jeunes Élèves, 5 August
- 1804: Paméla mariée, ou le Triomphe des épouses, drama in 3 acts, in prose, with Benoît Pelletier-Volméranges, after Carlo Goldoni, Théâtre de la Porte-Saint-Martin, 30 March
- 1805: Nathan le Sage, ou le Juif philosophe, heroic comedy in 3 acts, in prose, ornamented with ballets and shows.
- 1806: L'Amour platonique, ou le Nez postiche, comedy in one act and in prose.
- 1806: Le Faux misanthrope, ou le Sous-lieutenant, comedy in 3 acts and in prose, imitated from German of Friedrich Ludwig Schröder.
- undated: L'Épreuve singulière ou la jambe de bois, comedy in three acts in prose.

Historical dramas

- 1785: Les Deux centenaires de Corneille, one-act play in verse, Text online
- 1788: La Mort de Molière, historical play in 4 acts in verse and show, Comédie-Française, 31 January
- 1794: La Baronne de Chantal, fondatrice de l'ordre de la Visitation, historical drama in 3 acts and in verse, followed by a letter by St Jérôme to a donna di Roma, Read online
- 1797: La Marquise de Pompadour, ou Germon et Juliette, comedy in 3 acts in prose, Théâtre Molière.
- 1806: Clavijo, ou la Jeunesse de Beaumarchais, drama in 3 acts and in prose.
- 1806: Ninon de Lenclos et le Prisonnier masqué, drama in 3 acts and in prose.

Tragedies

- 1797: Hippolyte, tragedy in 3 acts, imitated from Euripides, Théâtre du Marais, 27 February
- 1804: La Mort de Caton, tragedy in 5 acts, in verse.
- 1806: Roméo et Juliette, tragédie lyrique in 3 acts, preceded by a prologue, with Pierre-Louis Moline.

=== Collected works ===
- 1784: Opuscules poétiques.
- 1786: Théâtre moral, ou Pièces dramatiques nouvelles, 2 vol., Text online 2
- 1793: Œuvres choisies, Text online
- 1812: Œuvres dramatiques de C. Palmézeaux, ou Recueil des pièces de cet auteur qui ont été représentées sur différents théâtres, 4 vol., Text online 1 2 3 4

== Bibliography ==
- Jacques-Alphonse Mahul, Annuaire nécrologique, ou Supplément annuel et continuation de toutes les biographies ou dictionnaires historiques, 1e année, 1820, Paris, Baudoin, 1821, p. 56-64 .
- Charles Monselet, Les Oubliés et des Dédaignés, figures littéraires de la fin du XVIIIe siècle, Paris, Poulet-Malassis et de Broise, 1861, (p. 101-138.
- Michel Nicolas, Histoire littéraire de Nîmes et des localités voisines qui forment actuellement le département du Gard, Nîmes, Ballivet et Fabre, vol. III, 1854, (p. 59-64).
- Charles Dickens, All the Year Round, London, Chapman and Hall, vol. IV, n°83, 24 November 1860, (p. 164-165).
