= Canton of Roquemaure =

Coordinates: 44.05°N 4.78°E

The canton of Roquemaure is an administrative division of the Gard department, southern France. Its borders were modified at the French canton reorganisation which came into effect in March 2015. Its seat is in Roquemaure.

It consists of the following communes:

1. Codolet
2. Laudun-l'Ardoise
3. Lirac
4. Montfaucon
5. Roquemaure
6. Saint-Geniès-de-Comolas
7. Saint-Laurent-des-Arbres
8. Saint-Paul-les-Fonts
9. Saint-Victor-la-Coste
10. Sauveterre
11. Tavel
