= Saint-Paul-les-Fonts =

- Commune
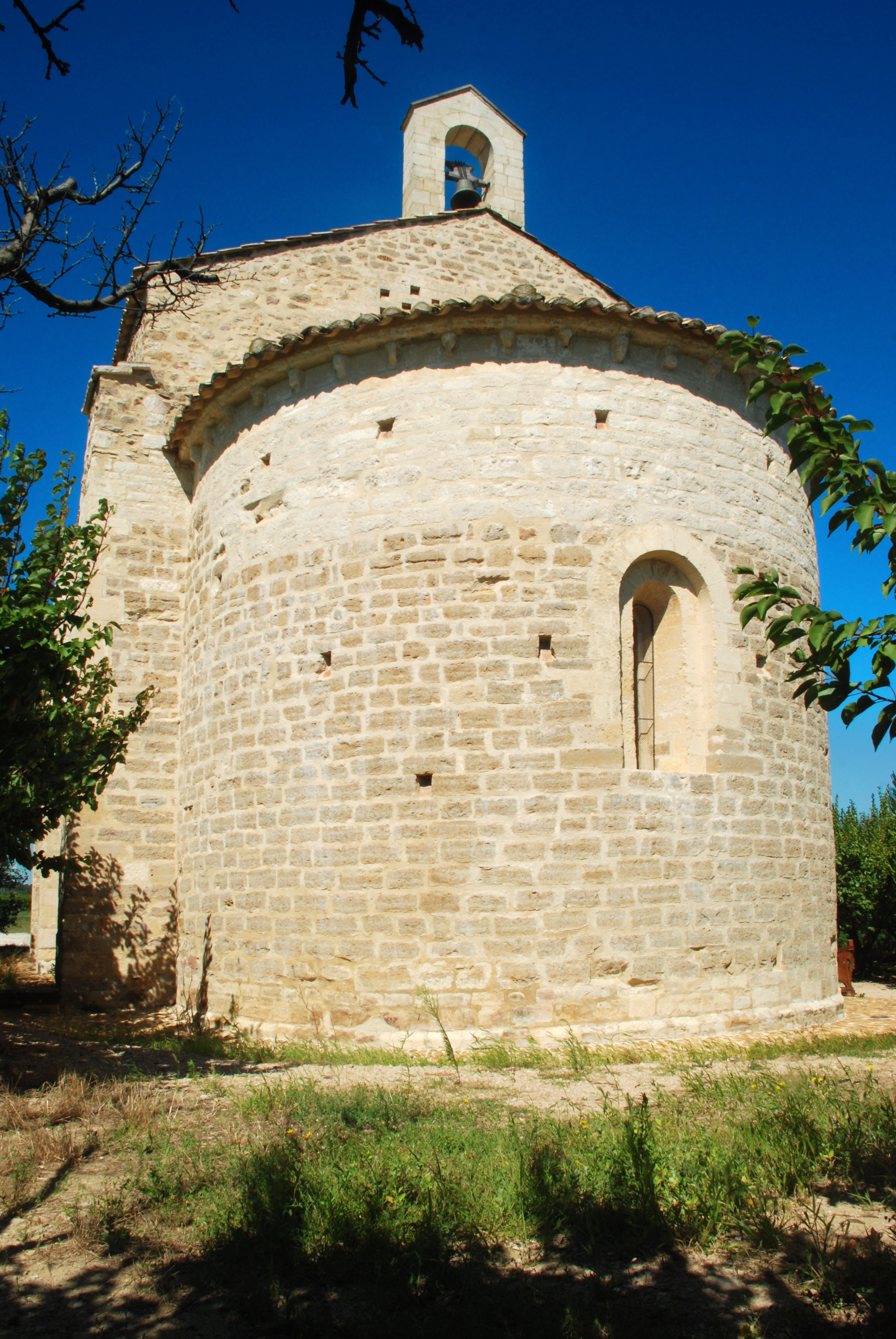
- The Chapel of Saint-André de Sévanes

- Coat of arms
- Location of Saint-Paul-les-Fonts
- Location within France Location within Occitanie
- Coordinates: 44°05′00″N 4°36′54″E
- Country: France
- Region: Occitania
- Department: Gard
- Arrondissement: Nîmes
- Canton: Roquemaure
- Intercommunality: CA Gard Rhodanien

Government
  - Mayor (2020–2026): André Lopez
- Area^{1}: 5.46 km^{2} (2.11 sq mi)
- Elevation: 65 m (213 ft)
- Highest elevation: 260 m (850 ft)
- Lowest elevation: 55 m (180 ft)
- Population (2023): 1,056
  - Density: 193/km^{2} (501/sq mi)
- Time zone: UTC+01:00 (CET)
  - Summer (DST): UTC+02:00 (CEST)
- INSEE/Postal code: 30355 /30330
- ^{1} French Land Register data, which excludes lakes, ponds, glaciers > 1 km^{2} (0.386 sq mi or 247 acres) and river estuaries.

Saint-Paul-les-Fonts (French pronunciation: [sɛ̃ pɔl le fɔ̃]; Provençal: Sent Pau dei Fònts) is a commune in the Gard department in southern France.

== Population ==
Historical population
Year	Pop.	±% p.a.
1968	324	—
1975	344	+0.86%
1982	403	+2.29%
1990	534	+3.58%
1999	610	+1.49%
2007	707	+1.86%
2012	952	+6.13%
2017	1,031	+1.61%
2023	1,056	+0.40%
Source: INSEE

== See also ==
- Communes of the Gard department
