= Codolet =

Commune in Occitanie, France

- Commune
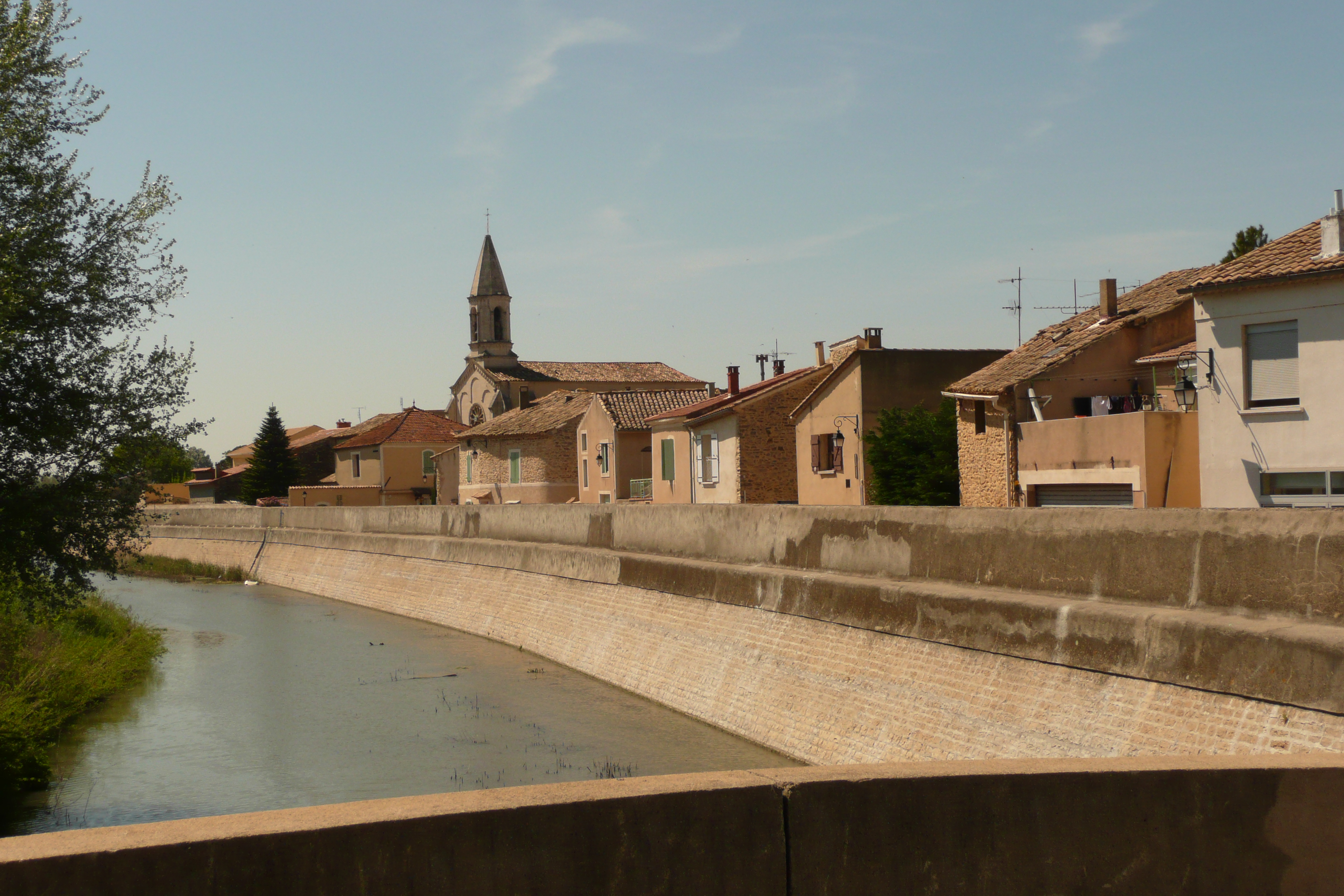
- A general view of Codolet

- Coat of arms
- Location of Codolet
- Location within France Location within Occitanie
- Coordinates: 44°07′37″N 4°42′10″E
- Country: France
- Region: Occitania
- Department: Gard
- Arrondissement: Nîmes
- Canton: Roquemaure
- Intercommunality: CA Gard Rhodanien

Government
  - Mayor (2020–2026): Sébastien Bayart
- Area^{1}: 5.17 km^{2} (2.00 sq mi)
- Elevation: 34 m (112 ft)
- Highest elevation: 50 m (160 ft)
- Lowest elevation: 27 m (89 ft)
- Population (2023): 597
  - Density: 115/km^{2} (299/sq mi)
- Time zone: UTC+01:00 (CET)
  - Summer (DST): UTC+02:00 (CEST)
- INSEE/Postal code: 30084 /30200
- ^{1} French Land Register data, which excludes lakes, ponds, glaciers > 1 km^{2} (0.386 sq mi or 247 acres) and river estuaries.

Codolet (French pronunciation: [kɔdɔlɛ]) is a commune in the Gard department in southern France.

== Population ==
Historical population
Year	Pop.	±% p.a.
1968	393	—
1975	386	−0.26%
1982	433	+1.65%
1990	458	+0.70%
1999	558	+2.22%
2007	682	+2.54%
2012	701	+0.55%
2017	660	−1.20%
2023	597	−1.66%
Source: INSEE

== See also ==
- Communes of the Gard department
