= Montfaucon, Gard =

Montfaucon
- Commune
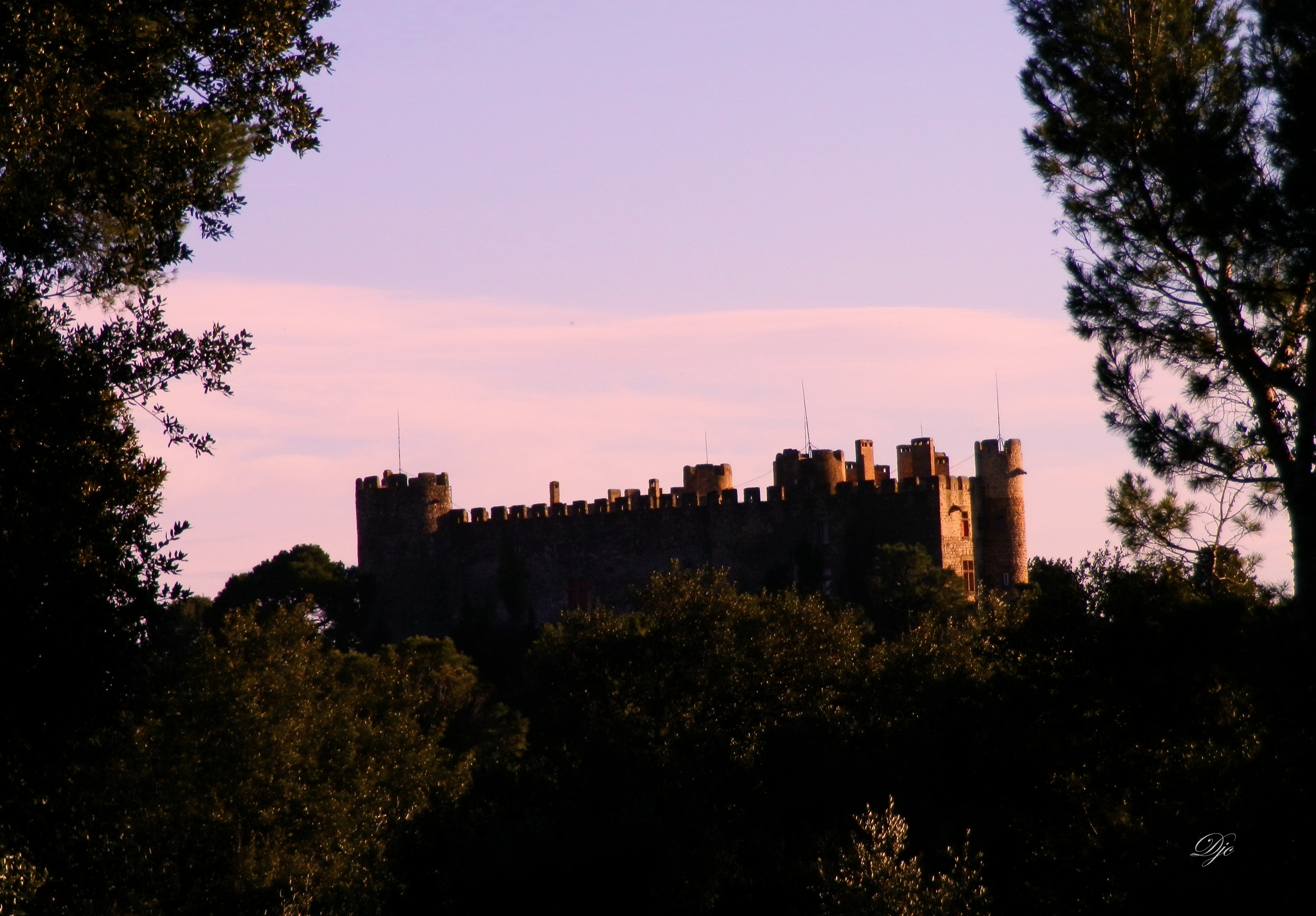
- The Chateau of Montfaucon

- Coat of arms
- Location of Montfaucon
- Location within France Location within Occitanie
- Coordinates: 44°04′31″N 4°45′19″E
- Country: France
- Region: Occitania
- Department: Gard
- Arrondissement: Nîmes
- Canton: Roquemaure
- Intercommunality: CA Gard Rhodanien

Government
  - Mayor (2020–2026): Olivier Robelet
- Area^{1}: 4.24 km^{2} (1.64 sq mi)
- Highest elevation: 68 m (223 ft)
- Lowest elevation: 23 m (75 ft)
- Population (2023): 1,540
  - Density: 363/km^{2} (941/sq mi)
- Time zone: UTC+01:00 (CET)
  - Summer (DST): UTC+02:00 (CEST)
- INSEE/Postal code: 30178 /30150
- ^{1} French Land Register data, which excludes lakes, ponds, glaciers > 1 km^{2} (0.386 sq mi or 247 acres) and river estuaries.

Montfaucon (French pronunciation: [mɔ̃fokɔ̃]) is a commune in the Gard department in southern France. The town lies on the right bank of the Rhône.

== Population ==
Historical population
Year	Pop.	±% p.a.
1968	658	—
1975	1,058	+7.02%
1982	1,153	+1.24%
1990	1,266	+1.18%
1999	1,329	+0.54%
2007	1,330	+0.01%
2012	1,443	+1.64%
2017	1,492	+0.67%
2023	1,540	+0.53%
Source: INSEE

== See also ==
- Communes of the Gard department
