= Laudun-l'Ardoise =

Laudun-l'Ardoise Laudun (Occitan)
- Commune
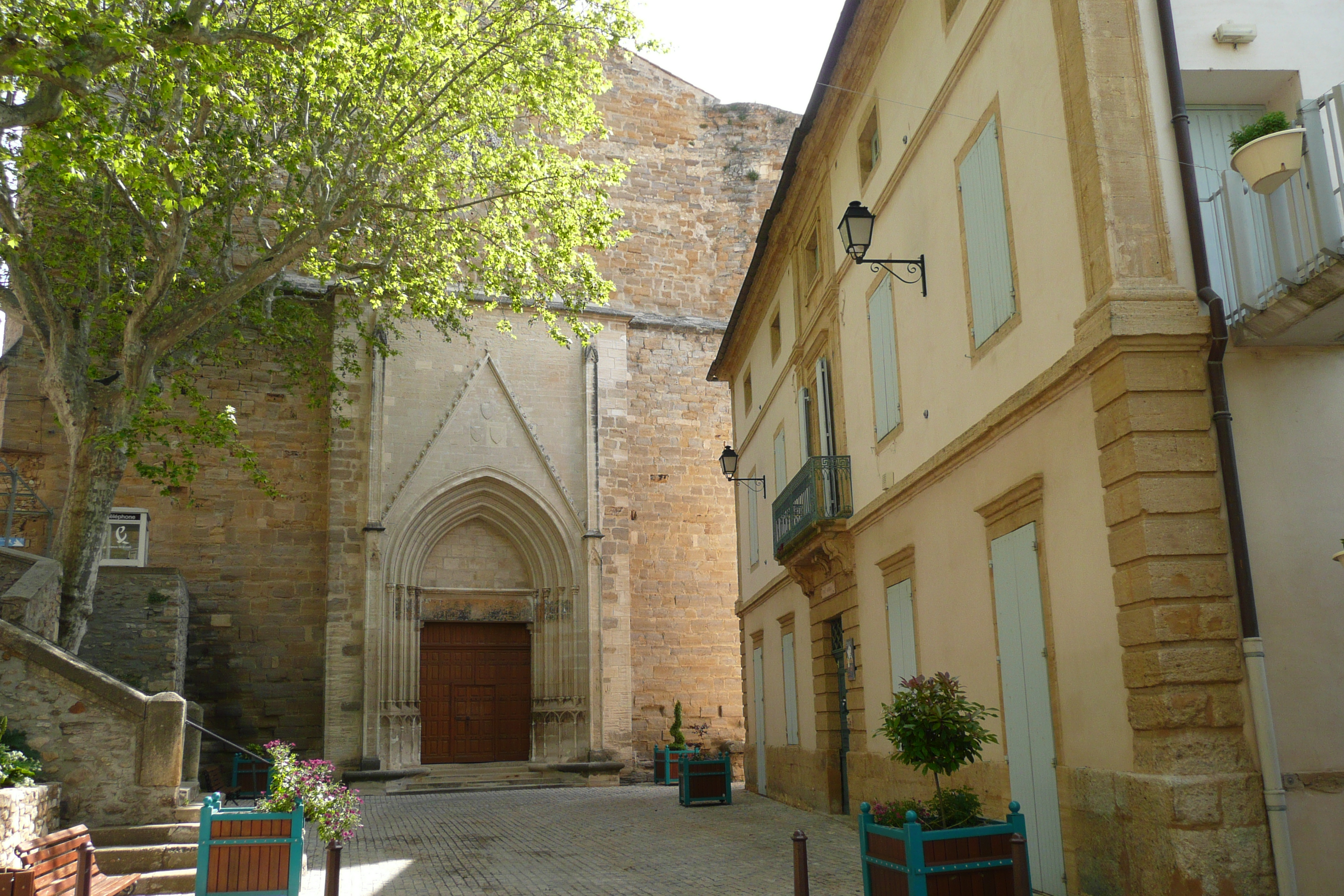
- The church of Laudun-l'Ardoise

- Coat of arms
- Location of Laudun-l'Ardoise
- Location within France Location within Occitanie
- Coordinates: 44°06′21″N 4°39′30″E
- Country: France
- Region: Occitania
- Department: Gard
- Arrondissement: Nîmes
- Canton: Roquemaure
- Intercommunality: CA Gard Rhodanien

Government
  - Mayor (2020–2026): Yves Cazorla
- Area^{1}: 34.19 km^{2} (13.20 sq mi)
- Elevation: 64 m (210 ft)
- Highest elevation: 274 m (899 ft)
- Lowest elevation: 26 m (85 ft)
- Population (2023): 6,835
  - Density: 199.9/km^{2} (517.8/sq mi)
- Time zone: UTC+01:00 (CET)
  - Summer (DST): UTC+02:00 (CEST)
- INSEE/Postal code: 30141 /30290
- ^{1} French Land Register data, which excludes lakes, ponds, glaciers > 1 km^{2} (0.386 sq mi or 247 acres) and river estuaries.

Laudun-l'Ardoise (French pronunciation: [lodœ̃ laʁdwaz]; Occitan: Laudun) is a commune in the Gard department in the Occitania region in Southern France. It is located on the departmental border with Vaucluse, which is also the regional border with Provence-Alpes-Côte d'Azur.

The commune name was officially Laudun until 1 February 2001.

== Demographics ==
Historical population
Year	Pop.	±% p.a.
1968	3,968	—
1975	3,664	−1.13%
1982	3,759	+0.37%
1990	4,408	+2.01%
1999	5,127	+1.69%
2007	5,388	+0.62%
2012	5,978	+2.10%
2017	6,292	+1.03%
2023	6,835	+1.39%
Source: INSEE

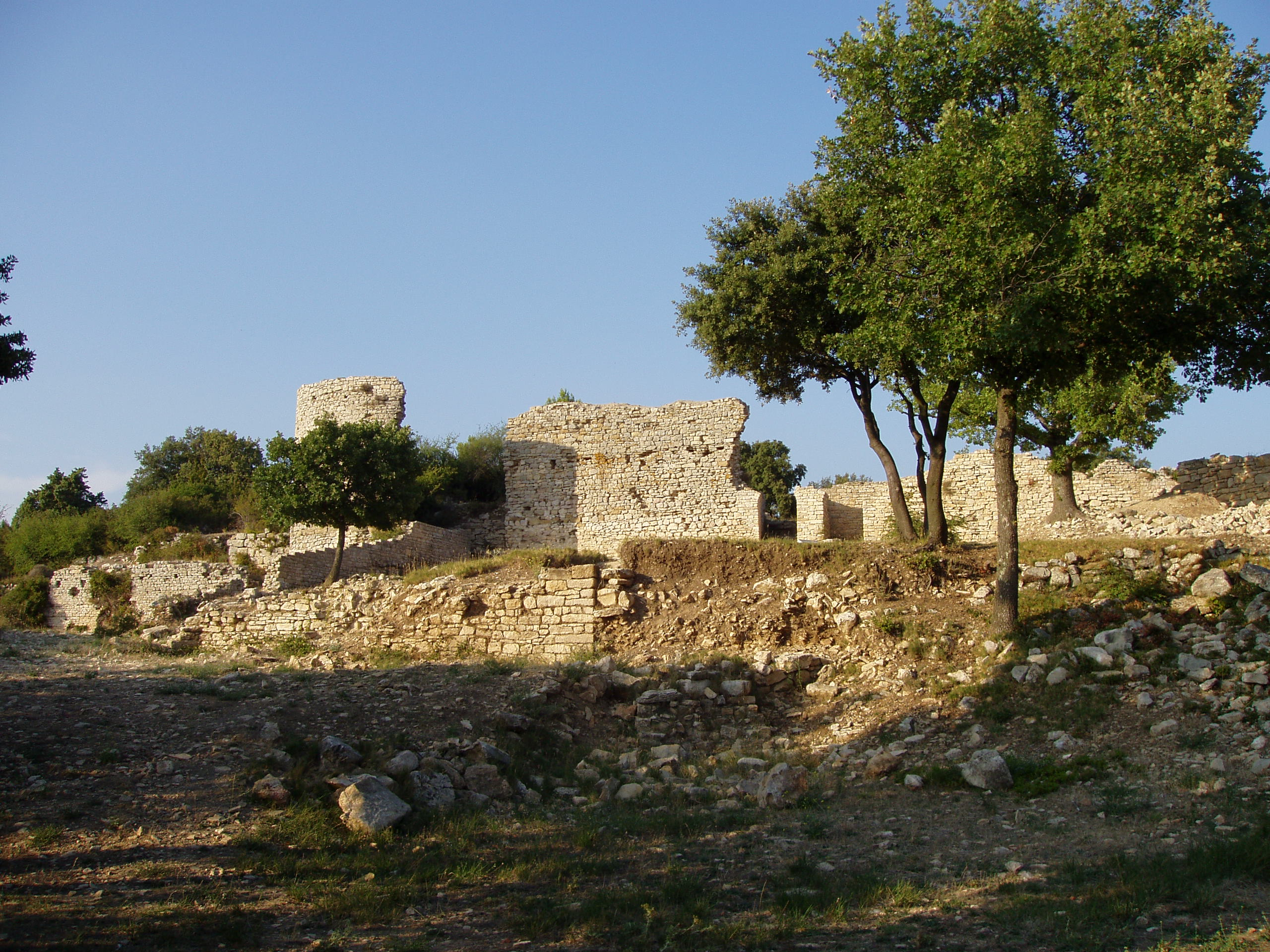
The "Camp de César", an ancient Roman site

== Wine ==
Laudun is one of the communes producing Côtes du Rhône Villages wines, red, rosé and white.

The Rhône is one of the main areas for French wines. Some have their own AOC (Appellation d'origine controlée) as Châteauneuf-du-Pape, Hermitage and Gigondas -others are selling their wines under the umbrella Côtes du Rhône AOC.

In 1953 the INAO (Institut National des Appellations d'Origine) chose 4 villages with a good reputation, but not considered quite good enough for their own AOC: Gigondas (has today its own AOC), Cairanne, Chusclan and Laudun (which include neighboring St. Victor la Coste and Tresques). These wine could add their name to the general AOC and sell the wine as "Côtes du Rhône Laudun", if they lived up to strict conditions as to yield per hectare (35 hl instead of 50), alcoholic strength (minimum 121,5% alcohol etc.

Later this group was extended with an increasing number of Villages -as Vacqueyras (1955, also later having AOC), Vinsobres (recently also an AOC) and recognized as AOC "Côtes du Rhône Villages". Today some 15-20 villages are allowed to add their own name to "Côtes du Rhône Villages", while another 30-40 can use the Côtes du Rhône Villages without their name added.

Close to the small village is the Camp de César plateau, where amphorae has been found, indicating an old Roman settlement, perhaps from César's days. Laudun was originally better known for white wines than reds -and in 1375 wine was sent to the papal cellars, then still in Avignon. King Louis XIII was in 1629 offered a barrel of Laudun, also white. Today, however, far more red than white wine is produced from Grenache and Syrah varietals, a wine with some body and fruit, but not among the most heavy, pleasant for drinking fairly young -not unlike the neighbor to the south -Lirac (AOC).

The main producer is the coop, Cave les Quatre Chemins. There are a few private cellars, inc. Pelaquié. Only part of the production is sold as Laudun Rhône Villages. The rest is sold as straight Côtes du Rhône or Vin de Pays (often named Gard after the department, Laudun is situated in). In total app. 1 million bottles are produced.

== See also ==
- Communes of the Gard department
- 1st Foreign Engineer Regiment
