= Saint-Victor-la-Coste =

Saint-Victor-la-Coste Sent Victor de la Còsta (Occitan)
- Commune
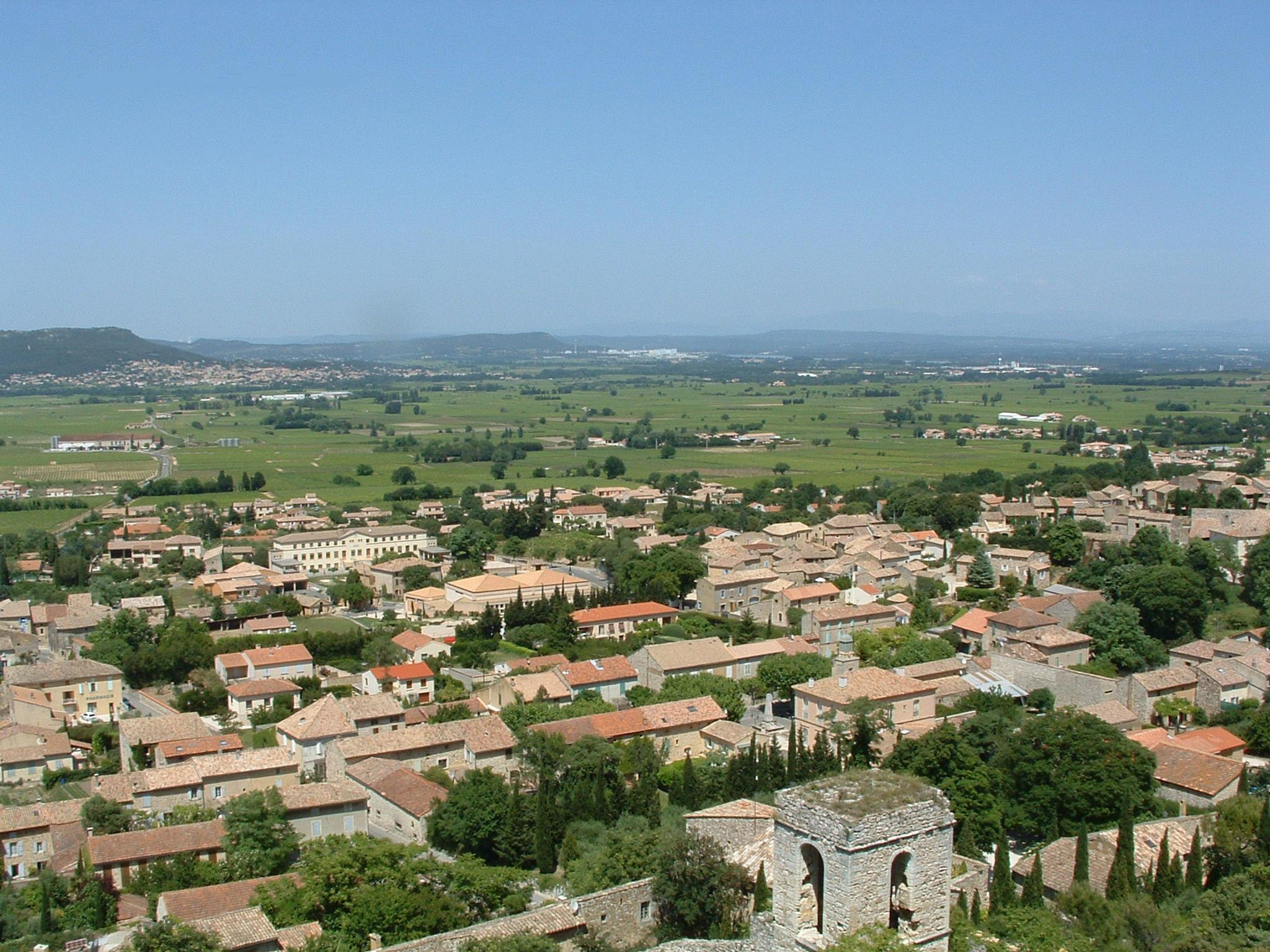
- A general view of Saint-Victor-la-Coste

- Coat of arms
- Location of Saint-Victor-la-Coste
- Location within France Location within Occitanie
- Coordinates: 44°03′46″N 4°38′35″E
- Country: France
- Region: Occitania
- Department: Gard
- Arrondissement: Nîmes
- Canton: Roquemaure
- Intercommunality: CA Gard Rhodanien

Government
  - Mayor (2020–2026): Véronique Herbé
- Area^{1}: 26.64 km^{2} (10.29 sq mi)
- Elevation: 138 m (453 ft)
- Highest elevation: 275 m (902 ft)
- Lowest elevation: 68 m (223 ft)
- Population (2023): 2,233
  - Density: 83.82/km^{2} (217.1/sq mi)
- Time zone: UTC+01:00 (CET)
  - Summer (DST): UTC+02:00 (CEST)
- INSEE/Postal code: 30302 /30290
- ^{1} French Land Register data, which excludes lakes, ponds, glaciers > 1 km^{2} (0.386 sq mi or 247 acres) and river estuaries.

Saint-Victor-la-Coste (French pronunciation: [sɛ̃ viktɔʁ la kɔst]; Provençal Occitan: Sent Victor de la Còsta) is a commune in the Gard department in the Occitania region in Southern France.

Built against a hill overlooking a plain covered with vineyards with the Rhône Valley in the distance, the town was once part of the medieval domain of the Sabran family, vassals to the Count of Toulouse.

== Demographics ==
Historical population
Year	Pop.	±% p.a.
1968	919	—
1975	951	+0.49%
1982	1,143	+2.66%
1990	1,285	+1.47%
1999	1,524	+1.91%
2007	1,821	+2.25%
2012	1,955	+1.43%
2017	2,073	+1.18%
2023	2,233	+1.25%
Source: INSEE

== Sights ==
Interesting sights include an 11th-century church and a 13th-century fort, known locally as Le Castellas, and which was restored by the French volunteer organization La Sabranenque.

== Wine ==
There are several wineries in the village producing Côtes du Rhone wines.

== See also ==
- Communes of the Gard department
