= Lirac =

- Commune
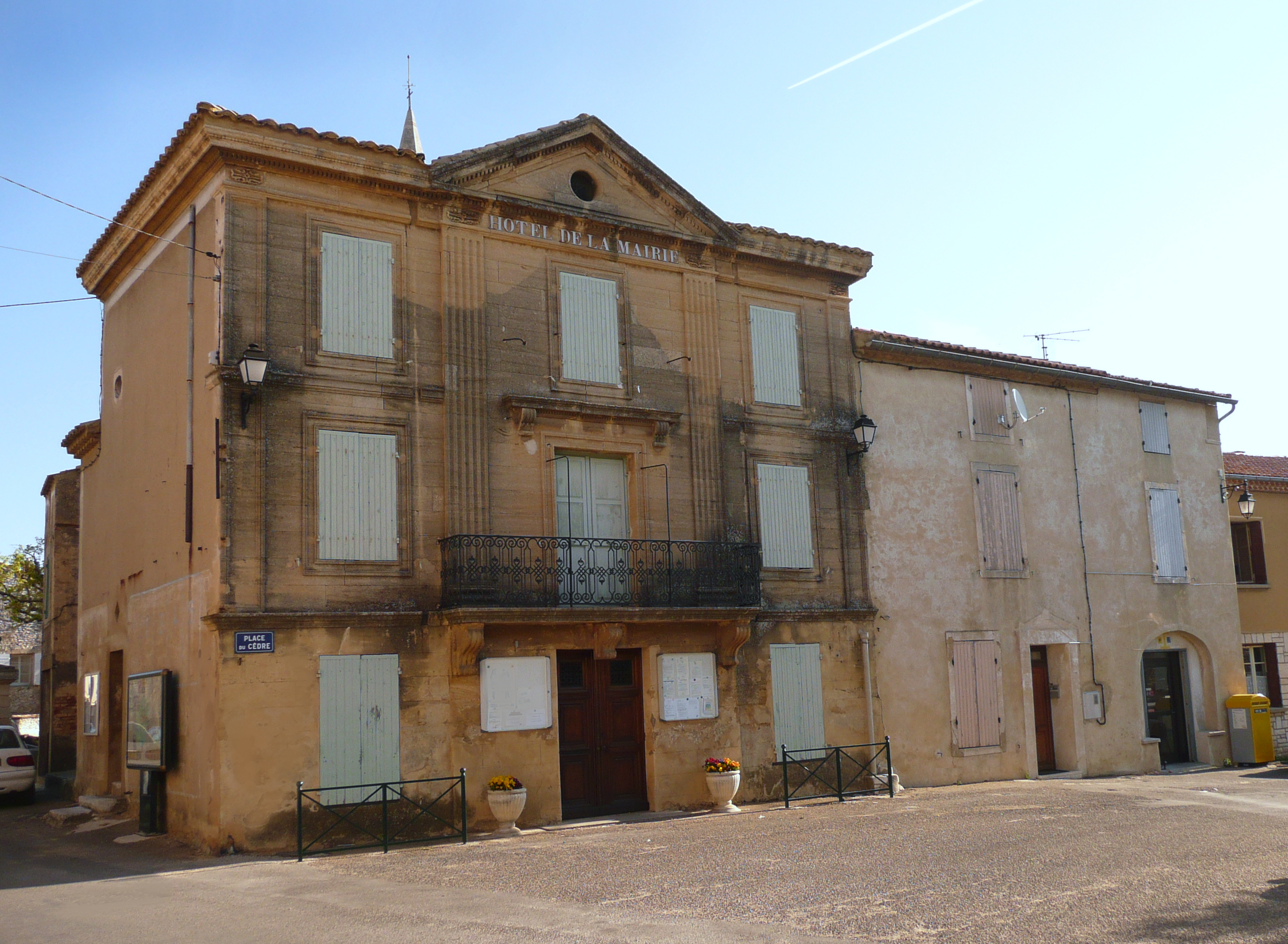
- Town hall

- Coat of arms
- Location of Lirac
- Location within France Location within Occitanie
- Coordinates: 44°02′12″N 4°41′27″E
- Country: France
- Region: Occitania
- Department: Gard
- Arrondissement: Nîmes
- Canton: Roquemaure
- Intercommunality: CA Gard Rhodanien

Government
  - Mayor (2020–2026): Cédric Clemente
- Area^{1}: 9.76 km^{2} (3.77 sq mi)
- Elevation: 83 m (272 ft)
- Highest elevation: 266 m (873 ft)
- Lowest elevation: 88 m (289 ft)
- Population (2023): 955
  - Density: 97.8/km^{2} (253/sq mi)
- Time zone: UTC+01:00 (CET)
  - Summer (DST): UTC+02:00 (CEST)
- INSEE/Postal code: 30149 /30126
- ^{1} French Land Register data, which excludes lakes, ponds, glaciers > 1 km^{2} (0.386 sq mi or 247 acres) and river estuaries.

Lirac (French pronunciation: [liʁak]) is a commune in the Gard department in southern France.

== Population ==
Historical population
| Year | Pop. | ±% p.a. |
|---|---|---|
| 1968 | 317 | — |
| 1975 | 329 | +0.53% |
| 1982 | 442 | +4.31% |
| 1990 | 631 | +4.55% |
| 1999 | 737 | +1.74% |
| 2007 | 827 | +1.45% |
| 2012 | 886 | +1.39% |
| 2017 | 904 | +0.40% |
| 2023 | 955 | +0.92% |
Source: INSEE

== See also ==
- Communes of the Gard department
- Lirac AOC
