= Saint-Geniès-de-Comolas =

- Commune
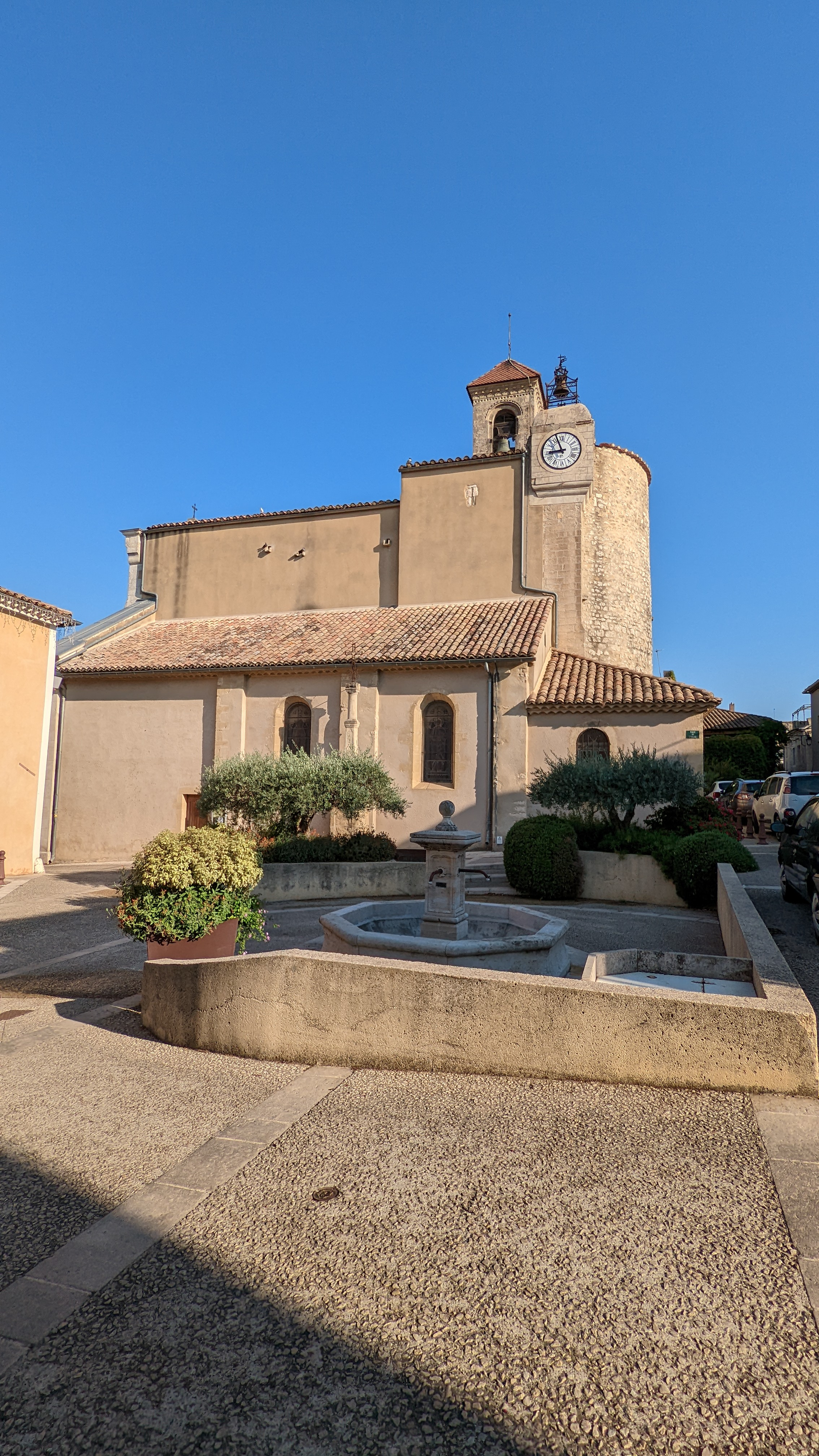
- Church, 2022

- Coat of arms
- Location of Saint-Geniès-de-Comolas
- Location within France Location within Occitanie
- Coordinates: 44°04′00″N 4°43′21″E
- Country: France
- Region: Occitania
- Department: Gard
- Arrondissement: Nîmes
- Canton: Roquemaure
- Intercommunality: CA Gard Rhodanien

Government
  - Mayor (2020–2026): Olivier Jouve
- Area^{1}: 8.26 km^{2} (3.19 sq mi)
- Elevation: 45 m (148 ft)
- Highest elevation: 176 m (577 ft)
- Lowest elevation: 25 m (82 ft)
- Population (2023): 2,014
  - Density: 244/km^{2} (632/sq mi)
- Time zone: UTC+01:00 (CET)
  - Summer (DST): UTC+02:00 (CEST)
- INSEE/Postal code: 30254 /30150
- ^{1} French Land Register data, which excludes lakes, ponds, glaciers > 1 km^{2} (0.386 sq mi or 247 acres) and river estuaries.

Saint-Geniès-de-Comolas (French pronunciation: [sɛ̃ ʒənjɛs də kɔmɔlas]; Occitan: Sent Genièis de Comolaç) is a commune in the Gard department in southern France.

== Population ==
Historical population
Year	Pop.	±% p.a.
1968	990	—
1975	1,040	+0.71%
1982	1,139	+1.31%
1990	1,413	+2.73%
1999	1,582	+1.26%
2007	1,839	+1.90%
2012	1,854	+0.16%
2017	1,969	+1.21%
2023	2,014	+0.38%
Source: INSEE

== See also ==
- Communes of the Gard department
