= Saint-Laurent-des-Arbres =

- Commune
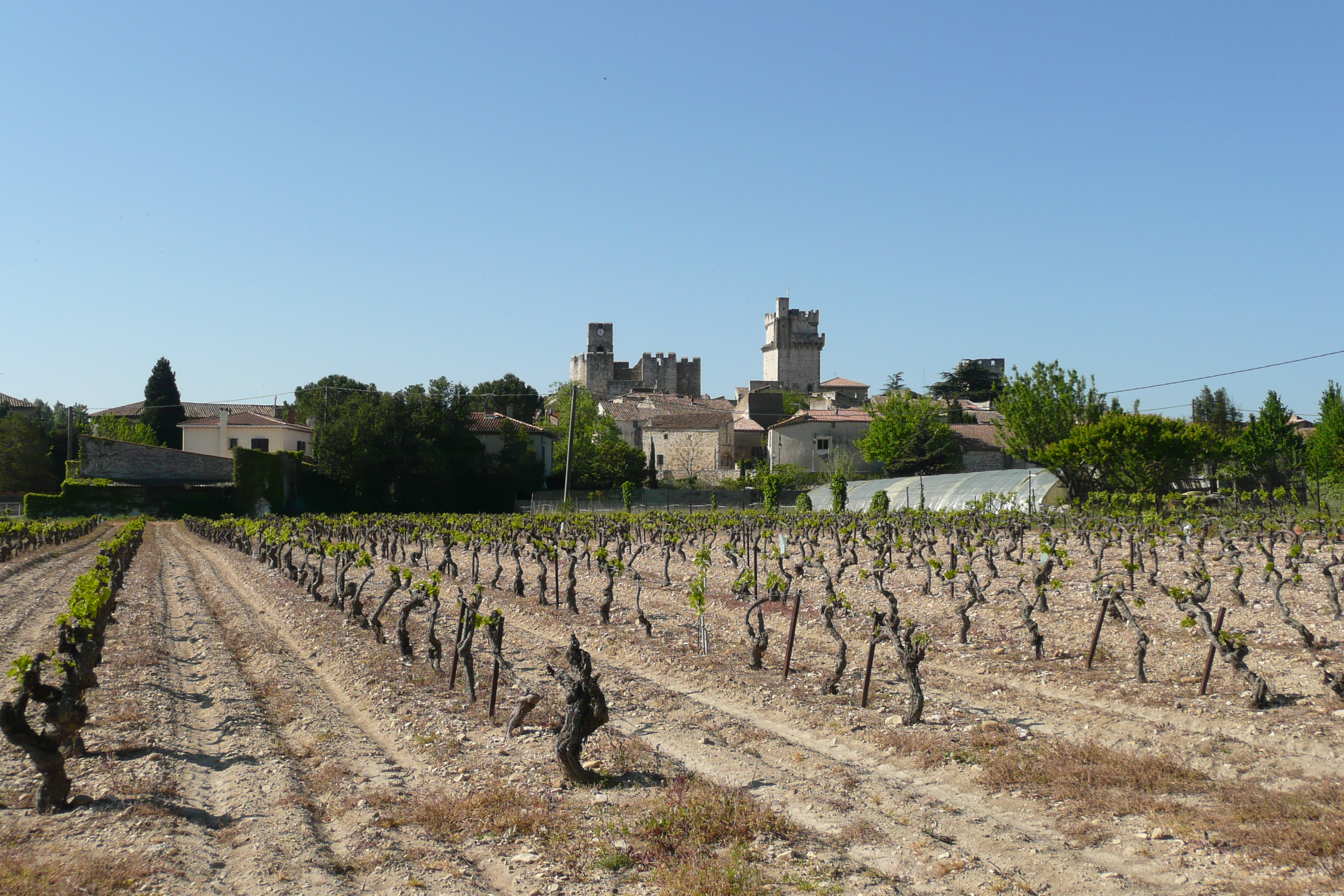
- A general view of Saint-Laurent-des-Arbres

- Coat of arms
- Location of Saint-Laurent-des-Arbres
- Location within France Location within Occitanie
- Coordinates: 44°03′19″N 4°42′02″E
- Country: France
- Region: Occitania
- Department: Gard
- Arrondissement: Nîmes
- Canton: Roquemaure
- Intercommunality: CA Gard Rhodanien

Government
  - Mayor (2021–2026): Sylvie Barrieu Vignal
- Area^{1}: 16.35 km^{2} (6.31 sq mi)
- Elevation: 60 m (200 ft)
- Highest elevation: 261 m (856 ft)
- Lowest elevation: 39 m (128 ft)
- Population (2023): 2,996
  - Density: 183.2/km^{2} (474.6/sq mi)
- Time zone: UTC+01:00 (CET)
  - Summer (DST): UTC+02:00 (CEST)
- INSEE/Postal code: 30278 /30126
- ^{1} French Land Register data, which excludes lakes, ponds, glaciers > 1 km^{2} (0.386 sq mi or 247 acres) and river estuaries.

Saint-Laurent-des-Arbres (French pronunciation: [sɛ̃ loʁɑ̃ de.z‿aʁbʁ]; Occitan: Sent Laurenç deis Aubres) is a commune in the Gard department in southern France.

== Population ==
Historical population
| Year | Pop. | ±% p.a. |
|---|---|---|
| 1968 | 1,847 | — |
| 1975 | 2,056 | +1.54% |
| 1982 | 1,403 | −5.31% |
| 1990 | 1,683 | +2.30% |
| 1999 | 1,743 | +0.39% |
| 2007 | 2,179 | +2.83% |
| 2012 | 2,662 | +4.09% |
| 2017 | 3,072 | +2.91% |
| 2023 | 2,996 | −0.42% |
Source: INSEE
