= Tavel, Gard =

Tavel
- Commune
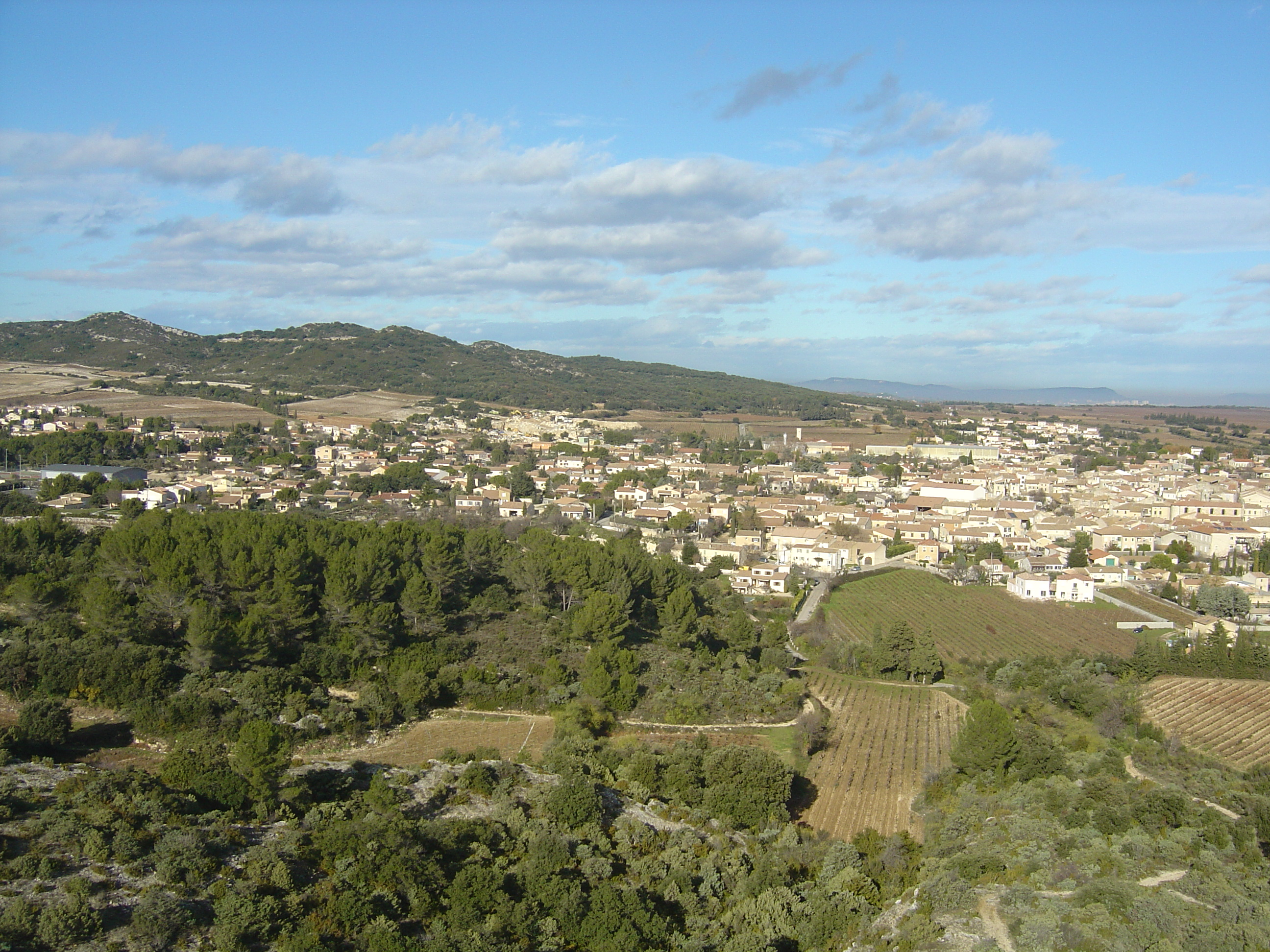
- A general view of Tavel

- Coat of arms
- Location of Tavel
- Location within France Location within Occitanie
- Coordinates: 44°00′43″N 4°42′02″E
- Country: France
- Region: Occitania
- Department: Gard
- Arrondissement: Nîmes
- Canton: Roquemaure
- Intercommunality: CA Gard Rhodanien

Government
  - Mayor (2020–2026): Claude Philip
- Area^{1}: 19.96 km^{2} (7.71 sq mi)
- Elevation: 86 m (282 ft)
- Highest elevation: 265 m (869 ft)
- Lowest elevation: 50 m (160 ft)
- Population (2023): 2,083
  - Density: 104.4/km^{2} (270.3/sq mi)
- Time zone: UTC+01:00 (CET)
  - Summer (DST): UTC+02:00 (CEST)
- INSEE/Postal code: 30326 /30126
- ^{1} French Land Register data, which excludes lakes, ponds, glaciers > 1 km^{2} (0.386 sq mi or 247 acres) and river estuaries.

Tavel (French pronunciation: [tavɛl]; Occitan: Tavèus) is a commune in the Gard department in southern France.

== Population ==
Historical population
| Year | Pop. | ±% p.a. |
|---|---|---|
| 1968 | 965 | — |
| 1975 | 1,161 | +2.68% |
| 1982 | 1,383 | +2.53% |
| 1990 | 1,439 | +0.50% |
| 1999 | 1,529 | +0.68% |
| 2007 | 1,706 | +1.38% |
| 2012 | 1,836 | +1.48% |
| 2017 | 1,979 | +1.51% |
| 2023 | 2,083 | +0.86% |
Source: INSEE

== See also ==
- Communes of the Gard department
- Tavel AOC
