= Aiguillon =

Aiguillon may refer to:

== Places ==
- Aiguillon (Cèze), a river in southern France, a tributary of the Cèze
- Aiguillon, Lot-et-Garonne, a commune in the Lot-et-Garonne department, France
  - Siege of Aiguillon, 1346
- Col de l'Aiguillon, a pass in the Jura Mountains, Switzerland
- L'Aiguillon, a commune in the Ariège department, France
- L'Aiguillon-la-Presqu'île, a commune in the Vendée department, France
- L'Aiguillon-sur-Mer, a former commune in the Vendée department, France
- L'Aiguillon-sur-Vie, a commune in the Vendée department, France

== Other uses ==
- Armand, duc d'Aiguillon (1761-1800), French military officer and politician
- Duchesse d'Aiguillon (1604-1675), French aristocrat
- Emmanuel-Armand de Richelieu, duc d'Aiguillon (1720-1788), French soldier and statesman
- 1918 Aiguillon, a main-belt asteroid
- EFW N-20 (EFW N-20 Aiguillon), a Swiss aircraft
