= Cyclone Xynthia =

2010 violent European windstorm

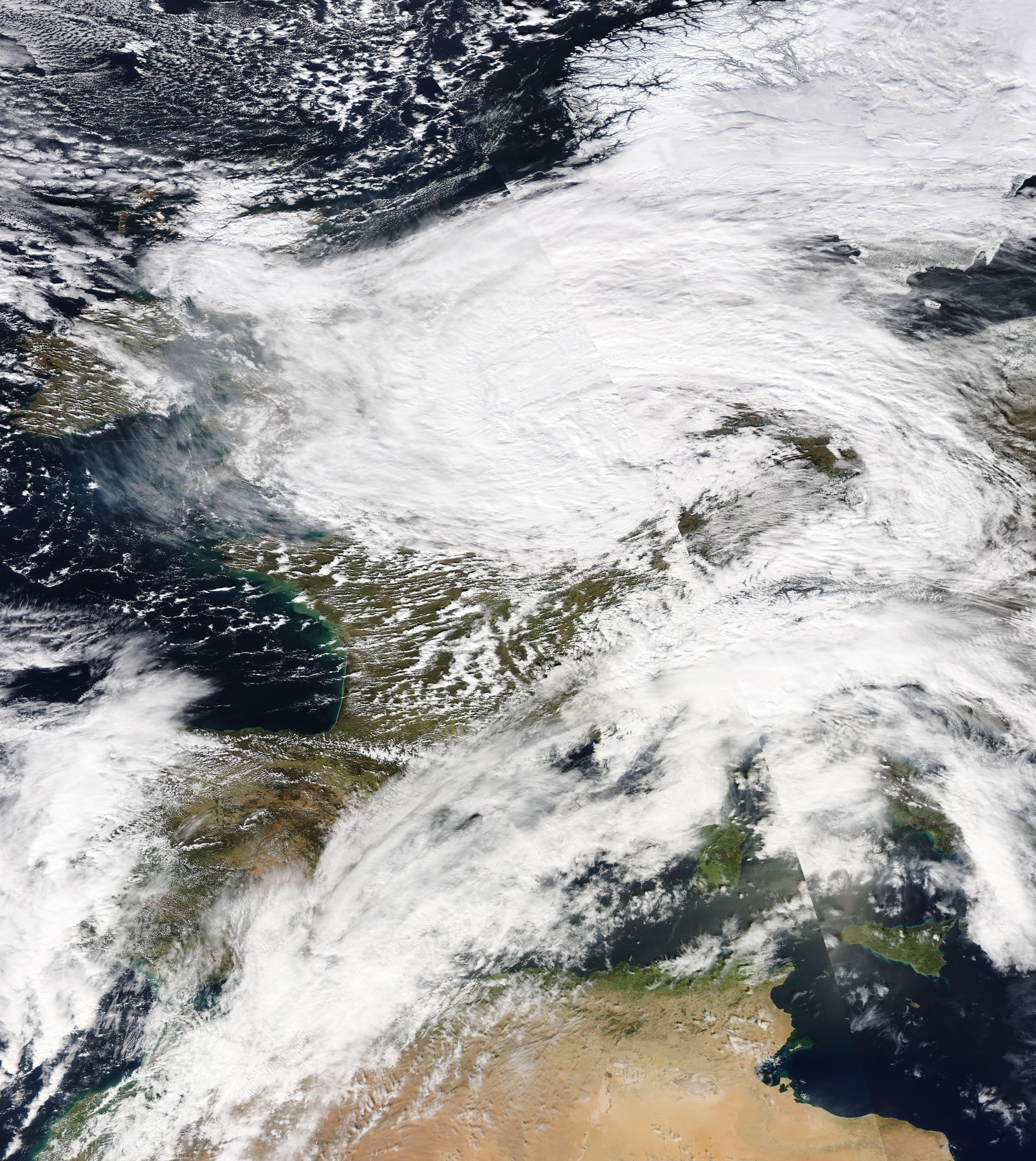
- Xynthia on 28 February

Meteorological history
- Formed: 26 February 2010
- Dissipated: 7 Μarch 2010

Extratropical cyclone
- Highest winds: 275 km/h (170 mph)
- Lowest pressure: 967 hPa (mbar); 28.56 inHg

Overall effects
- Fatalities: 63
- Missing: 12
- Damage: €1.3–3 billion (Note: Equivalent to 1.45 to 33.47 billion 2010 USD)
- Areas affected: Netherlands, Belgium, Denmark, France, England, Germany, Poland, Portugal, Spain and Sweden

Cyclone Xynthia was an exceptionally violent European windstorm which crossed Western Europe between 27 February and 1 March 2010. It reached a minimum pressure of 967 mb (28.6 inHg) on 27 February. In France—where it was described by the civil defence as the most violent since Lothar and Martin in December 1999—at least 51 people were killed, with 12 more said to be missing. A further six people were killed in Germany, three in Spain, one in Portugal, one in Belgium and another one in England. Most of the deaths in France occurred when a powerful storm surge topped by battering waves up to 7.5 m (25 ft) high, hitting at high tide, smashed through the sea wall off the coastal town of L'Aiguillon-sur-Mer. A mobile home park built close to the sea wall was particularly hard-hit. The sea wall was about two hundred years old, built in the time of Napoleon; critics said that situating a mobile home park so close to the sea wall showed poor coastal development practices. The storm cut power to over a million homes in France and a million customers in Portugal lost power.

== Effects ==
24-hour animation from 17:00, 27 February

One million homes were left without power in western France. In the Hautes-Pyrénées, falling trees damaged vehicles, the roofs of houses and barns were blown away, and rocks were falling onto the road. In the département of Vendée, cities like La Faute-sur-Mer, L'Aiguillon-sur-Mer, and La Tranche-sur-Mer were flooded with water levels reaching up to 1.5 metres (4 ft 11 in). Flooding affected parts of the Charente-Maritime département (Suburbs of La Rochelle, cities of Fouras, Marennes, Châtelaillon as well as Ré and Oléron Island) where high speed wind was registered (160 km/h [99 mph]).

Flooded railway tracks led to railway delays in France and the rail services in northern Spain were also severely affected. 70 flights from Paris-Charles de Gaulle Airport were cancelled by Air France.

The storm also caused damage in Portugal and Spain. The strongest wind gust recorded in Portugal was 166 km/h (103 mph) while in Spain a gust of 228 km/h (142 mph) was recorded. In France a 241 km/h (150 mph) wind gust was recorded at the Pic du Midi.

The storm may have been exacerbated by the spread of volcanic ash from the Soufrière Hills volcano. A cloud of ash from the volcano was dragged over the United Kingdom, forming a visible haze to the north-west of Xynthia on visible satellite imagery.

On 11 March 2010, catastrophe risk modeling firm EQECAT estimated wind losses for affected countries excluding Portugal and Spain as follows: Mean damage: €1.3 billion (approximately US$1.8 billion); Mean insured gross loss: €994 million (approximately US$1.4 billion). One year after the event, the insurance industry loss aggregator PERILS AG published its final loss estimate for Xynthia of €1.32bn, excluding the French indemnified losses.

== Response ==
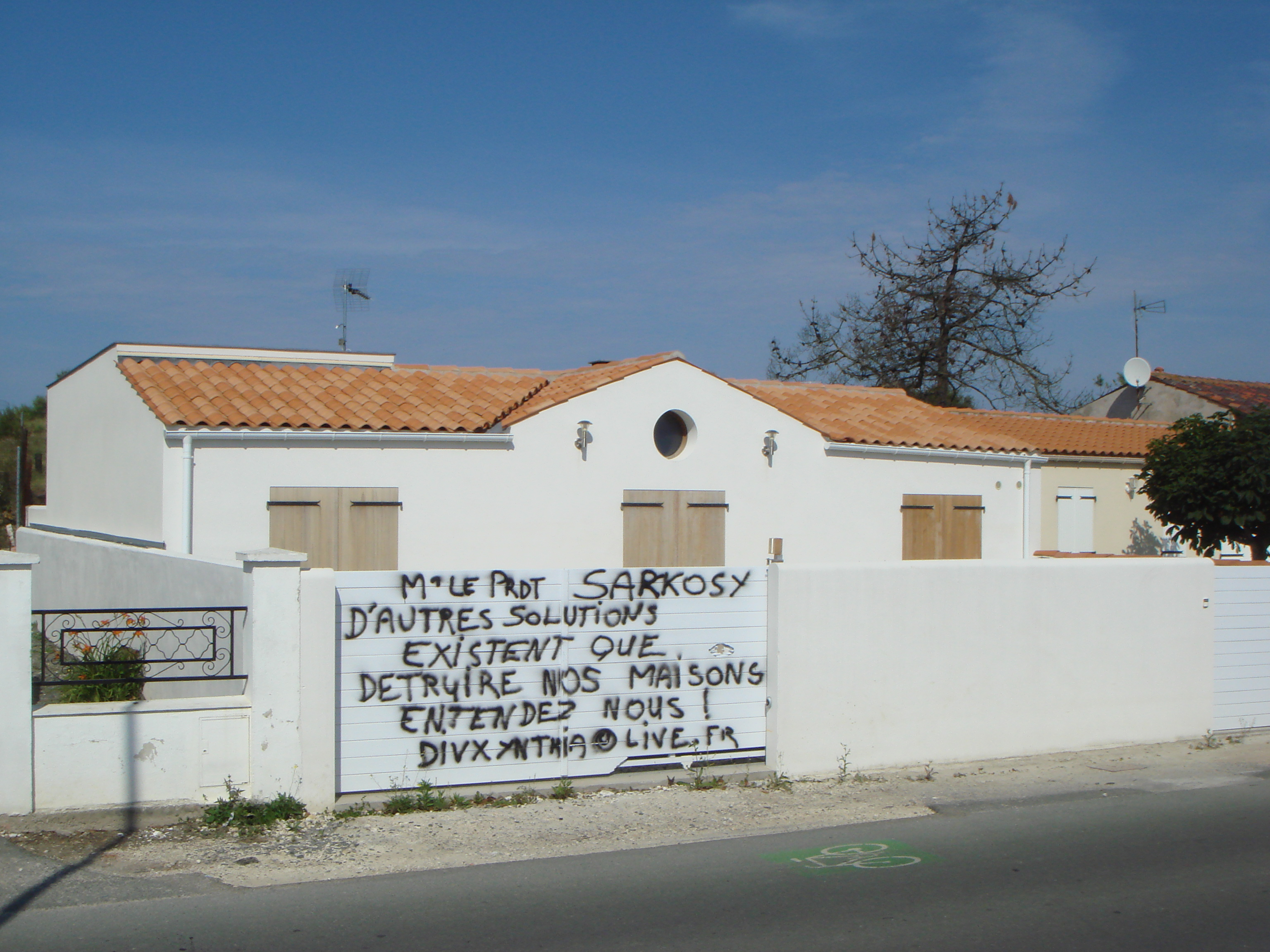
Protest against eviction after Xynthia, in Aytré, France

Météo-France issued its second highest warning (orange) for 27 February and early 28 February for Andorra, Ain, Ariège, Cantal, Finistère, Haute-Garonne, Gironde, Isère, Loire, Haute-Loire and Hautes-Pyrénées. It issued its highest warning level (red) for the Charente-Maritime, Vendée, Deux-Sèvres and Vienne.

Helicopters were sent to rescue people on their roofs following flooding in Charente-Maritime and Vendée, France. An emergency meeting was held on 28 February by French Prime Minister François Fillon following the effects in France.

The Portuguese Institute of Meteorology issued red warnings for the northern parts of the country for winds up to 150 km/h (93 mph), the rest of the country being with orange warnings for wind gusts up to 120 km/h (75 mph).

== Aftermath ==
The French Government declared the 2010 floods a "catastrophe". A historical study of coastal surges in France conducted after the storm indicated that there had been no previous coastal surge in France with such a high death toll.

In response to the coastal flooding brought by Xynthia, the French Government announced on 8 April 2010 that it had decided to destroy 1,510 houses in the affected areas of which 823 were in the Vendée and 595 were in Charente-Maritime. The government promised to fully compensate all home-owners, based on the value of the real estate prior to the storm, with the ministry of finance stating that they would pay €250,000 per house. In Vendée of the 823 homes designated by the French state to be destroyed, nearly 700 homeowners accepted the compensation terms by the state with demolition taking place in March 2011. In 2011 there remained 79 people who decided to fight the destruction of their homes via the legal system.

The French Government produced a document called Rapid inundation plan: coastal floods, flash floods and dike failures -"Plan submersions rapides: submersions marines, crues soudaines et ruptures de digues" in February 2011. This plan details the policy response brought about not only as a result of Xynthia in February 2010, but also severe June 2010 flash flooding in the Var Department in southern France that led to the deaths of 25 people.

== Observed wind gusts ==
Wind gusts recorded during Xynthia storm in France and Switzerland:

Country	Location	Speed			Comments
Country	Location	km/h	kn	mph	Comments
France	Pic du Midi de Bigorre	238	129	148	at 2,877 m (9,439 ft)
France	Puy de Dôme	209	113	130	at 1,415 m (4,642 ft)
France	Le Markstein	172	93	107	at 1,184 m (3,885 ft)
France	Scillé	161	87	100	plain maximum value for the storm
France	Île de Ré	160	86	99	
France	Paris (Tour Eiffel)	155	84	96	
France	Chouilly	148	80	92	
France	Luchon	147	79	91	
France	Celles-sur-Ource	144	78	89	
France	Saint Agnant, Pointe de Chassiron (Ile d'Oléron)	140	76	87	
France	Sainte-Gemme-la-Plaine, Brindas, Chastreix	138	75	86	
France	Royan	137	74	85	
France	Metz	136	73	85	
France	Châteauroux, Blois, La Rochelle	132	71	82	1999 records beaten for Châteauroux and Blois
France	La Roche-sur-Yon, Fontenay-le-Comte	131	71	81	
France	Cap-Ferret, Cap-Ferret	130	70	81	
France	Nangis	128	69	80	
France	Niort	127	69	79	
France	Roissy-en-France	126	68	78	
France	Bourges	125	67	78	
France	Poitiers	123	66	76	
France	Paris (Montsouris)	122	66	76	
France	Lyon	105	57	65	
Switzerland	Les Diablerets	148.3	80.1	92.1	at 2,966 m (9,731 ft)
Switzerland	Altdorf	147.2	79.5	91.5	at 449 m (1,473 ft) high
Switzerland	Evionnaz	124.9	67.4	77.6	at 480 m (1,570 ft) high
Switzerland	La Dole	121.1	65.4	75.2	at 1,677 m (5,502 ft)
Switzerland	Piz Corvatsch	119.9	64.7	74.5	at 3,451 m (11,322 ft)
Switzerland	Quarten, Moléson	115.6	62.4	71.8	respectively at 420 and 2,002 m (6,568 ft)
Switzerland	Oron-la-Ville	112	60	70	at 830 m (2,720 ft) high
Switzerland	Le Bouveret	108.7	58.7	67.5	at 375 m (1,230 ft) high
Switzerland	Aigle	105.1	56.7	65.3	at 381 m (1,250 ft) high
Switzerland	Glaris	101.9	55.0	63.3	at 1,478 m (4,849 ft)

== Highest wind gust per country ==
Country	Gust	Location
Austria	166 km/h	Zugspitze
Belgium	136 km/h	Stavelot
Czechia	165 km/h	Plešivec
Denmark	146 km/h	Nordborg
France	238 km/h	Pic du Midi de Bigorre
Germany	180 km/h	Brocken
Italy	172 km/h	Adamello
Liechtenstein	155 km/h	Eschen
Luxembourg	144 km/h	Wincrange
Netherlands	116 km/h	Vaalserberg
Poland	176 km/h	Śnieżka
Sweden	145 km/h	Karlskrona
Switzerland	164 km/h	Säntis
United Kingdom	119 km/h	Bruray
