= List of shipwrecks in January 1861 =

The list of shipwrecks in January 1861 includes ships sunk, foundered, wrecked, grounded, or otherwise lost during January 1861.

== 1 January ==
List of shipwrecks: 1 January 1861
| Ship | State | Description |
|---|---|---|
| Aire | United Kingdom | The ship was abandoned in the English Channel 20 nautical miles (37 km) south of the Eddystone Lighthouse. Her crew were rescued by Bostonian (United States). Aire was on a voyage from Woolwich Dockyard, Kent to Malta. |
| Amoor | United Kingdom | The full-rigged ship was lost between Jersey, Channel Islands and Portbail, Manche, France. She was on a voyage from Manila, Spanish East Indies to London. |
| Ardville | United Kingdom | The ship was driven ashore at Ambleteuse, Pas-de-Calais, France. Her 25 crew were rescued. She was on a voyage from Macao, China to London. Ardville was later refloated and towed in to Dover, Kent. |
| Caroline | United States | The 112-ton sternwheel paddle steamer was sunk by ice on the Wabash River at Terre Haute, Indiana. |
| Ceres | Norway | The brig was driven ashore in Bridgwater Bay. She was on a voyage from Rouen, Seine-Inférieure, France to Cardiff, Glamorgan, United Kingdom. She was refloated on 9 January and taken in tow for Cardiff. |
| Cleadon | United Kingdom | The brig ran aground on the Pakefield Flat, in the North Sea off the coast of Suffolk. She was refloated with assistance from the tug Imperial (United Kingdom) and towed in to Lowestoft, Suffolk. |
| Cordelia | United Kingdom | The brig was driven ashore in Loch Ryan. She was on a voyage from Demerara, British Guiana to Liverpool, Lancashire. She was refloated the next day and taken in to Cairnryan, Wigtownshire. |
| Crima | Kingdom of Hanover | The schooner was driven ashore and wrecked at Beadnell, Northumberland with the loss of all hands. |
| Duguay Trouin | France | The barque ran aground on the Goodwin Sands, Kent, United Kingdom. Her crew took to a boat, and reached the North Sand Head Lightship ( Trinity House). Duguay Trouin was on a voyage from Bordeaux, Gironde to Antwerp, Belgium. She was refloated with assistance from the Walmer Lifeboat. |
| Eidsvold | Norway | The ship was driven ashore at Burnham-on-Sea, Somerset United Kingdom. She was later refloated and found to be severely damaged. |
| Guttenberg | Hamburg | The full-rigged ship was wrecked on the Goodwin Sands. Six of her 32 crew survived. She was on a voyage from New York, United States to Hamburg. |
| Henrietta Alberdina | Netherlands | The ship was driven ashore and wrecked near Ambleteuse. She was on a voyage from Port Elizabeth, Cape Colony to Amsterdam, North Holland, Netherlands. |
| Isabella | United States | The schooner was abandoned in the Atlantic Ocean. Her crew were rescued by North American (United Kingdom). Isabella was on a voyage from Saint Andrew, Barbados to Baltimore, Maryland. |
| Johannes | Kingdom of Hanover | The ship was driven ashore at Bremen. |
| John Wesley | (United Kingdom of Great Britain and Ireland) Guernsey | The brigantine was driven ashore and wrecked between Compton Bay and Freshwater, Isle of Wight. Her crew were rescued by the Brooke Lifeboat. She was on a voyage from Alderney to Guernsey, Channel Islands. |
| Lelia | France | The ship collided with Wilhelm Tersmeden (Flag unknown) and sank in the English Channel off Dungeness, Kent. Her crew were rescued by Wilhelm Tersmeden. Lelia was on a voyage from Bordeaux to Boulogne, Pas-de-Calais. |
| Lively Nelly, or Lovely Nelly | United Kingdom | The collier, a brig, was driven ashore and wrecked at Whitley, County Durham with the loss of three of her seven crew. Survivors were rescued by the Cullercoats Lifeboat Percy (United Kingdom). She was on a voyage from Sunderland, County Durham to London. |
| London | United Kingdom | The brig foundered off St. Abbs Head, Berwickshire. Her crew were rescued by the schooner Commerce (United Kingdom). London was on a voyage from South Shields, County Durham to a French port. |
| Lord Hawkesbury | United Kingdom | The ship was driven ashore at Sunderland, County Durham. Her crew were rescued by the Sunderland Lifeboat. She was on a voyage from Whitstable, Kent to Sunderland, or Hartlepool, County Durham to London. |
| Maid of the Seas | United Kingdom | The ship was driven ashore at Falmouth, Cornwall. She was on a voyage from London to Kurrachee, India. |
| Maria Hardy | United Kingdom | The brig was driven ashore and wrecked at Flamborough Head, Yorkshire. She was on a voyage from Dieppe, Seine-Inférieure, France to Scarborough, Yorkshire. Maria Hardy was refloated on 12 January and taken in to Bridlington, Yorkshire. |
| Miss Nightingale | United Kingdom | The schooner foundered in the North Sea off the coast of Norfolk. She was on a voyage from São Miguel Island, Azores to Chester, Cheshire. |
| Nugget | United Kingdom | The schooner was driven ashore and wrecked at Padstow, Cornwall. Her crew were rescued by the Padstow Lifeboat. She was on a voyage from St. Ives, Cornwall to Llanelly, Glamorgan. |
| Oak | United Kingdom | The ship was driven ashore at Sunderland, County Durham. Her crew were rescued. She was on a voyage from Portsmouth, Hampshire to Sunderland. |
| Orion | United Kingdom | The brig foundered off South Shields with the loss of all hands. |
| Queen | United Kingdom | The Mersey Flat collided with a steamship and sank in the Irish Sea. Her crew were rescued by the tug Enterprise (United Kingdom). Queen was on a voyage from Liverpool to Holyhead, Anglesey. |
| Salus | United Kingdom | The snow was driven ashore and wrecked at Pembrey, Carmarthenshire with the loss of eight or ten of her twelve crew. She was on a voyage from Cardiff, Glamorgan to London. |
| San Basilio | Ottoman Empire | The brig was wrecked at Varna. Her crew were rescued. |
| Saucy Nancy | United Kingdom | The brig foundered off South Shields with the loss of one of her six crew. Survivors were rescued by the Cullercoats Lifeboat Percy (United Kingdom). |
| Sylvanus | United Kingdom | The ship was driven ashore at Burnham-on-Sea. |
| Thames | United Kingdom | The brig was driven ashore at Southsea, Hampshire. She was on a voyage from Portsmouth to South Shields. |
| Timbuctoo | United Kingdom | The brig was driven ashore and wrecked at Ross, Northumberland. Her crew survived. She was on a voyage from South Shields to London. |
| William | United Kingdom | The ship was driven ashore at Burnham-on-Sea. |
| Unnamed | Board of Customs | The cutter struck the pier at Great Yarmouth and was severely damaged. She was taken in to port, where she sank. |

== 2 January ==
List of shipwrecks: 2 January 1861
| Ship | State | Description |
|---|---|---|
| Agathi Tiebi | Flag unknown | The ship was driven ashore at Trieste. |
| Bloomer | United Kingdom | The brigantine departed from Cork for Saint John's, Newfoundland, British North America. No further trace, presumed foundered with the loss of all hands. |
| Coquetdale | United Kingdom | The barque was wrecked on the Kentish Knock. Her crew survived. She was on a voyage for Alexandria, Egypt to Sunderland, County Durham. |
| Elizabeth And Cicely | (United Kingdom of Great Britain and Ireland) Guernsey | The ship was driven ashore at New Romney, Kent. She was on a voyage from Guernsey to London. She was refloated on 7 January and taken in to Dover, Kent. |
| Mauruca | Ottoman Empire | The brig was driven ashore and sank at Souda, Crete. She was on a voyage from Rettino to Canea. |
| Queen Victoria | United Kingdom | The steamship ran aground in Plymouth Sound. She was on a voyage from Plymouth to Keyham, Devon. She was declared a total loss. Queen Victoria was refloated on 28 January and beached at Cremyll, Cornwall. She was refloated on 13 March and taken in to Plymouth |
| Union | France | The brig was abandoned 24 nautical miles (44 km) south south west of the Longships Lighthouse, Cornwall, United Kingdom. Her crew were rescued by Leonie Celine (France). Union was on a voyage from Swansea, Glamorgan, United Kingdom to Bordeaux, Gironde. |
| Vedra | United Kingdom | The steamship departed from Sunderland for Copenhagen, Denmark. No further trace, presumed foundered with the loss of all 21 crew. |
| Washington | United States | The ship was driven ashore in Mobile Bay. She was on a voyage from Mobile, Alabama to Liverpool, Lancashire, United Kingdom. She was refloated on 7 January. |
| Wilhelmine Marie | Hamburg | The barque sank in Puerto Inglese Bay, Juan Fernández Islands, Chile. Her twelve crew survived. She was on a voyage from Mejillones, Chile to a European port. |

== 3 January ==
List of shipwrecks: 3 January 1861
| Ship | State | Description |
|---|---|---|
| Bostonian | United States | The full-rigged ship was wrecked on the Honois Rocks, 1.5 nautical miles (2.8 km) west of Guernsey, Channel Islands with the loss of six of the 23 people on board, including two survivors of Aire (United Kingdom). Bostonian was on a voyage from New York to London. |
| Gleaner | United Kingdom | The schooner capsized and sank at Mazagan, Morocco with the loss of a crew member. Her captain was rescued by Trinidad (United Kingdom). |
| Hamelin | France | The schooner was driven ashore and wrecked 10 nautical miles (19 km) south of Barnegat, New Jersey, United States with the loss of all but one of her crew. |
| Hebe | (United Kingdom of Great Britain and Ireland) New South Wales | The brig ran aground on the Sow and Pigs Reef. She was on a voyage from Hokianga, New Zealand to Sydney. She was refloated and taken in to Sydney. |
| Idas | United Kingdom | The ship was abandoned in the Atlantic Ocean (43°06′N 38°49′W). Her crew were rescued by Mercury (United States). |
| Jacques Langlois | United Kingdom | The ship ran ashore at Saint-Nazaire, Loire-Inférieure. She was later refloated. |
| Lord George Bentinck | United Kingdom | The ship was driven ashore and wrecked at Port Natal, Cape Colony. Her crew were rescued. |
| Mary Jane | United Kingdom | The ship ran aground on the Scarweather Sands in the Bristol Channel and was abandoned. She was refloated the next day and taken in to Porthcawl, Glamorgan, Wales by the Porthcawl Lifeboat. She was repaired and returned to service. |
| Mountain Maid | United Kingdom | The barque was wrecked in the Black Sea with the loss of two of her eleven crew. She was on a voyage from Odesa to a British port. |
| New Angelica | Greece | The brig was wrecked on the North Cachopa Rocks, in the coast of Portugal. Her crew were rescued. She was on a voyage from Cardiff, Glamorga to Venice, Kingdom of Lombardy–Venetia. |
| Queen | United Kingdom | The ship sank off Liverpool, Lancashire. Her crew were rescued. She was on a voyage from Liverpool to Holyhead, Anglesey. |
| Sappemeer | Netherlands | The full-rigged ship foundered in the Atlantic Ocean. Her crew were rescued by Philosopher (United Kingdom). Sappemeer was on a voyage from Antwerp, Belgium to Havana, Cuba. |
| Uncle Sam | United Kingdom | The barque was run down and sunk 60 nautical miles (110 km) east of the Hole in the Wall. Her crew survived. She was on a voyage from Charleston, South Carolina to Bordeaux, Gironde, France. |
| Virginia | Malta | The ship was wrecked at "Vallona". Her seven crew were rescued. |

== 4 January ==
List of shipwrecks: 4 January 1861
| Ship | State | Description |
|---|---|---|
| Batavia | Netherlands | The full-rigged ship ran aground on the Kentish Knock. She was on a voyage from Batavia, Netherlands East Indies to Amsterdam, North Holland. She was refloated and taken in tow for London, United Kingdom. |
| Boston | United Kingdom | The Yorkshire Billyboy was severely damaged by fire at Blaydon-on-Tyne, County Durham. |
| Falcon | United Kingdom | The ship ran aground on the Newcombe Sand, in the North Sea off the coast of Suffolk. She was on a voyage from Lowestoft, Suffolk to Newcastle upon Tyne, Northumberland. She was refloated and resumed her voyage. |
| Frontier City | United States | The 144-ton sternwheel paddle steamer struck a snag and sank in the Mississippi River at Napoleon, Arkansas, at the head of Smith's Cut-off near the mouth of the Arkansas River. |
| Hedwig | Sweden | The schooner was wrecked at Porto, Portugal. Her crew were rescued. She was on a voyage from Stockholm to Porto. |
| Henry | United Kingdom | The ship was driven ashore at Hartlepool, County Durham. |
| Lord George Bentinck | United Kingdom | The ship was wrecked at Durban, Cape Colony. |
| Retreat | United Kingdom | The brig struck a sunken rock off Laggan, Islay, Inner Hebrides. She was on a voyage from Ardrossan, Ayrshire to New York, United States. She was consequently beached in Loch Indaal. Retreat was refloated on 11 January and taken in to Troon, Ayrshire. |
| Sandade | Portugal | The full-rigged ship ran onto rocks in the Douro. |
| Templar | United Kingdom | The schooner collided with the sloop Collingwood (United Kingdom) and then ran aground off the coast of Lincolnshire. Shew as on a voyage from Newcastle upon Tyne to Havre de Grâce, Seine-Inférieure, France. She was refloated and taken in to Grimsby, Lincolnshire in a leaky condition. |
| Warwick | United States | The brig was driven ashore and severely damaged at Montevideo, Uruguay. She was on a voyage from Cádiz, Spain to Montevideo. She was consequently condemned. |
| Zenobia | Sweden | The barque was driven ashore and wrecked at Kenfig, Glamorgan, United Kingdom. |

== 5 January ==
List of shipwrecks: 5 January 1861
| Ship | State | Description |
|---|---|---|
| Acorn | United Kingdom | The brig was driven ashore at Harwich, Essex. She was on a voyage from Hartlepool, County Durham to London. She was refloated on 7 January and taken in to Harwich. |
| Bruiser | United Kingdom | The steamship ran aground off Brielle, South Holland, Netherlands. She was later refloated and taken in to the River Thames. |
| Conquest | United Kingdom | The ship was driven ashore at Moriches, New York, United States. She was on a voyage from Saint Domingo to New York City, United States. |
| David Brown | United Kingdom | The ship sprang a leak and foundered in the Atlantic Ocean. All 48 people on board took to two boats; twenty of them in one boat were rescued by the barque Sea Wave (United Kingdom). Twenty-eight people in the other boat were reported missing. David Brown was on a voyage from San Francisco, California, United States to Liverpool, Lancashire. |
| Fortune | United States | The barque was driven ashore and wrecked at Maggara, Algeria. She was on a voyage from Agrigento, Sicily to Palma de Mallorca, Spain and New York. |
| Henry | United Kingdom | The ship was driven ashore at West Hartlepool, County Durham. |
| Macaulay | United Kingdom | The ship was driven ashore at the mouth of the Patapsco River. She was on a voyage from Cardiff, Glamorgan to Baltimore, Maryland, United States. |
| Raisbeck | United Kingdom | The ship ran aground at the mouth of the River Tyne. She was on a voyage from Newcastle upon Tyne, Northumberland to Sunderland, County Durham. She was refloated and put back to Newcastle upon Tyne in a leaky condition. |
| Rose | United Kingdom | The ship ran aground off Grimsby, Lincolnshire. She was on a voyage from South Shields, County Durham to Genoa, Kingdom of Sardinia. She was refloated and taken in to Grimsby in a leaky condition. |
| Sanatoga | United States | The ship was driven ashore at Crookhaven, County Cork, United Kingdom. She was on a voyage from Mobile, Alabama, United States to Liverpool, Lancashire, United Kingdom. She was refloated. |

== 6 January ==
List of shipwrecks: 6 January 1861
| Ship | State | Description |
|---|---|---|
| Arethusa | United Kingdom | The brig ran aground on the Cross Sand, in the North Sea off the coast of Norfolk and sank. Her eight crew were rescued by the Caister Lifeboat. She was on a voyage from South Shields, County Durham to Dieppe, Seine-Inférieure, France. |
| Brandywine | United States | The full-rigged ship was driven ashore and wrecked at Churchtown, County Wexford, United Kingdom. Her crew were rescued. She was on a voyage from Liverpool, Lancashire, United Kingdom to Mobile, Alabama. |
| David Brown | United States | The extreme clipper was abandoned in the Atlantic Ocean (22°16′N 30°50′W). All on board took to two boats. They were rescued by the barques Observador (Spain) and Sea Wave (United Kingdom). David Brown was on a voyage from San Francisco, California to Liverpool. |
| Diadem | United Kingdom | The ship collided with Caledonian and sank in the Belfast Lough. Her crew were rescued by Caledonian. |
| Ernani | Austrian Empire | The polacca was driven ashore 20 nautical miles (37 km) east of Almeria, Spain. Her crew were rescued. She was on a voyage from Constantinople, Ottoman Empire to Falmouth, Cornwall, United Kingdom. |
| Glenlyon | United Kingdom | The ship was abandoned in the Atlantic Ocean. Her crew were rescued by Annapolis (United States). Glenlyon was on a voyage from Savannah, Georgia, United States to Liverpool. |
| Hesperus | United States | The ship was destroyed by fire at Woosung, China. Her crew survived. She was on a voyage from Liverpool to Woosung. |
| Mary | United Kingdom | The ship was wrecked on the Bottle Creek Reef, in the Caicos Islands. She was on a voyage from Halifax, Nova Scotia, British North America to Cuba. |
| Ocean Bride | United Kingdom | The brig ran aground on the Gryees Rocks, off Dundee, Forfarshire. She was refloated. |
| Raisbeck | United Kingdom | The ship ran aground at South Shields. She was on a voyage from South Shields to Sunderland, County Durham. She was refloated and put back to South Shields in a severely leaky condition. |
| T. Raymond | United States | The schooner was driven ashore on Lovells Island, Massachusetts. She was on a voyage from "Wilmington, Nova Scotia" to Boston, Massachusetts. She was later refloated and taken in to Boston. |
| William and James | United Kingdom | The schooner was discovered abandoned north of Tynemouth Castle, Northumberland. She was on a voyage from the River Tyne to London. She was towed in to South Shields in a derelict condition by the tug Liberty (United Kingdom). |

== 7 January ==
List of shipwrecks: 7 January 1861
| Ship | State | Description |
|---|---|---|
| Ann | United Kingdom | The schooner sank at Lowestoft, Suffolk. |
| Arethusa | United Kingdom | The brig was wrecked on the Cross Sand, in the North Sea off the coast of Norfolk. Her seven crew were rescued by the Caister Lifeboat. She was on a voyage from Newcastle upon Tyne, Northumberland to Dieppe, Seine-Inférieure, France. |
| Balance | Grand Duchy of Mecklenburg-Schwerin | The brig was driven ashore at Tetney, Lincolnshire, United Kingdom. |
| Birmingham | United States | The ship was destroyed by fire at Mobile, Alabama. She was on a voyage from Mobile to Liverpool, Lancashire, United Kingdom. |
| Harlequin | United Kingdom | The ship sprang a leak and was beached at Grimsby, Lincolnshire. She was on a voyage from Sunderland, County Durham to London. She was later refloated and taken in to Grimsby. |
| Nuevo Antiquoia | Flag unknown | The ship was lost near "Honda". She was on a voyage from "Conjo" to "Honda". |
| Prince of Wales | (United Kingdom of Great Britain and Ireland) New South Wales | The schooner was wrecked on the Point Lonsdale Reef. Her crew were rescued. |
| Rosalia | Kingdom of the Two Sicilies | The brig ran aground at Cagliari, Sardinai. She was on a voyage from Palermo, Sicily to London, United Kingdom. She was later refloated. |
| Thorbecke | Netherlands | The schooner was driven ashore and wrecked at Gravelines, Nord, France. Her crew were rescued. She was on a voyage from Newcastle upon Tyne to Seville, Spain. |
| Trafalgar | United Kingdom | The steamship ran aground on the Burbo Bank, in Liverpool Bay. She was on a voyage from Dublin to Liverpool, Lancashire. She was refloated and taken in to Liverpool. |

== 8 January ==
List of shipwrecks: 8 January 1861
| Ship | State | Description |
|---|---|---|
| British Emperor | United Kingdom | The full-rigged ship was driven ashore and wrecked at Chatham, Massachusetts. |
| Henri François | France | The brig was wrecked on the Longsand, in the North Sea off the coast of Essex, United Kingdom. |
| Hesperus | United States | The clipper was destroyed by fire at Woosung, China. |
| Salacia | United Kingdom | The brig foundered in the North Sea off Whitby, Yorkshire. Her crew were rescued by Cyrus (United Kingdom). Salacia was on a voyage from South Shields, County Durham to London. |
| Surinam | United Kingdom | The ship was driven ashore at Waterloo, Lancashire. She was on a voyage from Liverpool, Lancashire to Valencia, Spain. She was refloated the next day and resumed her voyage. |
| Victoria | Austrian Empire | The brig ran aground on the Goodwin Sands, Kent. United Kingdom. Her crew were rescued by the lugger Félicité (France). Victoria was on a voyage from Newcastle upon Tyne, Northumberland, United Kingdom to Gibraltar. She floated off and was discovered off North Foreland, Kent. She wastaken in to Ramsgate, Kent in a leaky condition. |

== 9 January ==
List of shipwrecks: 9 January 1861
| Ship | State | Description |
|---|---|---|
| Adoloi | Austrian Empire | The barque was driven ashore in the Bosphorus, She was on a voyage from Brăila, Ottoman Empire to an English port. |
| Adventure | United Kingdom | The brig was driven ashore and wrecked at Seascale, Cumberland with the loss of a crew member. She was on a voyage from Dublin to Whitehaven, Cumberland. |
| Ellen | United Kingdom | The trow capsized and sank in the Bristol Channel off the coast of Somerset with the loss of all four crew. |
| John and Edward | United Kingdom | The ship was abandoned between The Manacles and Black Head, Cornwall. Her crew were rescued. She was on a voyage from Fowey, Cornwall to Newport, Monmouthshire. |
| Maude | (United Kingdom of Great Britain and Ireland) British North America | The schooner was abandoned in the Atlantic Ocean (51°11′N 23°30′W). Her crew were rescued by the steamship Asia (United Kingdom). Maude was on a voyage from Quebec City, Province of Canada to Gloucester. |
| Shamrock | (United Kingdom of Great Britain and Ireland) New South Wales | The brig was wrecked at Palliser Bay, New Zealand. She was en route from Auckland to Otago, when she was caught in a severe gale with mountainous seas. Her sails were all blown out. The captain steered the vessel onto the beach at Whangaimoana so as to avoid the danger of being dashed on the rocks. |
| Susan Henry | United Kingdom | The ship was abandoned north of Fredrikshavn, Denmark. She was on a voyage from a Scottish port to Horsens, Denmark. She was later taken in to Fredrikshavn. |
| William Jenkins | United States | The 1,011- or 1,012-ton sidewheel paddle steamer burned at Savannah, Georgia. |

== 10 January ==
List of shipwrecks: 10 January 1861
| Ship | State | Description |
|---|---|---|
| Acheen | United Kingdom | The schooner was driven ashore at Boulmer, Northumberland. She was on a voyage from London to Largo, Fife. She was refloated on 12 January and taken in to Warkworth, Northumberland. |
| Bakker | Netherlands | The ship ran aground on the Pampus, off the coast of Zeeland. She was refloated and towed in to Hellevoetsluis by a tug. |
| Dionisio | United States of the Ionian Islands | The schooner was driven ashore at Valona, Ottoman Empire. She was on a voyage from Trieste to Corfu. |
| Haberdina | Netherlands | The galiot ran aground on the South Pampus, off the coast of Zeeland. She was later refloated and taken in to Hellevoetsluis, having been severely damaged by ice. |
| Lena | United Kingdom | The brig was discovered abandoned in the North Sea off the Dudgeon Sandbank by the steamship Hawke (United Kingdom). She was towed in to Lowestoft, Suffolk. She had been on a voyage from South Shields, County Durham to Great Yarmouth, Norfolk. |
| Luçonnais | France | The schooner was abandoned in ice off L'Aiguillon-sur-Mer, Vendée. She was subsequently taken in to Saint-Martin-de-Ré, Charente-Inférieure. |
| Mary Miller | United Kingdom | The ship was driven ashore near Gibraltar. She was on a voyage from Liverpool, Lancashire to Odesa. |
| Sinope | United Kingdom | The brig sprang a leak and sank in the Bristol Channel 20 nautical miles (37 km) west of Lundy Island, Devon and sank. Her eleven crew survived. She was on a voyage from Swansea, Glamorgan to Dieppe, Seine-Inférieure, France. |
| Virginia | Malta | The ship was wrecked near Valona. She was on a voyage from Malta to Venice, Kingdom of Lombardy–Venetia. |

== 11 January ==
List of shipwrecks: 11 January 1861
| Ship | State | Description |
|---|---|---|
| Invention | Denmark | The ship was driven ashore by ice 4 nautical miles (7.4 km) south of Helsingør. She was on a voyage from Libava, Courland Governorate to Hull, Yorkshire, United Kingdom. |
| Isabella Anderson | United Kingdom | The smack was wrecked at Wick, Caithness. Her crew were rescued. She was on a voyage from Burghead, Moray to Keiss, Caithness. |
| Samuel and Ann | United Kingdom | The schooner was driven ashore at Flamborough Head, Yorkshire. She was on a voyage from Ramsgate, Kent to Hartlepool, County Durham. She was later refloated and taken in to Bridlington, Yorkshire. |
| St. Croix | (United Kingdom of Great Britain and Ireland) Jersey | The schooner was driven ashore at Lindisfarne, Northumberland. She was on a voyage from Jersey to North Berwick, Lothian. She was refloated and resumed her voyage. |

== 12 January ==
List of shipwrecks: 12 January 1861
| Ship | State | Description |
|---|---|---|
| Ada | (United Kingdom of Great Britain and Ireland) New Zealand | The steamer was wrecked at the mouth of the Clutha River, New Zealand. She hit the bar at the river's mouth and was holed. The crew and all seven passengers landed safely. |
| A. D. Wheddon | United Kingdom | The brig was damaged by ice in the Clyde at Glasgow, Renfrewshire. |
| Alma | United Kingdom | The steamship was damaged by ice in the Clyde at Glasgow. |
| Almana | United Kingdom | The brig was damaged by ice in the Clyde at Glasgow. |
| Amelia | United Kingdom | The brig was damaged by ice in the Clyde at Glasgow. |
| Ann | United Kingdom | The schooner was driven ashore at Ayr. She was on a voyage from Dundalk, County Louth to Ayr. |
| Barbara | United Kingdom | The steam lighter was severely damaged by ice in the Clyde at Glasgow. |
| Birkby | United Kingdom | The brig was damaged by ice in the Clyde at Glasgow. |
| Blanch | United Kingdom | The ship was damaged by ice in the Clyde at Glasgow. |
| Bucephalus | United Kingdom | The ship ran aground on the Sandhale Flat, off the coast of Lincolnshire. She was refloated. |
| Burnside | United Kingdom | The brig was damaged by ice in the Clyde at Glasgow. |
| Catherine | United Kingdom | The ship was driven ashore at the Roan Heads, Aberdeenshire. She was on a voyage from Seaham, County Durham to Montrose, Forfarshire. She was refloated and found to be leaky. |
| Ceres | United Kingdom | The full-rigged ship was damaged by ice in the Clyde at Glasgow. |
| Clyde | United Kingdom | The lighter was damaged by ice in the Clyde at Glasgow. |
| Dalhousie | United Kingdom | The barque was severely damaged by ice in the Clyde at Glasgow. |
| Druid | United Kingdom | The steamship was damaged by ice in the Clyde at Glasgow. |
| Edgar | United Kingdom | The ship was damaged by ice in the Clyde at Glasgow. |
| Elbe | Flag unknown | The brig was damaged by ice in the Clyde at Glasgow. |
| Elfin | United Kingdom | The ship was damaged by ice in the Clyde at Glasgow. |
| Fairly | United Kingdom | The smack was damaged by ice in the Clyde at Glasgow. |
| Forest Queen | United Kingdom | The brig was damaged by ice in the Clyde at Glasgow. |
| Gartha | United Kingdom | The steam lighter was severely damaged by ice in the Clyde at Glasgow. |
| Glasgow | United Kingdom | The schooner was damaged by ice in the Clyde at Glasgow. |
| Globus | Bremen | The full-rigged ship was destroyed by fire in the Atlantic Ocean with the loss of one life. Survivors were rescued by Morning Star (United States). Globus was on a voyage from Bremen to New York, United States. |
| Haba | United Kingdom | The brigantine was damaged by ice in the Clyde at Glasgow. |
| Hesperus | United States | The ship was damaged by ice in the Clyde at Glasgow. |
| Hilja | United Kingdom | The barque ran aground at Charleston, South Carolina, United States. She was on a voyage from Charleston to Liverpool, Lancashire |
| Jessie, and Lady Kelburne | United Kingdom | The steam lighter Jessie was driven into the paddle steamer Lady Kelburne by ice in the Clyde at Glasgow and was severely damaged. Lady Kelburn was damaged at her stern. |
| John Lawson | United Kingdom | The brig was damaged by ice in the Clyde at Glasgow. |
| Julez | France | The brigantine was severely damaged by ice in the Clyde at Glasgow. |
| Kandy | United Kingdom | The schooner was damaged by ice in the Clyde at Glasgow. |
| King of the Forest | United Kingdom | The schooner was damaged by ice in the Clyde at Glasgow. |
| Magnus Troll | United Kingdom | The schooner was damaged by ice in the Clyde at Glasgow. |
| Marcellus | United Kingdom | The barque was severely damaged by ice and sank in the Clyde at Glasgow. |
| Margaret Jane | United Kingdom | The schooner was damaged by ice in the Clyde at Glasgow. |
| Martin | United Kingdom | The schooner was damaged by ice in the Clyde at Glasgow. |
| McAlpine | United Kingdom | The brig was driven ashore by ice in the River Tweed. She was refloated and taken in to Berwick upon Tweed, Northumberland. |
| M. H. Hine | United Kingdom | The ship was damaged by ice in the Clyde at Glasgow. |
| Molly | United Kingdom | The brig was damaged by ice in the Clyde at Glasgow. |
| Molly Bawn | United Kingdom | The brig was damaged by ice in the Clyde at Glasgow. |
| Oddfellow | United Kingdom | The lighter was damaged by ice in the Clyde at Glasgow. |
| Pearl | (United Kingdom of Great Britain and Ireland) Isle of Man | The smack was damaged by ice in the Clyde at Glasgow. |
| Phoenix | United Kingdom | The ship ran aground on the Sprat Sand and was damaged. She was refloated. |
| Pinta | United Kingdom | The ship was sunk by ice in the Black Sea off Tulcea, Ottoman Empire. She was on a voyage from the Danube to an English port. |
| Pioneer | United Kingdom | The steam lighter was sunk by ice in the Clyde at Glasgow. Her crew were rescued by a tug. |
| Planet | United Kingdom | The schooner ran aground on the Goodwin Sands, Kent. She was on a voyage from Boulogne, Pas-de-Calais, France to Whitby, Yorkshire. She was refloated. |
| President | United Kingdom | The smack was driven from her moorings by ice in the Clyde at Glasgow. |
| Prima Donna | United Kingdom | The brig was damaged by ice in the Clyde at Glasgow. |
| Queen of the Fleet | United Kingdom | The brig was damaged by ice in the Clyde at Glasgow. |
| Raven | United Kingdom | The lighter was damaged by ice in the Clyde at Glasgow. |
| Robert | United Kingdom | The steam lighter was sunk by ice in the Clyde at Glasgow. |
| Robert and Ann | United Kingdom | The steam lighter was sunk by ice in the Clyde at Glasgow. Carried downstream, she struck the piers of a bridge and broke in two. |
| Roseneath | United Kingdom | The full-rigged ship was damaged by ice in the Clyde at Glasgow. |
| Rump | United Kingdom | The schooner was damaged by ice in the Clyde at Glasgow. |
| Sainte Fleur | France | The schooner was wrecked on the Castel Rhins Rocks, on the coast of Morbihan. She was on a voyage from Cardiff, Glamorgan, United Kingdom to Nantes, Loire-Inférieure. |
| Scipione | Austrian Empire | The brig was wrecked at Tenedos, Ottoman Empire. She was on a voyage from Galaţi, Ottoman Empire to an English port. |
| Spartan | United Kingdom | The brig was wrecked by ice in the Clyde at Glasgow. |
| St. Andrew's | United Kingdom | The ship was wrecked near Braystones, Cumberland. Her crew were rescued. She was on a voyage from Maryport, Cumberland to Dublin. |
| St. Magnus | United Kingdom | The full-rigged ship was damaged by ice in the Clyde at Glasgow. |
| Susan | United Kingdom | The ship was abandoned in the Atlantic Ocean. Her crew were rescued by Coronet (United Kingdom). Susan was on a voyage from New York, United States to Plymouth, Devon. |
| Swift | (United Kingdom of Great Britain and Ireland) New Zealand | The schooner was wrecked at the mouth of the Warehama River, on New Zealand's North Island east coast. She hit the bar at the river's mouth during a heavy gale. The crew and all seven passengers landed safely. |
| Swift | United Kingdom | The schooner was damaged by ice in the Clyde at Glasgow. |
| Trojan | United Kingdom | The barque was damaged by ice in the Clyde at Glasgow. |
| Utopia | United Kingdom | The brigantine was damaged by ice in the Clyde at Glasgow. |
| Vigilant | United Kingdom | The barque was severely damaged by ice in the Clyde at Glasgow. |
| Virginia | United States | The full-rigged ship was damaged by ice in the Clyde at Glasgow. |
| Wyre | United Kingdom | The schooner was damaged by ice in the Clyde at Glasgow. |

== 13 January ==
List of shipwrecks: 13 January 1861
| Ship | State | Description |
|---|---|---|
| Black Monster | United States | The barque was abandoned in the Atlantic Ocean. Her crew were rescued by Petigrew (United States). Black Monster was on a voyage from Baltimore, Maryland to Rio de Janeiro, Brazil. |
| David Faye | Norway | The barque ran aground off Ursholmen, Sweden and sank. She was on a voyage from Leith, Lothian, United Kingdom to Christiania. |
| Javaan | Netherlands | The ship was driven ashore at Egmond aan Zee, North Holland. She was on a voyage from Batavia, Netherlands East Indies to Amsterdam, North Holland. She was refloated the next day and taken in to Texel, North Holland in a leaky condition. |
| Maesi | United Kingdom | The ship was driven ashore at Blakeney, Norfolk. She was on a voyage from Hartlepool, County Durham to Plymouth, Devon. She was refloated and resumed her voyage. |
| Prince Alfred | United Kingdom | The steamship was driven ashore and wrecked at Flamborough Head, Yorkshire. All on board were rescued. She was on a voyage from Leith to London. |
| Tinos | United States | The barque was wrecked near Hakodate, Japan. Her crew were rescued by the schooner Caroline E. Foote (United States. Tinos was on a voyage from Shanghai, China to a port in Japan. |
| Trump | United Kingdom | The paddle tug was holed by ice and sank at North Shields, County Durham. Subsequently refloated and scrapped. |

== 14 January ==
List of shipwrecks: 14 January 1861
| Ship | State | Description |
|---|---|---|
| Activa, and Marquis de la Victoria | Spain | The steamship Marquis de la Victoria collided with the schooner Activa. Both vessels were severely damaged. Marquis de la Victoria put in to Ceuta in a sinking condition. Activa was towed in to Málaga in a wrecked condition by the full-rigged ship Emilia Eloise ( Kingdom of Sardinia). |
| Britannia | United Kingdom | The brig ran aground at Hartlepool, County Durham. She was refloated and taken in to Hartlepool. |
| Candour | United Kingdom | The schooner was driven ashore 2 nautical miles (3.7 km) east of Ryde, Isle of Wight. She was on a voyage from Swansea, Glamorgan to Boulogne, Pas-de-Calais, France. She was refloated on 25 January and towed in to Portsmouth, Hampshire. |
| Charlotte Knuth | Denmark | The ship was driven ashore on Skagen. She was on a voyage from Newcastle upon Tyne, Northumberland, United Kingdom to Korsør. |
| Christina | Sweden | The barque was driven ashore and wrecked at Middleton, County Durham. |
| Elizabeth | United Kingdom | The brig ran aground on the Holm Sand, in the North Sea off the coast of Suffolk. She was refloated and resumed her voyage. |
| Emily | United Kingdom | The Mersey Flat collided with Saratoga (United States) and sank in the River Mersey. |
| Ernest Arthur | France | The schooner foundered off Guilvinec, Finistère. Her crew were rescued. She was on a voyage from Luçon, Vendée to Hull, Yorkshire, United Kingdom. |
| James Watt | United Kingdom | The steamship was sunk by ice in the Clyde at Glasgow, Renfrewshire. Her crew survived. |
| Janus | (United Kingdom of Great Britain and Ireland) British North America | The brigantine departed from Saint John's, Newfoundland for Lisbon, Portugal. No further trace, presumed foundered with the loss of all hands. |
| Margaret and Elizabeth | United Kingdom | The schooner ran aground at Dundalk, County Louth. She was on a voyage from Troon, Ayrshire to Dundalk. She was refloated and taken in to Dundalk, where she sank. |
| Mary Carson | United Kingdom | The ship caught fire in the Atlantic Ocean. She was abandoned the next day. Her crew were rescued on 16 January by Henry Brigham (United States). Mary Carson was on a voyage from Charleston, South Carolina, United States to London. |
| Messenger | (United Kingdom of Great Britain and Ireland) Jersey | The schooner ran aground on the Goodwin Sands, Kent. She was on a voyage from Seaham, County Durham to Jersey. She was refloated and taken in to Ramsgate, Kent. |
| Pearl | United Kingdom | The ship was abandoned off Lambay Island, County Dublin. She was on a voyage from Belfast, County Antrim to Drogheda, County Louth. She was subsequently taken in to Howth, County Dublin. |
| Sarah Love | United Kingdom | The barque ran aground and broke her back on the Rose Bank, in the English Channel off Camber, Sussex. She was on a voyage from Saint Vincent to London. She was refloated with assistance of the tug Nelly (United Kingdom) and taken in tow for London. |

== 15 January ==
List of shipwrecks: 15 January 1861
| Ship | State | Description |
|---|---|---|
| Angia | (United Kingdom of Great Britain and Ireland) Jersey | The barque was severely damaged in an accident in a floating dock at Jersey. |
| Bolderaa | United Kingdom | The steamship was driven ashore at Helsingør, Denmark. She was on a voyage from Danzig to London. She had been refloated by 16 January. |
| Charles Henry | United Kingdom | The collier, a brig, was abandoned by all but her captain in the North Sea 20 nautical miles (37 km) south east of the mouth of the River Humber. One crew member drowned. Survivors were rescued by the collier brig Elizabeth Young (United Kingdom). |
| Cockermouth Castle | United Kingdom | The collier was wrecked on the Inner Dowsing Sand, in the North Sea off the coast of Norfolk. Her eight crew survived. She was on a voyage from Newcastle upon Tyne, Northumberland to Dieppe, Seine-Inférieure, France. |
| Gleanings | United Kingdom | The schooner was driven ashore at Penarth, Glamorgan. She was refloated with assistance from the tug Pilot (United Kingdom). |
| Industrie | Belgium | The full-rigged ship ran aground at Ostend, West Flanders. She was on a voyage from Newcastle upon Tyne, Northumberland, United Kingdom to Ostend. |
| Mariner | United Kingdom | The schooner was driven ashore and wrecked at Tynemouth, Northumberland. Her crew were rescued by the North Shields Lifeboat. She was on a voyage from Brixham, Devon to North Shields, County Durham. |
| Mayor | United Kingdom | The collier was wrecked on the Middle Sand, in the North Sea off the coast of Essex. Her crew were rescued by the smack Victoria (United Kingdom) Mayor was on a voyage from Sunderland, County Durham to London. |
| Melanie | United Kingdom | The ship departed from New York, United States for Queenstown, County Cork. No further trace, presumed foundered with the loss of all hands. |
| Patrick Down | United Kingdom | The ship foundered off Holyhead, Anglesey. Her crew were rescued. She was on a voyage from Garston, Lancashire to Kingstown, County Dublin. |
| Scandinavian | Sweden | The barque was driven ashore at Middleton, County Durham. Her crew were rescued. |
| Sirocco | United Kingdom | The brig ran aground in the River Thames at Tilbury, Essex with the loss of a crew member. |
| Test | United Kingdom | The brig was driven ashore and wrecked 3 nautical miles (5.6 km) south of Cahore, County Wexford. Her thirteen crew were rescued by rocket apparatus. She was on a voyage from Mauritius to Glasgow, Renfrewshire. |
| Theodore | France | The brig was driven ashore and wrecked at Skinningrove, Yorkshire, United Kingdom with the loss of seven of her eight crew. She was on a voyage from Newcastle upon Tyne to Dieppe, Seine-Inférieure. |
| Wax | United Kingdom | The brig foundered in the Irish Sea off the Skerries with the loss of all hands. |
| Zephyr | United Kingdom | The collier was wrecked on the Middle Sand with the loss of two of her crew. Survivors were rescued by the smack Queen Victoria (United Kingdom). Zephyr was on a voyage from Stockton-on-Tees, County Durham to London. |

== 16 January ==
List of shipwrecks: 16 January 1861
| Ship | State | Description |
|---|---|---|
| Aid | United Kingdom | The ship capsized off Lowestoft, Suffolk. |
| Anfion | Austrian Empire | The barque was abandoned in the Atlantic Ocean. Her crew were rescued by Mary Crocker (United Kingdom). Anfion was on a voyage from New York, United States to Cork, United Kingdom. |
| Beulah | United Kingdom | The brig ran aground at Hartlepool, County Durham. She floated off but was driven ashore and wrecked at Middleton. |
| Calhoun | United Kingdom | The ship was driven ashore by ice between Bedloe Island and Ellis Island, New York City, United States. She was later refloated. |
| Fearless | United States | The ship was driven ashore by ice between Bedloe Island and Ellis Island. She was later refloated. |
| Glycine | France | The ship was driven ashore and wrecked at Wissant, Pas-de-Calais and was abandoned by her crew. She was on a voyage from Seaham, County Durham to Fécamp, Seine-Inférieure. |
| L. N. Godfrey | United States | The schooner collided with Perthshire (United Kingdom) and was abandoned off Alexander, Virginia. Her crew were rescued by Perthshire. L. N. Godfrey was on a voyage from Baltimore, Maryland to New York. |
| Moustria | Belgium | The schooner sank at Ostend, West Flanders. She was refloated on 20 January and placed under repair. |
| William Peill | United Kingdom | The ship was driven ashore 100 nautical miles (190 km) south of the mouth of the Rio Grande. Her crew survived. She was on a voyage from Liverpool, Lancashire to Buenos Aires, Argentina. |
| Weser | French Navy | The transport ship was wrecked at the mouth of the Mekong River. |

== 17 January ==
List of shipwrecks: 17 January 1861
| Ship | State | Description |
|---|---|---|
| Alma | United Kingdom | The full-rigged ship foundered in the Indian Ocean with the loss of a crew member. She was on a voyage from London to Bombay and Kurrachee, India. |
| City of York | United Kingdom | The ship was driven ashore at the Haulbowline Lighthouse, County Down. She was refloated on 19 January and towed in to the Greencastle Roads in a severely damaged condition. City of York subsequently drove ashore at Greenisland, County Antrim. She was refloated and towed in to Warrenpoint, County Down in a waterlogged condition. |
| Colona | France | The schooner was driven ashore at Plounéour Point, Finistère. Her crew were rescued. She was on a voyage from Nantes, Loire-Inférieure to Swansea, Glamorgan, United Kingdom. She had broken up by 24 January. |
| Parland | United Kingdom | The barque was wrecked on Beata Island, Dominican Republic. Her crew survived. |

== 18 January ==
List of shipwrecks: 18 January 1861
| Ship | State | Description |
|---|---|---|
| Anna Paulowna | Netherlands | The steamship was driven ashore and wrecked at Cape Spartel, Morocco with the loss of six of her 22 crew. She was on a voyage from Amsterdam, North Holland to Marseille, Bouches-du-Rhône, France, and Genoa, Kingdom of Sardinia. |
| Boston | United Kingdom | The brig was driven ashore by ice on Spectacle Island, Massachusetts, United States. She was on a voyage from Halifax, Nova Scotia, British North America to Boston, Massachusetts. She was later refloated and towed in to Boston. |
| Hebe | United Kingdom | The brig was driven ashore at Great Yarmouth, Norfolk. She was on a voyage from South Shields, County Durham to London. She was refloated the next day. |
| Rieka | Netherlands | The galiot foundered off Cape St. Vincent, Portugal. Her crew were rescued by the barque Vasco de Gama ( Kingdom of Sardinia). Rieka was on a voyage from Huelva, Spain to Newcastle upon Tyne, Northumberland, United Kingdom. |
| Robert | France | The ship struck a rock in the Raz de Sein and was damaged. She was on a voyage from Bordeaux, Gironde to Saint-Valery-sur-Somme, Somme. She put in to Abrevach, Finistère in a leaky condition. |

== 19 January ==
List of shipwrecks: 19 January 1861
| Ship | State | Description |
|---|---|---|
| Elizabeth | United Kingdom | The ship was driven ashore at Redcar, Yorkshire. She was on a voyage from Dundee, Forfarshire to Hartlepool, County Durham. She was refloated and taken in to Hartlepool in a leaky condition. |
| Evangelistria | Greece | The brig was driven ashore at Chania. |
| Orient | Stettin | The ship was damaged by ice off Malmö, Sweden. She was taken in to Copenhagen, Denmark on 28 January for repairs. |
| Versailles | France | The full-rigged ship was driven ashore in North Bay, County Wexford, United Kingdom. She was on a voyage from Liverpool, Lancashire, United Kingdom to Shanghai, China. |

== 20 January ==
List of shipwrecks: 20 January 1861
| Ship | State | Description |
|---|---|---|
| Eclipse | United Kingdom | The ship was holed by her anchor and sank in the River Yare. She was on a voyage from Leith, Lothian to London. She was refloated and placed under repair. |
| Mœander | United Kingdom | The steamship ran aground in the River Mersey. She was on a voyage from Liverpool, Lancashire to Genoa, Kingdom of Sardinia. She was refloated the next day and put back to Liverpool in a leaky condition. |

== 21 January ==
List of shipwrecks: 21 January 1861
| Ship | State | Description |
|---|---|---|
| Dewi Wynn | United Kingdom | The schooner was wrecked at Cardigan, Wales. Her eight crew were rescued by the Cardigan Lifeboat. She was on a voyage from Bristol, Gloucestershire to Cardigan. She was later refloated and taken in to Pwllcam in a severely damaged condition. |
| Famous | United Kingdom | The schooner sprang a leak and was beached south of Warkworth, Northumberland. Her crew were rescued. She was on a voyage from Burntisland, Fife to Middlesbrough, Yorkshire. |
| Hardy | United Kingdom | The barque ran aground on the Kimmeridge Ledge, in the English Channel off the coast of Dorset. All on board were rescued by the schooner Gipsey (United Kingdom). Hardy was on a voyage from London to Demerara, British Guiana. |
| Joanna | United Kingdom | The schooner ran aground at Dungarvan, County Waterford. |
| Ploughboy | United Kingdom | The Yorkshire Billyboy sank in the Nieuw Diep. she was on a voyage from Hull, Yorkshire to London. |
| Samuel Wilmington | United Kingdom | The brig was driven ashore near Workington, Cumberland. She was on a voyage from Whitehaven, Cumberland to Dublin. |
| Thomas Mahoney | United Kingdom | The schooner ran aground at Dungarvan. |
| West Rocks | United Kingdom | The schooner ran aground at Dungarvan. |

== 22 January ==
List of shipwrecks: 22 January 1861
| Ship | State | Description |
|---|---|---|
| Angelita | Spain | The ship ran aground in the Elbe and sank. Her crew were rescued by the schooner Luis (Spain). Angelita was on a voyage from Havana, Cuba to Hamburg. |
| Cora Anderson | United States | The 658-ton sidewheel paddle steamer sank in the Mississippi River at Eagle Bend, Mississippi. She was refloated and returned to service. |
| Faithful | United Kingdom | The barque was driven ashore 5 nautical miles (9.3 km) west of "Requitas", Spain. She was on a voyage from Malta to London, or from the Danube to Falmouth, Cornwall. She was later refloated and taken in to "Requitas". |
| Magnet, and Sarah Anne | United Kingdom | The tug Magnet suffered an engine failure whilst towing the schooner Sarah Anne. She was driven ashore and wrecked on the Black Rocks, near Neath, Glamorgan. Sarah Anne was also driven ashore. |
| New York | Hamburg | The steamship ran aground in the Weser. She was on a voyage from Hamburg to New York, United States. She was refloated on 24 January and resumed her voyage. |
| Surprise | United Kingdom | The ship was abandoned in the Atlantic Ocean. Her crew were rescued. She was on a voyage from Havana to Queenstown, County Cork. |

== 23 January ==
List of shipwrecks: 23 January 1861
| Ship | State | Description |
|---|---|---|
| Catherine | United Kingdom | The ship ran aground in the Thanlwin and was wrecked. She was on a voyage from Moulmein, Burma to Calcutta, India. |
| Ellen and Henry | United Kingdom | The ship was driven ashore at Briton Ferry, Glamorgan. She was refloated. |
| George Lawrence | United Kingdom | The ship was driven ashore at Briton Ferry. She was refloated. |
| Jany and Harry | United Kingdom | The ship was driven ashore at Briton Ferry. She was refloated. |
| Springbok | United Kingdom | The ship put in to Falmouth, Cornwall on fire and was scuttled. She was on a voyage from the Cape of Good Hope, Cape Colony to London. |
| Yssel | Netherlands | The ship ran aground in the Nieuw Diep near Huisduinen, North Holland. She was on a voyage from Batavia, Netherlands East Indies to Amsterdam, North Holland. She was later refloated and taken in to "Mieiuvediep". |

== 24 January ==
List of shipwrecks: 24 January 1861
| Ship | State | Description |
|---|---|---|
| Catharine and Ann | United Kingdom | The ship ran aground on The Manacles. She was on a voyage from Taganrog, Russia to Falmouth, Cornwall. She was refloated and put in to Fowey, Cornwall in a leaky condition. |
| E. G. Stolterfoht | United States | The brig capsized at Liverpool, Lancashire, United Kingdom. |
| Erin | United Kingdom | The schooner was driven ashore and wrecked at Londonderry. Her crew were rescued. She was on a voyage from Ayr to Londonderry. |
| Jane and Ann | United Kingdom | The brig was driven ashore at Flamborough Head, Yorkshire. She was on a voyage from London to Liverpool, Lancashire. She was refloated and taken in to Bridlington, Yorkshire. |
| La Reine le Breton | France | The ship was driven ashore at Wijk aan Zee, North Holland, Netherlands. Her crew were rescued. She was on a voyage from Nantes, Loire-Inférieure to Amsterdam, North Holland. |
| Spring | United Kingdom | The brig ran aground on the Gunfleet Sand, in the North Sea off the coast of Essex. She was on a voyage from Newcastle upon Tyne, Northumberland to Rochester, Kent. She was later refloated and resumed her voyage, arriving on 30 January. |
| Union | Duchy of Holstein | The schooner was driven ashore and wrecked on Læsø, Denmark with the loss of five of her seven crew. She was on a voyage from Newcastle upon Tyne, Northumberland, United Kingdom to Kiel, Prussia. |

== 25 January ==
List of shipwrecks: 25 January 1861
| Ship | State | Description |
|---|---|---|
| Antoinetta | Austrian Empire | The ship was wrecked in the Krka. She was on a voyage from Venice, Kingdom of Lombardy–Venetia to Sebenico, Austrian Empire (now Šibenik, Croatia). |
| Artagnan | Sweden | The schooner ran aground on "Lisburne". She was on a voyage from Stockholm to Newcastle upon Tyne, Northumberland, United Kingdom. She was refloated and taken in to "Wargo" in a leaky condition. |
| Catherine | United Kingdom | The ship struck The Manacles and was damaged. She was on a voyage from Taganrog, Russia to Falmouth, Cornwall. She put in to Fowey, Cornwall in a leaky condition. |
| City of Boston | United States | The ship departed from New York for Queenstown, County Cork, United Kingdom. No further trace, presumed foundered with the loss of all hands. |
| Don Juan | France | The ship was lost in the Bahama Channel. Her crew were rescued. She was on a voyage from Havana, Cuba to China. |
| Empress Eugenie | United Kingdom | The steamship sprang a leak and foundered 30 nautical miles (56 km) north east of Point Lynas, Anglesey. All 34 people on board were rescued by the paddle steamer Countess of Galloway (United Kingdom). Empress Eugenie was on a voyage from Liverpool, Lancashire to London. |
| Florence | United Kingdom | The ship was wrecked in Dingle Bay with the loss of twelve of her seventeen crew. She was on a voyage from the Rio Benito to Liverpool. |
| Henri IV | France | The steamship was wrecked at "Amastra", Ottoman Empire. All on board were rescued by Telemarque (France). |
| Juno | Sweden | The schooner was wrecked at Nidingen. She was on a voyage from Newcastle upon Tyne to Landskrona. |
| Mercy | United Kingdom | The brig was wrecked at Porthleven, Cornwall. Her crew were rescued. She was on a voyage from Vigo, Spain to a Welsh port. |
| Sully | France | The steamship was wrecked at Trebizond, Ottoman Empire. Her crew were rescued. |

== 26 January ==
List of shipwrecks: 26 January 1861
| Ship | State | Description |
|---|---|---|
| Adeline | United States | The ship was driven ashore and wrecked on Terceira Island, Azores. Her crew were rescued. |
| Ann Duncan | United Kingdom | The brig was driven ashore and wrecked near Vourla, Ottoman Empire. |
| Barker | United Kingdom | The schooner was driven ashore at Redcar, Yorkshire. She was on a voyage from Sunderland, County Durham to Great Yarmouth, Norfolk. She was refloated then next day and taken in to Hartlepool, County Durham for repairs. |
| Bijou | United Kingdom | The ship was wrecked on São Miguel Island, Azores with the loss of all but her captain. |
| Blue Jacket | United Kingdom | The schooner was wrecked on São Miguel Island. Her crew survived. |
| Bradore | (United Kingdom of Great Britain and Ireland) Jersey | The ship was driven ashore and damaged on Terceira Island. Her crew were rescued. She was repaired. |
| Cotfield | United Kingdom | The ship was abandoned in the Atlantic Ocean (42°18′N 40°20′W). Her crew were rescued by the barque William and Jane (United Kingdom). Cotfield was on a voyage from Quebec City, Province of Canada, British North America to London. |
| Fanny Gann | United Kingdom | The ship was wrecked on São Miguel Island. Her crew survived. |
| Frolic | United Kingdom | The ship was wrecked on São Miguel Island. Her crew survived. |
| Galced | United Kingdom | The ship was driven ashore on Terceira Island. She was consequently condemned. |
| Jeune Adele | France | The lugger was wrecked on the Banjaard Sand, in the North Sea off the Dutch coast. Her crew were rescued. She was on a voyage from "Requejada", Spain to Antwerp, Belgium. |
| Magyar | United Kingdom | The collier, a brig, was run down and sunk in the North Sea by the steamship Rouen (United Kingdom) with the loss of six of her eight crew. The survivors were rescued by Mary (United Kingdom) and Rouen. Magyar was on a voyage from Hartlepool, County Durham to Exmouth, Devon. |
| Michael Angelo | France | The ship was wrecked on the Great Bahamas Bank. Her crew were rescued. She was on a voyage from New Orleans, Louisiana, United States to Havre de Grâce, Seine-Inférieure. |
| Mignon | United Kingdom | The ship was wrecked on São Miguel Island with the loss of all hands. |
| Orange Blossom | United Kingdom | The ship was wrecked on São Miguel Island. Her crew survived. |
| Palestine | United Kingdom | The collier, a brig, was run into by the steamship Carron (United Kingdom and sank in the River Thames at Woolwich, Kent. Her crew survived. |
| Prudence | France | The schooner was abandoned in the Raz de Sein. Her crew were rescued. She was on a voyage from a Portuguese port to Paimpol, Finistère. She was taken in to Brest, Finistère on 29 January. |
| Serpent | United Kingdom | The ship was wrecked on São Miguel Island with the loss of all hands. |
| Susannah | United Kingdom | The schooner was driven ashore and damaged at Redcar. She was on a voyage from Sunderland to Great Yarmouth. She was refloated on 28 January and taken in to Hartlepool. |
| Telemach | United Kingdom | The ship struck the quayside, ran aground, broke her back and sank at Liverpool, Lancashire. She was on a voyage from Bombay, India to Liverpool. |
| Terpsichore | United Kingdom | The ship ran aground at South Shields, County Durham. She was on a voyage from Liverpool to South Shields. She was refloated and taken in to South Shields in a severely leaky condition. |
| Waterwitch | (United Kingdom of Great Britain and Ireland) Guernsey | The ship was driven ashore and wrecked on Terceira Island. Her crew were rescued. |
| Wave Queen | (United Kingdom of Great Britain and Ireland) Jersey | The ship was driven ashore on Terceira Island. Her crew were rescued. |

== 27 January ==
List of shipwrecks: 27 January 1861
| Ship | State | Description |
|---|---|---|
| Hero | United States | The whaler collided with Jane Lakey (United Kingdom) and was then driven ashore in Algoa Bay, where she was wrecked. Her crew were rescued. |
| Levetzore | Flag unknown | The ship struck a rock and sank 4 nautical miles (7.4 km) off Alexandria, Egypt. Her crew survived. She was on a voyage from South Shields, County Durham, United Kingdom to Alexandria. |

== 28 January ==
List of shipwrecks: 28 January 1861
| Ship | State | Description |
|---|---|---|
| Aid | United States | The 60-ton sidewheel paddle steamer struck a snag on the St. Francis River in Arkansas and sank. |
| Corsair Noir | France | The ship ran aground at the mouth of the Lay. She was on a voyage from Sunderland, County Durham, United Kingdom to Angles, Vendée. She was refloated and taken in to Saint-Martin in a sinking condition. |
| Emma | (United Kingdom of Great Britain and Ireland) British North America | The ship was abandoned in the Atlantic Ocean. Her crew were rescued by Satellite (United Kingdom). Emma was on a voyage from Figueira da Foz, Portugal to Saint John, New Brunswick. |
| Grossfurst Constantin | Rostock | The steamship was holed by ice and foundered off Rügen, Prussia. Her crew were rescued. She was on a voyage from Charlestown to Rostock. |
| Lillydale | (United Kingdom of Great Britain and Ireland) British North America | The ship caught fire and was scuttled at Holyhead, Anglesey. She was on a voyage from Liverpool, Lancashire to Bombay, India. She was refloated on 30 January. |
| Marie Melanie | France | The lugger struck the quayside at Vlissingen, Zeeland, Netherlands and was damaged. She was on a voyage from a Spanish port to Antwerp, Belgium. |
| Pilot | United Kingdom | The steamship ran aground on the Newcombe Sand, in the North Sea off the coast of Suffolk. She was on a voyage from Newcastle upon Tyne, Northumberland to London. She was refloated the next day. |
| Uredan | Austrian Empire | The brig was driven ashore and wrecked at Queenstown, County Cork, United Kingdom with the loss of a crew member. Survivors were rescued by the Coast Guard using rocket apparatus. She was on a voyage from Cardiff, Glamorgan, United Kingdom to Malta. |
| HMS Wasp | Royal Navy | HMS Wasp The Archer-class sloop ran aground on a reef in Hango Bay and broke her back. She was later refloated and taken in to Mauritius for repairs. |

== 29 January ==
List of shipwrecks: 29 January 1861
| Ship | State | Description |
|---|---|---|
| Alpha | United Kingdom | The ship was driven ashore in Robin Hood's Bay. She was refloated and resumed her voyage. |
| Amanda | United Kingdom | The ship was driven ashore in Robin Hood's Bay. She was on a voyage from Great Yarmouth, Norfolk to Sunderland, County Durham. She was refloated. |
| Berlin | United States | The full-rigged ship ran aground off "Vinkewisse", Belgium. She was on a voyage from New York to Antwerp, Belgium. |
| Berthine | (flag) France | The barque was destroyed by fire south of Cabo de Santo Augustinho, Brazil. She was on a voyage from Buenos Aires, Argentina to Havre de Grâce, Seine-Inférieure. |
| Catherina | Denmark | The schooner was driven ashore in the Elbe. |
| Dolphin | (United Kingdom of Great Britain and Ireland) Saint Lucia | The schooner was lost in Dauphin Bay. Her crew survived. She was on a voyage from Dauphin Bay to Castries. |
| Eva | United Kingdom | The fishing smack ran aground at Dunmore East, County Waterford. |
| Ferdinand | United Kingdom | The ship ran aground in the River Thames at Purfleet, Essex. She was on a voyage from London to Pernambuco, Brazil. She was refloated. |
| Limerick Lass | United Kingdom | The schooner ran aground on the Swanage Ledge, in the English Channel off the coast of Dorset and was wrecked. Her crew survived. She was on a voyage from Southampton, Hampshire to Newport, Monmouthshire. |
| Maria Charlotte | France | The lugger was driven ashore at "Waldon". She was on a voyage from Caen, Calvados to Dunkirk, Nord. |
| Mary | United Kingdom | The schooner was driven ashore at Flamborough Head, Yorkshire. She was on a voyage from London to Newcastle upon Tyne, Northumberland. She was refloated. |
| Mary | United Kingdom | The brig was driven ashore at Flamborough Head. She was refloated and resumed her voyage. |
| Mellona | (United Kingdom of Great Britain and Ireland) Guernsey | The schooner was driven ashore in Robin Hood's Bay. She was on a voyage from London to South Shields, County Durham. She was refloated. |
| Melrose | United States | The 177-ton sternwheel paddle steamer sank in the Ohio River at Shawneetown, Illinois, after colliding with Pacific (flag unknown). |
| Reine Mathilde | (flag) France | The steamship ran aground and was wrecked at Algiers, Algeria. She was on a voyage from Algiers to Dunkirk, Nord and Antwerp, Belgium. |
| San Giovanni | Kingdom of Sardinia | The ship foundered 3 nautical miles (5.6 km) off Castiglioncello. She was on a voyage from Livorno to Portoferraio, Elba. |
| Tay | United Kingdom | The schooner was driven onto the Boulmer Rocks, on the coast of Northumberland. She was on a voyage from Dundee, Forfarshire to Newcastle upon Tyne. She was refloated the next day. |

== 30 January ==
List of shipwrecks: 30 January 1861
| Ship | State | Description |
|---|---|---|
| Boncalais | France | The full-rigged ship ran aground off Hastings, Sussex, United Kingdom. She was refloated and taken in to Dover, Kent, United Kingdom. |
| Madryn | United Kingdom | The ship ran aground off Hastings. She was on a voyage from Newcastle upon Tyne, Northumberland to Poole, Dorset. She was refloated and resumed her voyage. |
| Matilda | United Kingdom | The brig was driven ashore at Dover. She was on a voyage from London to Saint Helena. She was refloated and taken in to The Downs. |
| Turner | United Kingdom | The sloop sprang a leak and sank off Kirkcaldy, Fife. Her crew were rescued. She was on a voyage from Alloa, Clackmannanshire to Skateraw, Kincardineshire. She subsequently came ashore near Kirkcaldy. |
| Victor Emmanuel | United Kingdom | The barque was wrecked at Blackgang Chine, Isle of Wight with the loss of sixteen of her twenty crew. She was on a voyage from Alexandria, Egypt to London. |

== 31 January ==
List of shipwrecks: 31 January 1861
| Ship | State | Description |
|---|---|---|
| Adler | Bremen | The steamship ran aground in the Weser downstream of Weddewarden. She was on a voyage from London, United Kingdom to Bremen. She was refloated and completed her voyage. |
| Albion | United Kingdom | The schooner was driven ashore at Dungeness, Kent. She was on a voyage from Middlesbrough, Yorkshire to Caen, Calvados, France. She was refloated and taken in to Dover, Kent in a leaky condition. |
| James Gibbs | United Kingdom | The full-rigged ship foundered in the Atlantic Ocean off the coast of County Kerry. Her 21 crew were rescued by a steamship. She was on a voyage from Newport, Monmouthshire to Bermuda. James Gibbs was taken in to Dingle, County Kerry in early February. |
| Possidone | Ottoman Empire | The brig was wrecked on "Conigli Island", off Tenedos. Her crew were rescued. |
| Salacia | United Kingdom | The full-rigged ship ran aground on the Goodwin Sands, Kent. She was on a voyage from Newcastle upon Tyne, Northumberland to Cartagena, Spain. |
| Simpson | Bremen | The steamship ran aground in the Weser downstream of Weddewarden. She was later refloated and taken in to Weddewarden. |
| Spartan | United Kingdom | The ship ran aground at the mouth of the Min River and broke her back. She was on a voyage from Foo Chow Foo, China to London. She was refloated and put back to Foo Chow Foo. |
| Stafette | Prussia | The ship ran aground off Helsingør, Denmark and was damaged. She was on a voyage from Grangemouth, Stirlingshire, United Kingdom to Memel. |

== Unknown date ==
List of shipwrecks: Unknown date 1861
| Ship | State | Description |
|---|---|---|
| Abeona | United Kingdom | The ship was sunk by ice in the Seine before 16 January. She was later refloated and taken in to South Shields, County Durham. |
| Adelaide | United Kingdom | The brigantine was abandoned off Cape St. Francis, Newfoundland, British North America before 7 January. Her crew were rescued. |
| Aghia Barbara | Flag unknown | The ship was wrecked at Sulina, Ottoman Empire. |
| Alfred and Victor | France | The full-rigged ship was wrecked. Three of her crew were rescued by Castro (Flag unknown). Alfred and Victor was on a voyage from Mauritius to Tamatave, Madagascar. |
| America | United Kingdom | The ship was lost off the Yang-taze Cape, China between 8 and 24 January. She was on a voyage from Liverpool, Lancashire to Shanghai, China. |
| Anna Gezina | (Denmark) Duchy of Holstein | The ship was driven ashore at to Landguard Fort, Felixtowe, Suffolk, United Kingdom. She was on a voyage from London, United Kingdom to Glückstadt. She was refloated on 14 January and taken in to Harwich, Essex, United Kingdom. |
| Aurora | United Kingdom | The ship was driven ashore at Étaples, Pas-de-Calais, France. Her crew were rescued. |
| Avondale | United Kingdom | The ship was abandoned in the Atlantic Ocean. |
| Bereldo | Royal Sardinian Navy | The frigate was driven ashore on the coast of Corsica, France. |
| Bothnia | United Kingdom | The steamship was sighted off Helsingør, Denmark whilst on a voyage from Danzig to Kingston upon Hull, Yorkshire. No further trace, presumed foundered with the loss of all 22 crew. |
| British Queen | United Kingdom | The ship was driven ashore at Sully, Glamorgan. She was later refloated and taken in to Cardiff, Glamorgan, where she arrived on 10 January. |
| Caroline | United Kingdom | The ship was run down and sunk off the coast of Cornwall by Eliot (United Kingdom) with the loss of all but one of her crew. |
| Cicely | United Kingdom | The ship foundered in the Atlantic Ocean. She was on a voyage from Tavira, Portugal to Torbay. |
| Clara | Sweden | The ship was driven ashore at Helsingør before 16 January. She was on a voyage from Hartlepool, County Durham, United Kingdom to Malmö. She was refloated and taken in to Helsingør. |
| Condor | United Kingdom | The ship was driven ashore at Poolbeg, County Dublin before 16 January. |
| Courier | United Kingdom | The ship was driven ashore and wrecked at Blakeney, Norfolk. She was on a voyage from Hartlepool to Blakeney. |
| Earl of Lonsdale | United Kingdom | The ship foundered. She was on a voyage from Demerara, British Guiana to the Clyde. |
| Efthunia | Greece | The brig foundered in the Black Sea. She was on a voyage from Brăila, Ottoman Empire to Marseille, Bouches-du-Rhône, France. |
| Enesto Ease | Flag unknown | The ship was driven ashore on the French coast. |
| Evangeline | United Kingdom | The ship ran aground in the Hooghly River before 8 January. SHe was refloated. |
| Evanghelistra | Ottoman Empire | The ship was driven ashore at Odesa. |
| Fantome | (United Kingdom of Great Britain and Ireland) New Zealand | The schooner left Lyttelton Harbour for Wellington on 7 January and was not seen again. She is likely to have foundered in the same storm which claimed the Shamrock (qv). |
| Harry Herbert | United Kingdom | The schooner sank off the Mumbles, Glamorgan. She was refloated on 11 January and taken in tow for Liverpool, where she was to be repaired. |
| Hawthorn | United Kingdom | The brig ran aground on the Dotwick Sand, off the coast of County Durham and sank. |
| Hercules | United Kingdom | The ship was abandoned. |
| Isabella Davidson | United Kingdom | The schooner was driven ashore at Wexford. She was on a voyage from Falmouth, Cornwall to Troon, Ayrshire. She was later refloated and taken in to Wexford. |
| Jeune Alexandre | France | The ship sprang a leak and was beached at Paimbœuf, Loire-Inférieure before 6 January. |
| Johanna Roostjee | Grand Duchy of Oldenburg | The barque was driven ashore and wrecked at Hampstead, New York, United States. She was on a voyage from Newcastle upon Tyne, Northumberland, United Kingdom to New York City, United States. |
| John Owens | (United Kingdom of Great Britain and Ireland) British North America | The ship was abandoned in the Atlantic Ocean before 12 January. Her crew were rescued. she was on a voyage from Callao, Peru to Queenstown, County Cork. |
| Joseph Howe | United Kingdom | The ship foundered off the Isles of Scilly before 7 January. Her crew were rescued by Indus (United Kingdom). She was on a voyage from Cardiff, Glamorgan to Loando, Portuguese West Africa. |
| Lord Teignmouth | United Kingdom | The brig foundered off Coquet Island, Northumberland. Her crew survived. She was on a voyage from South Shields, County Durham to Lowestoft, Suffolk. |
| Lorenza | Austrian Empire | The barque was wrecked in the Dampier Strait, Netherlands East Indies before 15 January. Her crew were rescued. |
| Louis | France | The ship was lost on the French coast. |
| Louise and Charlotte | Russia | The brig was driven ashore at Gravelines, Nord, France. She was refloated on 22 January and taken in to Dunkirk, Nord for repairs. |
| Loyal | United Kingdom | The ship was wrecked on "Bintang Island" before 18 January. |
| Lunan | United Kingdom | The barque was abandoned in the Atlantic Ocean before 24 January. |
| Marthaja | Norway | The barque was driven ashore in the Dardanelles. She was on a voyage from Odesa to Antwerp. She was refloated on 7 January. |
| Mary | United Kingdom | The barque was driven ashore at Gibraltar. |
| Maximilian | Austrian Empire | The ship was driven ashore on Elba, Kingdom of Sardinia before 10 January. She was on a voyage from "Brassa" to Venice, Kingdom of Lombardy–Venetia. |
| Mersey | United Kingdom | The 219-ton Brixham brig was wrecked on the beach at Porthleven, Cornwall. |
| Meshout | Ottoman Empire | The brig was wrecked at Benghazi, Ottoman Tripolitania before 16 January. Her crew were rescued. |
| Nea Tichi | Ottoman Empire | The ship was lost. |
| Nelly | Austrian Empire | The ship foundered off Capraia, Kingdom of Sardinia before 10 January. |
| Nordby | Norway | The brig foundered. Her crew survived. She was on a voyage from Sunderland, County Durham, United Kingdom to Christiania. |
| Orion | United States | The ship ran aground in the Hooghly River. She was on a voyage from Liverpool to Calcutta, India. Orion was refloated and taken in to Calcutta, where she arrived on 3 January She was declared a total loss. |
| Pescadora | Spain | The ship was wrecked at Barossa, Portugal. She was on a voyage from Buenos Aires, Argentina to Cádiz. |
| Philinci | Belgium | The ship was wrecked in the Black Sea with the loss of all but two of her crew. She was on a voyage from Brǎila to Antwerp. |
| Phœbe | United Kingdom | The ship sank at "Sarkfort". |
| Ross | United Kingdom | The ship was abandoned in the Atlantic Ocean before 7 January. Her crew were rescued. She was on a voyage from Montreal, Province of Canada, British North America to Liverpool. |
| Samaritan | United Kingdom | The ship was driven ashore on the French coast. |
| Siam | (United Kingdom of Great Britain and Ireland) British North America | The ship was abandoned in the Atlantic Ocean before 20 January. |
| San Nicola | Greece | The ship collided with the steamship Baristini (Flag unknown) and sank in the Sea of Marmora before 3 January. |
| Sophie | France | The schooner was damaged by fire at the Île d'Yeu, Vendée. She was on a voyage from Les Sables-d'Olonne, Vendée to Nantes, Loire-Inférieure. |
| Star of the Sea | United Kingdom | The schooner was driven ashore at Roquetas de Mar, Spain. She was on a voyage from Palermo, Sicily to Belfast, County Antrim. She was refloated on 9 January and taken in to Almería, Spain. |
| Storfursten | United Kingdom | The schooner sprang a leak and sank in the North Sea. Her crew were rescued by a Norwegian brig. |
| Sultan | United Kingdom | The ship was driven ashore on Great Cumbrae, Ayrshire. She was on a voyage from the Clyde to Santos, Brazil. She was refloated and towed in to Rothesay, Isle of Bute. |
| Thetis | United Kingdom | The schooner was driven ashore at Cardigan. She was refloated. |
| Thomas Hodgson | United Kingdom | The ship foundered in the Grand Banks of Newfoundland. Her crew were rescued by Alert (United Kingdom). |
| Tres Amigos | Flag unknown | The ship was driven ashore at Syra, Greece before 30 January. Her crew were rescued. She was on a voyage from Odesa to Queenstown, County Cork, United Kingdom. |
| Twee Gebroeders | Netherlands | The ship sank off Vlieland, Friesland. Her crew were rescued. She was on a voyage from Newcastle upon Tyne to Harlingen, Friesland. |
| Wesley | United Kingdom | The steamship was sighted off Helsingør in early January whilst on a voyage from Hull to Copenhagen, Denmark. No further trace, presumed foundered with the loss of all hands. |
| Westfold | United Kingdom | The ship became waterlogged. She was on a voyage from Newcastle upon Tyne to Messina, Sicily, Italy. |
| Wredan | Austrian Empire | The brig was driven ashore and wrecked at Queenstown, County Cork before 28 January. She was on a voyage from Cardiff, Glamorgan, United Kingdom to Malta. |
| Wiikingen | Flag unknown | The ship foundered. |
