= Cèze =

French tributary of the Rhône

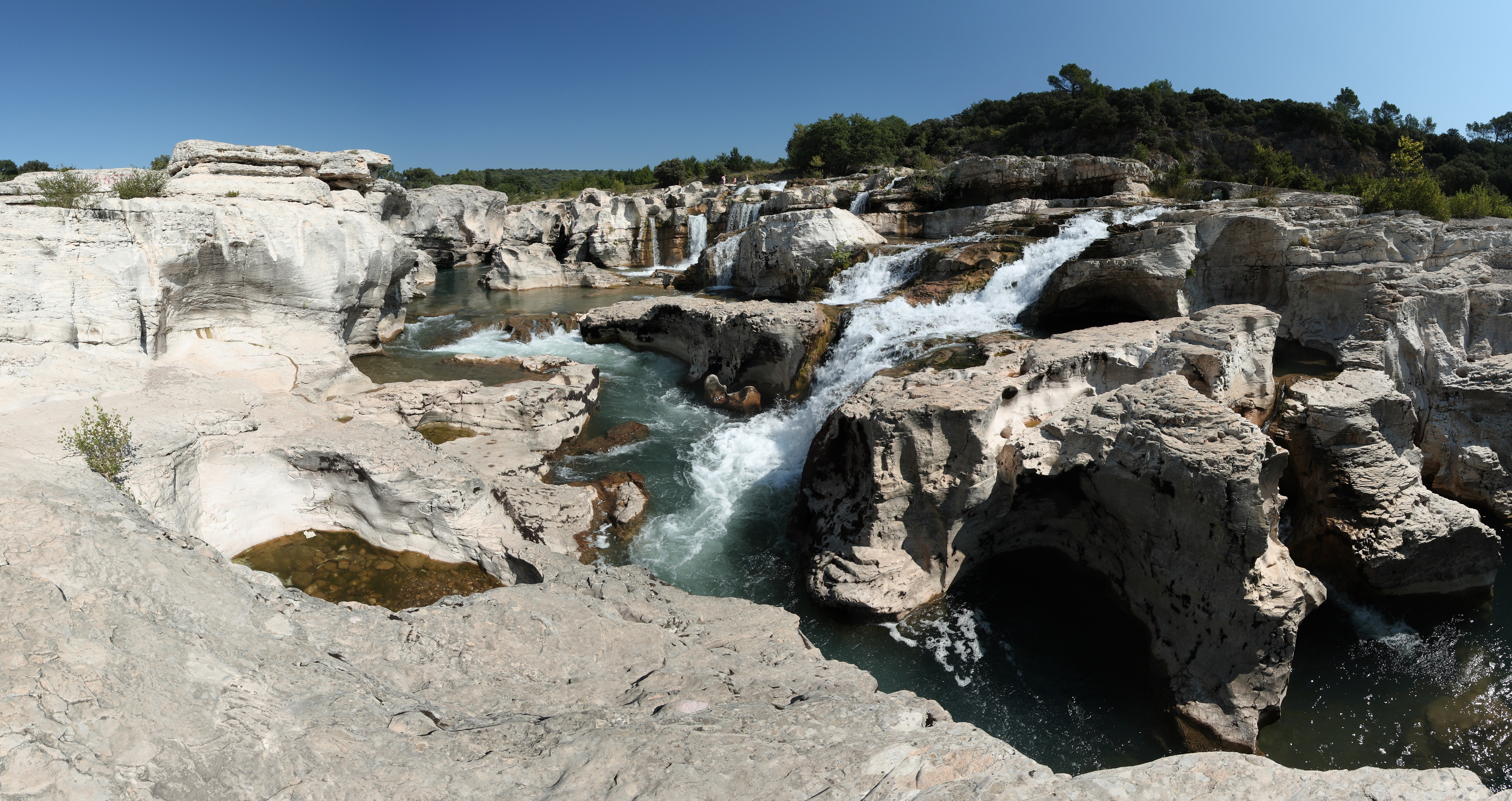
- Sautadet Rapids at La Roque-sur-Cèze

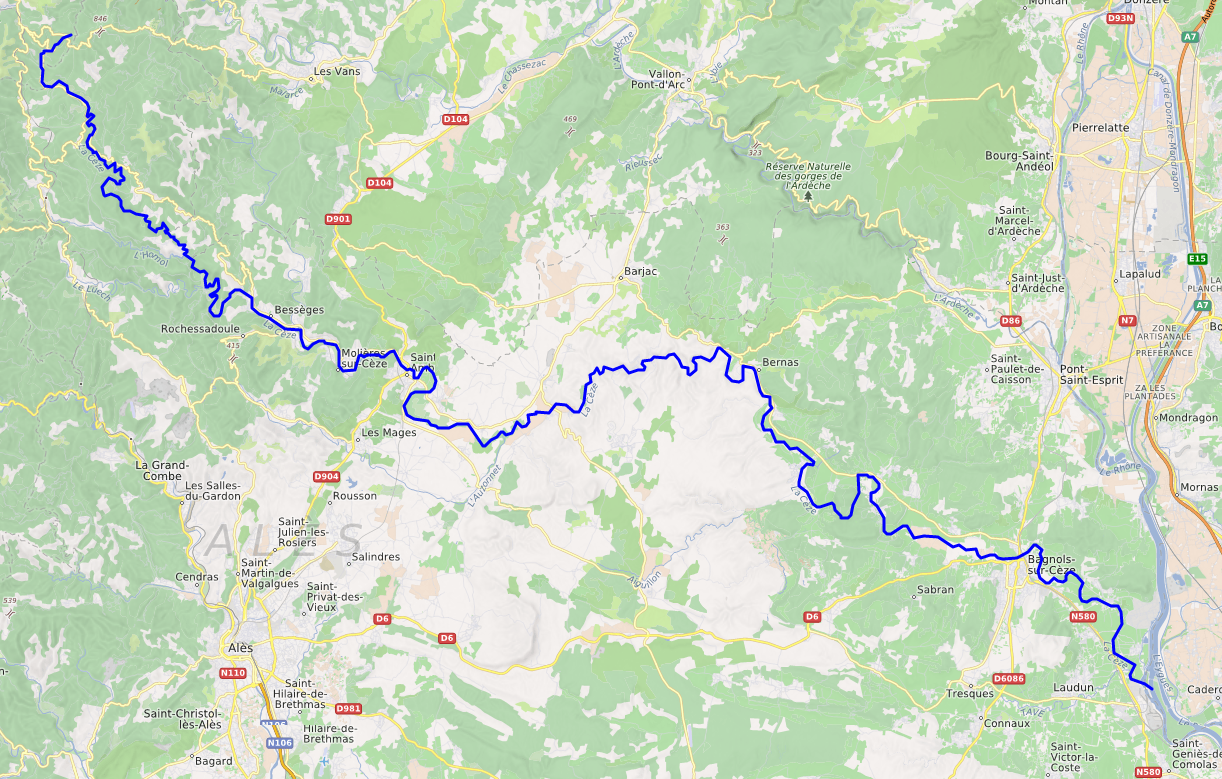

Location
- Country: France

Physical characteristics
- Source
  - location: Cévennes
- Mouth
  - location: Rhône
  - coordinates: 44°6′30″N 4°42′13″E
- Length: 128 km (80 mi)
- Basin size: 1,360 km^{2} (530 mi^{2})
- Discharge
  - average: 22 m^{3}/s (780 cu ft/s)

Basin features
- Progression: Rhône→ Mediterranean Sea

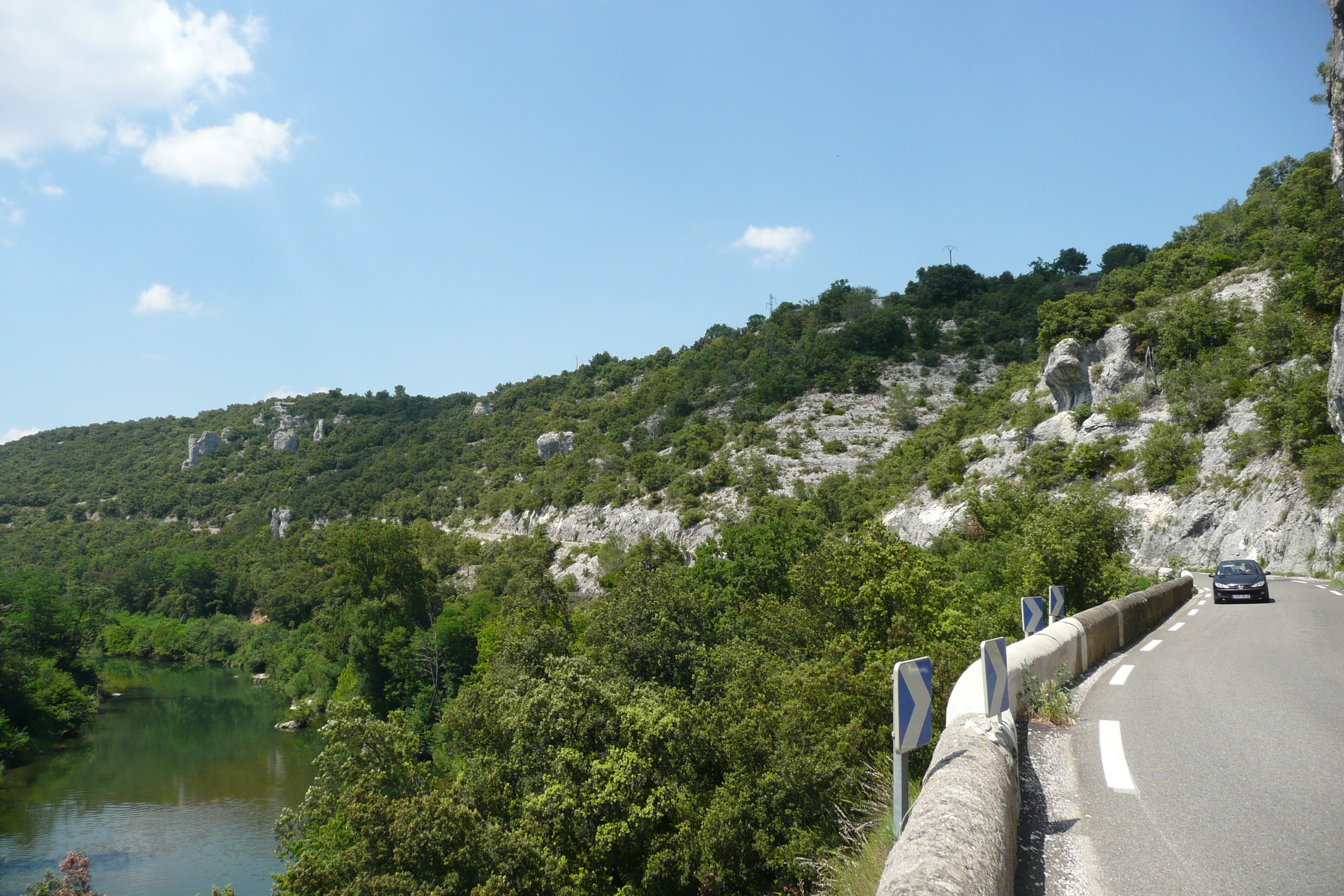
The river by Montclus (Gard)

The Cèze (French pronunciation: [sɛz]; Occitan: Céser) is a karstic French river, a right tributary of the Rhône. It runs through the departments of Lozère and Gard in the Occitanie region. It is 128 km (80 mi) long, and its basin area is 1,360 km^{2} (530 sq mi). Its source is in the Cévennes mountains, near Saint-André-Capcèze. It flows through Bessèges, Saint-Ambroix, Bagnols-sur-Cèze, and it flows into the Rhône at Codolet, southwest of Orange.

Its longest tributaries are the Luech, Auzon, Tave, Ganière and Aiguillon.

In the dry season, the Cèze sometimes dries up.
