= La Faute-sur-Mer =

- Part of L'Aiguillon-la-Presqu'île
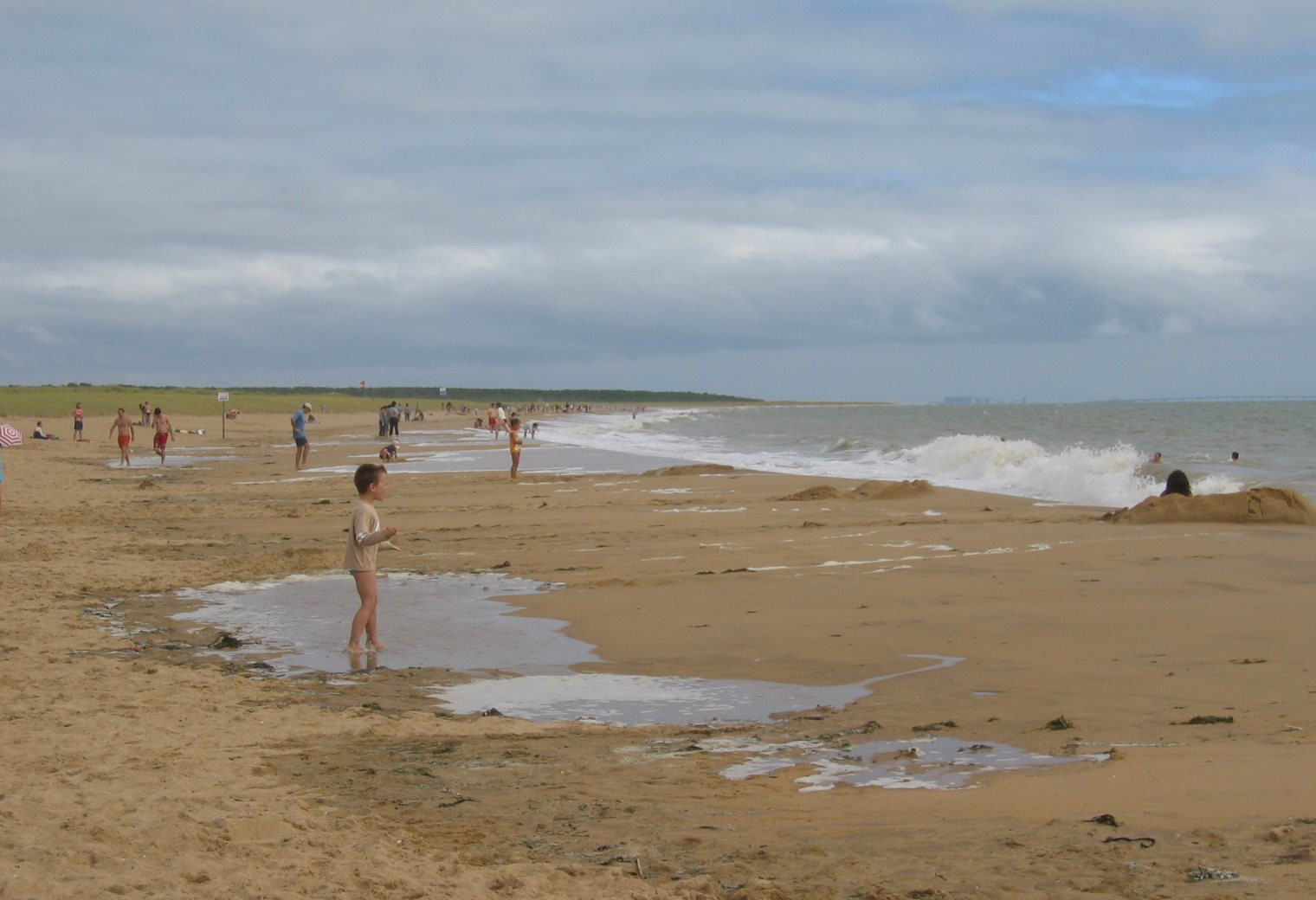
- The beach at La Faute-sur-Mer

- Coat of arms
- Location of La Faute-sur-Mer
- Location within France Location within Pays de la Loire
- Coordinates: 46°19′58″N 1°19′17″W
- Country: France
- Region: Pays de la Loire
- Department: Vendée
- Arrondissement: Les Sables-d'Olonne
- Canton: Mareuil-sur-Lay-Dissais
- Commune: L'Aiguillon-la-Presqu'île
- Area^{1}: 6.94 km^{2} (2.68 sq mi)
- Highest elevation: 17 m (56 ft)
- Lowest elevation: 0 m (0 ft)
- Population (2022): 724
  - Density: 104/km^{2} (270/sq mi)
- Time zone: UTC+01:00 (CET)
  - Summer (DST): UTC+02:00 (CEST)
- Postal code: 85460
- ^{1} French Land Register data, which excludes lakes, ponds, glaciers > 1 km^{2} (0.386 sq mi or 247 acres) and river estuaries.

La Faute-sur-Mer (French pronunciation: [la fot syʁ mɛʁ], literally La Faute on Sea) is a former commune in the Vendée department in the Pays de la Loire region in western France. It was merged with L'Aiguillon-sur-Mer to form L'Aiguillon-la-Presqu'île on 1 January 2022.

== Geography ==
The river Lay forms all of the commune's eastern border, then flows into the Atlantic Ocean, which forms all of its western border.

== See also ==
- Communes of the Vendée department
