= Aiguillon (Cèze) =

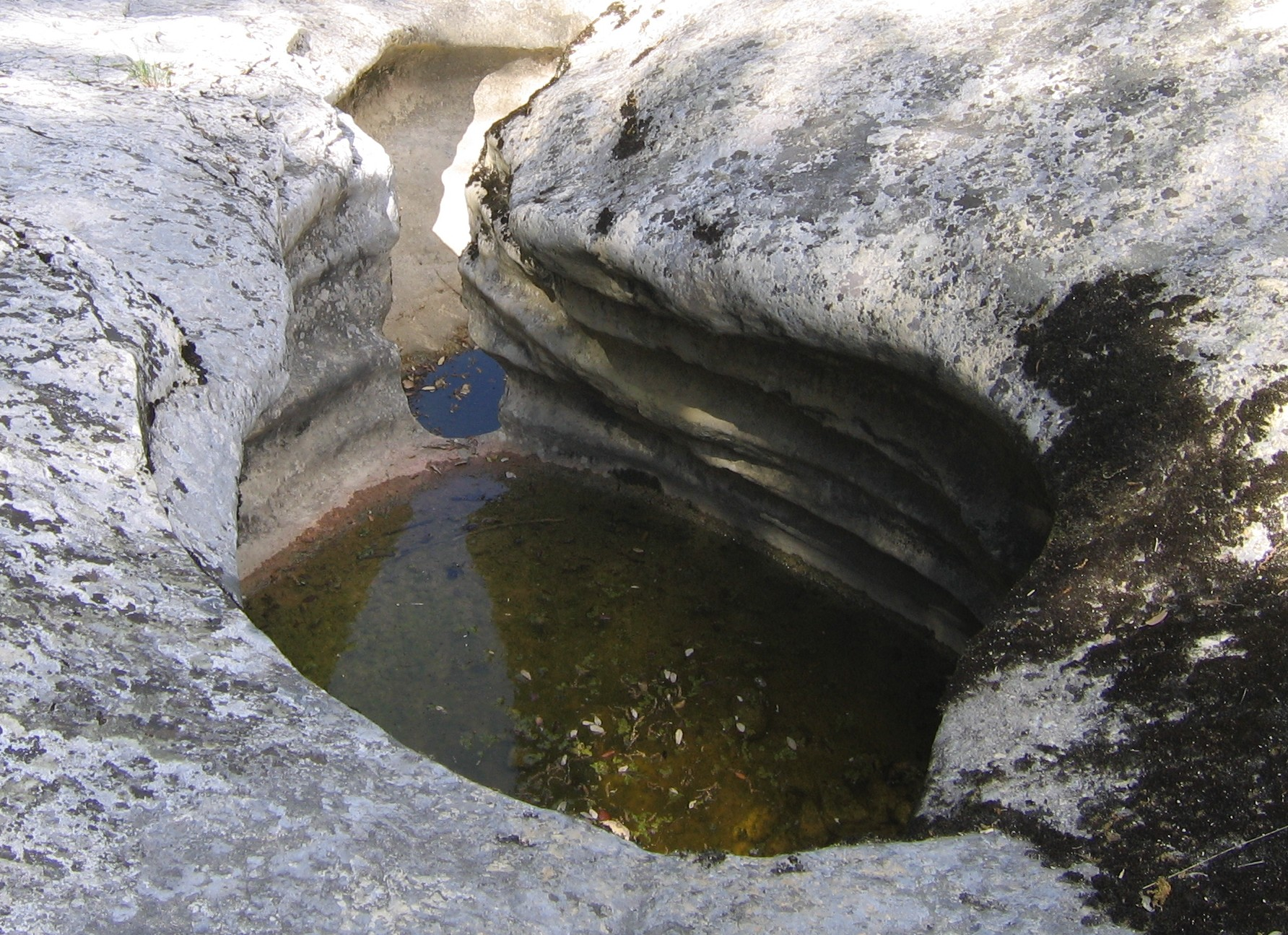
- Rock formation in Les Concluses

- Location within France Location within Occitanie

Location
- Country: France

Physical characteristics
- Source
  - location: Cévennes
  - coordinates: 44°08′54″N 4°18′52″E
- Mouth
  - location: Cèze
  - coordinates: 44°11′42″N 4°29′02″E
- Length: 22 km (14 mi)

Basin features
- Progression: Cèze→ Rhône→ Mediterranean Sea

The Aiguillon (French pronunciation: [ɛɡɥijɔ̃]) is a river in southern France, a tributary of the Cèze. It is 22 km (14 mi) long. It is the departments of Gard, in the Occitanie region. The source of the Aiguillon is on Mont Bouquet, west of Lussan. It flows through Lussan, Les Concluses, Goussargues where it joined by the Merderis and it flows into the Cèze upstream of La Roque-sur-Cèze.

== Les Concluses ==
The Aiguillon goes dry during the summer, but has carved out a rocky gorge called Les Concluses on the limestone plateau. From a viewpoint high above, the gorge is riddled with deep geological structures known as marmites des géants (potholes). In summer it is popular with walkers, who follow the water course under the steeply overhanging limestone valley sides. The walls of the gorge have many climbing routes of an average 8a difficulty. Similarly, the walls of the valley contain many caves and potholes. The largest one is the "Baume du Biou," or the Grotto of the Ox.
