= 1918 Aiguillon =

Dark main-belt asteroid

Discovery
- Discovered by: G. Soulié
- Discovery site: Bordeaux Obs.
- Discovery date: 19 October 1968

Designations
- Named after: Aiguillon (French town)
- Alternative designations: 1968 UA
- Minor planet category: main-belt · (outer)

Orbital characteristics
- Epoch 4 September 2017 (JD 2458000.5)
- Uncertainty parameter 0
- Observation arc: 62.93 yr (22,985 days)
- Aphelion: 3.6118 AU
- Perihelion: 2.7755 AU
- Semi-major axis: 3.1936 AU
- Eccentricity: 0.1309
- Orbital period (sidereal): 5.71 yr (2,085 days)
- Mean anomaly: 145.64°
- Inclination: 9.1961°
- Longitude of ascending node: 195.12°
- Argument of perihelion: 245.30°

Physical characteristics
- Dimensions: 19.536±0.090 km 20±8 km (generic)
- Geometric albedo: 0.062±0.012
- Absolute magnitude (H): 11.7

1918 Aiguillon (provisional designation 1968 UA), is a dark asteroid from the outer region of the asteroid belt, approximately 20 kilometers in diameter.

It was discovered by French astronomer Guy Soulié at Bordeaux Observatory, France, on 19 October 1968. The asteroid was named for the French town of Aiguillon.

== Orbit and classification ==
Aiguillon orbits the Sun in the outer main-belt at a distance of 2.8–3.6 AU once every 5 years and 9 months (2,085 days). Its orbit has an eccentricity of 0.13 and an inclination of 9° with respect to the ecliptic. The first observation was a precovery taken at Palomar Observatory in 1954, extending the body's observation arc by 14 years prior to its official discovery observation.

== Physical characteristics ==
According to the survey carried out by NASA's Wide-field Infrared Survey Explorer with its subsequent NEOWISE mission, Aiguillon measures 19.5 kilometers in diameter, and its surface has an albedo of 0.062.

Based on a generic magnitude-diameter conversion, the body measures between 12 and 28 kilometers, for an albedo in the range of 0.05 to 0.25 and an absolute magnitude of 11.7. As of 2017, Aiguillon's composition, rotation period and shape remain unknown.

== Naming ==
This minor planet was named for the discoverer's birthplace, Aiguillon, a small town on the Garonne river in France. The approved naming citation was published by the Minor Planet Center on 1 December 1979 (M.P.C. 5038).
