= SS Anna Paulowna =

Dutch steamship (1857–1876)

History

Netherlands
- Name: Anna Paulowna
- Owner: Koninklijke Nederlandse Stoomboot-Maatschappij (KNSM)
- Builder: William Denny and Brothers, Dumbarton
- Cost: 12,294 GBP
- Yard number: 65
- Launched: 7 April 1857
- Completed: 1857

United Kingdom
- Acquired: 1861
- Renamed: Enterprise

Netherlands
- Owner: Koninklijke Nederlandse Stoomboot-Maatschappij (KNSM)
- Acquired: 18 November 1861
- Out of service: 1 December 1876
- Renamed: Anna Paulowna
- Fate: wrecked at Terschelling, the Netherland on 1 December 1876

General characteristics
- Tonnage: 518.05 GRT, 473 BRT
- Length: 194.6 Feet
- Beam: 25.2 Feet
- Depth: 13.8 Feet
- Installed power: 60 n.h.p. / 300 IHP
- Sail plan: three masts
- Speed: 8 knots
- Capacity: One 2-cylinder compound steam engine, single shaft, 1 screw, 3 masts

SS Anna Paulowna was a 1857 built 63 metres long Dutch steamship. It was owned by Koninklijke Nederlandse Stoomboot-Maatschappij (KNSM) and had hometown Amsterdam.

On 1 December 1876 the ship was driven ashore and wrecked on Terschelling, the Netherlands. The crew members were rescued.

== Ship details ==
The ship had an iron hull, and was 60 metres long and measured 63m x 8m. She weighed 518.05 GRT and 473 BRT. The ship had one 2-cylinder compound steam engine a single shaft, one screw and three masts.

When the ship sank in 1876, she had a tandem compound engine. It is not known whether this was the original machine, "compounded" or a completely new machine. It's also not known when a change of machine took place.

== History ==
The ship was built by William Denny and Brothers and costed 12,294 GBP. She was launched on 7 April 1857. In November 1859 she was on voyage from Baltiysk, Russia to Amsterdam. In Gdańsk, Poland the ship was checked and on 24 November 1859 it was found that the shaft and cylinder were broken. The repair would take up to four weeks.

=== 1861 accident ===
In January 1861 the ship with captain P.D.H.D. de Haan was on a voyage from Amsterdam, North Holland to Marseille, Bouches-du-Rhône, France, and Genoa, Kingdom of Sardinia. During the night of 15 January 1861 the ship was driven ashore and wrecked at Cape Spartel, Morocco with the loss of six of her 22 crew. Cargo of the ship was unloaded.

British salvagers managed to refloat the ship and the ship was sold to England where it entered service under the name Enterprise. In November 1861 the KNSM bought the ship back and came back into service as Anna Paulowna.

=== 1864-1875 damage ===
On 29 April 1864 after departing on a voyage from Amsterdam, the Netherlands to Liverpool, United Kingdom, returned to Oosterdok, Amsterdam with propeller damage. On 25 September 1867 the ship arrived from Amsterdam at the harbor of Frederikshavn, Denmark with a broken spindle and cylinder. On 22 September 1875 while on voyage from Saint Petersburg, Russia to the Netherlands it broke the machine at Ven and brought in by a tugboat at Copenhagen where it was repaired.

=== 1876 fate ===
On 1 December 1876, while en route from Pernau to Schiedam, the Netherlands, the ship with a cargo of barley stranded near Terschelling partly due to fog. The ship also had the rescued crew of the Belgian SS Deloye Matthieu on board. Part of the cargo was thrown overboard in an attempt to refloat the ship, but this didn't work out. Thirteen crew members and passengers were brought ashore on Terschelling by a fishing vessel. The captain and mates followed later with a pilot boat.

=== Auction ===
The next year, on 20 August 1877 a public sale took place at Terschelling of the wreck and its cargo.

== Wreck dives ==
In the early 1980s the wreck was re-discovered by divers from Terschelling. There was little left of the hull. In the middle was a small steam boiler with the 2-cylinder compound steam engine. At the rear was the 20 meter long propeller shaft running through the sand that ended at a small iron propeller. In 2014 it was discovered that the ship had a tandem compound engine; so a different engine to the original installed in 1857.
