= L'Aiguillon-la-Presqu'île =

- Commune
- Location of L'Aiguillon-la-Presqu'île
- Location within France Location within Pays de la Loire
- Coordinates: 46°20′03″N 1°18′10″W
- Country: France
- Region: Pays de la Loire
- Department: Vendée
- Arrondissement: Fontenay-le-Comte and Les Sables-d'Olonne
- Canton: Mareuil-sur-Lay-Dissais
- Intercommunality: Sud-Vendée-Littoral

Government
  - Mayor (2022–2026): Laurent Huger
- Area^{1}: 15.68 km^{2} (6.05 sq mi)
- Highest elevation: 17 m (56 ft)
- Lowest elevation: −2 m (−6.6 ft)
- Population (2023): 2,845
  - Density: 181.4/km^{2} (469.9/sq mi)
- Time zone: UTC+01:00 (CET)
  - Summer (DST): UTC+02:00 (CEST)
- INSEE/Postal code: 85001 /85460
- ^{1} French Land Register data, which excludes lakes, ponds, glaciers > 1 km^{2} (0.386 sq mi or 247 acres) and river estuaries.

L'Aiguillon-la-Presqu'île (French pronunciation: [lɛɡɥijɔ̃ la pʁɛskil]) is a commune in the Vendée department in western France. It was established on 1 January 2022 from the amalgamation of the communes of L'Aiguillon-sur-Mer and La Faute-sur-Mer.

== Population ==
Population data refer to the area corresponding with the commune as of January 2025.

Historical population
Year	Pop.	±% p.a.
1968	1,951	—
1975	2,117	+1.17%
1982	2,152	+0.23%
1990	2,175	+0.13%
1999	2,206	+0.16%
2007	2,293	+0.48%
2012	2,214	−0.70%
2017	2,081	−1.23%
2023	2,845	+5.35%
Source: INSEE

== See also ==
- Communes of the Vendée department
