= L'Aiguillon-sur-Mer =

- Part of L'Aiguillon-la-Presqu'île
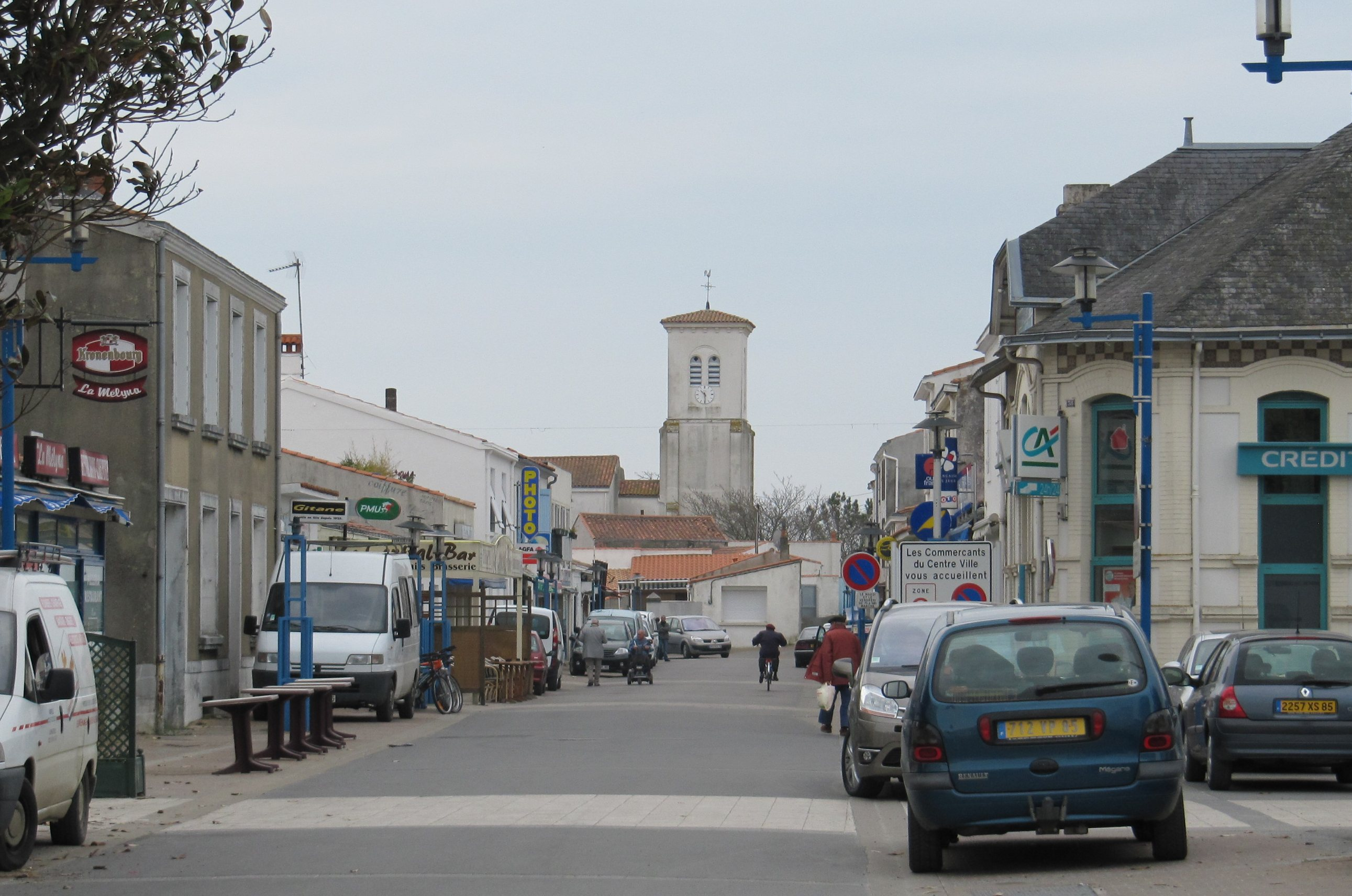
- Town center and commercial district

- Coat of arms
- Location of L'Aiguillon-sur-Mer
- Location within France Location within Pays de la Loire
- Coordinates: 46°20′N 1°18′W
- Country: France
- Region: Pays de la Loire
- Department: Vendée
- Arrondissement: Fontenay-le-Comte
- Canton: Mareuil-sur-Lay-Dissais
- Commune: L'Aiguillon-la-Presqu'île
- Area^{1}: 8.74 km^{2} (3.37 sq mi)
- Elevation: 6 m (20 ft)
- Highest elevation: 8 m (26 ft)
- Lowest elevation: 0 m (0 ft)
- Population (2021): 2,050
  - Density: 235/km^{2} (607/sq mi)
- Time zone: UTC+01:00 (CET)
  - Summer (DST): UTC+02:00 (CEST)
- Postal code: 85460
- ^{1} French Land Register data, which excludes lakes, ponds, glaciers > 1 km^{2} (0.386 sq mi or 247 acres) and river estuaries.

L'Aiguillon-sur-Mer (French pronunciation: [lɛɡɥijɔ̃ syʁ mɛʁ], literally L'Aiguillon on Sea) is a former commune in the Vendée department in western France. It was merged with La Faute-sur-Mer to form L'Aiguillon-la-Presqu'île on 1 January 2022.

== Population ==
Historical population
Year	Pop.	±% p.a.
1962	1,763	—
1968	1,951	+1.70%
1975	2,117	+1.17%
1982	2,152	+0.23%
1990	2,175	+0.13%
1999	2,206	+0.16%
2010	2,312	+0.43%
2015	2,121	−1.71%
2021	2,050	−0.57%
Source: EHESS and INSEE (2010-2021)

== Geography ==
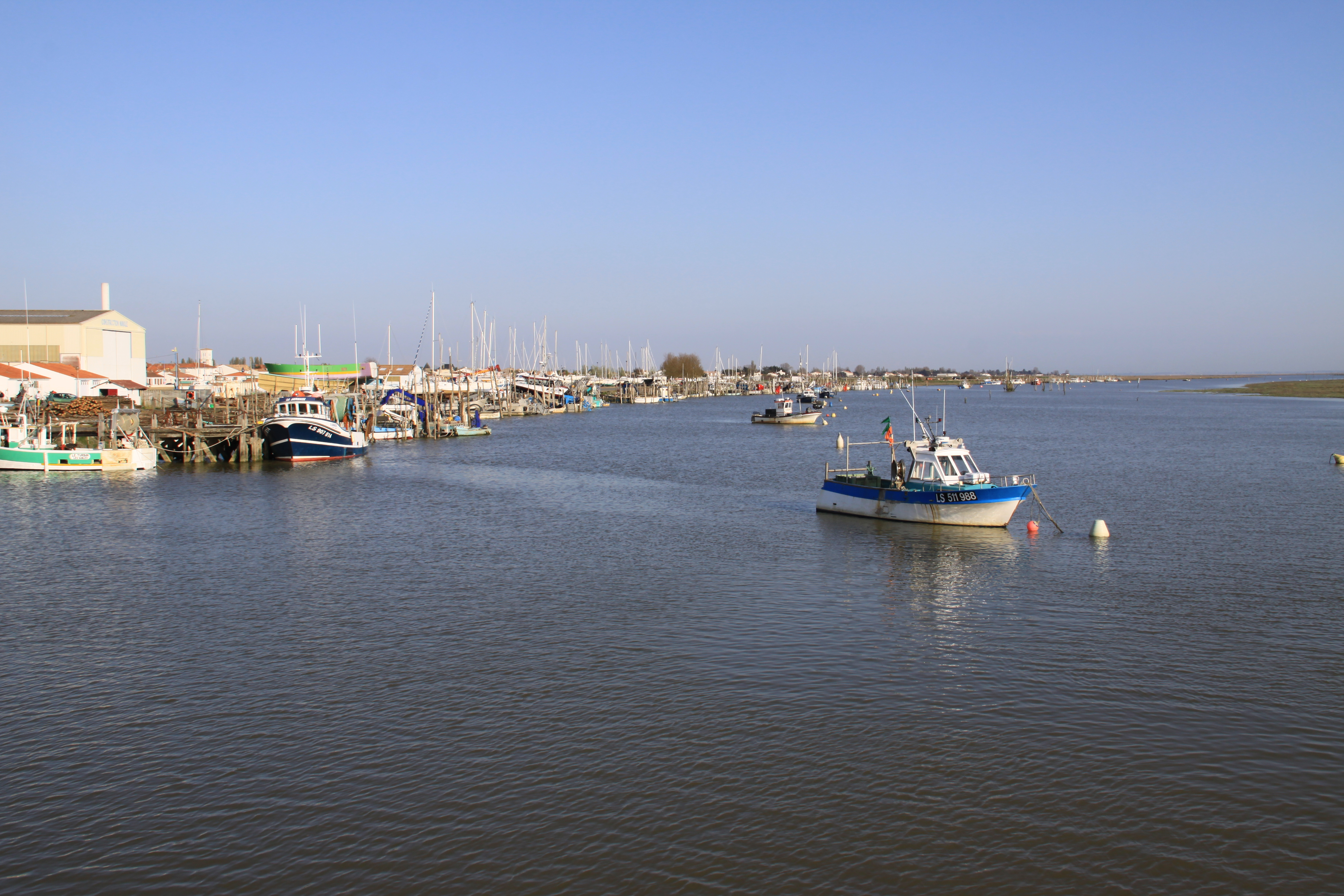
The port of Aiguillon-sur-Mer, located in the estuary of the Lay River

The river Lay forms all of the commune's northwestern border, then flows into the Atlantic Ocean, which forms all of its western border.

== See also ==
- Communes of the Vendée department
