= Rasteau AOC =

- Wine region
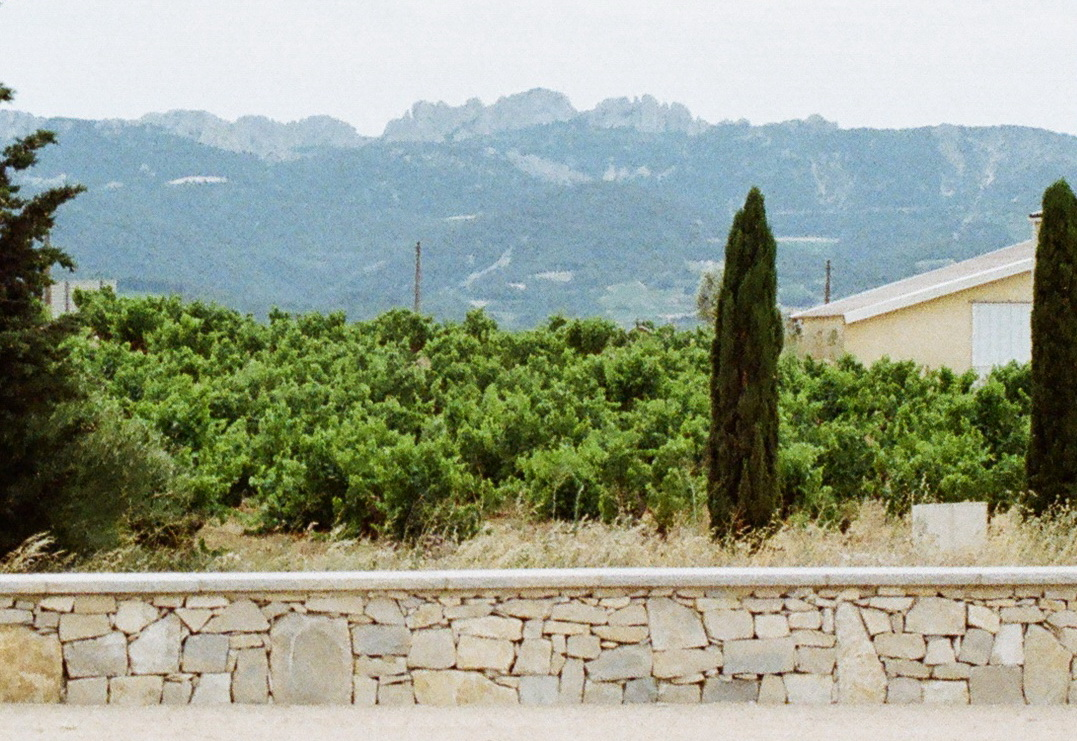
- Type: Appellation d'origine contrôlée
- Country: France
- Part of: Southern Rhone
- Other regions in Southern Rhone: Beaumes de Venise, Vinsobres
- Sub-regions: Rasteau, Orange, Courthezon, Bedarrides, Sorgues
- Climate region: Mediterranean climate
- Soil conditions: Pebbles, sand and marl in the north, quaternary terraces with galets roulés in the south
- Grapes produced: Grenache, Syrah, Mourvedre, Picpoul, Terret noir, Counoise, Muscardin, Vaccarese, Picardan, Cinsault, Clairette, Roussanne, Bourboulenc

Rasteau is an Appellation d'Origine Contrôlée for wine in the southern Rhône wine region of France, covering both fortified and unfortified wines. The sweet fortified wines (Vin Doux Naturel, VDN) can be red, rosé or white, and have long been produced under the Rasteau AOC. In 2010 dry red wines (unfortified) were also added to the appellation, effective from the 2009 vintage. 97% of production is now the unfortified red wines.

The Rasteau appellation covers mostly the commune of Rasteau, but also includes some vineyards in Cairanne and Sablet. 47 hectares (120 acres) of vineyards are used for the fortified wines, with an annual production of around 1,400 hectoliter, or around 190,000 bottles.

== History ==
The production of fortified wine was introduced in 1934, and in 1944, the Rasteau AOC for VDN wines was created, with effect from the 1943 vintage.

Dry red wines from the same area traditionally had to be sold under the Côtes du Rhône Villages designation. From 1996, Rasteau was one of the village names that could be added to Côtes du Rhône Villages. In 2002, the Rasteau winegrower's syndicate requested that Rasteau should become its own appellation. This was finally approved by INAO in 2010, effective from the 2009 vintage.

== Grape varieties ==
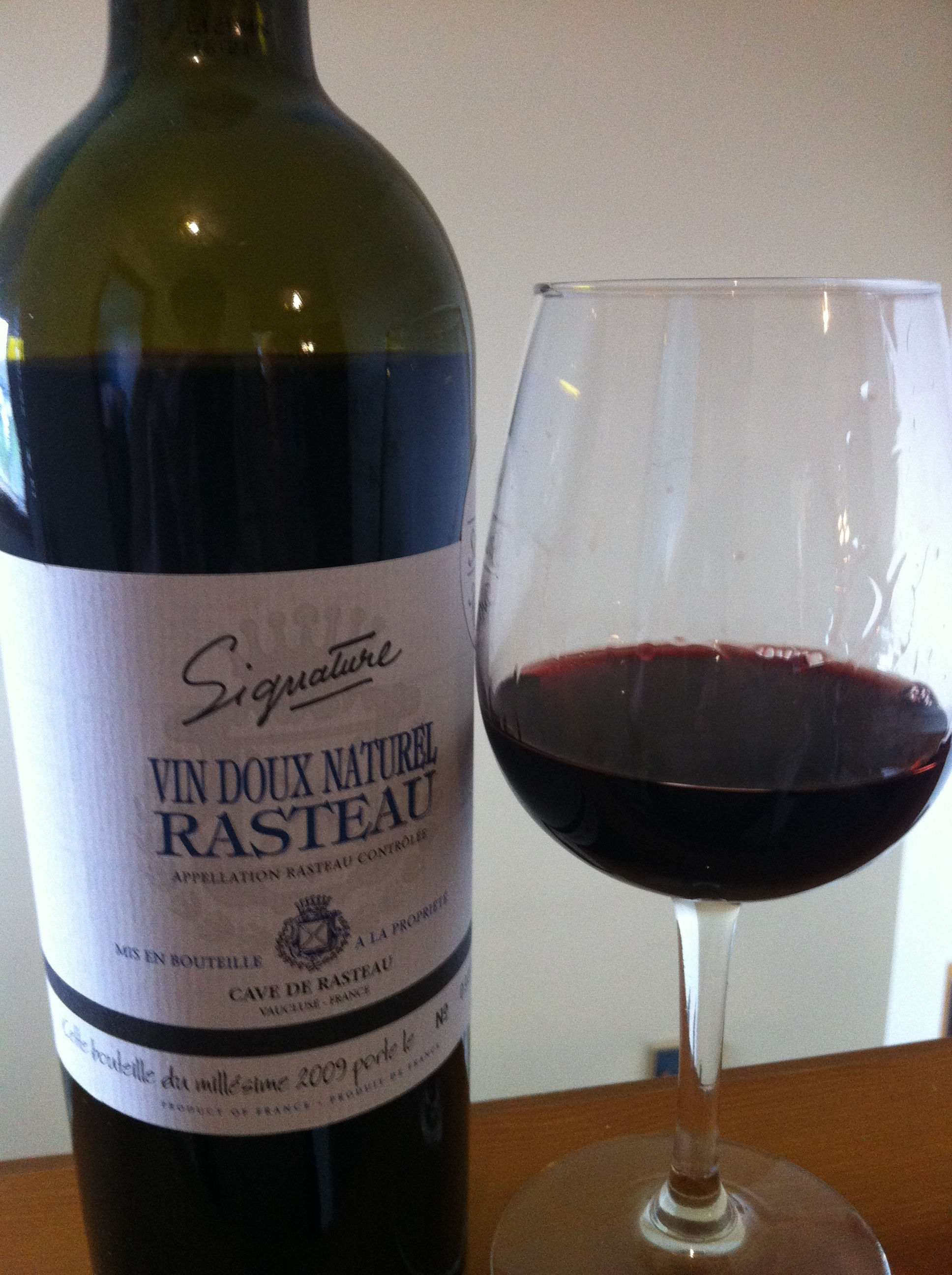
A vin doux naturel from Rasteau made from Grenache

Main grape varieties for the fortified wines are Grenache noir, Grenache gris and Grenache blanc.

All grape varieties allowed for red, rosé or white Côtes du Rhône are also allowed as accessory grape varieties for Rasteau AOC, with the exception of caladoc, couston and marselan, giving 20 permitted varieties in total.

== Appellation regulations ==
=== Fortified VDN wines ===
The fortified wines are produced from grapes which must reach a maturity of at least 252 grams sugar per liter must, or close to 15 per cent of potential alcohol, which corresponds to very mature grapes. The allowed base yield is 30 hectoliter per hectare. The wine must be fortified by the addition of neutral alcohol (with a minimum strength of 96 per cent by volume), the volume of which must correspond to 5 to 10 per cent of the volume of the grape must. The alcohol level of the finished wine must be at least 15 per cent, and a maximum of 21.5 per cent by volume, and the sugar content at least 45 grams per liter. Yields should be below 30 hectolitres per hectare.–

There are two special designations which can be used for Rasteau wines:

- Wines marked Hors d'âge must be stored for five years before it is sold.
- Wines marked Rancio must have been subjected to the typical oxidative treatment of that wine style.

=== Unfortified red wines ===
For unfortified wines, only grenache-based reds can be made under the Rasteau AOC label. All but the smallest producers must follow the following varietal rules:

- at least 50% must be grenache noir (the "principal varietal");
- at least 20% must be syrah and/or mourvèdre (the "complementary varietals"), either alone or in combination;
- carignan and cinsaut to be a maximum of 15% each, and a maximum of 20% together;
- a maximum of 15% in total of the other permitted grapes (the "accessory varietals");
- a maximum of 5% of white wine grapes (which would also be included in the 15% cap on "accessory varietals", above).

Yields should be below 38 hectolitres per hectare.

The table below shows the differences between the Rasteau AOC, the Côtes du Rhône Villages AOC (which Rasteau was part of until 2010) and the generic Côtes du Rhône AOC. As can be seen, Rasteau AOC wines require a lower yield (which should give a higher quality), a higher minimum percentage of grenache noir (although it is usual for southern Rhône wines to have significantly more grenache than the minimum), and a lower proportion of the minor varieties (unless carignan and/or cinsault are included).

Comparison of relevant AOC regulations
	Rasteau AOC	Côtes du Rhône Villages AOC	Côtes du Rhône AOC
Grenache noir	50% min.	40% min.	30%
Syrah & Mourvèdre	20% min. total	25% min. total	20% min. total
Grenache, Syrah & Mourvèdre	70% min. total	80% min. total	70% min. total
Carignan & Cinsaut	15% max. each 20% max. total	within "accessories"	within "accessories"
Other "accessories"	15% max.	20% max.	30% max.
White wine grapes	5% max.	5% max.	5% max.
Caladoc, Couston and Marselan	not permitted	not permitted	10% max. total
Maximum yield	38	44	51
