= Côtes du Rhône AOC =

French wine appellation

- Wine region
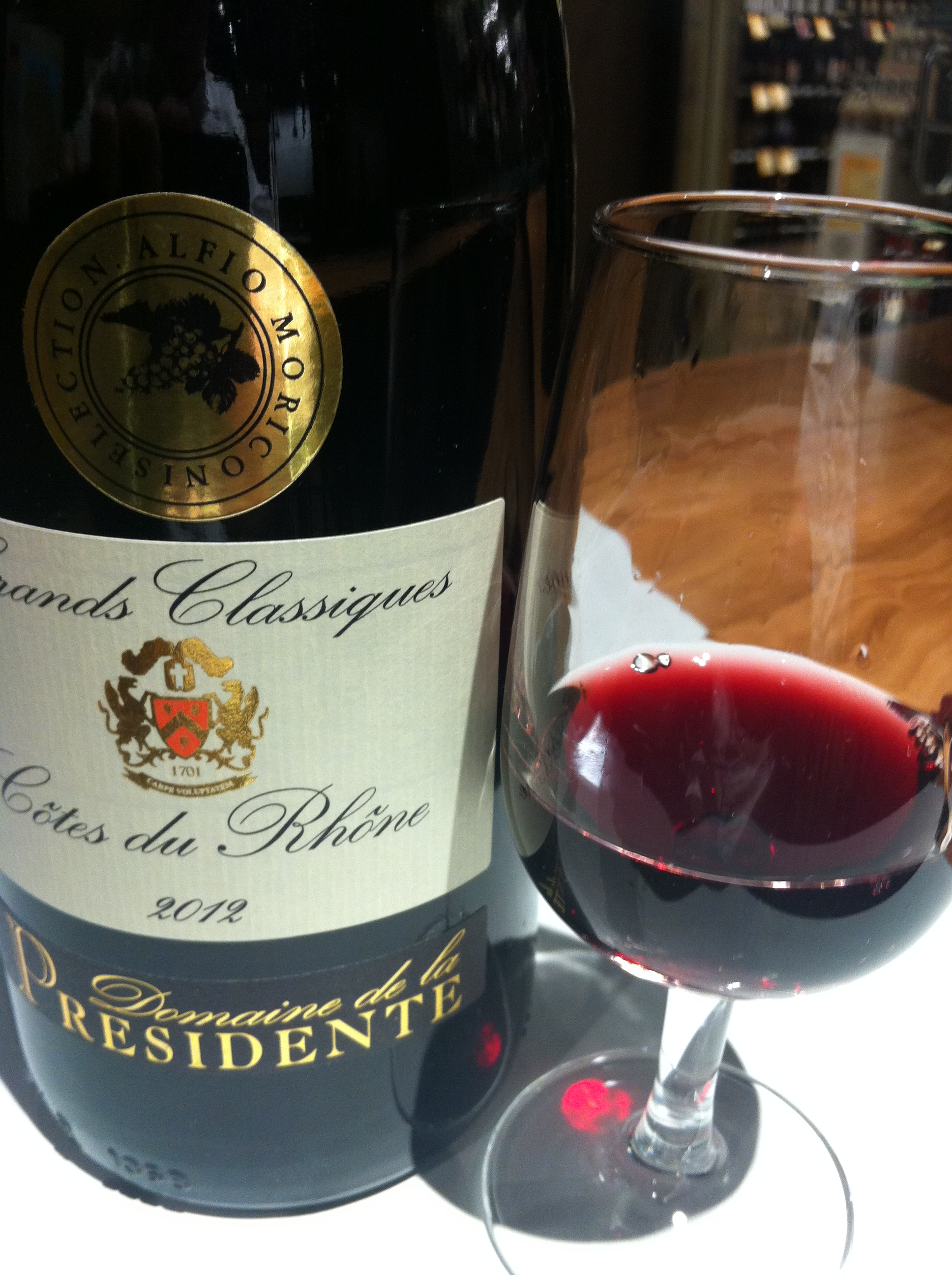
- Type: Appellation d'origine contrôlée
- Year established: Est. 1937. Used since 1650
- Country: France
- Part of: Rhône wine
- Climate region: North: continental moderate South: chiefly mediterranean
- Soil conditions: North: granite, argili-calcairous South: chiefly sandstone, limestone, alluvia, loess, quartzite shingle
- Total area: 83,800 ha (approx.)
- Grapes produced: Red varieties (in descending order): Grenache, Syrah, Mourvèdre, Cinsault, Carignan, Counoise, Picpoul White varieties: Grenache blanc, Marsanne, Roussanne, Bourboulenc, Viognier, Picpoul blanc
- Wine produced: (in descending order) named crus, Côtes du Rhône Villages (named), Côtes du Rhône Villages, Côtes du Rhône

Detailed map of the Rhône wine region, with separate maps of Southern Rhône ("Zoom A") and Northern Rhône ("Zoom B")

Côtes du Rhône (French: [kot dy ʁon]) is a wine-growing Appellation d'Origine Contrôlée (AOC) for the Rhône wine region of France, which may be used throughout the region, also in those areas which are covered by other AOCs. In a limited part of the region, the Côtes-du-Rhône Villages AOC may be used, in some cases together with the name of the commune.

Côtes du Rhône are the basic AOC wines of the Rhône region, and exist as red, white and rosé wines, generally dominated by Grenache for reds and rosés, or Grenache blanc for whites.

== History ==
Wines have been produced in the region since pre-Roman times, and those from the right bank were the favourite wines of kings and the papal community in Avignon at the time of the schism. In the mid-17th century the right-bank district of Côte du Rhône had issued regulations to govern the quality of its wine and in 1737 the king ordered that casks of wine shipped from the nearby river port of Roquemaure, directly on the right bank 12 km north of Avignon on the left bank, should be branded with the letters CDR to introduce a system of protecting its origin. The rules for its Côte du Rhône thus formed the very early basis of today's nationwide AOC system governed by the INAO. The name was changed to Côtes du Rhône when the left-bank wines were included in the appellation some hundred years later. The appellation received full recognition by a High Court decision in 1937, and the rules were revised in 1996 and 2001 to take into account new conditions of production.

Roquemaure is known as "La Capitale des Amoureux", or "The Capital of Lovers". In 1868 the relics of St. Valentine arrived after being purchased from Rome by Maximilian Richard, a local dignitary, as it was believed that the relics would protect the vines from phylloxera which ravaged the vineyards in 1866. The relics are kept in the 14th century collegiate church and each year the St Valentine Festival of the Kiss attracts over 20,000 people. Reporter Pierre-Marie Doutrelant revealed that "the growers of Côtes du Rhône planted mourvèdre and syrah, two low-yield grapes that give the wine finesse, strictly for the benefit of government inspectors. Then, when the inspectors left, they grafted cheap high-yield vines—grenache and carignan—back onto the vines" (Prial)

== The wines ==
=== Côtes du Rhône ===
At the generic level, the official AOC Côtes du Rhône region stretches 200 km from Vienne in the north to Avignon in the south and from the foothills of the Massif Central in the west to the fore-slopes of the Vaucluse and Luberon mountains east of the town of Orange. 171 communes in the French departments of Ardèche, Bouches du Rhône, Drôme, Gard, Loire, and Vaucluse are concerned with production from the 83,839 (2008) hectares of vineyard. The average yield is 52 hectolitres per hectare. Wines of all three colours must have a minimum alcohol content of 11%. The average annual production of CDR of around 3.3 million hectolitres – 419 million bottles – (2005/2006), is assured by 5,292 concerns including 5,202 growers, 875 private producers, 70 co-operative wineries, and 20 merchant/producers and blenders, making it one of the largest single appellation regions in the world.

Red and rosé wines are made from Grenache noir, Syrah, Cinsault, Carignane, Counoise and Mourvèdre grape varieties. A maximum of 20% white varieties may be used in the rosés. All reds grown south of Montélimar must contain a minimum of 40% Grenache, and may contain up to 5% white grapes. A red from anywhere in the appellation must contain a minimum of 15% Syrah and/or Mourvedre. The whites must contain a minimum blend of 80% Clairette, Grenache blanc, Marsanne, Roussanne, Bourboulenc, and Viognier. Ugni blanc and Picpoul blanc may be used as secondary varieties.

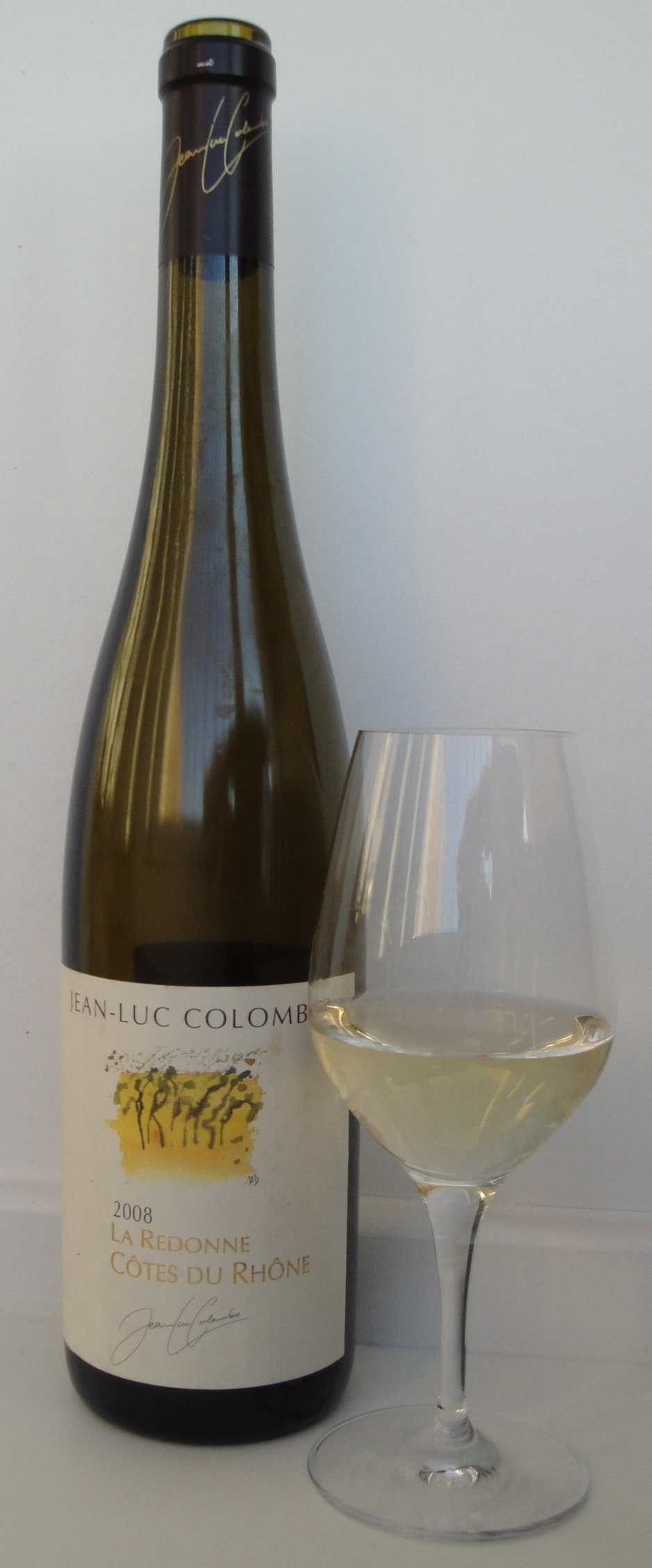
A white Côtes du Rhône wine, in this case dominated by Viognier and Roussanne

There are two sub regions of Rhône wines:

1. Côtes du Rhône septentrional in the northern part of the region from Vienne to Valence. The vines are cultivated on very steep slopes making the harvest extremely arduous. The grapes are manually picked and have to be hauled up the hillside on trolleys, a feature which adds to the price. Syrah is the dominant red grape in this area.

2. Côtes du Rhône méridional from Montélimar to Avignon in the southern latitudes, produced by 123 communes. The great majority of these are cultivated on the eastern side of the Rhône between the river bank near the town of Orange, and the Vaucluse-Luberon chain of mountains. The wines here are anchored by Grenache noir but typically include other grapes such as Syrah and Mourvedre. The reds range in color from deep crimson and ruby to almost purple and are generally full-bodied with rich but smooth tannins, though Lirac and others from the right bank tend to be somewhat lighter. They all go very well with game and other rich meat dishes.

The whites range from dry with a tang of citrus to fuller, rounder wines which can be consumed as an aperitif. Condrieu, a septentrional, is one of the rarest white wines in the world and is produced from 100% Viognier – a notoriously difficult grape to vinify.

Year of Production : In general, the year-to-year climate of the region remains fairly constant, although there may be rare occasions of spring frost which may damage the buds, thus reducing the overall yield. Drought may also affect the quantity of production. Sunlight levels are usually the average to be expected. The year of production on a label is therefore not necessarily a sign of any particular quality due to exceptionally favourable wine growing weather; it is more indicative of how the wine can be expected to have matured over a number of years.

=== Côtes du Rhône-Villages ===
Further up the scale from the Côtes du Rhône AOC the Côtes du Rhône-Villages AOC is produced by 95 authorized communes in the departments of the Ardèche, the Drôme, the Gard, and the Vaucluse. The appellation includes 95 communes, with a total of approximately 3,000 hectares under cultivation. The average yield is approximately 38 hectolitres per hectare. The Grenache grape is required to be present at not less than 50%, with 20% Syrah and/or Mourvèdre. A maximum of 20% of other authorized varieties is permitted. The minimum required alcoholic strength is 12%.

=== Côtes du Rhône Villages (named village) ===
Next in the hierarchy, 18 of the Côtes du Rhône Village appellations are authorized to include their village name on the label. With approximately 6,500 hectares under cultivation, the average yield is approximately 37 hectolitres per hectare. Current regulation includes following villages: Cairanne, Chusclan (red and rosé only), Gadagne, Laudun, Massif d'Uchaux (red only), Plan de Dieu (red only), Puyméras (red only), Roaix, Rochegude, Rousset-les-Vignes, Sablet, Saint Gervais, Saint Maurice, Saint-Pantaléon-les-Vignes, Séguret, Signargues (red only), Valréas, Visan.

=== Crus ===
At the most demanding level of distinction, a total of 17 crus are allowed to be recognized by their village name without requiring the mention of Côtes du Rhône on the label. With the unique exception of Château-Grillet, a white septentrional within the AOC Condrieu, a feature of the nomenclature of CDR wines is that at the top level they are named only after their villages, and not after châteaux as is usual for Bordeaux wines. Tavel is a rosé only, very light and dry, which is usually drunk chilled. Beaumes de Venise AOC, Château-Grillet AOC, Châteauneuf-du-Pape AOC, Condrieu AOC, Cornas AOC, Côte-Rôtie AOC, Crozes-Hermitage AOC, Gigondas AOC, Hermitage AOC, Lirac AOC, Rasteau AOC, Saint Joseph AOC, Saint Péray AOC, Tavel AOC, Vacqueyras AOC, Vinsobres AOC, and Cairanne AOC

== Grape varieties ==
A large number of varieties are allowed in the Côtes du Rhône AOC. The allowed grape varieties, by colour of the wine, are indicated below. Main grape varieties for the respective colour are indicated by "M", supplementary varieties (not designated for white wines) by "S", and accessory varieties by "(A)".

Variety	Red and rosé wines	White wines
Bourboulenc	(A)	M
Brun Argenté (locally called Camarèse or Vaccarèse)	(A)	
Carignan	(A)	
Cinsaut	(A)	
Clairette blanche	(A)	M
Clairette rose	(A)	
Counoise	(A)	
Grenache blanc	(A)	M
Grenache gris	(A)	
Grenache noir	M	
Marsanne	(A)	M
Marselan	(A)	
Mourvèdre	S	
Muscardin	(A)	
Piquepoul blanc	(A)	(A)
Piquepoul noir	(A)	
Roussanne	(A)	M
Syrah	S	
Terret noir	(A)	
Ugni blanc	(A)	(A)
Viognier	(A)	M

The rules for the proportion of main, supplementary and accessory grape varieties are the following:

- White wines: a minimum of 80% of the main grape varieties.
- Red and rosé wines:
  - The main grape variety (Grenache noir) must make up at least 40% of the blend for wines from south of Montélimar.
  - The supplementary grape varieties (Mourvèdre and Syrah) must together make up at least 15% of the blend, although this rule is not applied to small producers who produce their own wine from less than 1.5 hectares (3.7 acres) of vineyard area.
  - The main and supplementary grape varieties must together make up at least 70% of the blend, and the accessory grape varieties are therefore restricted to a maximum of 30%.
  - Marselan is not allowed to make up more than 10% of the blend.
  - The total proportion of white varieties (all of them accessory) may not exceed 5% for red wines, and 20% for rosé wines.

The rules for the red wines mean that varietal (100%) Grenache noir may only be produced by small producers under the Côtes du Rhône appellation. North of Montélimar, varietal Mourvèdre and Syrah wines may be produced.

== Commercial aspects ==
Not all growers produce their own wine, their grapes either being delivered to the co-operative wineries where the wine can be purchased in bottles and in bulk 5-litre and 10-litre plastic containers, or to the merchants who have facilities for vinification, bottling, and distribution on a commercial scale. Independent producers generally deliver their wine in bulk to the merchants for blending, bottling, and commercial distribution.

Some producers have a small quantity of their wine bottled for sale at the property, although the production of Côtes du Rhône in the region is so vast that there is little advantage for the private producers to do their own bottling. An exception would be the producers who, known for their higher appellations, may wish to gain extra distinction by including mis en bouteille à la propriété (bottled on the premises - often by a visiting mobile bottling and labeling plant), or mis en bouteille dans nos chais (outsourced bottling) on their labels.

Larger domaines may have their own bottling machinery particularly if, in accordance with the regulations for the AOCs, they also produce wines of the higher denominations of Côtes du Rhône Villages, Côtes du Rhône Villages (named village), crus, and speciality wines. In theory producers of any of the other higher appellations - Côtes du Rhône Villages, Côtes du Rhône Villages (named villages) and crus from the area of the AOC could label their wines Côtes du Rhône as long as it meets the AOC requirements, and occasionally, in order to avoid a glut and maintain prices, wines are declassed and sold as a lower denomination or in bulk for blending.

Cooperative wineries distribute their bottled wine to wholesale and retail outlets in the region and to a lesser extent, to a customer base of retailers in other parts of the country. Marketing and distribution on a large scale, including export, is carried out by the merchants.

Producers of Côtes du Rhône wines are members of the Syndicat des Vignerons des Côtes du Rhône, and at a higher level their interests are represented by Inter Rhône, which represents all the wine-growing and wine merchants of the Côtes du Rhône and the Rhône Valley and combines all promotional, economic and technical actions concerning AOC wines of the region.

== See also ==
- List of Vins de Primeur
- Cellier des Dauphins
- Wine warehouses of Bercy
