= Cairanne AOC =

Wine region

- Wine region
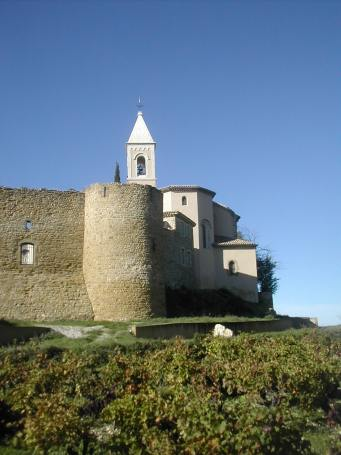
- Type: Appellation d'Origine Contrôlée
- Year established: 1967 (2018)
- Country: France
- Part of: Rhône Valley
- Climate region: Mediterranean
- Size of planted vineyards: 760 hectares (1,900 acres)
- Grapes produced: Grenache noir, Syrah, Grenache blanc, and Clairette
- Wine produced: red, white

Cairanne AOC (French pronunciation: [kɛʁan]) is a wine-growing AOC in the southern Rhône wine region of France, in the commune of Cairanne in the Vaucluse département. Red and white wines are produced. Previously a part of Côtes-du-Rhône Villages AOC, the wines received their own AOC provisionally on 20 June 2016, and definitely on 25 June 2018.

== History ==
In the 15th century approximately 40 hectares (99 acres) of vines were planted. Cairanne was one five communes in the Côtes-du-Rhône appellation that stood out sufficiently to be included in the initial considerations for creating a Côtes-du-Rhône-Villages appellation. The name Côtes-du-Rhône Cairanne was used from 1953, and the designation Côtes-du-Rhône-Villages Cairanne followed in 1967, when the "Villages" AOC was finally created.

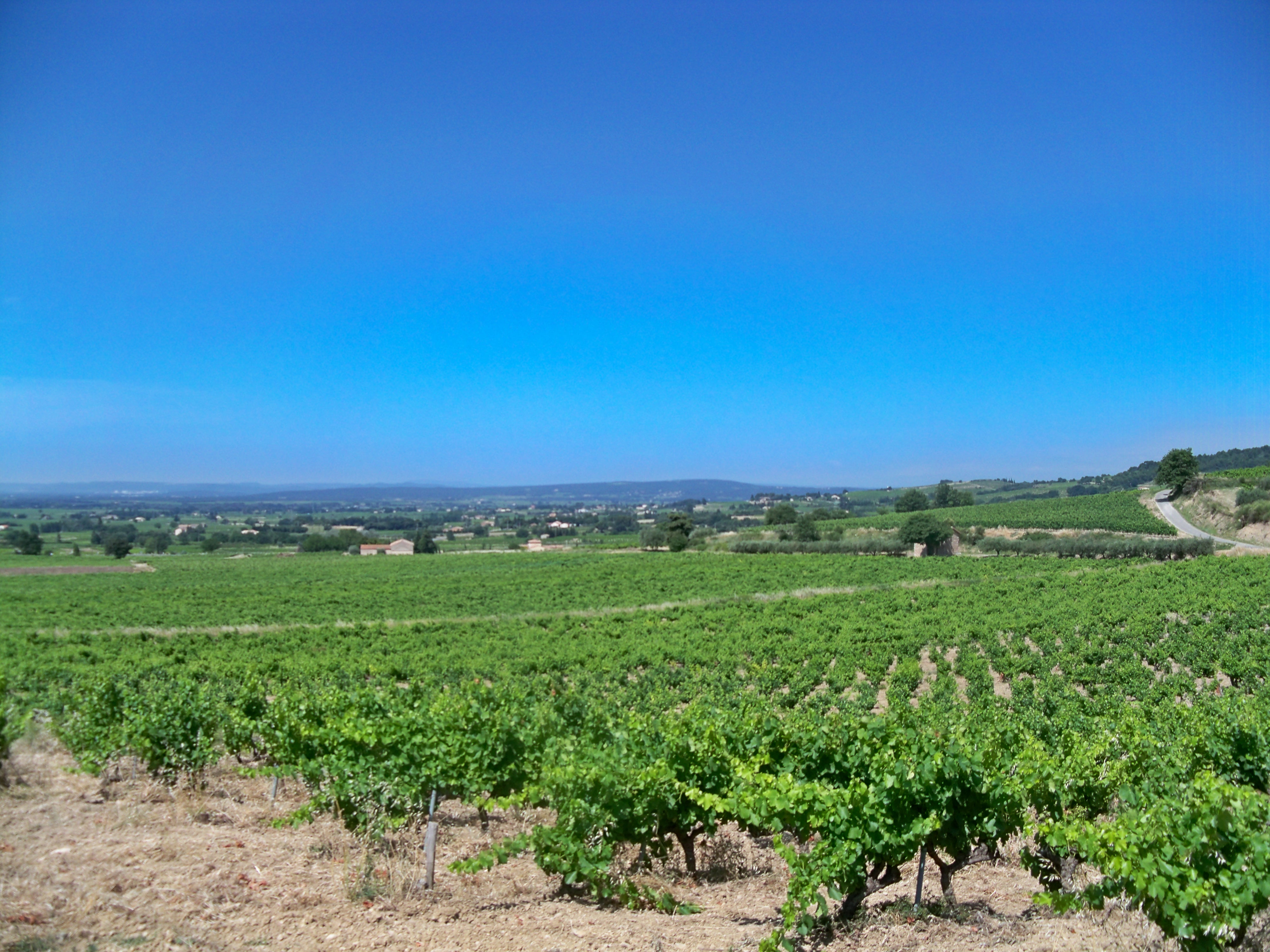
Cairanne vineyards.
