= Côtes-du-Rhône Villages AOC =

French wine

- Wine region
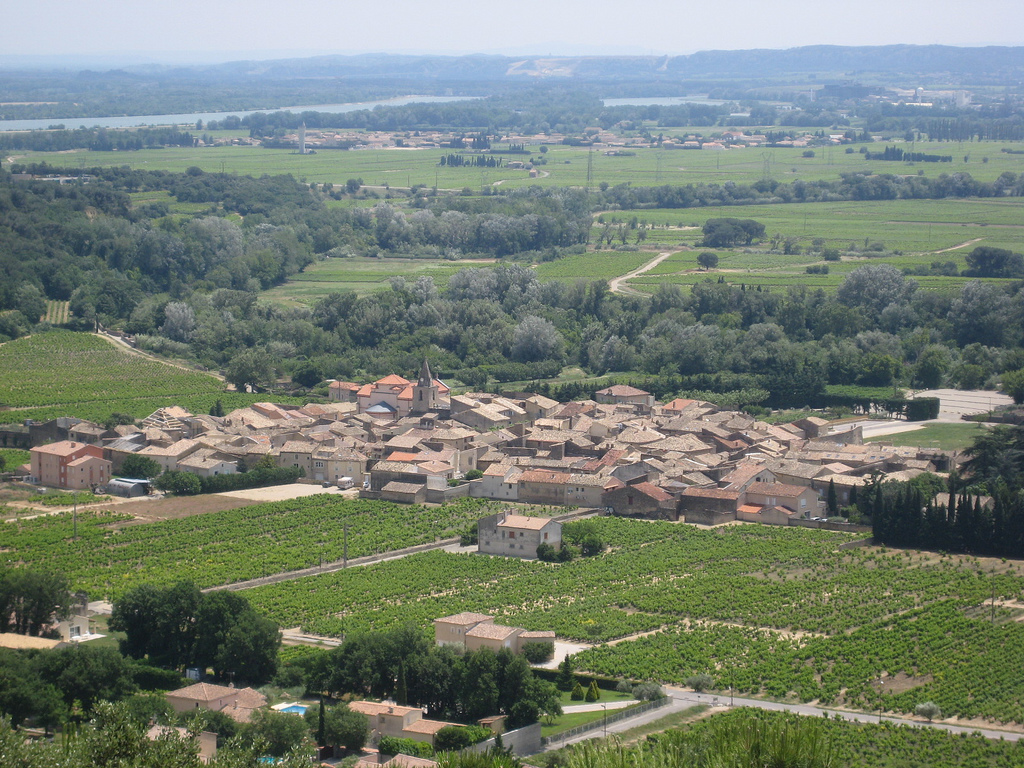
- Official name: Côtes-du-Rhône Villages AOC
- Type: Appellation d'origine contrôlée
- Year established: 1967
- Country: France
- Part of: Rhône Valley
- Climate region: mediterranean
- Soil conditions: argilo-calcaireous, heavily pebbled; alluvial plain
- Size of planted vineyards: 8,721 ha incl. named villages
- Wine produced: red, white, rosé
- Comments: 2023 data

Côtes-du-Rhône Villages (French pronunciation: [kot dy ʁon vilaʒ]) is a French wine Appellation d'Origine Contrôlée (AOC) produced in 95 settlements in the departments of the Ardèche, the Drôme, the Gard, and the Vaucluse in the southern Rhône wine region of France. Red, white and rosé wine are all produced within the appellation but not by all the named AOC villages, with the red wines being the predominant carrier of the distinction. The quality is superior to the generic Côtes-du-Rhône AOC, but below more specific appellations such as Châteauneuf-du-Pape AOC and Vacqueyras AOC. Côtes-du-Rhône Villages is the second largest appellation in the Rhône, only surpassed in size by Côtes-du-Rhône AOC.

== History ==
Côtes-du-Rhône-Villages was established as AOC in 1966-1967 though drafts originated from as early as 1953. Five communes stood out, Cairanne, Gigondas (both now appellations in themselves), Chusclan, Laudun and Saint-Maurice-sur-Eygues. These communes or villages were allowed to put their name on the label in exchange of submitting to a number of regulations, such as a minimum alcohol level (12.5%). In 1955 Vacqueyras was accepted in the small group and two years later, Vinsobres. The inspiration for the appellation was found in Beaujolais, which also has a village-level of wine. Since then, the appellation has expanded to almost 10,000 hectares, half of which can add the name of the village to the label. The other half can distinguish themselves from Côtes-du-Rhône by merely adding the "village".

== Villages ==
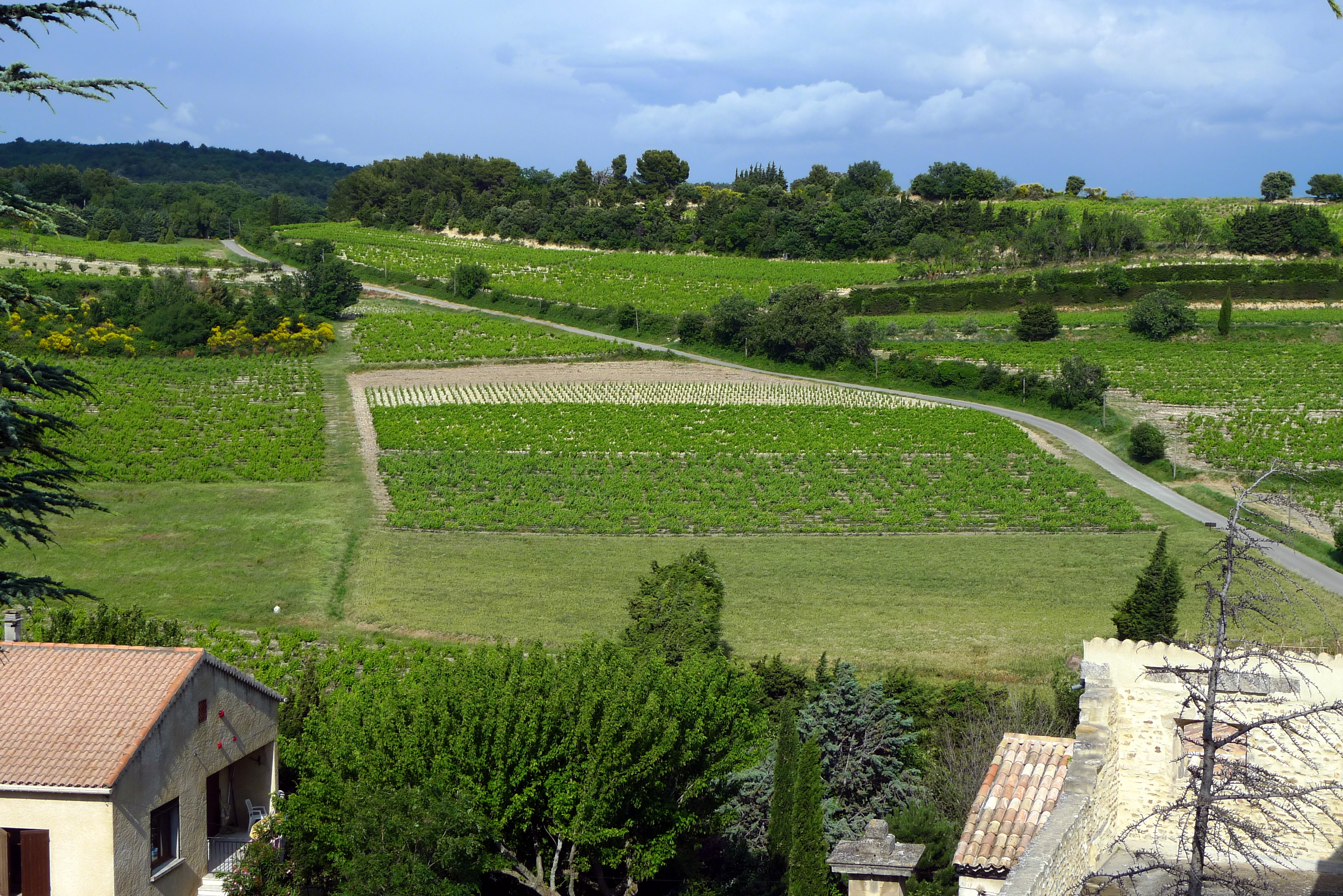
Vineyards around the Côtes du Rhône village of Visan.

=== Côtes du Rhône Villages ===
With a total of approximately 8,721 hectares under cultivation (as of 2024) for Côtes du Rhône Villages, the average yield is approximately 34 hectoliters per hectare. Producers are required to adhere to stricter wine growing and wine making rules than those prescribed for Côtes du Rhône. In the red wines the Grenache grape must be present at not less than 50%, with 20% Syrah and/or Mourvèdre. A maximum of 20% of other authorized varieties is permitted. The rosés must contain a minimum of 50% Grenache with 20% of Syrah and/or Mourvèdre and a maximum of 20% of other authorised varieties to comprise not more than 20% of white varieties. Used are Grenache, Clairette, Marsanne, Rousanne, Bouboulenc and Viognier. The white wines are a blend of Grenache white, Clairette white, Marsanne white, Rousanne white, Bourboulenc white and Viognier. Other varieties are allowed to a maximum of 20%. The minimum required alcoholic strength is fixed at 12% for all three colours. The current (as of 1 January 2025) full specification for the cultivation of the vines, the growing area boundaries, and the blending of the varieties is governed by the Syndicate des Vignerons des Côtes du Rhône (Syndicate of the winegrowers of the Côtes du Rhône) in Avignon.

=== Côtes du Rhône Villages with named village appellations ===
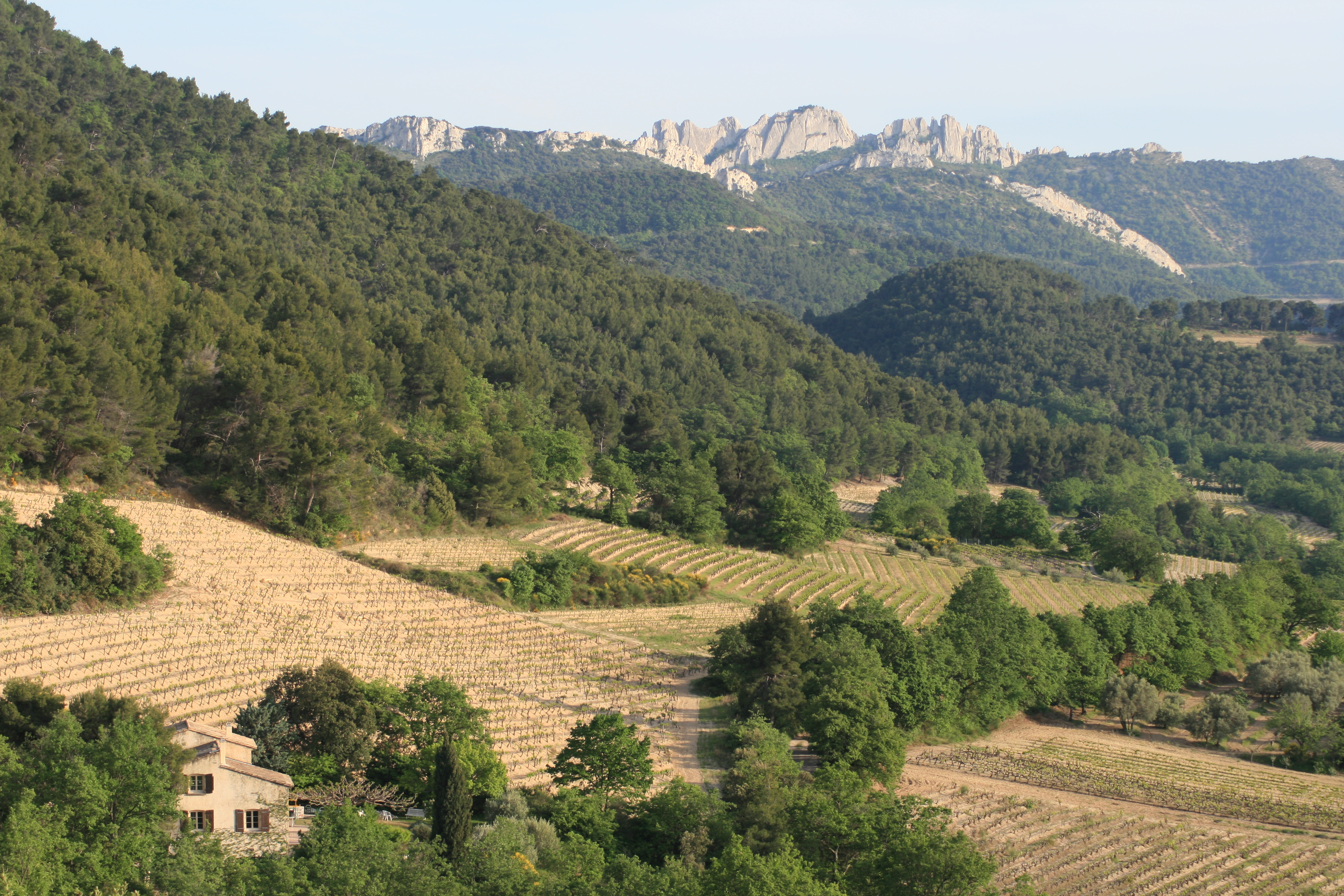
Vineyards around the village of Sablet with the Dentelles de Montmirail in the background

Under stricter requirements than for the Côtes du Rhône Villages, 22 of the communes of the Côtes du Rhône Villages appellation are authorized to add their respective village name on the label. With around 5,500 hectares under cultivation, the average yield is 33 to 37 hectoliters per hectare. The minimum required alcoholic strength is fixed at 12.5% for the reds and 12% for the whites and rosés.

Chusclan wines have been produced by both Roman legionaries and Benedictine monks and it was served at royal tables. Located to the west of the Rhône in the Gard département, the planted area covers 261 ha.in and around the villages of Chusclan, Codolet, Orsan, Saint-Etiennedes-Sorts and the town of Bagnols-sur-Cèze, and in 2023 produced 9,220 hectolitres. The Rosé wines, much in the minority since 1970 when producers turned their attention to reds, were granted named village status in 1967, and the reds were promoted in 1971.

Gadagne near Avignon, is a full bodied left bank wine and is the most southerly of the named villages and centred around the Vaucluse villages and towns of Caumont-sur-Durance, Châteauneuf-de-Gadagne, Morières-lès-Avignon, Saint-Saturnin-lès-Avignon, and Vedène. The named village appellation covers red wine made mainly from Grenache noir, Mourvèdre, and Syrah, and was promoted in 2012. 108 planted hectares produced 3,809 hectolitres in 2023.

Laudun is one of the larger named villages, and also encompasses the communes of Saint-Victor-la-Coste and Tresques. Like Chusclan and other west bank wines, it has a history centered around ancient vineyards established around 300-200 BC, and in 1375 wines from here were sent to the pope in Avignon. Later, in 1561, the wine was exported to Rome and when Louis XIII visited he tasted the white wine of Laudun. The famous and much sought after white wine accounts for around 30% of Laudun wines, but an average of only 6% is produced as a named village. Covering only 350 ha. in 2004, the vinyard expanded significantly over the following decade. By 2023 the cultivated area had increased to 591 hectares and produced 22,390 hectolitres.

Massif d'Uchaux is produced in Lagarde-Paréol, Mondragon, Piolenc, Sérignan-du-Comtat and Uchaux in the department of Vaucluse, close to the Rhône and just north of Châteauneuf-du-Pape and Avignon. The red wine was upgraded to Côtes du Rhône Villages in 1983 and promoted to a named village in 2005. Grown on poor sandy and clay soils on calcerous limestone bedrock which together with an elevation of 100 to 280 meters, give this wine a character, unique among the village AOCs, of strawberry, raspberry, pepper, and nutmeg.

Nyons is a red wine only and is generally made from two-thirds Grenache and one-third Syrah. It is the newest (as of 2024) of all the named villages, and was granted its AOC in 2020. It is one of the highest altitudes, with vines cultivated in the villages of Nyons, Mirabel-aux-Baronnies, Piégon and Venterol in the department of Drôme between 200m and 500m above sea level. With global warming more and more winegrowers are increasingly attracted to higher ground. Nyons produces around 2,767 hl. over an area of 74 ha.(2023)

Plan de Dieu was accorded the Villages AOC for the reds in 2005 and elevated to a named village in 2011. The vast, flat vineyard on an alluvial plain that stretches across the villages of Camaret-sur-Aigues, Jonquières, Travaillan and Violès in the Vaucluse department, has the highest production of the named villages from its planted area of 1,170 ha., yielding 41,871 hectolitres in 2023. This is a very full bodied wine typical of the eastern Vaucluse wines of the appellation.

Puyméras was promoted to a named village in 2011. In 2023 the 89 ha. planted on terraces rising at altitudes from 220 to 600m produced 3,182 ha. around the villages of Mérindol-les-Oliviers and Mollans-sur-Ouvèze in the department of Drôme, and Faucon, Saint-Romain-en-Viennois et Puyméras in the Vaucluse.

Roaix is located between the crus of Rasteau and Cairanne on the eastern flank of the Ventabren mountain in the east of the Vaucluse department. Predominately red wine with similar characteristics as its grand neighbours that will keep for up to ten years, with white and rosé produced in small volumes. The steep and stony red clay terroir of 138 hectares yielded 4,272 hl. in 2023. Roaix received its recognition as a named village in 1967.

Rochegude village was allegedly established during the reign of emperor Domitian (51-96) and Jefferson is said to have presented wines from here to Washington himself! On its relatively flat or slightly sloping ground at a height of around 100 metres, the relatively small vineyard goes from rocky slopes to sand, clay, and flint lower down. The diversity enables the growers to assemble a variety of styles of the red wine and also some white and rosé, and in 2023 the 132 hectares produced 4,181 hectolitres.

Rousset-les-Vignes in the Drôme department is one of the northernmost of the 22 named villages. The steep vineyard of sandstone and pebbles is located at 400 m. altitude making it a village with a somewhat cooler climate than villages at lower altitudes. Though wine has been made here since the 15th century it is a very small vineyard with only 21 of its 60 hectars dedicated to the production of all three colours of the named village appelation, and yielding 642 hectolitres in 2023. The village was added to the named villages list in 1969.

Sablet is located at the foot of the Dentelles de Montmirail next to the cru of Gigondas AOC. The vineyard is mainly of the very sandy ground from which the village derives its name (sable - sand) and which contributes to the special character of its wines, in particular the renowned whites of which it is the largest producer of the named villages. In 2023 the cultivated 347 hectares yielded 11,493 hectolitres of which the majority is produced by the cooperative. When, in 1867, the vineyards of France were devastated by phylloxera, it was a Sabletain, Francois Leydier, who invented the grafting machine which helped enormously in saving the wine industry in this region and throughout France.

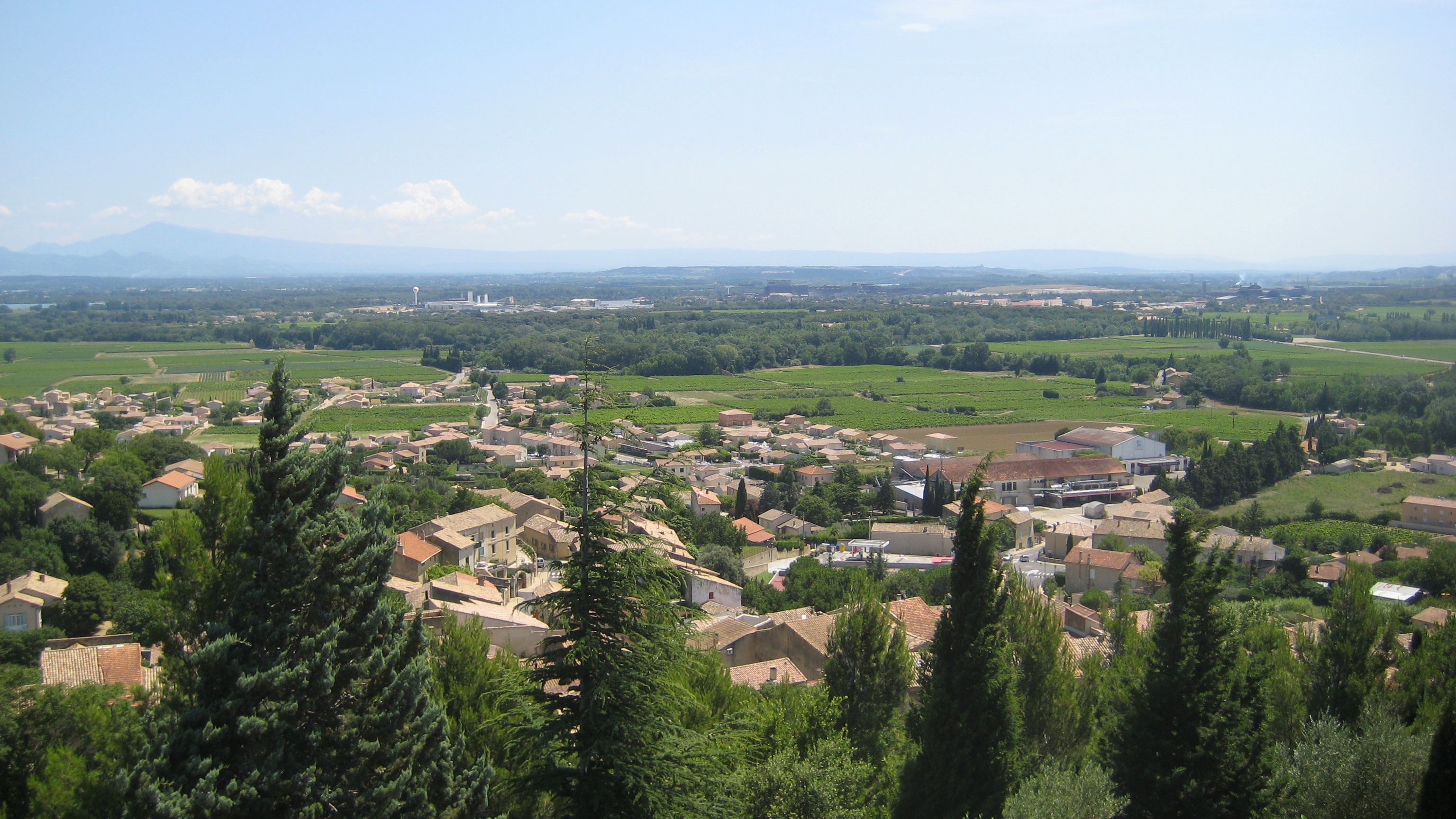
Countryside around the village of Laudun.

Saint-Andéol is one of the smallest named villages and was promoted in 2017. A west bank Rhône wine, it is the only named village AOC in the department of Ardèche and is produced in and around the villages of Saint-Marcel, Saint-Just, Saint-Martin d’Ardèche and Bourg-Saint-Andéol. The appellation is only for red wines which must be made from Grenache, and together with Syrah and Mourvèdre the three varieties must constitute 66% of the wine. In 2023 72 planted ha. yielded 2,550 hl.

Sainte-Cécile with the Vaucluse villages of Sainte-Cécile-les- Vignes, Sérignan-du-Comtat and Tulette, and Suze-la-Rousse, and Travaillan in the Gard, produces wines from the northern area soil which consists of silty clay with pebbles, and the southern part of the vineyard which is made up of limestone pebbles and sandy clay. A total of 364 planted hectares produced 12,583 hectolitres in 2023. The AOC for named villages was granted in 2016.

Saint-Gervais in the Gard department is a small west bank vineyard of only 79 ha. which produced 2,698 hectolitres in 2023 It became a named village in 1974 for its red and white wines. Located just to the north of the Lirac AOCcru in a niche in the valley of the Cèze river to the west of the Rhône, the soil is sandy limestone and clay. The climate is cooled slightly. However the river-facing vineyards are exposed to both heat and extreme winds. The local cooperative handles most of the wine produced by the village. As early as 1789 the marquis de Guasc made his own wine in the region and became a role model for independent producers.

Saint-Maurice is nested on the border of Nyons between the cru of Vinsobres AOC in the east and the named village of Visan in the west and shares their characteristics. The vineyard in Saint-Maurice-sur-Eygues was classed as Côtes du Rhône in 1953 and was raised to named village status in 1967. The 108 ha. of sandy, chalky soil yielded 3,854 hl. of red, rosé, and white wine in 2023.

Saint-Pantaléon-les-Vignes just 3 km south of Rousset-les-Vignes, the tiny Saint-Pantaléon-les-Vignes vineyard shares both its terroir and history. The 26 planted hectares produced a total 2665 hectolitres of red, white, and rosé in 2023. Saint-Pantaléon was elevated to the named village status in 1969. Every year a ceremony is held in the village, when the oldest and the youngest wine producer, along with the village's administration, decide when to begin harvesting.

Séguret is one of the largest named villages and one of the oldest. The appelation makes all three colours at 90% red, 6% white, and 4% rosé of which it is the largest producer in the named villages. The mountain vineyard is located on the eastern side of the river Oèveze and completely surrounds the commune at around a height of 150 metres right up into the chalky foot slopes of the vertical peaks of the Dentelles de Montmirail and on pebbled terraces at an altitude of 250 to 350 metres. Its wine is mentioned by Pliny the Elder in his encyclopedic Naturalis Historia (Natural History). The 468 hectares under cultivation produced 15,009 hectolitres in 2023.

Signargues - a named village appellation without a geographical village, Signargues wine is produced in the Gard department in an area covered by the villages of Domazan and Estézargues, and the towns of Rochefort-du-Gard and Saze. The red wine was elevated to a named village AOC in 2005. The large vineyard's planted 502 hectares yielded 18,752 hectolitres in 2023.

Suze-la-Rousse located in the department of Drôme is a robust and full bodied red wine with the typical character of the eastern Rhône valley wines. Producing only red wine, the 239 hectares yielded 6,783 hectolitres in 2023. Suze-la-Rousse received its named village appellation in 2016. The Château de Suze-la-Rousse is the campus of the University of Wine, a department of the University Institute of Valence. The facility, with its laboratories and tasting rooms is unique in Europe, and offers courses in oenology, marketing, and management for the wine industry.

Vaison-la-Romaine has been producing wines in the east of the region for around two thousand years. The vinyard is spread over its associated villages of Saint-Marcellin-lès-Vaison, Villedieu, Buisson, and Saint-Roman-de-Malegarde on slopes in different directions and winds with altitudes from 160 to 380m just before the terrain gets really mountainous, thus providing the vignerons with a selection of different influences enabling blending the wines from the same varieties. Its 209 hectares produced 6,816 hectolitres in 2023. The AOC was elevated to a named village in 2016.

Valréas is an enclave of the Vaucluse departement entirely surrounded by the department of Drôme. The vinyard radiates in all directions from the village centre and covers 466 planted hectares which produced 14,392 hl. in 2023. The named village AOC was accorded in 1967.

Visan is one of the four villages in the Vaucluse enclave of the canton of Valréas entirely surrounded by the department of Drôme. Vines were exploited in the 3rd century. Red, white, and rosé wines were accorded the named village appellation in 1966. Visan is a medium-sized vinyard of 580 planted hectares of fat clay soil surrounding the village which produced 18,477 hl. in 2023.

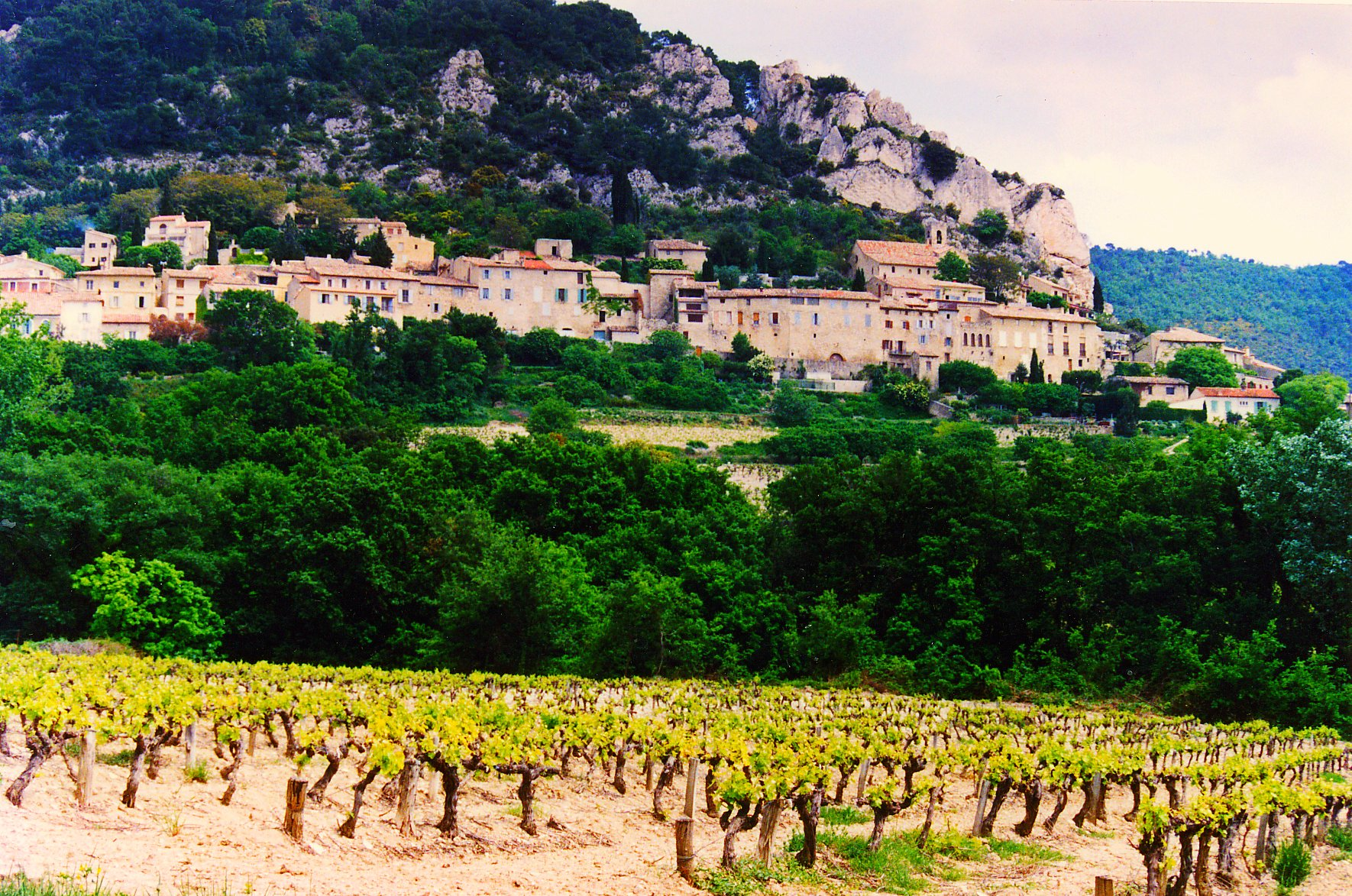
Vineyards around the Côtes du Rhône village of Séguret.

== Grape varieties ==
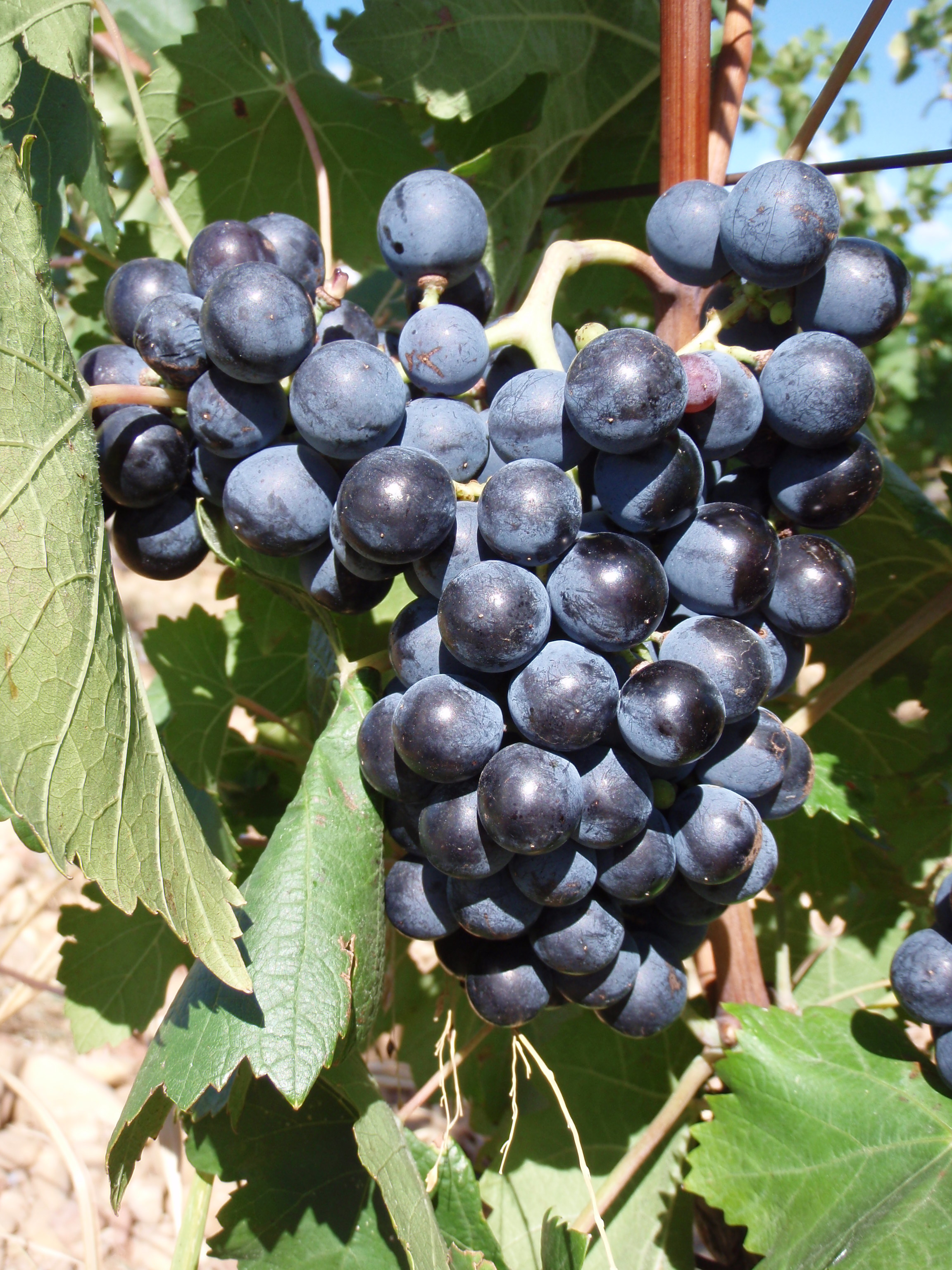
Brun Argenté/Vaccarèse

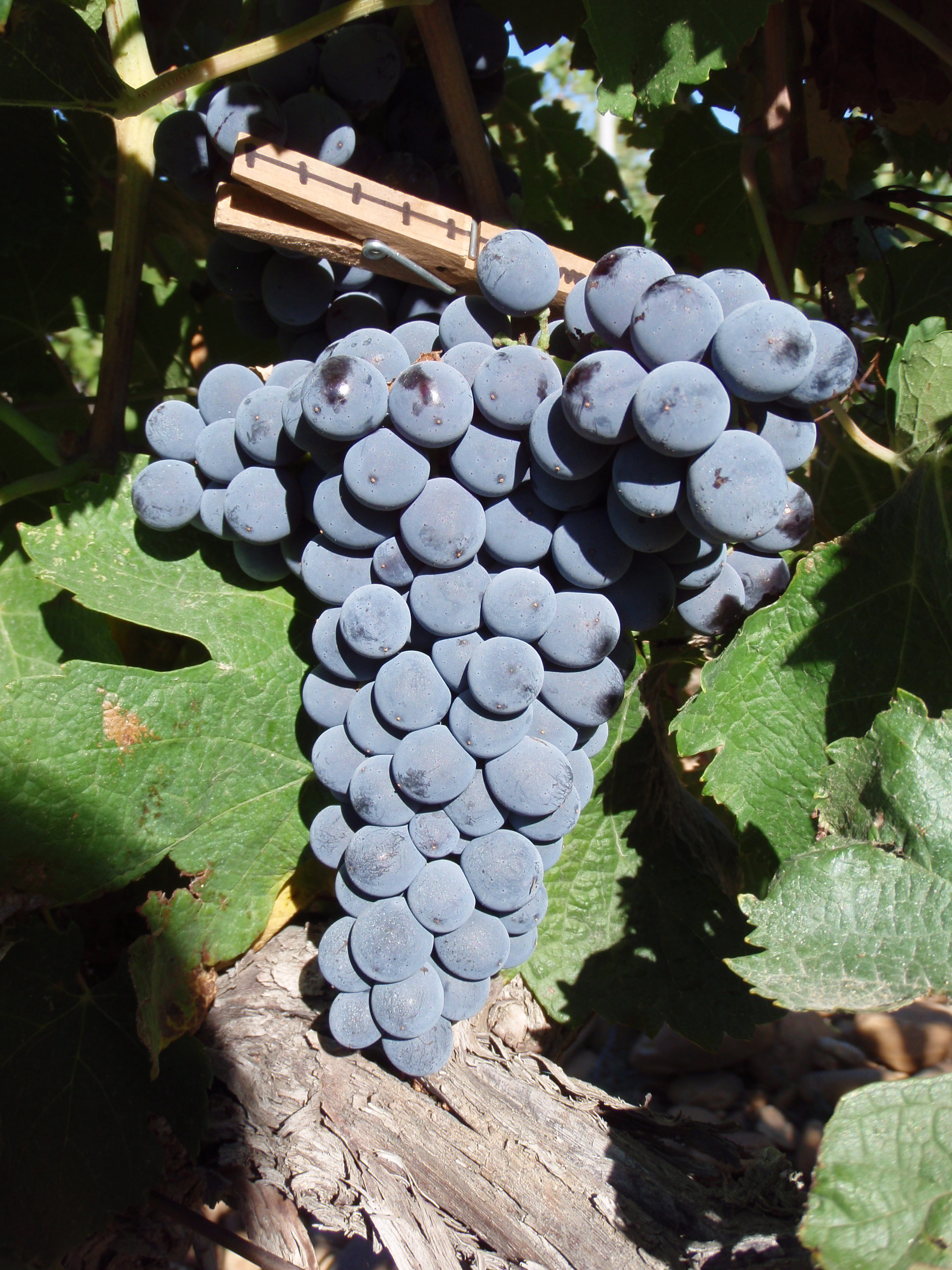
Muscardin.

A large number of varieties are allowed in the Côtes du Rhône Villages AOC. The allowed grape varieties, by colour of the wine, are indicated below. Main grape varieties for the respective color are indicated by "M", supplementary varieties (not designated for white wines) by "S", and accessory varieties by "(A)".

Variety	Red wines	Rosé wines	White wines
Bourboulenc		(A)	M
Brun Argenté (locally called Camarèse or Vaccarèse)	(A)	(A)	
Carignan	(A)	(A)	
Cinsaut	(A)	(A)	
Clairette blanche		(A)	M
Clairette rose		(A)	
Counoise	(A)	(A)	
Grenache blanc		(A)	M
Grenache gris		(A)	
Grenache noir	M	M	
Marsanne		(A)	M
Mourvedre	S	S	
Muscardin	(A)	(A)	
Piquepoul blanc		(A)	(A)
Piquepoul noir	(A)	(A)	
Roussanne		(A)	M
Syrah	S	S	
Terret noir	(A)	(A)	
Ugni blanc		(A)	(A)
Viognier		(A)	M

The rules for the proportion of main, supplementary and accessory grape varieties are the following:

- White wines: a minimum of 80% of the main grape varieties.
- Red and rosé wines:
  - The main grape variety (Grenache noir) must make up at least 50%.
  - The supplementary grape varieties Syrah and Mourvèdre together must make up at least 20% of the blend.
  - The main and supplementary grape varieties must together make up at least 80% of the blend.
  - The accessory grape varieties are restricted to a maximum of 20% of the blend.

In contrast to Côtes du Rhône without the Village designation, the variety Marselan variety may not be used, the proportion of accessory grapes is restricted to 20% rather than 30%, and Blanc and Rosé varieties are not allowed at all in the red wines.
