= Rhône wine =

Wine region

Detailed map of the Rhône wine region, with separate maps of Southern Rhône ("Zoom A") and Northern Rhône ("Zoom B").

The Rhône wine region (Occitan: Region vinicona del Ròse) in Southern France is situated in the Rhône valley and produces numerous wines under various Appellation d'origine contrôlée (AOC) designations. The region's major appellation in production volume is Côtes du Rhône AOC.

The Rhône is generally divided into two sub-regions with distinct vinicultural traditions, the Northern Rhône (referred to in French as Rhône septentrional) and the Southern Rhône (in French Rhône méridional). The northern sub-region produces red wines from the Syrah grape, sometimes blended with up to 20% of white wine grapes, and white wines from Marsanne, Roussanne and Viognier grapes. The southern sub-region produces an array of red, white and rosé wines, often blends of several grapes such as in Châteauneuf-du-Pape.

== History ==
The first cultivated vines in the region were probably planted around 600 BC. The origins of the two most important grape varieties in the northern Rhone (Syrah and Viognier) have in the past been subject to speculation. Some suggested that the Greeks were responsible for bringing the Syrah grape from the Persian city of Shiraz. Others that the grape came 50 years later when Greeks fled from the Persian king Cyrus I. Yet others suggested the grape came from the Sicilian city of Syracuse, whence circa 280 AD the Romans brought it and the Viognier grape. However, extensive DNA typing and viticultural research has established beyond doubt that Syrah originated in the Rhône region itself.

When the Romans left the area interest in the wine of the region disappeared. Rhône reappeared in the 13th century when the Popes and their considerable purchasing power moved to Avignon, at which time the production of wine expanded greatly. The wines were traded to such a degree that the Duke of Burgundy banned import and export of non-Burgundian wines. In 1446 the city of Dijon forbade all wines from Lyon, Tournon and Vienne, arguing that they were "très petits et pauvres vins" – very small and miserable wines. The name Côtes du Rhône comes from public administration in the Middle Ages and was the name (Côte without 's') of a district in the Gard département. In 1650, to guard against forgeries a set of rules was passed in an attempt to guarantee the origin of the wine. In 1737 King Louis XV of France decreed that all casks destined for resale should be branded C.D.R. These were the wines from the area around Tavel, Roquemaure, Lirac and Chusclan on the western ('right') bank of the Rhône. Just over 100 years later, wines from the 'left' bank were included in the C.D.R. definition.

== Production ==
The various AOC wines of the Rhône Valley region are produced by over 6,000 wine growing properties including 1,837 private wineries and 103 cooperatives. Those vineyard owners which do not vinify their wines themselves deliver their grapes in bulk either to a winemaking cooperative, for example Cellier des Dauphins, or sell them to one of the 51 négociants (wine producers and merchants) who blend, distribute, and export on an industrial scale.

The entire Rhône region produces around 4 million hl of wine each year, of which over half is classified under the Côte du Rhône and Côte du Rhône-Villages appellations. The prestigious Northern Rhône appellations account for less than 5% of the total Rhône wine production.

== Northern Rhône ==
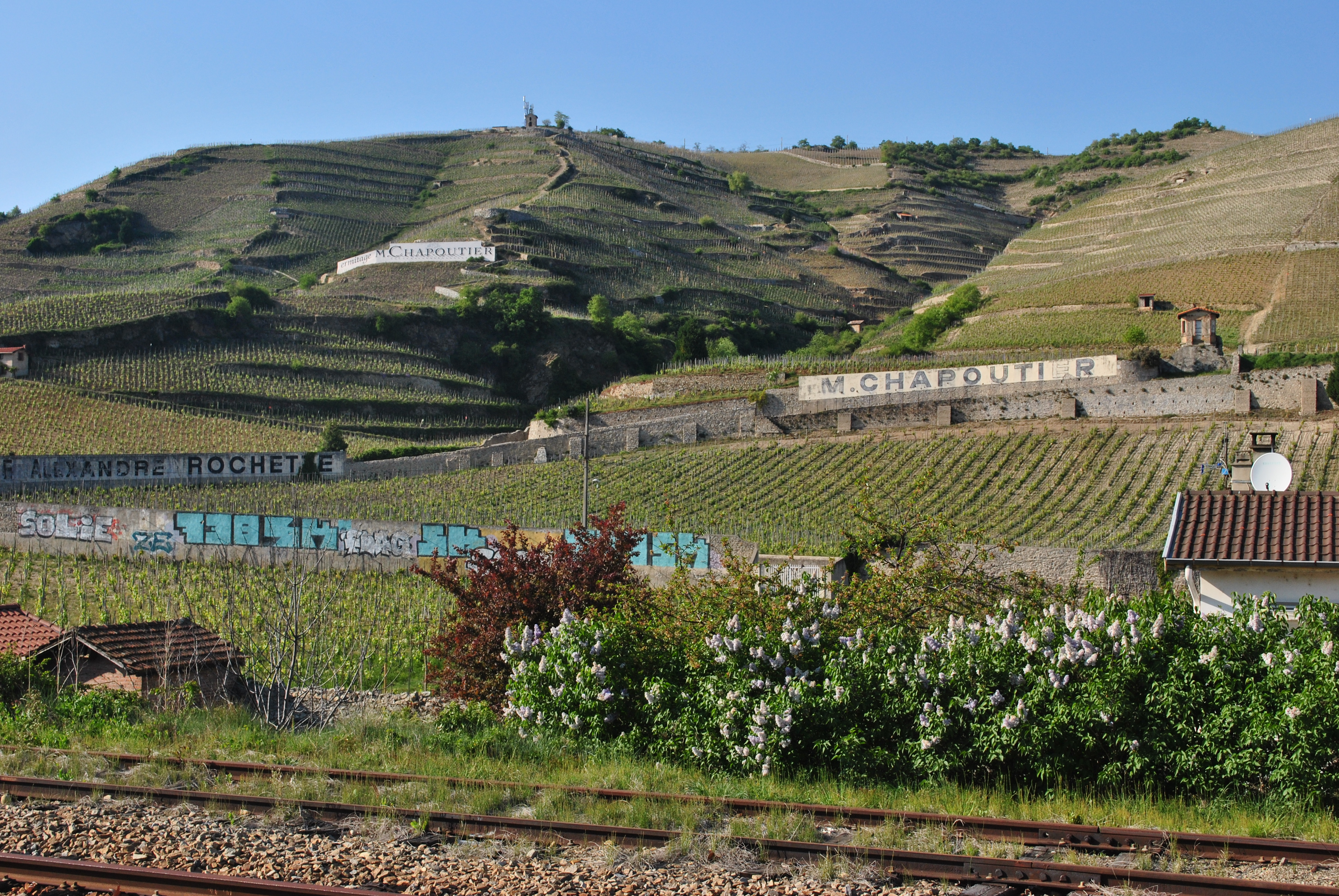
The steep hill on which the Hermitage AOC grapes are produced stands above the Rhône.

The northern Rhône is characterised by a continental climate with harsh winters but warm summers. Its climate is influenced by the mistral wind, which brings colder air from the Massif Central. Northern Rhône is therefore cooler than southern Rhône, which means that the mix of planted grape varieties and wine styles are slightly different.

Syrah is the only red grape variety permitted in red AOC wines from this sub-region. The grape, which is believed to have originated in or close to the Rhône region, is also widely known as Shiraz, its name in Australia and much of the English-speaking world, and has recently become very popular with consumers around the world. For wines bearing the Cornas AOC designation, Syrah must be used exclusively, whereas other reds from the northern Rhône sub-region may be blended with white wine grapes, either Viognier or Marsanne and Roussanne, depending on the appellation. However, while this is allowed by the AOC rules, blending with white grapes is widely practiced only for Côte-Rôtie.

Viognier by itself is used for white wines from Condrieu and Château-Grillet. Marsanne and Roussanne are in turn used for the whites from Crozes-Hermitage, Hermitage, Saint Joseph, and Saint Péray.

From north to south the appellations in the northern Rhône are:

- Côte-Rôtie AOC - reds of Syrah and up to 20% Viognier.
- Condrieu AOC - whites of Viognier only.
- Château-Grillet AOC - whites of Viognier.
- Saint-Joseph AOC - reds of Syrah and up to 10% Marsanne and Roussanne; whites of only Marsanne and Roussanne.
- Crozes-Hermitage AOC - reds of Syrah and up to 15% Marsanne and Roussanne; whites of only Marsanne and Roussanne.
- Hermitage AOC - reds of Syrah and up to 15% Marsanne and Roussanne; whites of only Marsanne and Roussanne.
- Cornas AOC - reds of Syrah only.
- Saint-Péray AOC - sparkling and still whites of only Marsanne and Roussanne.

Northern Rhône reds are often identified by their signature aromas of green olive and smoky bacon.

== Southern Rhône ==
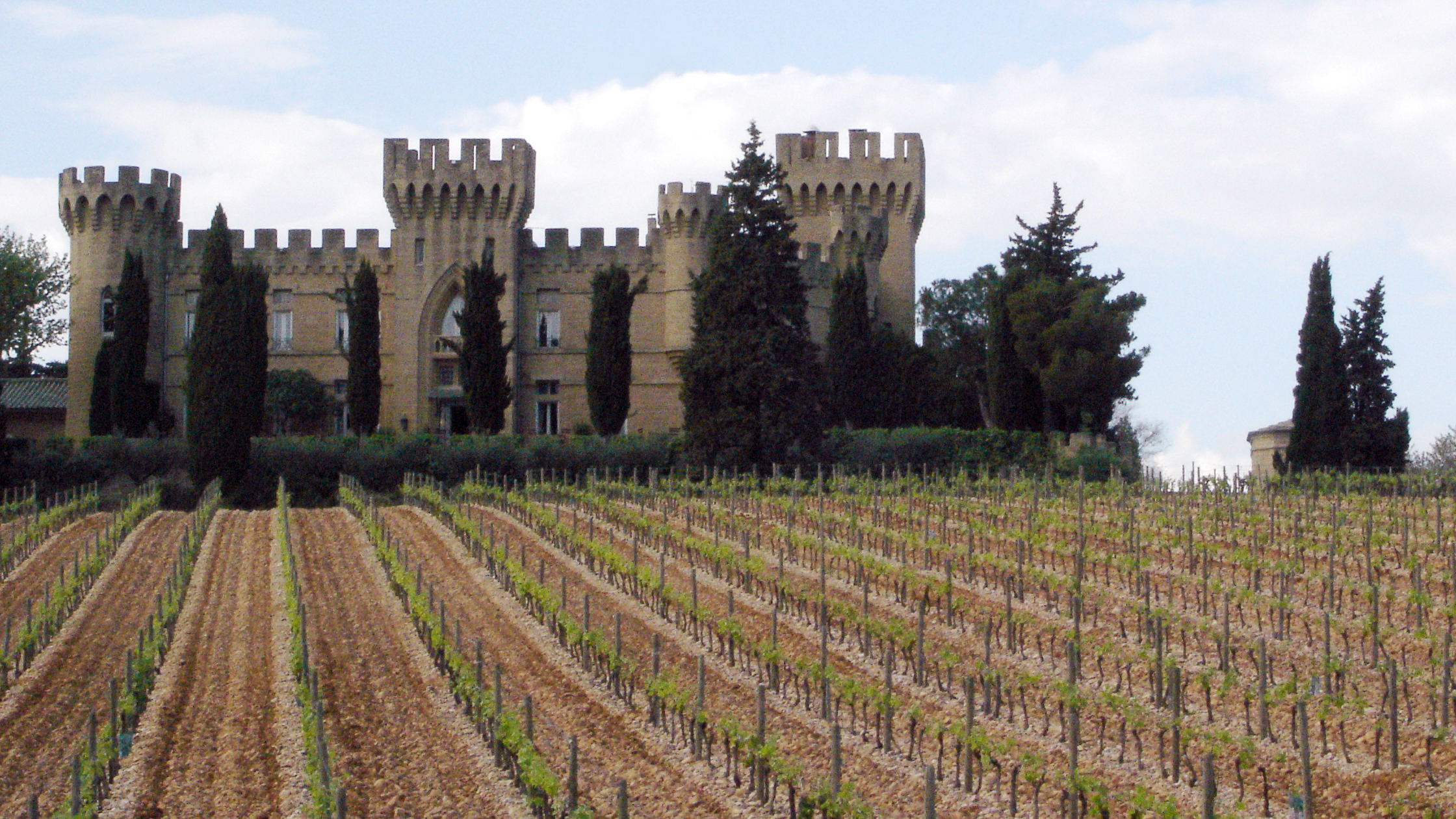
A vineyard in Châteauneuf-du-Pape, in southern Rhône.

The southern Rhône sub-region has a more Mediterranean climate with milder winters and hot summers. Drought can be a problem in the area, but limited irrigation is permitted. The differing terroirs, together with the rugged landscape which partly protects the valleys from the Mistral, produce microclimates which give rise to a wide diversity of wines. A feature of the cultivation of the region is the use of large pebbles around the bases of the vines to absorb the heat of the sun during the day to keep the vines warm at night when, due to the cloudless skies, there is often a significant drop in temperature.

The southern Rhône's most famous red wine is Châteauneuf-du-Pape, a blend containing up to 19 varieties of wine grapes (ten red and nine white) as permitted by the Châteauneuf-du-Pape AOC rules. Other nearby AOC regions including Côtes du Vivarais AOC, Grignan-Les Adhemar AOC, Lirac AOC, Tavel AOC, Vacqueyras AOC, and Ventoux AOC may contain even more varieties in the blend. Gigondas AOC, on the other hand, is predominantly made from Grenache noir and has a more restricted set of permitted grapes. Depending on the specific AOC rules, grapes blended into southern Rhône reds may include Grenache, Syrah, Mourvèdre, Carignan and Cinsaut. Similar wine blends globally are known as GSM, after the first three varietals. The reds from the left bank are full bodied, rich in tannins while young, and are characterized by their aromas of prune, undergrowth, chocolate and ripe black fruit. The right bank reds are slightly lighter and fruitier.

Southern Rhône appellations:

- Côtes du Vivarais AOC
- Côtes du Rhône AOC
- Côtes-du-Rhône Villages AOC
- Côtes du Rhône Villages (named villages)
- Châteauneuf-du-Pape AOC
- Grignan-Les Adhemar AOC
- Vacqueyras AOC
- Rasteau AOC
- Cairanne AOC
- Gigondas AOC
- Vinsobres AOC
- Lirac AOC
- Beaumes de Venise AOC
- Muscat de Beaumes de Venise AOC
- Tavel AOC
- Laudun AOC

White wines from the southern Rhône sub-region, such as in Châteauneuf-du-Pape whites, are also typically blends of several wine grapes. These may include Ugni blanc, Roussanne, Bourboulenc, Picpoul, and Clairette. Since about 1998 Viognier is increasingly being used and is also appearing as a single varietal.

Tavel AOC, produced in the special microclimate of the sillon rhodanien (the furrow of the Rhône) by some thirty producers including Château d'Aqueria, Domaine Maby, Domaine de la Mordorée, Domaine Pelaquier, is an elite rosé only, which has been referred to as 'the wine of kings".

Fortified wines (vin doux naturel) are made in the Muscat de Beaumes-de-Venise AOC and Rasteau AOCs.

== Côtes du Rhône ==
Côtes du Rhône AOC is an AOC that covers both the northern and southern sub-regions of Rhône. Typically it is only used if the wine does not qualify for an appellation that can command a higher price. Therefore, almost all Côtes du Rhône AOC is produced in southern Rhône, since the northern sub-region is covered by well-known appellations and also is much smaller in terms of total vineyard surface. This AOC is also used by the commercial blenders (négociants) who buy grapes in bulk from various parts of the region to bottle, distribute, and export on an industrial scale. This nevertheless makes it the most commonly known, produced, and distributed appellation of the region. Produce from vineyards surrounding certain villages including Laudun and others may be labeled Côtes-du-Rhône Villages AOC.

Red Côtes du Rhône is usually dominated by Grenache.

== Other appellations ==
Other appellations falling outside the main Rhône area in terms of wine styles but administratively within it are Clairette de Die AOC, Crémant de Die AOC, Grignan-Les Adhemar AOC, Luberon AOC, Ventoux AOC, Côtes du Vivarais AOC. These are more similar to the wines of Provence. In 2004 ten new appellations were officially added to the Rhône region, 9 in the Gard and one in the Vaucluse, which largely parallel the wines of Southern Rhône proper, while two appellations were discontinued for reasons of reforesting and urban encroachment.

In 2004, Costières de Nîmes AOC, which previously had been counted as part of eastern Languedoc, was also attached to the Rhône wine region. In that year, INAO moved the responsibility for oversight of this appellation's wine to the regional committee of the Rhône valley. Local producers of Côtes du Rhône-styled wines made from Syrah and Grenache lobbied for this change since the local winemaking traditions did not coincide with administrative borders, and presumably due to the greater prestige of Rhône wines in the marketplace. Such changes of borders between wine regions are very rare.

== Other wines ==
Many private wineries also produce wines including sparkling wines and fortified wines, single varietals - particularly from the Syrah grape - and even brandies. These wines usually do not conform to the rules of a VDQS or AOC. They are usually only sold on the premises.

Several wineries produce wines from organically cultivated vines that, provided they comply with the rules for varieties, plant spacing, pruning and maximum yield, are admitted in the AOC.

The excess production of many domains and cooperatives is released as Vin de Pays which are marketed as Vin de Pays du Gard, Vin de Pays de Vaucluse, etc., or are sold to blenders of wine from the European Union, and mass food distribution for sale as own brands. Excess wines of the lowest quality, Vin de Table, occasionally become part of the wine lake and are reprocessed into industrial alcohol.

== Classification ==
Rhône does not have an official classification using "Grand cru", or similar terms, in contrast to Bordeaux or Burgundy. There are, however, differences between the Rhône AOCs regarding their geographical delineation and naming practices, which, in turn, provide a classification into four distinct categories:

- Côtes du Rhône only displays the region, and may be used in the entire wine region, in 171 communes. For some communes, this is the only allowed AOC. It is therefore the lowest classification for Rhône AOC wine.
- Côtes du Rhône-Villages is an AOC allowed for 95 communes, with a higher minimum requirement for grape maturity than basic Côtes du Rhône. It is therefore a higher classification. In general, the appellation does not allow the village name to be displayed.
- Côtes du Rhône-Villages together with village name is allowed for 20 communes that have been deemed to be of a higher standard than the majority.
- Cru are the 16 named appellations which display only the name of the cru, and not Côtes du Rhône. These include the most famous Rhône wines, such as Hermitage, Côte-Rôtie and Châteauneuf-du-Pape. There is no official classification differentiating between different crus, but the market prices of some AOCs are much higher than others. Sometimes, individual vineyard names (such as La Landonne within the Côte-Rôtie appellation) are displayed on the labels. Most producers will only do this for top wines, but vineyard-labelled wines enjoy no different official status from other cru wines.

== Grape varieties ==
Different grape varieties are allowed in the different Rhône appellations; a few appellations are single variety appellations, while the regional Côtes du Rhône appellation allow 21 different varieties. In most cases, Northern Rhône appellations allow many fewer varieties than those of Southern Rhône. In many appellation regulations, a division is made into main grape varieties (indicated by "M"), supplementary varieties (indicated by "S"), and accessory varieties (indicated by "(A)").

Variety	Northern Crus														
Variety	Condrieu, Château-Grillet	Cornas	Côte-Rôtie	Hermitage, Crozes-Hermitage		Saint-Joseph		Saint-Péray	Coteaux de Die	Cremant de Die	Chatillon-en-Diois		Clairette de Die		
Variety				Red	White	Red	White		White	Sparkling	White	Red & Rose	Sparkling (AM)	Sparkling	Sparkling Rose (AM)
Marsanne				(A) max 15%	M 0-100%	(A) max 10%	M 0-100%	M 0-100%							
Roussanne				(A) max 15%	M 0-100%	(A) max 10%	M 0-100%	M 0-100%							
Syrah		M 100%	M min 80%	M min 85%		M min 90%						S 0-25%			
Viognier	M 100%		(A) max 20%												
Clairette blanche									M 100%	M min 55%			(A)	M 100%	(A)
Aligoté										S max 10%	M 0-100%				
Muscat a petite grains										S max 5-10%			M min 75%		M min 75%
Chardonnay											M 0-100%				
Pinot Noir												S 0-25%			
Gamay												M min 75%			(A) max 10%

Variety	Regional appellations					Southern crus										
Variety	Côtes du Rhône		Côtes du Rhône Villages			Beaumes de Venise	Châteauneuf-du-Pape	Gigondas	Lirac		Muscat de Beaumes de Venise	Rasteau	Tavel	Vacqueyras		
Variety	Red and rosé	White	Red	Rosé	White	Beaumes de Venise	Châteauneuf-du-Pape	Gigondas	Red and rosé	White	Muscat de Beaumes de Venise	Rasteau	Tavel	Red	Rosé	White
Bourboulenc	(A)	M		(A)	M	(A)	M	(A)		M		(A)	M	(A)	(A)	M
Brun Argenté (locally called Camarèse or Vaccarèse)	(A)		(A)	(A)		(A)	M	(A)				(A)		(A)	(A)	
Calitor													(A)			
Carignan	(A)		(A)	(A)		(A)			(A)			(A)	(A)	(A)	(A)	
Carignan blanc													(A)			
Cinsaut	(A)		(A)	(A)		(A)	M	(A)	M			(A)	M	(A)	M	
Clairette blanche	(A)	M		(A)	M	(A)	M	(A)		M		(A)	M	(A)	(A)	M
Clairette rose	(A)			(A)		(A)	M	(A)				(A)	M	(A)	(A)	
Counoise	(A)		(A)	(A)		(A)	M	(A)				(A)		(A)	(A)	
Grenache blanc	(A)	M		(A)	M	(A)	M	(A)		M		M	M	(A)	(A)	M
Grenache gris	(A)			(A)		(A)	M	(A)				M	M	(A)	(A)	
Grenache noir	M		M	M		M	M	M	M			M	M	M	M	
Marsanne	(A)	M		(A)	M	(A)		(A)	(A)	(A)		(A)		(A)	(A)	M
Marselan	(A)										(A)					
Mourvèdre	S		S	S		(A)	M	S	M			(A)	M	S	M	
Muscardin	(A)		(A)	(A)		(A)	M	(A)				(A)		(A)	(A)	
Muscat Blanc à Petits Grains											M					
Muscat Rouge à Petits Grains											M					
Picardan							M									
Piquepoul blanc	(A)	(A)		(A)	(A)	(A)	M	(A)	(A)	(A)		(A)	M			
Piquepoul gris							M						M			
Piquepoul noir	(A)		(A)	(A)		(A)	M	(A)				(A)	M	(A)	(A)	
Roussanne	(A)	M		(A)	M	(A)	M	(A)	(A)	(A)		(A)		(A)	(A)	M
Syrah	S		S	S		S	M	S	M			(A)	M	S	M	
Terret noir	(A)		(A)	(A)		(A)	M	(A)				(A)		(A)	(A)	
Ugni blanc	(A)	(A)		(A)	(A)	(A)		(A)	(A)	(A)		(A)				
Viognier	(A)	M		(A)	M	(A)		(A)	(A)	(A)		(A)		(A)	(A)	M

== See also ==
- List of wine-producing regions
- French Wine
- Official Rhône wine trade association website
- INAO AOC/AOP IGP Vin Specifications
