= Grenache blanc =

Variety of grape

- Grape (Vitis)
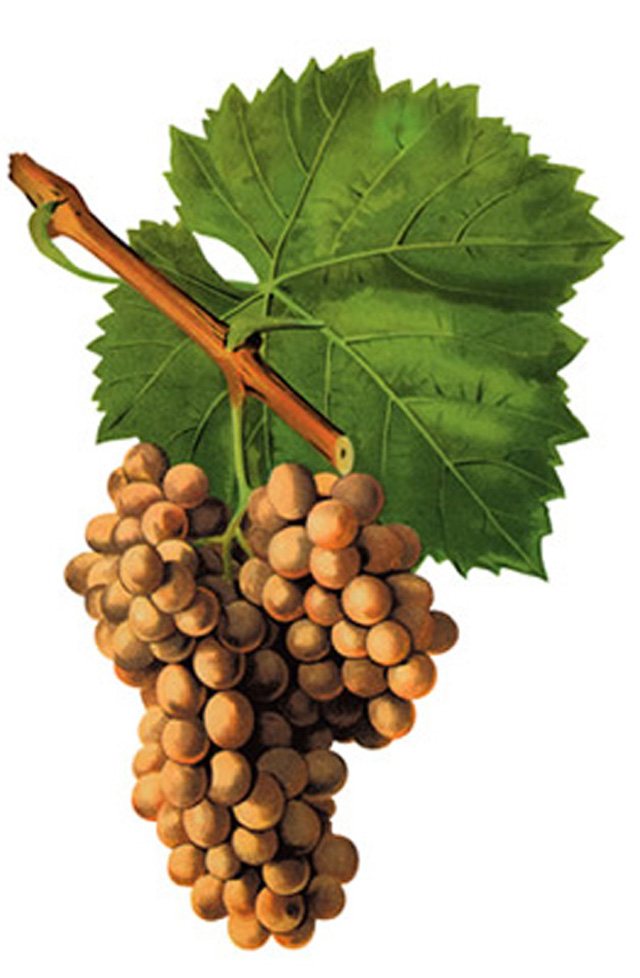
- Grenache blanc in Viala & Vermorel
- Color of berry skin: Blanc
- Species: Vitis vinifera
- Also called: Garnacha blanca, Garnatxa blanca, White Grenache (more)
- Origin: Spain
- Notable regions: Spain, Rhône valley and Châteauneuf-du-Pape
- VIVC number: 4457

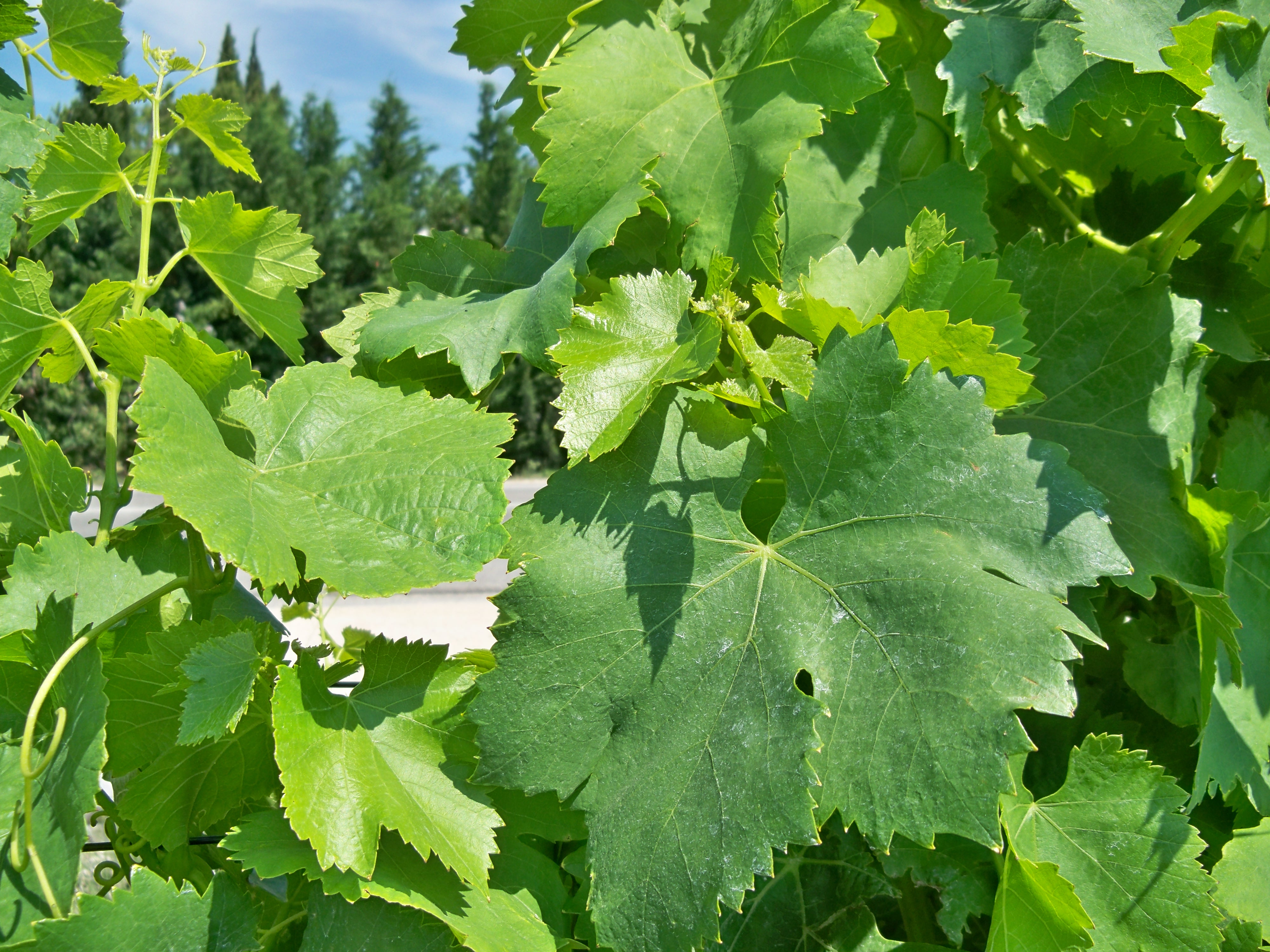
Leaves of Grenache blanc vines

Grenache blanc (French pronunciation: [ɡʁənaʃ blɑ̃]; also known as garnatxa blanca in Catalonia) is a variety of white wine grape that is related to the red grape Grenache. It is mostly found in Rhône wine blends and in northeast Spain. Its wines are characterized by high alcohol and low acidity, with citrus and or herbaceous notes. Its vigor can lead to overproduction and flabbiness. However, if yields are controlled, it can contribute flavor and length to blends, particularly with Roussanne. Since the 1980s, it has been the fifth most widely planted white wine grape in France after Ugni blanc, Chardonnay, Semillon and Sauvignon blanc.

== History ==
Grenache blanc is thought to have originated as a mutation of the red version of Grenache in Spain. It then spread across the Pyrenees to France, finding a second home in the Rhône.

== Wine regions ==
Grenache blanc is an important variety in the French wine region of the Rhône Valley, often blended with Roussanne in wines and even being included in some red wines. It is a major component in the white wines of the Châteauneuf-du-Pape and Côtes du Rhône AOCs. Up to 10% Grenache blanc is permitted to be included in the red wines of the Côtes du Rhône Villages AOC. In the Rivesaltes AOC, the grape is used as a blending component in some of the region's vin doux naturel wines. Nearly half of all Grenache blanc plantings in France are located in the Roussillon region where the grape is often blended with Roussanne, Marsanne, Viognier and Rolle. In the upper Agly valley, varietal terroir driven examples are starting to be produced. In white Châteauneuf-du-Pape, Grenache blanc provides fruitiness and fatness to a blend that often includes Roussanne, Picpoul, Bourboulenc and Clairette blanche.

=== Other old world regions ===
In Spain it is mostly found in the Spanish wine regions along the Pyrenees, particularly in Navarra and the Terra Alta region in Catalonia. It is also widely planted in the Priorat, Alella and Aragon. It is permitted in the white wines of Rioja but is not widely used due to the tendency of the must to oxidize easily.

In Australia the variety known as "White Grenache" was identified by ampelographer Paul Truel as Biancone in 1976.

== Winemaking ==
Grenache blanc responds best to low fermentation temperatures which produces a fresh, dill-scented wine in its youth. The grape is fairly flexible in winemaking and can be exposed to malolactic fermentation, extended skin maceration, lees stirring as well as oak aging. In addition to being blended with Roussanne, Grenache blanc is sometimes blended with Muscat and made in a varietal style.

== Synonyms ==
Alicante blanca, Belan, Feher Grenache, Garnacha blanca (Spanish), Garnatxa blanca (Catalan), Vernatxa blanca (Catalan) in Tierras del Ebro, Rool Grenache, Silla blanc, Sillina blanc and White Grenache. Plain 'Grenache' or 'Garnacha' almost always refers to the red variety of Grenache.
