= Marsanne =

Variety of grape

- Grape (Vitis)
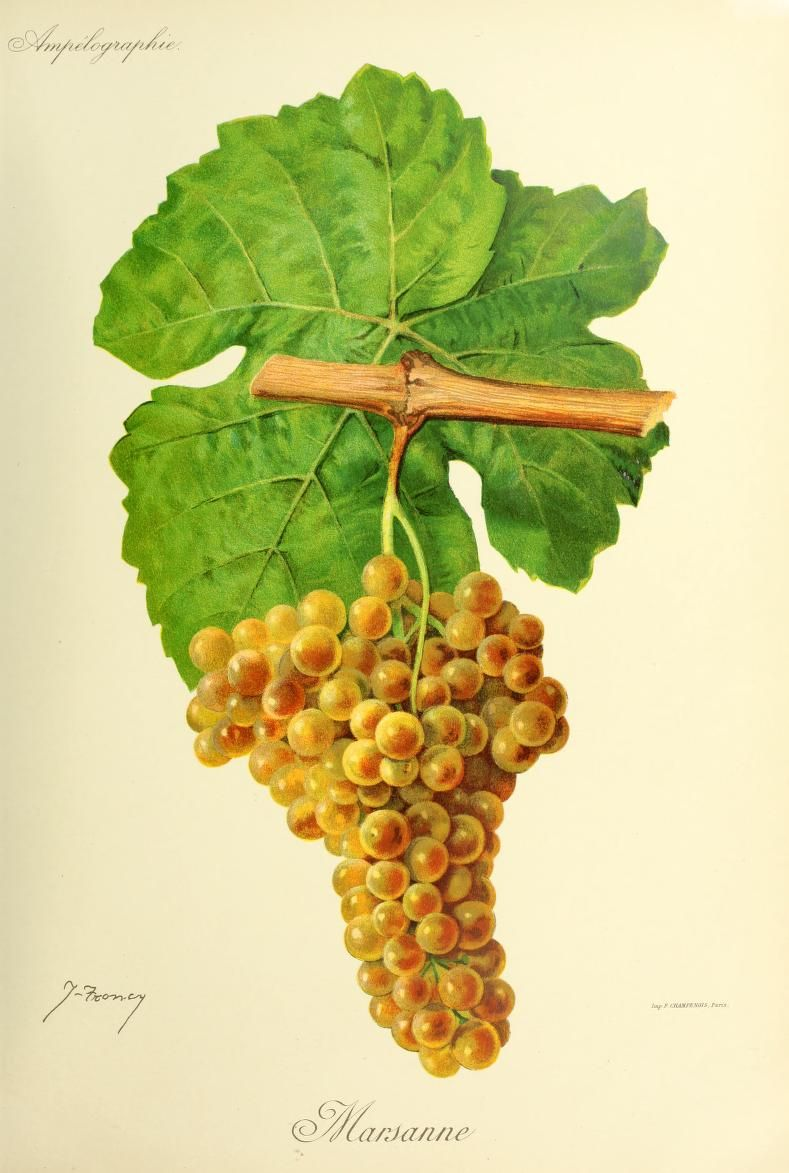
- Color of berry skin: Blanc
- Species: Vitis vinifera
- Also called: See list of synonyms
- Origin: France
- Notable regions: Rhône, Australia, California
- Notable wines: White Hermitage
- VIVC number: 7434

Marsanne (French pronunciation: [maʁsan]) is a white wine grape, most commonly found in the Northern Rhône region. It is often blended with Roussanne. In Savoie the grape is known as grosse roussette. Outside France it is also grown in Switzerland (where it is known as ermitage blanc or just ermitage), Spain (where it is known as Marsana), Australia, New Zealand, Canada and the United States.

== Wine regions ==
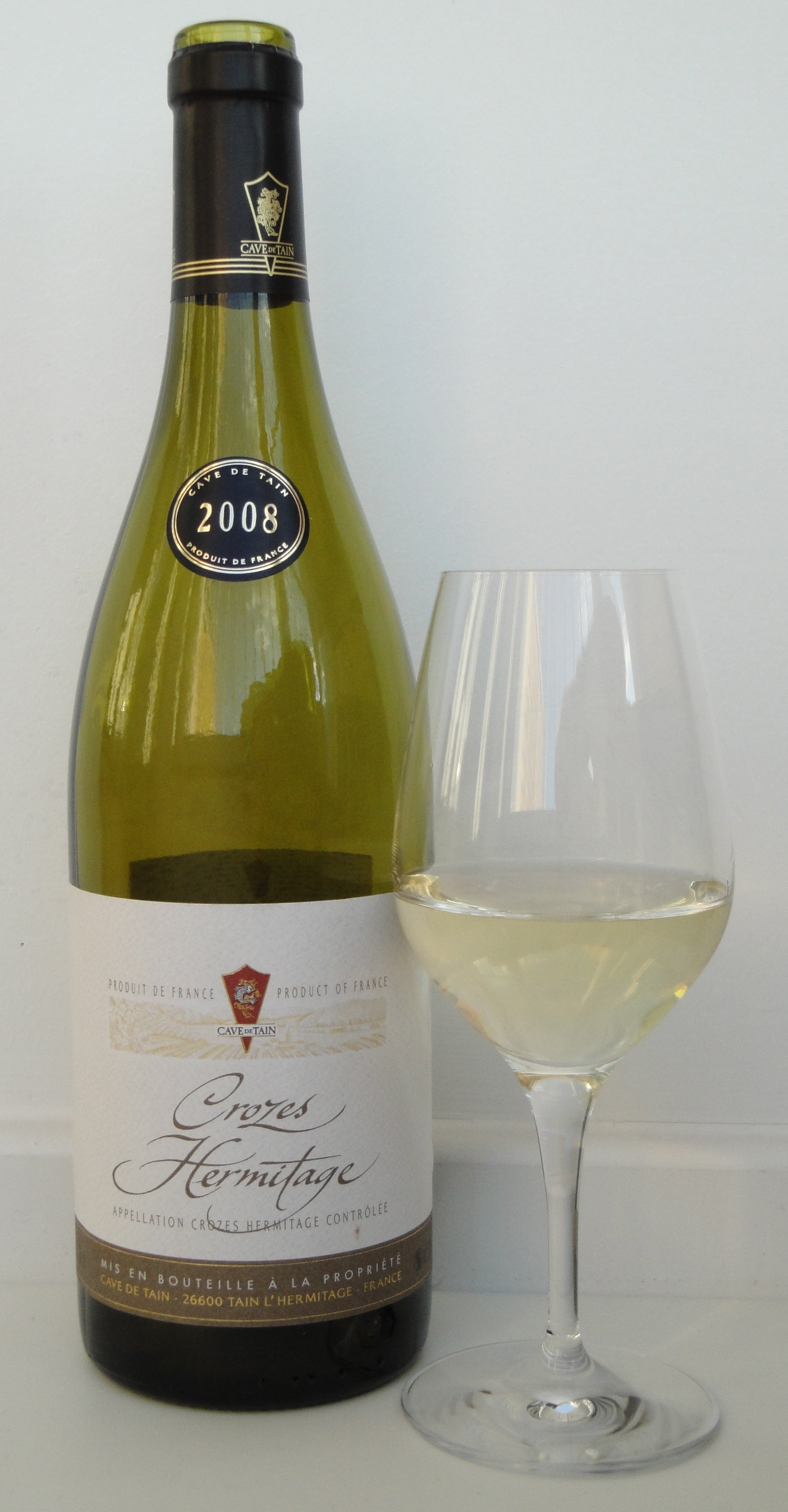
A white Crozes-Hermitage produced from 100% Marsanne. As is the case for most French AOC wines, the variety is not mentioned on the front label.

The grape most likely originated in the Northern Rhône region where it is widely planted today, more precisely in the village and abbey of Marsanne (Drôme). It is a principal component of the white wines from the Hermitage, Crozes-Hermitage and Saint-Joseph AOCs. It is the most widely planted white wine grape in the Hermitage AOC, where it is often blended with Roussanne. Along with Roussanne, up to 15% of Marsanne can be added to the red wine of Hermitage under Appellation d'origine contrôlée (AOC) regulations. In the Saint-Péray AOC, it is used for both still and sparkling wine production. In the Southern Rhône, Marsanne is not one of the white grapes permitted in the Châteauneuf-du-Pape AOC, although Roussanne is. (In Châteauneuf-du-Pape blends, Clairette blanc adds similar characteristics as Marsanne.) It can be found in some white wines from the Côtes du Rhône AOC. Although Marsanne is mostly made into a dry wine, it is commonly made into a sweet wine in Valais, Switzerland and some producers in the Rhône have also experimented with making a dessert-style straw wine with Marsanne.

Outside the Northern Rhône region, Marsanne is also found in Savoie and in the Languedoc where it is often blended with Viognier. It is a permitted grape in the Provence wine of Cassis though it is not widely used.

=== Outside France ===
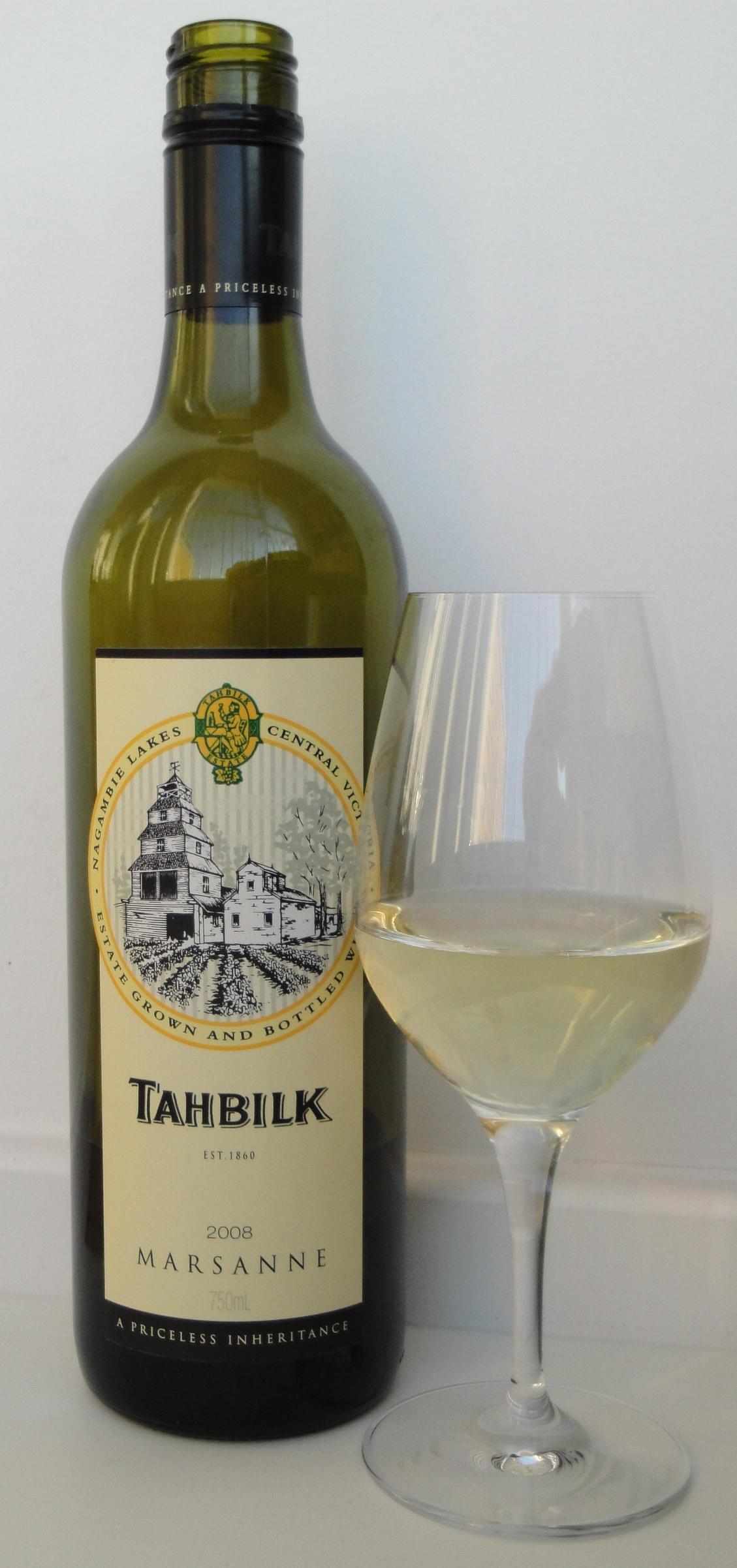
A Marsanne from Tahbilk in Australia.

In Australia, the grape was first planted in Victoria in the 1860s. The Victorian vineyard of Tahbilk has Marsanne vines which date back to 1927 and are some of the oldest in the world. In Switzerland, Marsanne is grown in Valais where it is locally known as Ermitage and made into both sweet wines and dry steely white wines with high alcohol levels.

In British Columbia and Washington State, plantings of Marsanne continue to increase as producers blend it with Roussanne and Viognier. Varietal Marsanne from Washington has been shown to have notes of ripe white peach and spiced pear. In California, the Rhone Rangers movement introduced Marsanne to more consumers in wines that are often blended with Roussanne and Viognier. In Spain there are some plantings of Marsanne in the northeast. In New Jersey Unionville Vineyards grows Marsanne, Roussanne, and other Rhone varieties. Sommeliers have found that the vintage in relation to the climate has exaggerated effects on Marsanne blends in the United States. In Michigan Domaine Berrien Cellars is the sole non-California member of the Rhone Rangers and pioneered the planting of Marsanne, Roussanne, Viognier, and Syrah in 1992. Domaine Berrien Cellars credits the success of their award-winning Marsanne and Oak Marsanne varietals to the unique microclimate of the Lake Michigan Shore AVA.

In New Zealand, Marsanne is grown in the East of the North Island. In Gisborne, Doug and Delwyn Bell grow Marsanne which is used to produce the "Allison" Gisborne Marsanne for Coopers Creek. In nearby Hastings Marsanne is blended with Viognier and fermented in aged French oak barrels which give a richness and complexity without introducing intrusive oak notes.

== Viticulture ==
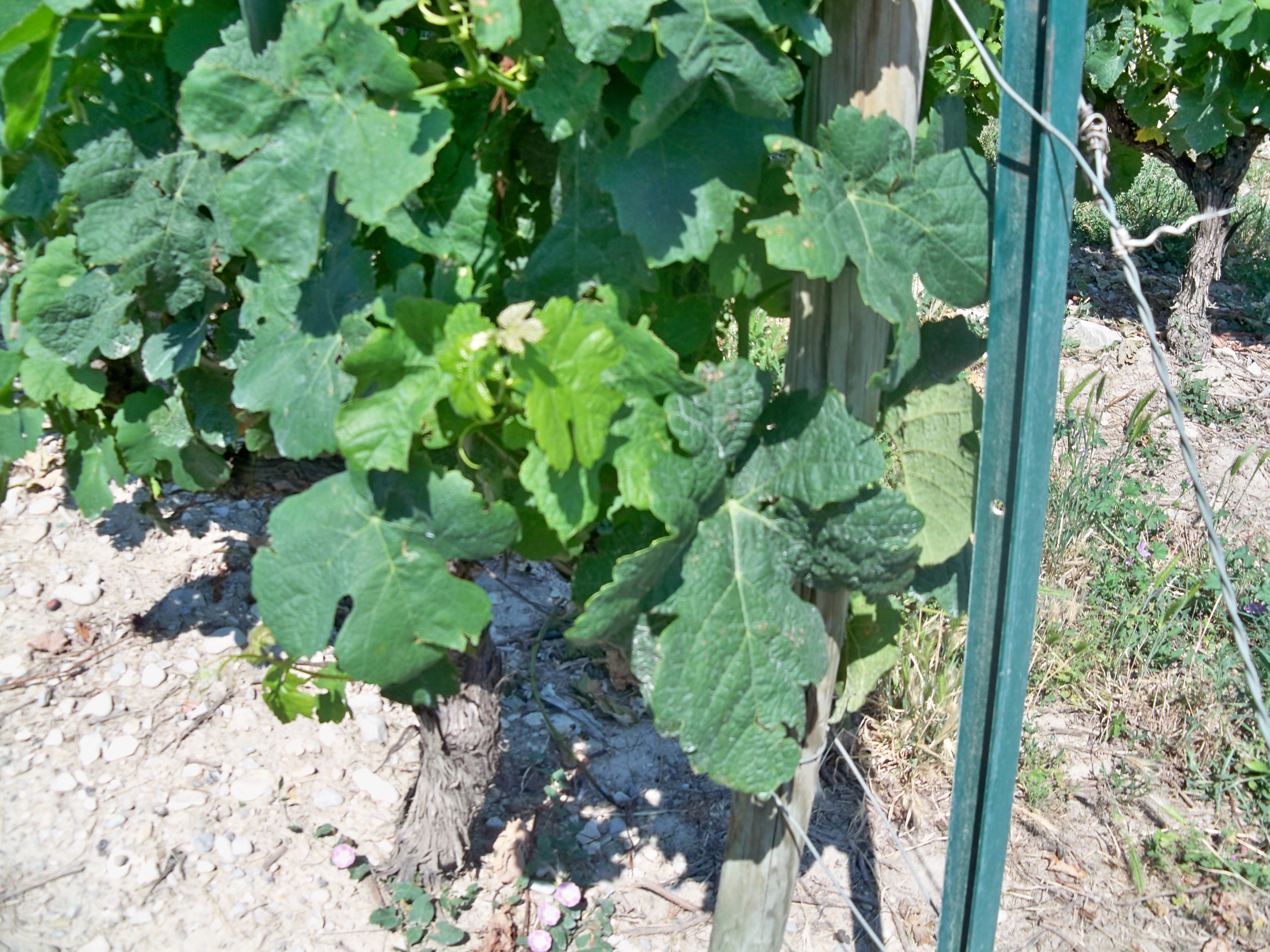
Leaves of Marsanne vines.

While not as temperamental as the Roussanne grape, Marsanne is prone to underperform in less than ideal sites. In climates that are too hot, the grape can overripen and produce wine that is very flabby. In places that are too cool, the grape cannot ripen fully and produces wine with a bland and neutral flavor. In order to maintain a high level of acidity, winemakers try to harvest Marsanne just before it hits full ripeness. Some Australian winemakers prefer to let the grape hang longer on the vine to increase the alcohol level of the wine and its aging potential.

== Wines ==
Marsanne produces deeply colored wines that are rich and nutty, with hints of spice and pear. The wines can be high in alcohol and can be oak aged to develop more body. As Marsanne ages, the wine takes on an even darker color and the flavors can become more complex and concentrated with an oily, honeyed texture. Aromas of nuts and quince can also develop.

== Synonyms ==
Marsanne is also known under the synonyms Avilleran, Avilleron, Champagne Piacentina, Ermitage, Ermitage Blanc, Ermitazh, Grosse Roussette, Hermitage, Johannisberg, Marsan Belyi, Marsanne Blanche, Marzanne, Metternich, Rousseau, Roussette de Saint Peray, Roussette Grosse, White Hermitage, and Zrmitazh.
