= Saint-Péray AOC =

French wine

Saint-Péray (French pronunciation: [sɛ̃ peʁɛ]) is a French wine Appellation d'Origine Contrôlée (AOC) in the northern Rhône wine region of France. Located in the southernmost part of Northern Rhône, the appellation is very small and not widely known. The production is mainly white sparkling wine, somewhat like Champagne. However, some still wine is also made. All Saint-Péray wine is white.

== History ==
Pliny mentions the wine of Saint-Péray in his Natural History, and Napoleon Bonaparte is to have said that he, when he was a young cadet in Valence, had his first experience of wine, drinking Saint-Péray. In the wine's prime in the 19th century, its sparkling wine was held in higher regard than Champagne itself, but since then it's been down hill for the appellation. It was established as an official appellation in 1936 by which time it had shrunk to the meager 55 hectares.

== Grapes and wine ==
There are two allowed grapes in Saint-Péray, Marsanne and Roussanne, with the former covering 90% of the planted area. A third grape "Roussette" is alleged to also be grown, but apparently only the wine growers themselves distinguish this from Roussanne.

=== Winemaking ===
Saint-Péray wines are meant to be drunk young, with 4/5 of the production being sparkling wine after the Methode Champenoise. However, advances are being made with still wine.

=== Saint-Péray Mousseux AOC ===
Saint-Péray Mousseaux is a wine-growing AOC in the northern Rhône wine region of France. The wines are exclusively white sparkling wines, made from the Marsanne and Roussanne grapes. Still wines from the same region and grapes are made under the appellation Saint-Péray AOC.
