= Cellier des Dauphins =

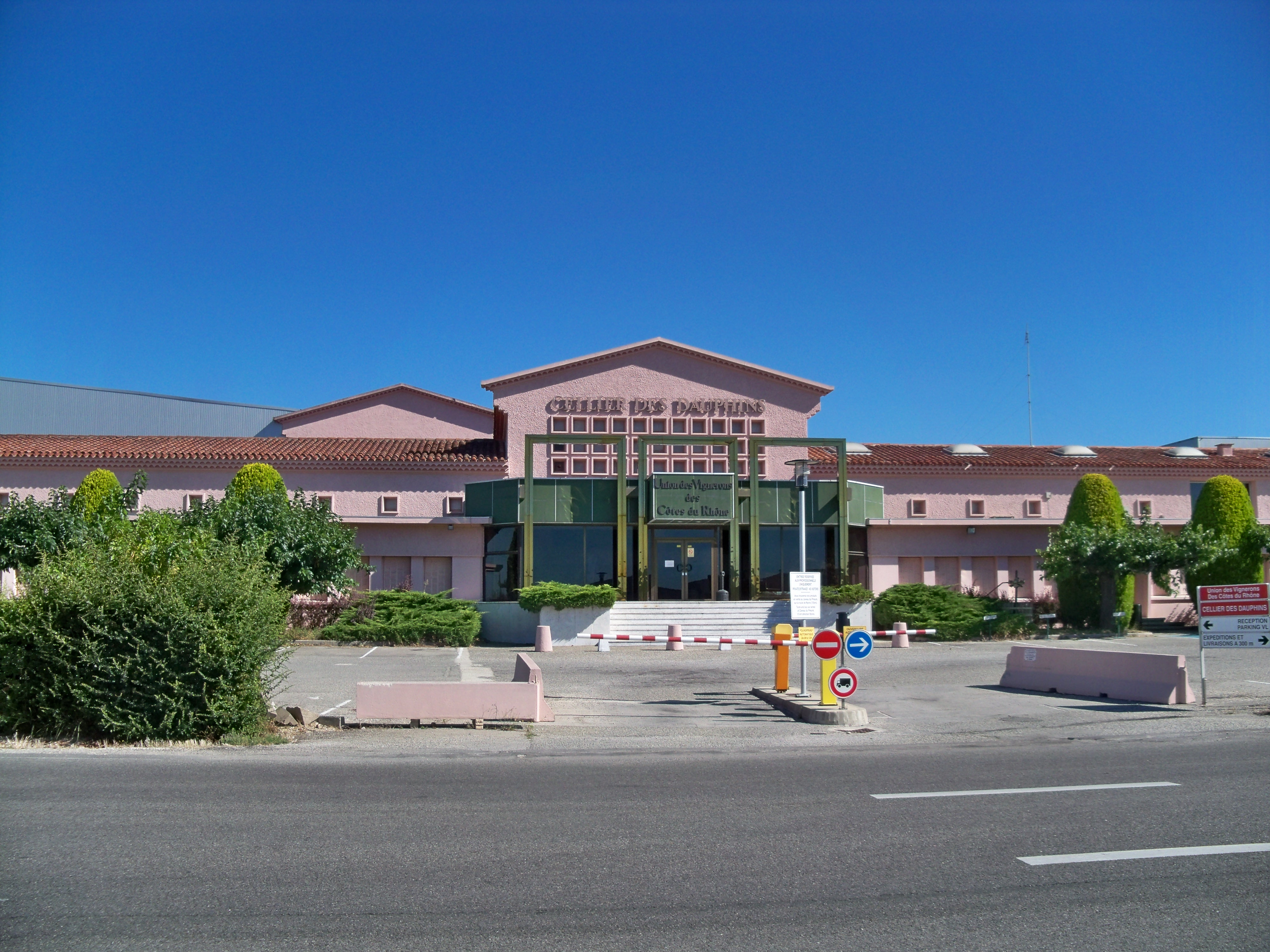
Entrance to the Cellier des Dauphins complex in Tulette.

Cellier des Dauphins is a union of Côtes du Rhône winemakers in France. It unites thirteen local cooperatives, and is headquartered in Tulette.

== Business history ==
Established in 1963, the company had 110 employees as of 2014. Total annual production is 390 000 hectoliters of wine produced by thirteen industry cooperatives representing 3000 growers who pool their production.

Celliers des Dauphins is the largest winemaker in the Rhône area, overseeing 18 000 hectares of vineyards in the region.

In 2001, the company sold €90 million worth of product, with 20% of sales in the export market.
