= Clairette rose =

Variety of grape

A sketch of clairette rose grapes

Clairette rose is a grape variety that is listed among the accessory varieties in the Côtes du Rhône AOC and Côtes du Rhône-Villages AOC. Clairette rose is the pink mutation of Clairette blanche. It has no officially recognized synonyms in the European Union.
