= Clairette blanche =

Variety of grape

- Grape (Vitis)
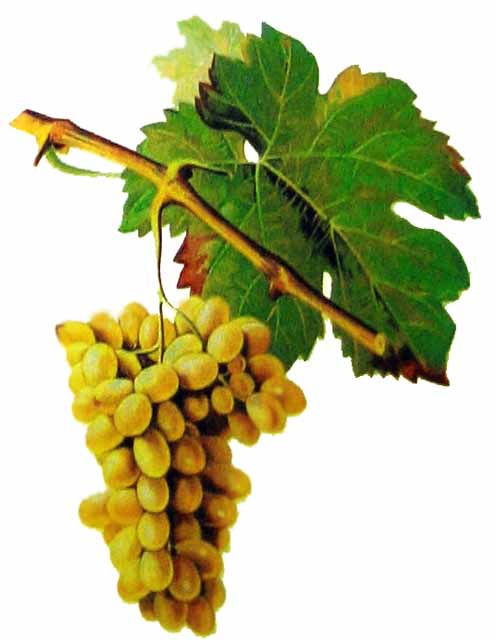
- Clairette in Viala & Vermorel
- Color of berry skin: Blanc
- Species: Vitis vinifera
- Also called: Clairette and several other synonyms
- Origin: France
- Notable regions: Provence and Rhône
- VIVC number: 2695

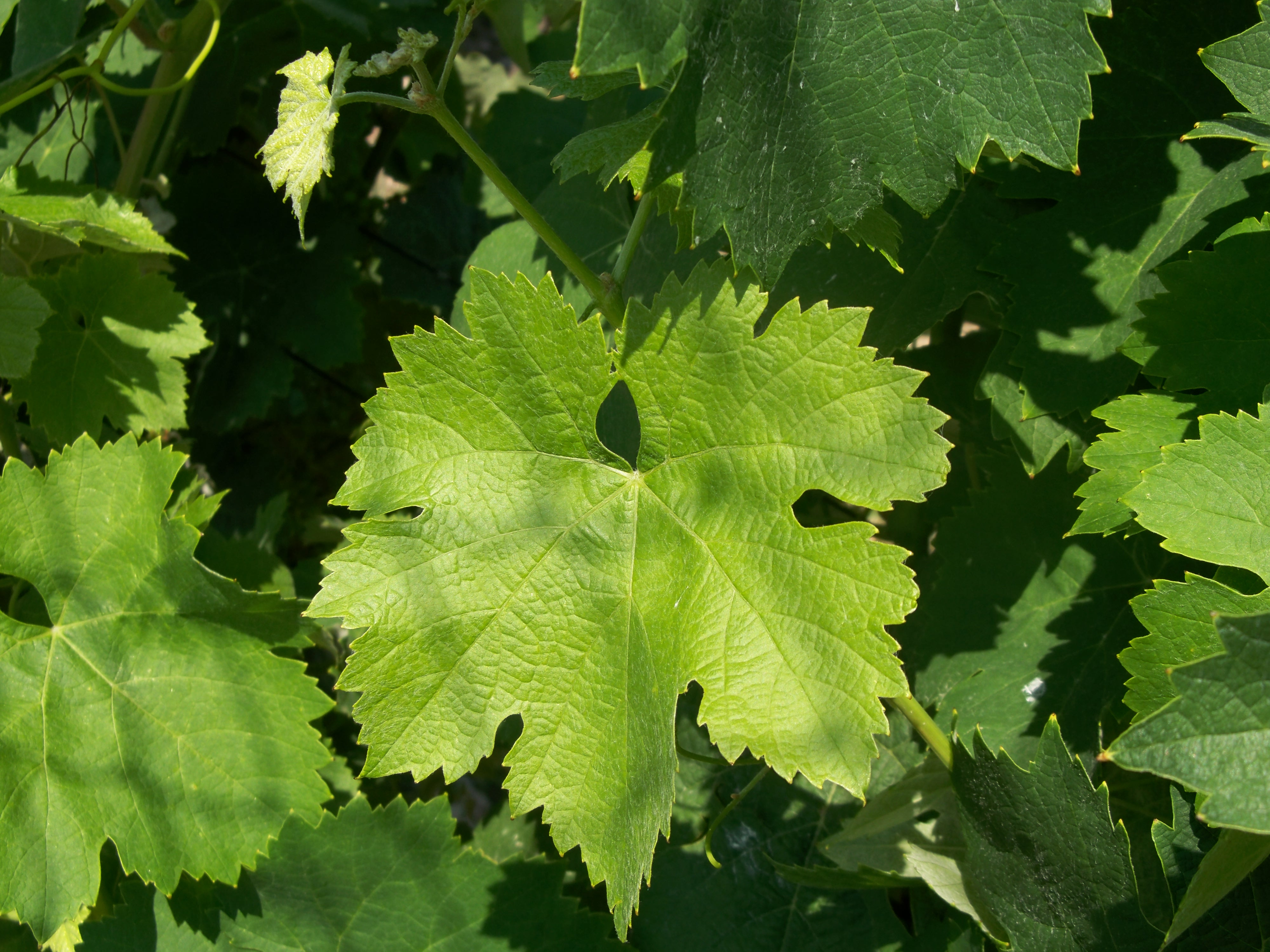
Leaves of Clairette vines

Clairette blanche (French pronunciation: [klɛʁɛt blɑ̃ʃ]) is a white wine grape variety most widely grown in the wine regions of Provence, Rhône and Languedoc in France. At the end of the 1990s, there were 3,000 hectares (7,400 acres) of Clairette blanche grown in France, although volumes are decreasing.

Clairette blanche was often used to make vermouth, to which it is suited as it produces wine high in alcohol and low in acidity, and therefore yields wines that are sometimes described as "flabby" and which tend to oxidize easily. These problems have sometimes been partially overcome by blending it with high-acid varieties such as Piquepoul blanc. It is allowed into many appellations of Southern Rhône, Provence and Languedoc. The white wines Clairette de Bellegarde and Clairette du Languedoc are made entirely from Clairette blanche, while the sparkling wine Clairette de Die can also contain Muscat Blanc à Petits Grains. Clairette blanche is frequently used in the blended white Vin de pays from Languedoc.

It is also one of the thirteen grape varieties permitted in the Châteauneuf-du-Pape appellation. With 2.5% of the appellation's vineyards planted in Clairette blanche in 2004 it is the most common white variety in Châteauneuf-du-Pape, slightly ahead of Grenache blanc.

Outside France it is also grown in South Africa for sparkling wine, Australia and Sardinia.

Clairette rose is the pink mutation of clairette blanche.

== Synonyms ==
Clairette blanche is also known under the synonyms AG Cleret, AG Kleret, Blanc Laffite, Blanket, Blanquette, Blanquette De Limoux, Blanquette du Midi, Blanquette Velue, Bon Afrara, Bou Afrara, Branquete, Cibade, Clairette, Clairette d'Aspiran, Clairette De Limoux, Clairette De Trans, Clairette Pointue, Clairette Pounchoudo, Clairette verte, Clarette, Clerette, Colle Musquette, Cotticour, Feher Clairette, Feher Kleret, Gaillard blanc, Granolata, Klaretto bianko, Kleret, Kleret Belyi, Kleret de Limu, Muscade, Olivette de Saint-Tropez, Osianka, Ousianka, Ovsyaika, Ovsyanka, Petit blanc, Petit Kleret, Petite Clairette, Poupe De Gate, Pti Blan d'Obena, Seidentraube, Shalos Zolotistyi, Uva Gijona, Vivsianka, Vivsyanca and Vivsyanka.

Clairette also appears in the name and synonyms of other grape varieties, including Bourboulenc and Ugni blanc.
