= Domaine du Vieux Télégraphe =

Winery in Châteauneuf-du-Pape, Rhône, France

Coordinates: 44.0429°N 4.8855°E

Domaine du Vieux Télégraphe is located within the Vaucluse department (red on map) in southeastern France

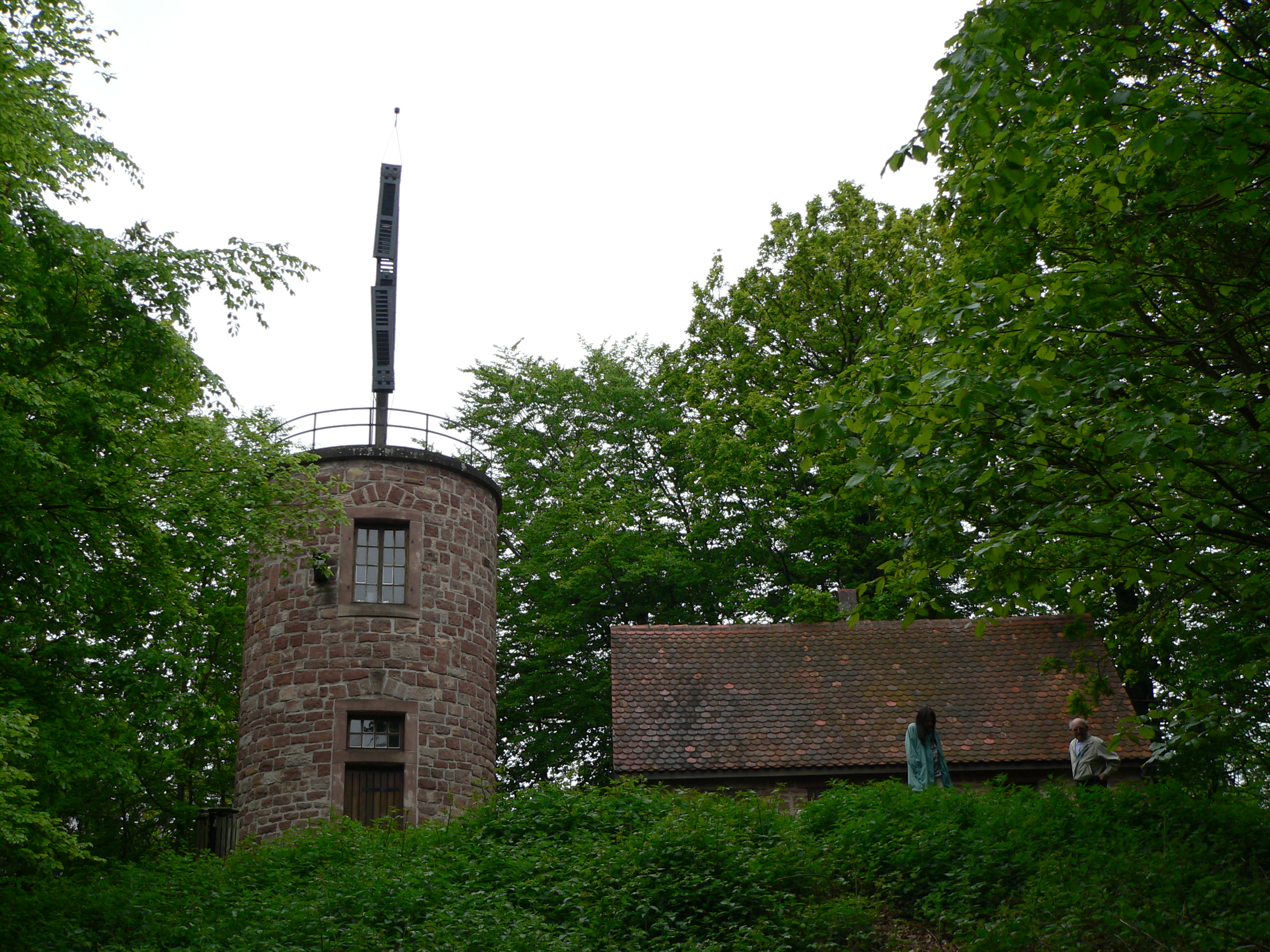
A Chappe semaphore tower near Saverne, France, illustrates what the Vieux Télégraphe may have looked like

Domaine du Vieux Télégraphe is a winery in the southern Rhône wine region, from the appellation Châteauneuf-du-Pape. The estate is a producer of red and white wine and estimated among the district's leading properties.

== History ==
Vines were initially planted on the Plateau de la Crau by Hippolyte Brunier in 1898, between the villages of Bédarrides, Châteauneuf and Courthezon, establishing the core of the present day vineyard of Vieux Télégraphe. There were expansions made over the following years, predominantly by the son Jules Brunier, who saw the vineyard extend nearly 17 hectares, and gave the estate its name, which he derived from a semaphore line tower that once stood in the vineyard. Following the phylloxera crisis, the task of rebuilding the property went to the next generation, in Henri Brunier, who eventually passed the estate on to his own sons, Daniel and Frederic, in 1986.

Additionally the Bruniers run the estates La Roquette, and in Gigondas, Les Pallières.

== Production ==
The vineyard area extends 70 hectares, composed of the grape varieties of 65% Grenache, 15% Syrah, 15% Mourvèdre, and the remaining 5% consisting of Cinsaut and some white varieties including Grenache Blanc, Clairette, Roussanne and Bourboulenc.

The Grand vin is the red Vieux Télégraphe, while a second wine is named Vieux Mas des Papes, containing wine from younger vines. In the 2002 vintage no Grand vin was released, only a label named Télégramme was produced, which has remained the name of the second wine in some markets. A white wine Vieux Télégraphe is also produced, with a second white also named Vieux Mas des Papes.

The Wine Advocate rated the 2007 Vieux Télégraphe at 96 points.

== See also ==
- Domaine du Vieux Lazaret
- Château Rayas
