= Brun Argenté =

Variety of grape

- Grape (Vitis)
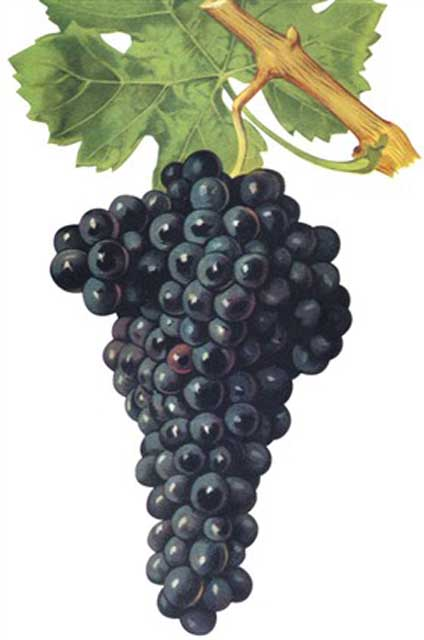
- Brun Argenté in Viala & Vermorel
- Color of berry skin: Noir
- Species: Vitis vinifera
- Also called: Vaccarèse
- Origin: France
- Notable regions: Rhône
- Notable wines: Châteauneuf-du-Pape
- VIVC number: 1706

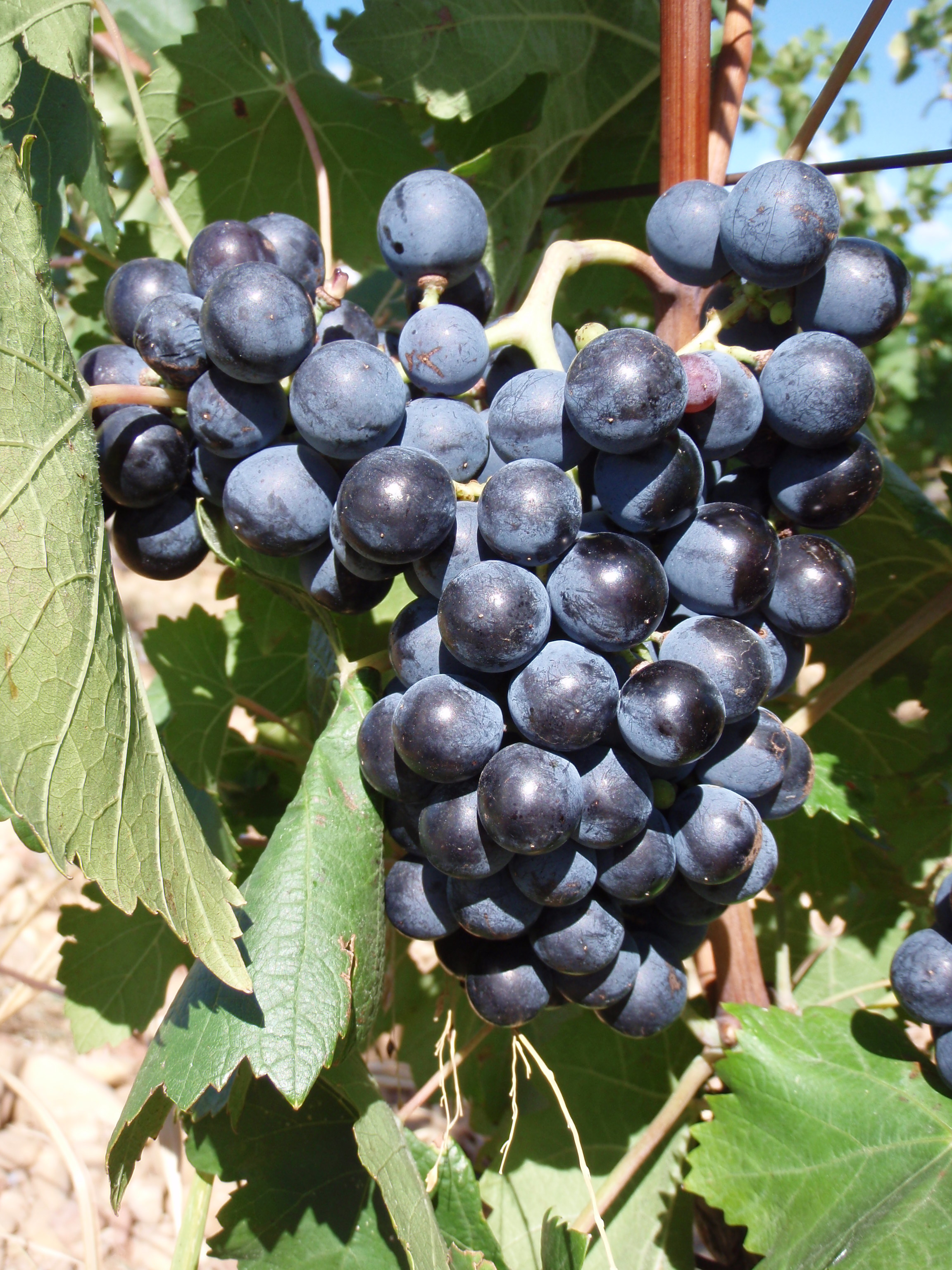
Brun Argenté grapes in Vaucluse.

Brun Argenté or Vaccarèse is a red wine grape that is grown primarily in the Rhone Valley in France. It is a permitted grape in the blend of Châteauneuf-du-Pape, where the name Vaccarèse is used. However, in 2004 only 0.15% of the appellation's surface was planted with the variety.

In similarity to Muscardin and Aubun, Brun Argenté is indigenous to this area of France.

Descriptions of the grape's character diverge somewhat. It has been described as having similar characteristics as Syrah, producing wines with a peppery and tannic structure, but also as similar to Cinsaut and a producer of light red wines.

The vine tends to bud late and is sensitive to downy mildew.

== Synonyms ==
Synonyms for Brun Argenté include Arzhente, Bakarezo, Bryun, Camarese, Camarezo, Camares du Gard, Kamaredyu Gard, Kamarez, Madeleine, Vacareze Blanc, Vaccarèse, Vaccareso, Vakarez.
