= Domaine Raspail-Ay =

French winery

Coordinates: 44.1658°N 4.9943°E

Domaine Raspail-Ay is a French wine winery in the southern Rhône wine region of France. It carries the Gigondas AOC appellation and is located in the commune of Gigondas, in Vaucluse. The red wine blend bottled at the estate is 80% Grenache, 15% Syrah and 5% Mourvèdre, and is generally 14%-15% alcohol. Domaine Raspail-Ay is a small estate of just 40 acres, and produces no more than 8,000 cases each vintage. The wine is dry, with medium/full body.

Being a little brother of Châteauneuf-du-Pape, Gigondas AOC is moderately prestigious and can age well when treated with care.
