= Picardan =

Variety of grape

- Grape (Vitis)
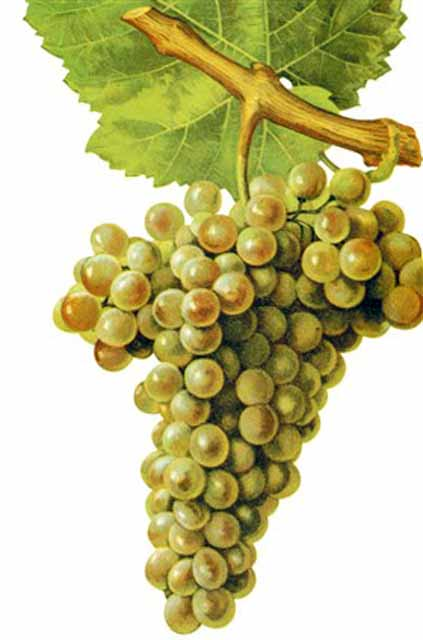
- Picardan in Viala & Vermorel
- Color of berry skin: Blanc
- Species: Vitis vinifera
- Also called: Araignan, Oeillade blanche, Picardan blanc
- Origin: France
- Notable regions: Southern Rhône
- Notable wines: Châteauneuf-du-Pape AOC
- VIVC number: 527

Picardan or Picardan blanc is a white wine grape which is one of 13 permitted blending grapes within the Châteauneuf-du-Pape AOC in Rhône wine region in France, although very little planted. The Vitis International Variety Catalogue previously listed Oeillade blanche as the primary name of the variety, but now identifies Araignan as the primary name. However, since the variety is practically unknown for any other use than the Châteauneuf-du-Pape blend, it most commonly goes under the name used for it in that appellation.

Picardan gives a wine which considered to be light and rather neutral in character.

== Wine ==
Picardan is also the name of a historical white wine from Languedoc, usually sweetish in character, traded in the late 17th and 18th centuries. It is supposed to have been produced from the varieties Clairette blanche and Piquepoul blanc.

== Synonyms and relationship to other grapes ==
Synonyms include: Aragnan, Aragnan blanc, Araignan, Araignan blanc, Gallet, Gallet blanc, Grosse Clairette, Milhaud blanc, Oeillade blanche, Papadoux, Picardan, Picardan blanc, Piquardan, Piquardant.

Picardan (but not Picardan blanc) is also a synonym for the white grape variety Bourboulenc, which is also found in Châteauneuf-du-Pape, and the dark-skinned variety Bouchales. Picardan noir is a synonym for Cinsaut and Bouchales.

Despite the synonym Oeillade blanche, Picardan is not a color mutation of the Languedoc and Provence wine grape Oeillade noire.
