= Damas noir =

Damas noir is a synonym or alternative name for several wine grape varieties including:

- Counoise
- Mourvèdre
- Prune de Cazouls
- Syrah
