= Vacqueyras AOC =

French wine region

Coordinates: 44°08′20″N 4°58′59″E

- Wine region
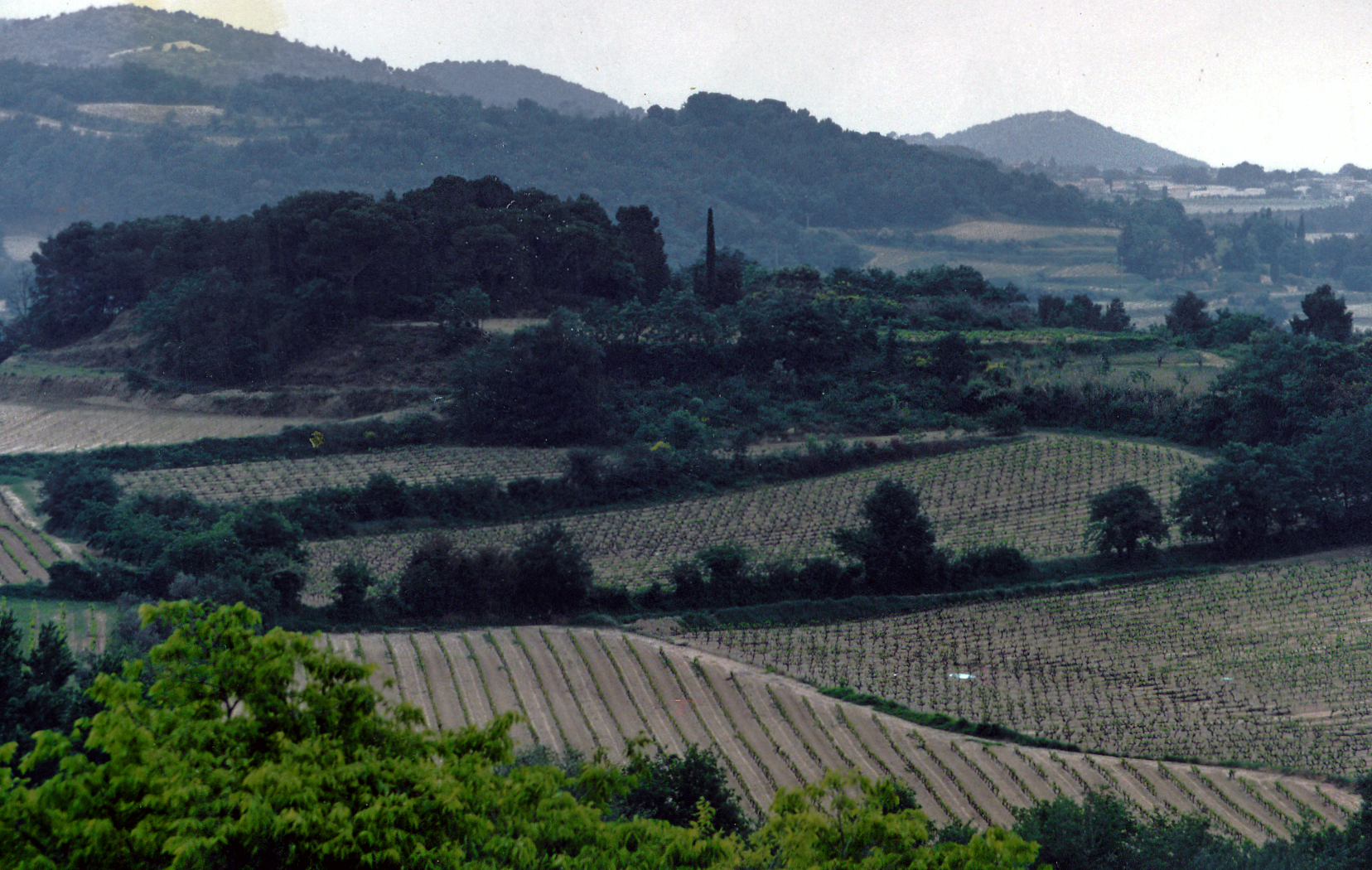
- Official name: Vacqueyras
- Type: Appellation d'origine contrôlée
- Year established: 1990
- Country: France
- Part of: Southern Rhone region
- Other regions in Southern Rhone region: Luberon, Ventoux, Provence
- Climate region: Mediterranean climate
- Soil conditions: alluvial soils, sandy-clay
- Size of planted vineyards: 1,421 hectares (3,510 acres) (2025)
- Grapes produced: Grenache (main), Syrah, Mourvedre, Cinsault, Muscardin, Counoise, Clairette, Bourboulenc
- Wine produced: 38,147 hectolitres (839,100 imp gal; 1,007,700 US gal) (2025)

Vacqueyras is a French wine Appellation d'Origine Contrôlée (AOC) in the southern Rhône wine region of France, along the banks of the River Ouvèze. At the foot of the vertical rock massif of the Dentelles de Montmirail, the vineyard extends across the villages of Vacqueyras and Sarrians in the Vaucluse department. One of the 17 crus of Côtes du Rhône wines, it is primarily a red wine region with some white and rosé wines being produced. The wine is similar to those of nearby Gigondas and Cairanne.

== History ==
Wine has been produced in the region since the 15th century. However records are sparse, reduced to mentioning large vineyards and a decree on how to keep hungry goats away from the grapes. Vacqueyras received the A.O.C. Côtes du Rhône Decree appellation in 1937, and in 1955 was promoted to Côtes du Rhône Villages status, becoming a named village in 1967. In 1990, Vacqueyras was granted its own AOC, the first in the region since Gigondas in 1971,

== Climate and geography ==
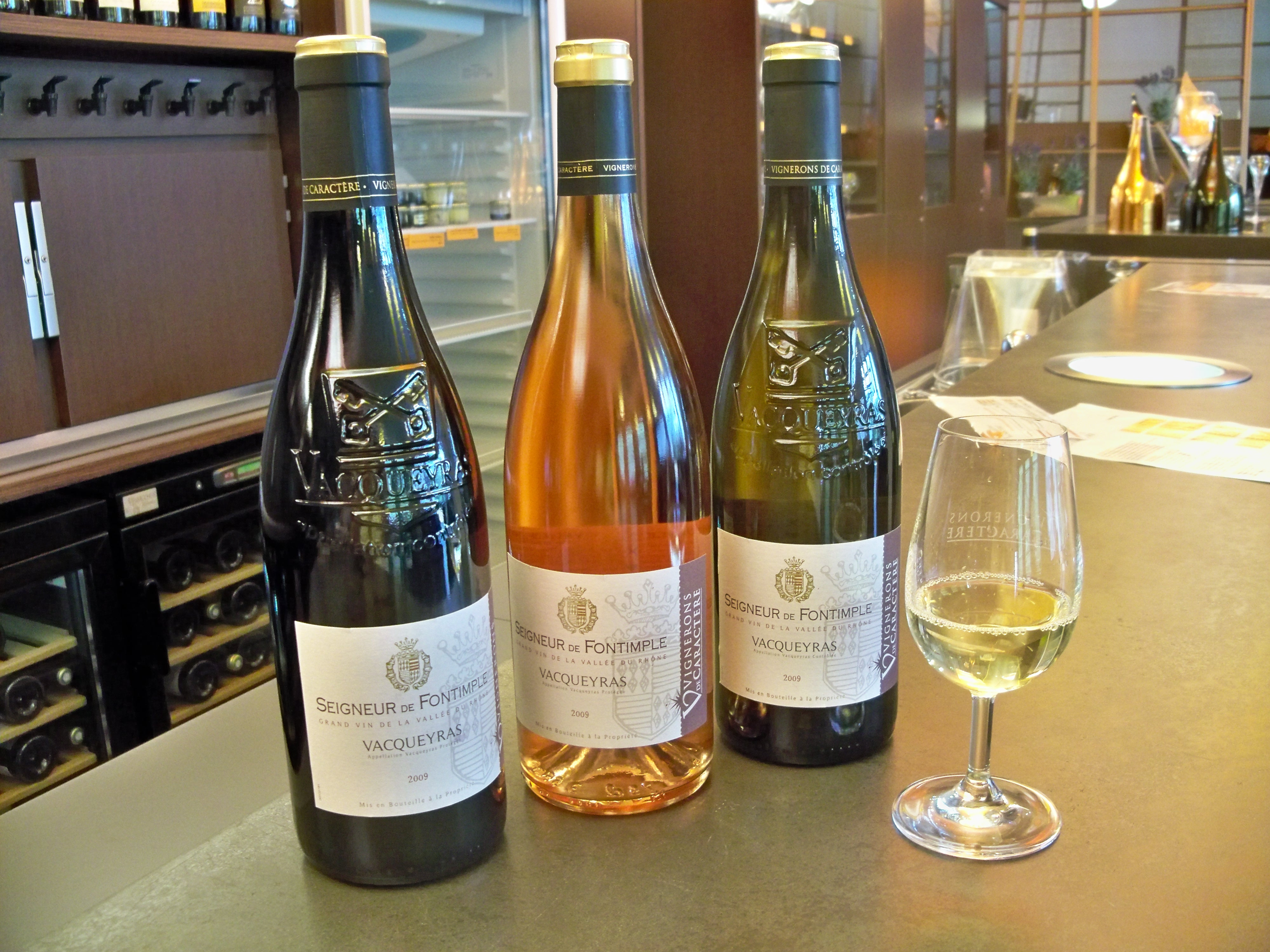
Vacqueyras AOC, red, rosé, and white

Located only a few kilometers south of Gigondas, Vacqueyras shares much of the same terroir with vineyards located in 100–400 metres (330–1,310 ft) altitude. The best vineyards are found on Plateau de Garrigues. In the lowland, warmer temperatures result in more powerful and often inelegant wines.

== Grapes and wine ==
The red wine can be much like the wines from Gigondas and at their best, the wines of Vacqueyras can match those of their northern sibling. Vacqueyras wines have been called "poor man's Châteauneuf-du-Pape". Vacqueyras is, like Gigondas, known for its power rather than its elegance. The main variety in the wine is Grenache, however, producers of Vacqueyras use more Syrah than is used in Gigondas which can make the style seem cooler.

The red wines are made principally from Grenache Noir, complemented by Mourvèdre Noir, Syrah Noir. Other permitted varieties include Bourboulenc Blanc, Brun Argenté Noir (locally known as Camarèse or Vaccarèse), Carignan Noir, Cinsaut Noir, Clairette Blanc, Clairette Rose Rosé, Counoise Noir, Grenache Blanc, Grenache Gris, Marsanne, Muscardin Noir, Piquepoul Noir, Roussanne, Terret Noir, and Viognier. The proportion of the main grape variety and complementary grape varieties combined is greater than or equal to 90%. The proportion of the Grenache grapes is greater than or equal to 50%. The proportion of the Mourvèdre and Syrah grape combined is greater than or equal to 20%.

Detailed map of the Rhône wine region, with separate maps of Southern Rhône ("Zoom A") and Northern Rhône ("Zoom B")

== See also ==
- French wine
