= Abraham Izak Perold =

South African chemist and viticulturist

- Born: October 20, 1880
- Died: December 11, 1941 (aged 61)
- Citizenship: South Africa
- Occupations: Chemist; Neurologist

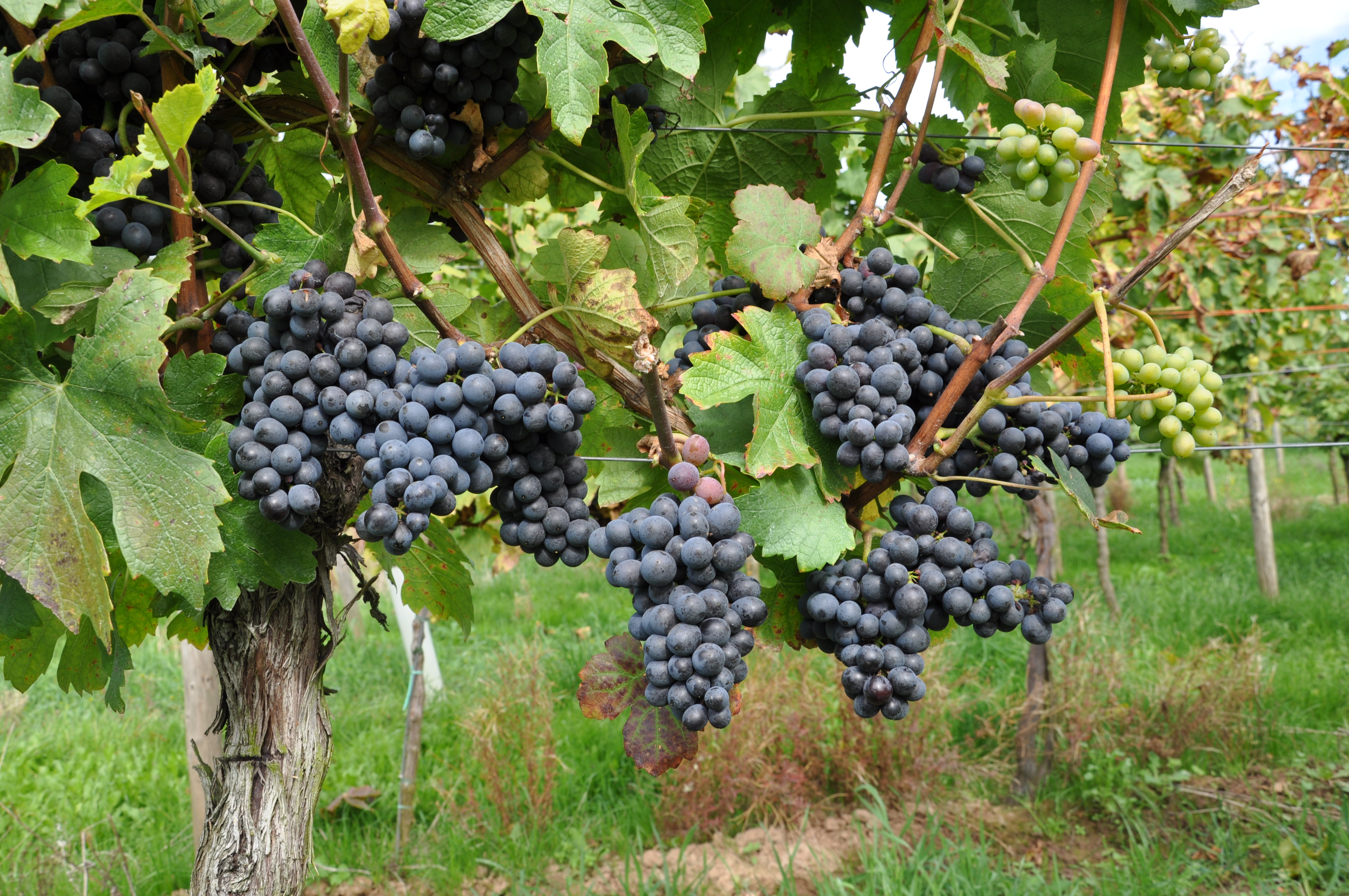
Pinotage grape, created by Perold

Abraham Izak Perold, Ph.D. (20 October 1880 – 11 December 1941) was a South African chemist and viticulturist. Educated in South Africa and Germany, Perold is best known for developing the Pinotage grape variety in 1925 through crossing Pinot noir and Cinsault. Dr. Perold also introduced 177 grape varieties into South Africa and became the first Professor of Viticulture at the University of Stellenbosch, later becoming Dean of the Faculty of Agriculture at the university.

== See also ==
- South African wine
- List of wine personalities
