= Oeillade noire =

Variety of grape

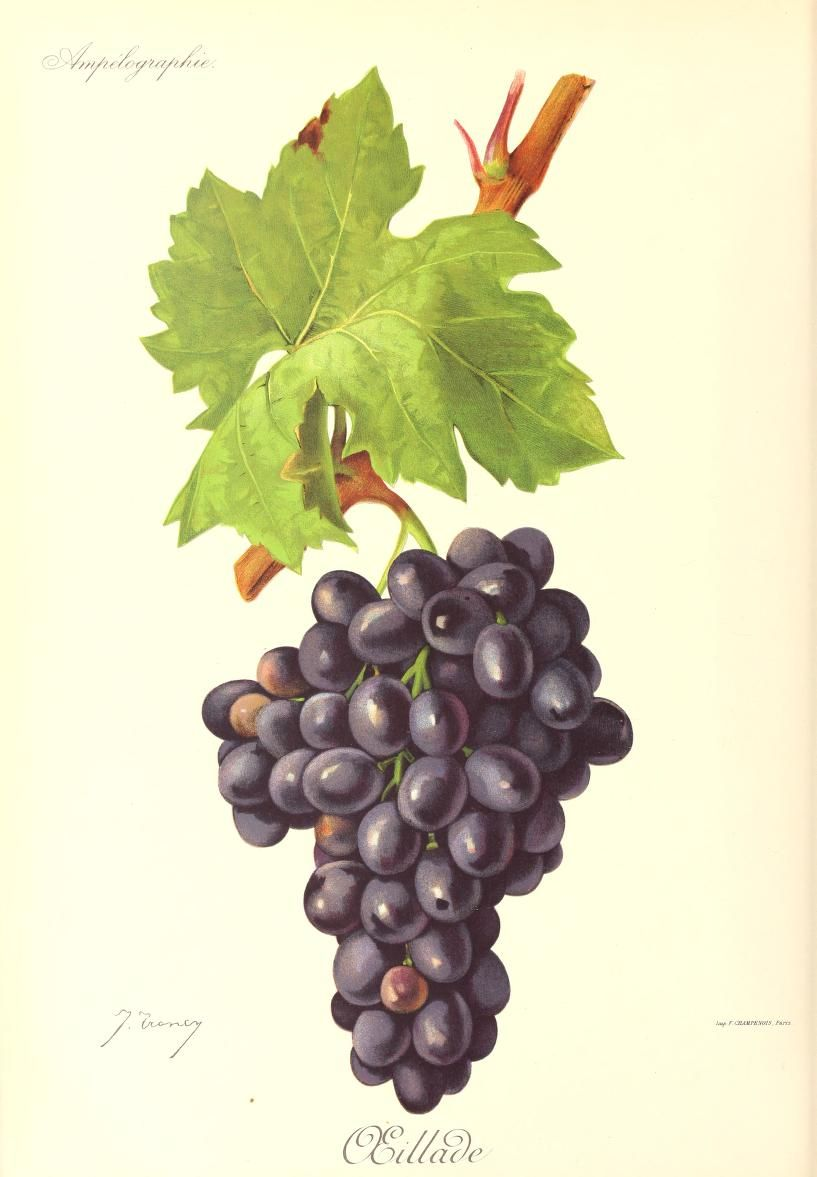
Variety of grape

Œillade noire (French pronunciation: [œjad nwaʁ]) is a red French wine grape variety that has been historically grown in the Languedoc and Provence wine region but it is now close to extinction. The grape is often confused for the Rhone wine grape Cinsault which is known under the synonym œillade noire when it is sold as a table grape. It was also once thought to be a color mutation of Picardan which is known as œillade blanche and share several similar synonyms to œillade noire. However the grape has no known relation to both Cinsault and Picardan.

== History ==
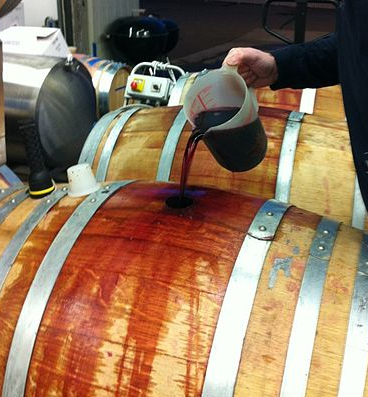
The name œillade could be derived from the French word ouiller that means "to top up" and may be a reference to the winemaking practice of using extra wines to "top up" barrels and other containers to prevent oxidation and spoilage.

The name œillade has two potential origins. The name could come from the French word ouiller that means "to top up" which can have a winemaking connotation of being a "topping wine" that is used to fill up wine barrels and other containers to remove ullage space that allows air to seep in and potential wine faults to develop. It could also be derived from the word œil which means eye and may be a viticultural reference to the fruiting bud of a grapevine.

The first mention of an œillade grape was in the lyrics of a "harvest song" sung by vineyard workers that was recorded in 1544 by the French author Bonaventure des Périers. The lyrics includes reference to "œillades, cépage de la vallée du Rhône" which has led many ampelographers to speculate that the lyrics are actually referring to the white Rhone grape Picardan (most notable for being one of the 13 varieties permitted in the Châteauneuf-du-Pape AOC) that was historically known as œillade blanche. The first undisputed mentioning of œillade noire was in a 1676 catalogue of black grape varieties compiled by the French botanist Pierre Magnol where œillade is listed along the black-skin grapes of the Terret and Piquepoul families.

== Viticulture ==
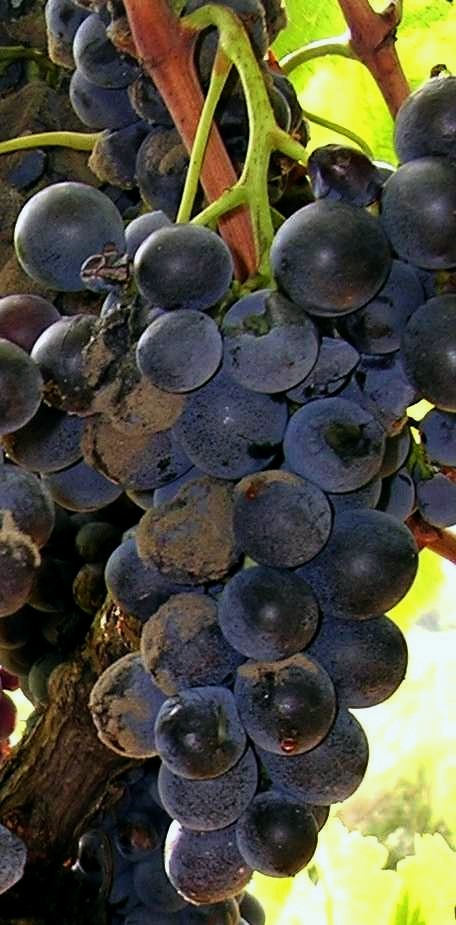
While infection of Botrytis cinerea can be welcomed in some white grape varieties, in red wine grapes such as œillade noire it contributes to the viticultural hazard of botrytis bunch rot (pictured).

Œillade noire is a mid-ripening grape variety that has a tendency to produce high yields of large berries and clusters. Growers working with the variety will often keep the vine in check with winter pruning and short cordons. In southern France it has been traditionally planted in higher elevation vineyards where varieties like Cinsault tend not to ripen well. The vine is susceptible to a number of viticultural hazards including coulure, millerandage, botrytis bunch rot and leafhoppers.

== Wine regions ==
Œillade noire has a long history of being grown throughout southern France including in the Gard, Hérault, Rhône, Vaucluse, Var departments covering mostly what is now the Languedoc and Provence wine regions. After the phylloxera epidemic of the late 19th and World Wars of the 20th century, plantings of œillade noire sharply diminished and the grape was on the verge of extinction. It is slowly being revived in the Languedoc region in Saint-Chinian and by at least one wine estate in the town of Béziers who is making a varietal style red and rosé of Oeillade noire. However the grape is currently not a permitted variety in any Appellation d'origine contrôlée (AOC) designated wines and can only be produced as a vin de table.

== Styles ==
According to Master of Wine Jancis Robinson, œillade noire tends to produce soft, fruity light bodied red wines of modest alcohol levels that are meant to be released soon after vintage and consumed young.

== Synonyms ==
Over the years Oeillade noire has been known under a variety of synonyms including: Aragnan noir (in the Vaucluse department), Aragnan sec, Araignan, Araignan noir, La Croque, Negra Gentile, Œillade, Œillade noir, Ouilade, Ouillade, Ouillard, Ouiliade, Passerille noire (in the Saint-Péray AOC), Puillade, Uliade and Ulliade.
