= Galets roulés =

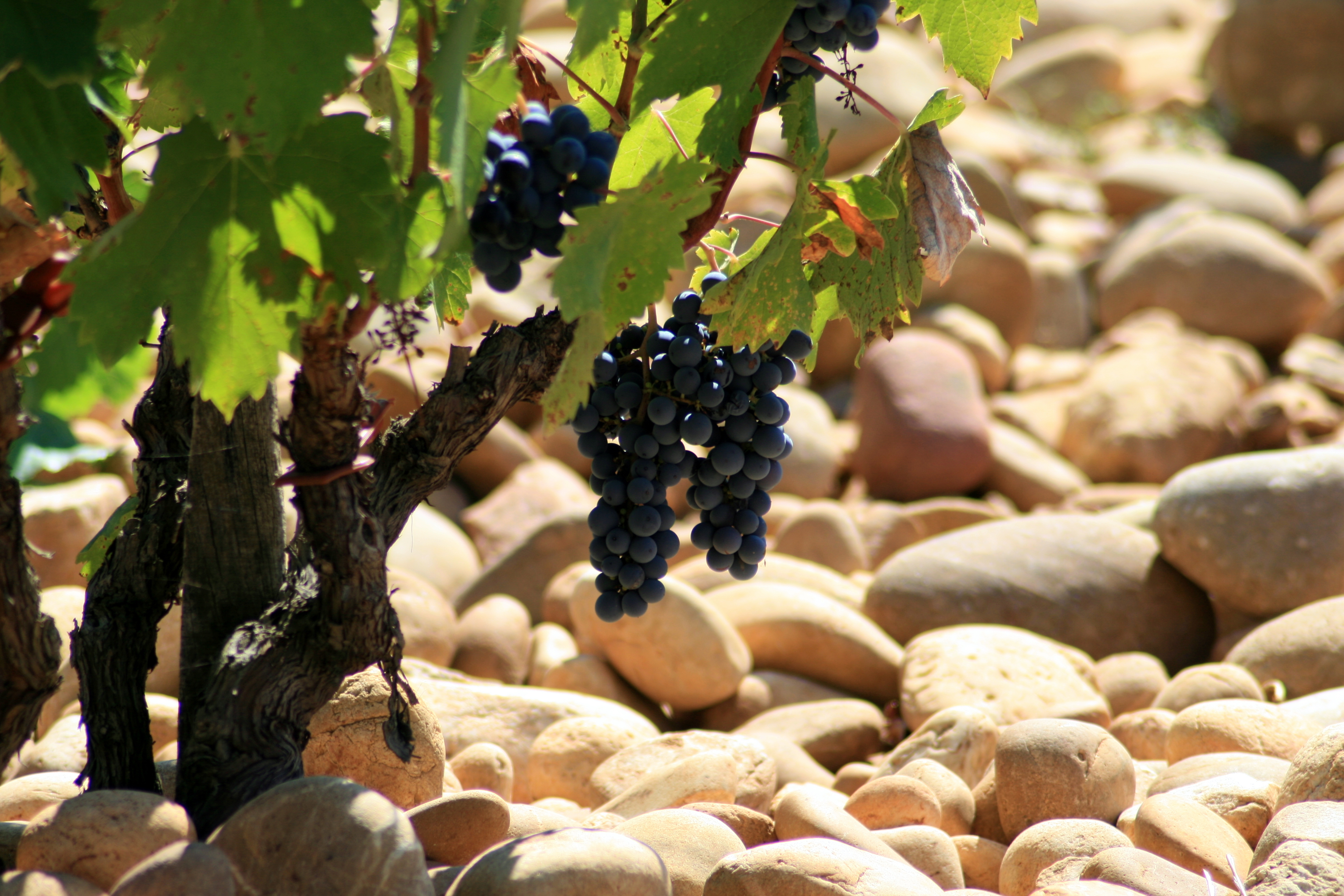
Galets roulés at Châtauneuf-du-Pape.

Galets roulés are components of the terrain, or terroir, and a distinguishing feature of many of the vineyards in the Côtes du Rhône AOC and more specifically Châteauneuf-du-Pape AOC and other top wine-producing areas in the regions such as Gigondas AOC and Vacqueyras AOC.

They are often larger, rounded stones that have been smoothed by both glacial and fluvial actions over time and deposited in the region by the Rhône.

Galets roulés (means rolled pebbles) are predominantly quartzite and are thought to be integral to the growth of vines and more importantly, the ripening of the fruit by absorbing the heat from the daytime sunshine and then releasing that heat slowly overnight due to their natural capacity for heat retention and transmission. This is well suited to the Grenache variety that is widely grown and is the base of much of the red wines produced in the region. Galets roulés also serve to protect the vine and minimize soil erosion during the periods of strong winds that are known in the area as mistral.
