= Pinotage =

Variety of grape

- Grape (Vitis)
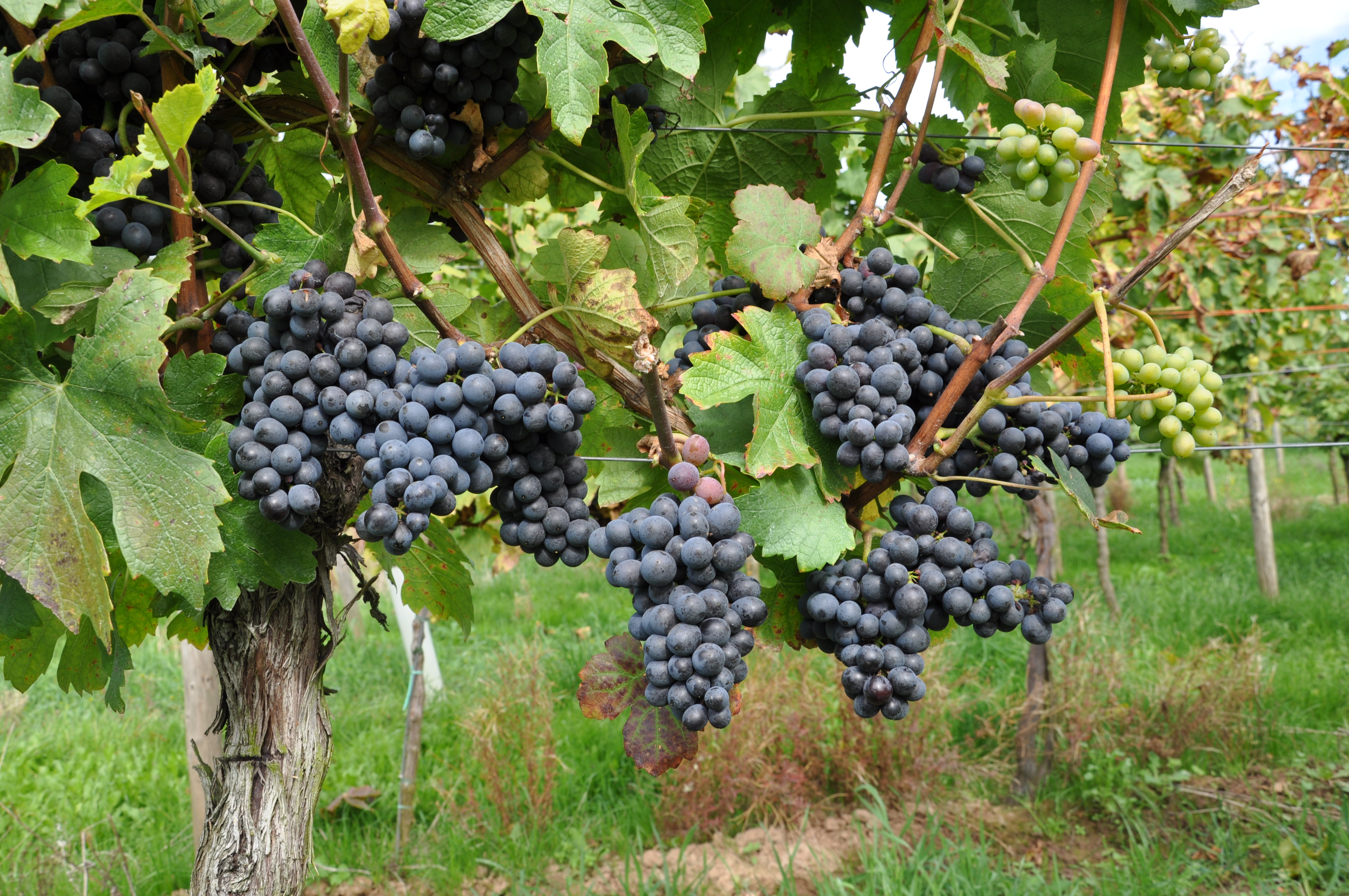
- Color of berry skin: Red
- Species: Vitis vinifera
- Also called: Perold's Hermitage x Pinot
- Origin: South Africa
- Notable regions: Stellenbosch-Simonsberg, South Africa
- VIVC number: 9286

Pinotage /ˈpɪnətɑːʒ/ PIN-ə-tahzh is a red wine grape that is South Africa's signature variety. It was cultivated there in 1925 as a cross between Pinot noir and Cinsaut (Cinsaut was known as "Hermitage" in South Africa at that time, hence the name). It typically produces deep red varietal wines with smoky, bramble and earthy flavours, sometimes with notes of bananas and tropical fruit. The grape is a viticultural intraspecific cross of two varieties of Vitis vinifera, not an interspecific hybrid.

== History ==
The Pinotage grape variety was created in South Africa in 1924 by Abraham Izak Perold, the first Professor of Viticulture at Stellenbosch University. Perold was attempting to combine the best qualities of the robust Hermitage with Pinot noir, which can be difficult to grow. Perold planted the four seeds from his cross in the garden of his official residence at Welgevallen Experimental Farm and then apparently forgot about them. In 1928 he left the university to take up a job with KWV co-operative and the garden became overgrown. During a clean-up at Welgevallen farm, a young academic named Dr. Charlie Neihaus managed to rescue the seedlings and replant them at Stellenbosch.

The young plants were moved to Elsenburg Agricultural College under Perold's successor, CJ Theron. In 1935 Theron grafted them onto newly established Richter 99 and Richter 57 rootstock at Welgevallen. Meanwhile, Perold continued to visit his former colleagues. Theron showed him the newly grafted vines, and the one that was doing best was selected for propagation and was christened Pinotage. The first wine was made in 1941 at Elsenburg, with the first commercial plantings at Myrtle Grove near Sir Lowry's Pass. Also in 1941 Pinotage vines were planted at the Kanonkop Estate by Paul Sauer and Danie Rossouw, the wines of which have later risen to great fame and can mature up to 25 years, so that this estate has even been called "a formidable leader of Cape's red wine pack."

The first recognition came when a Bellevue wine made from Pinotage became the champion wine (General Smuts Trophy Winner) at the Cape Wine Show of 1959, followed by Sauer & Rossouw in 1961 with their Pinotage from Kanonkop Wine Estate. The Bellevue wine would become the first to mention Pinotage on its label in 1961, when Stellenbosch Farmer's Winery (SFW) marketed it under their Lanzerac brand. This early success, and its easy viticulture, prompted a wave of planting during the 1960s.

== Criticism ==
Despite the reputation for easy cultivation, the Pinotage grape has not escaped criticism. A common complaint is the tendency to develop isoamyl acetate during winemaking which leads to a sweet pungency that often smells like paint. A group of British Masters of Wine visiting in 1976 were unimpressed by Pinotage, calling the nose "hot and horrible" and comparing the taste to "rusty nails". Throughout its history, the grape has seen its plantings rise and fall due to the current fashion of the South African wine industry. In the early 1990s, after the end of Apartheid, the world's wine market was opening to South Africa wine and winemakers ignored Pinotage in favour of more internationally recognised varieties like Syrah and Cabernet Sauvignon. Towards the end of the 20th century, the grape's fortunes began to turn, and by 1997 it commanded higher prices than any other South African grape.

Oz Clarke has suggested that part of some South African winemakers' disdain for Pinotage stems from the fact that it's a distinctly New World wine while the trend for South African wine is to reflect more European influences and flavours. Despite being a cross from a Burgundy and Rhône grape, Pinotage reflects none of the flavours of a French wine. While not a critique itself, outside of small plantings most notably in New Zealand and the United States, Pinotage has yet to develop a significant presence in any other wine region.

== Pinotage renaissance ==
Pinotage remained relatively obscure internationally until Beyers Truter from Kanonkop won the 1987 Diner's Club Wine of the year for his Pinotage. Pinotage has since experienced a renaissance in South Africa, with an increasing number of producers exploring a bright and juicy expression of the variety that shows off the fruit rather than oak, and showing real finesse with less ripe extraction.

From 2007 to 2017, the quality, demand, and supply of Pinotage grew significantly. From around 3 million litres of Pinotage a year at the turn of the century, domestic sales have increased to over 5 million litres, and exports since 2001 have gone from just over 8 million litres a year to close on 19 million litres – contributing an estimated R495 million to the local economy in 2017.

In two decades, winemakers and marketers embraced this grape cultivar, which led to the expansion of the market for Pinotage globally. Competitions like the Absa Top 10 Pinotage Awards, which started in 1997, and initiatives by organisations like the Pinotage Association have assisted in establishing this uniquely South African wine. Accolades like the 2017 Tim Atkin's South African Red Wine of the Year (awarded to Beeslaar Pinotage) confirms the trend of quality Pinotage wines. Pinotage weighed heavily in favour of Kanonkop cellarmaster Abrie Beeslaar being named the 2017 Winemaker of the Year at the prestigious International Wine and Spirit Competition in London, making him the second Kanonkop winemaker to achieve the honour after Beyers Truter in 1991.

Of the 10 most-planted wine grape varieties in South Africa, Pinotage is the only red cultivar to have grown in hectares from 2007 to 2017. In 2017, the SA Wine Industry Information & Systems (SAWIS) industry body indicated that the total area under Pinotage vines was 6 979 ha, up from 6.5% to 7.4% of the total area under vines. Admittedly, even more than 40 years after completely dismissing the grape, many in the United Kingdom's wine trade (one of South Africa's main export markets) still malign the grape as a whole, but slowly perceptions are changing especially with younger members of the trade becoming strong defenders of the grape.

== Wine regions ==
In addition to South Africa, Pinotage is also grown in Brazil, Canada, Germany, Israel, New Zealand, Switzerland, the United States and Zimbabwe. In New Zealand, there are 94 acres (38 ha) of Pinotage. In the United States, there are plantings in Arizona, California, Michigan, Oregon and Virginia. German winemakers have recently begun experimenting with the grape.

=== South Africa ===
The majority of the world's plantings of Pinotage is found in South Africa, where it makes up just 6% of the vineyard area but is considered a symbol of the country's distinctive winemaking traditions. It is a required component (30-70%) in "Cape blends". Here it is made into the full range of styles, from easy-drinking quaffing wine and rosé to barrel-aged wine intended for cellaring. It is also made into a fortified 'Port wine' style, and even a red sparkling wine. A white Pinotage wine is now being produced by a small number of winemakers in South Africa, an example being from Oude Compagnies Post in the Tulbagh valley. The latest and fastest growing trend is the production of coffee styled Pinotage. The grape is very dependent on the skill and style of winemaking, with well made examples having the potential to produce deep colored, fruity wines that can be accessible early as well as age.

== Viticulture and winemaking ==
The vines are vigorous like their parent Cinsaut and easy to grow, ripening early with high sugar levels. Pinotage can be grown via the trellised system or as bushvines (untrellised). The older Pinotage vineyards are predominantly planted as bushvines and it is perceived that these lend to more concentration of fruit and depth to the wine. It has the potential to produce yields of 120 hl/ha (6.8 tons/acre) but older vines tend to lower their yields to as low as 50 hl/ha. Yield restriction is managed through water stress and bunch thinning. In winemaking, controlling the coarseness of the grape and the isoamyl acetate character are two important considerations. Volatile acidity is another potential wine fault that can cause Pinotage to taste like raspberry vinegar. Since the 1990s, more winemakers have used long and cool fermentation periods to minimise the volatile esters as well as exposure to French and American oak.

The grape is naturally high in tannins which can be tamed with limited maceration time but reducing the skin contact can also reduce some of the mulberry, blackberry and damson fruit character that Pinotage can produce. Some winemakers have experimented with letting the grapes get very ripe prior to harvest followed by limited oak exposures as another means of taming the more negative characteristics of the grape while maintaining its fruitiness. Newer clones have shown some potential as well. In recent years South African winemakers have experimented with producing Pinotage in a lighter style, picking grapes earlier for lower sugar and using whole bunches in fermentation to increase the acidity, a style more similar to the parent grape Pinot Noir.

== Synonyms ==
Perold's Hermitage x Pinot. The alternative name 'Herminoir' was considered.
