= Aubun =

Variety of grape

- Grape (Vitis)
- Color of berry skin: Noir
- Species: Vitis vinifera
- Also called: Counoise
- Origin: France
- Notable regions: Rhône valley
- VIVC number: 761

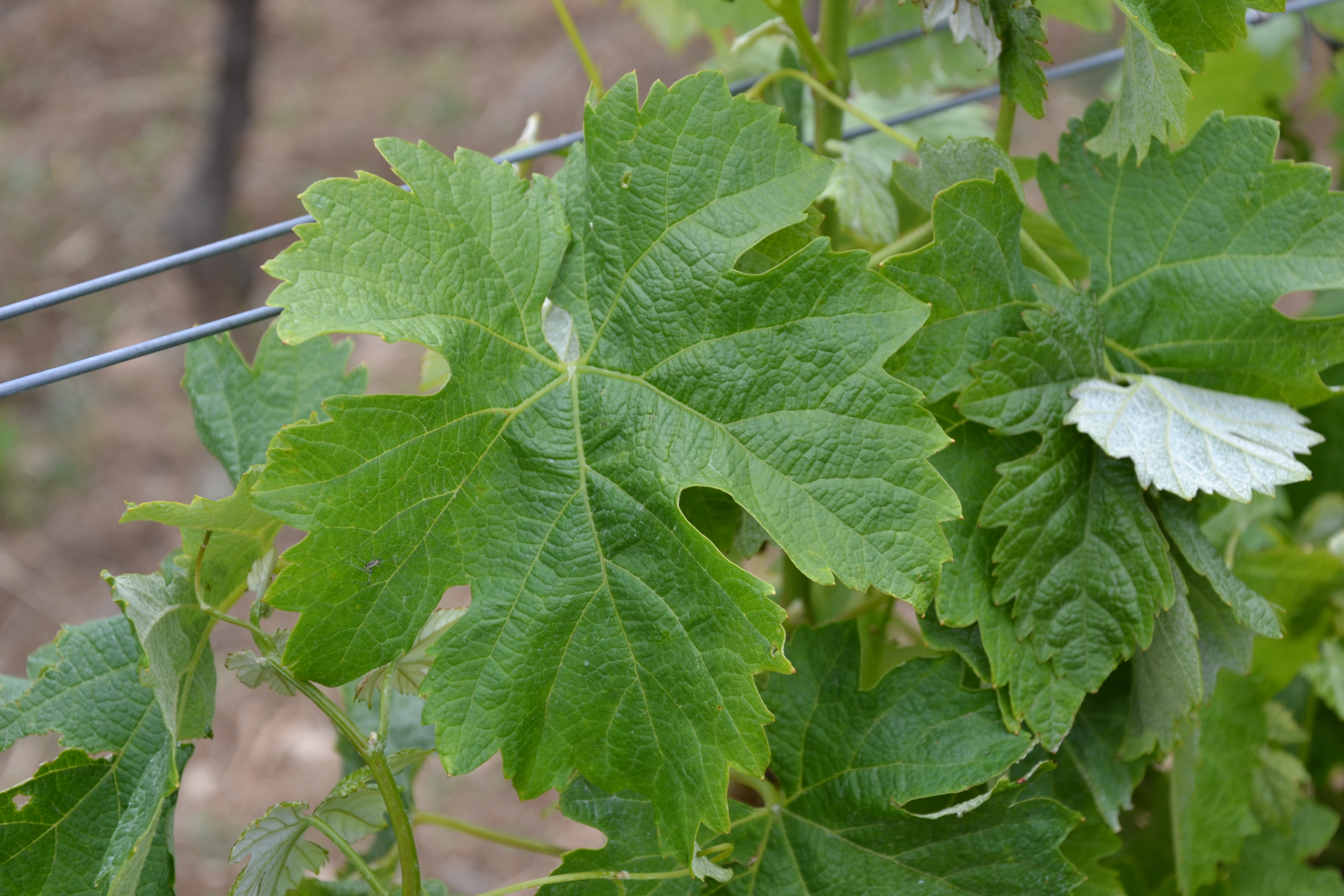
Aubun leaf

Aubun is a red wine grape grown primarily in the Rhône valley. The grape has similar characteristics to Carignan grapes in that it tends to produce high yields and produces wines that are fat with slight bitter finishes. Early during the phylloxera epidemic of the 19th century, the Aubun vines showed some resistance to the pest as well as to downy and powdery mildew. The vines tends to bud late and not be affected by spring frost. In 2000, there were 1,400 hectares (3,500 acres) of Aubun in France.

== Aubun and Counoise ==
Aubun is easily confused with Counoise, because of a large similarity in the vineyard. Aubun and Counoise were also grown mixed in a field blend in some older vineyards. Therefore, Counoise is found as a synonym for Aubun, but the "real" Counoise is considered to be a grape of higher quality, which is one of the grape varieties allowed in the blend of Châteauneuf-du-Pape wines.

== Synonyms ==
Synonyms for Aubun include Carignan de Bedoin, Carignan de Bedouin, Carignan de Gigondas, Counoise, Guyene, Morescola, Motardie, Moustardier, Moustardier Noir, Moutardier, Quenoise.

Aubun is not related to the similarly named Aubin blanc from Lorraine in east France.
