= Château Rayas =

French vineyard

Coordinates: 44.0742°N 4.847°E

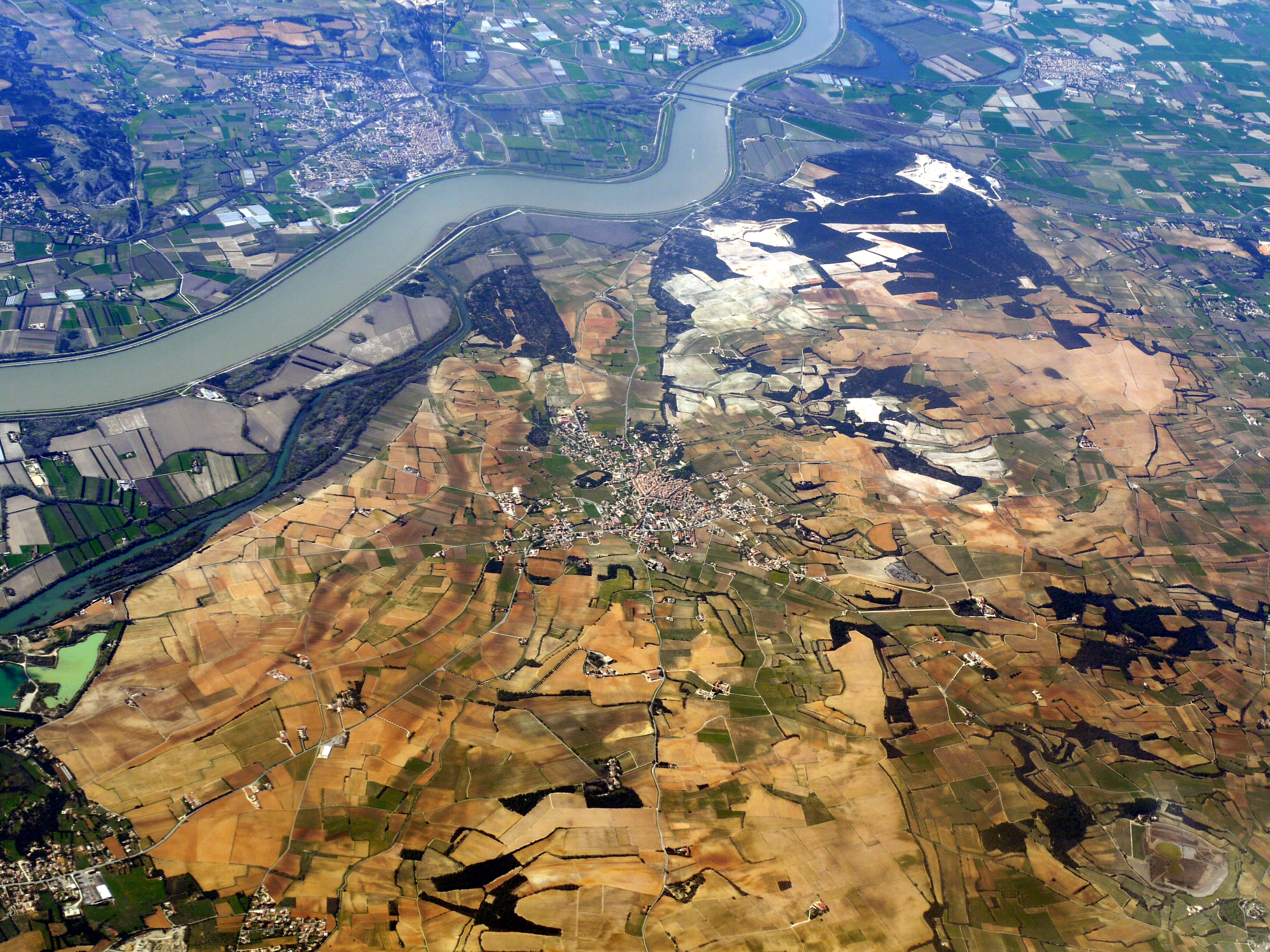
Aerial view of Châteauneuf-du-Pape

Château Rayas is a vineyard in the Châteauneuf-du-Pape AOC.

== History ==
The Reynaud family began working at the property in 1880. Jacques Reynaud died in 1997, and was succeeded by his nephew, Emmanuel Reynaud. Emmanuel Reynaud died in 2025, Château Rayas is still continued by the family.

== Terroir ==
Its 13 hectares of vines are north-facing, and do not contain the galets roulés common in other Châteauneuf-du-Pape vineyards.

== Viticulture ==
The estate did not have electricity until the late 1980s. Several viticulture practices at Château Rayas differ from other producers in Châteauneuf. Only Grenache grapes are grown; wine yields at around 15hl/h are very low; the wines are matured in the uncommon 450 litre double-piéce oak casks. Grenache is vinified into red wine, and Grenache Blanc and Clairette blanche are made into white wine. Wine writer Jay McInerney named it as "one of the most profound expressions of the Grenache grape in the world." The estate bottles a second wine, Pignan.

== Wine criticism ==
The 1978 and 1990 vintages were rated 100 points by Robert M. Parker, Jr.
