= Bourboulenc =

Variety of grape

- Grape (Vitis)
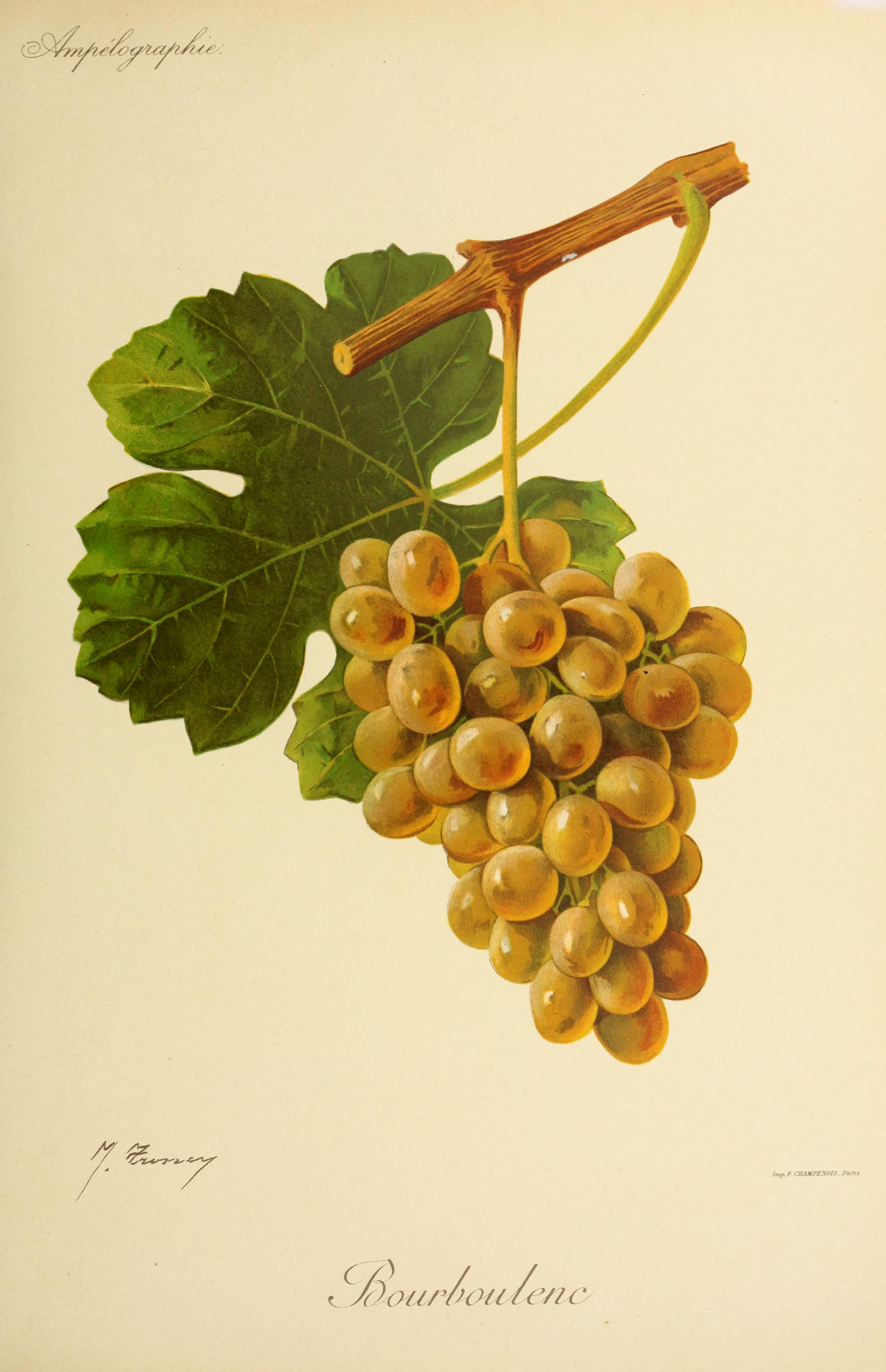
- Bourboulenc in Viala & Vermorel
- Color of berry skin: Blanc
- Species: Vitis vinifera
- Also called: See list of synonyms
- Origin: France
- Notable regions: Southern Rhône, Provence, Languedoc
- VIVC number: 1612

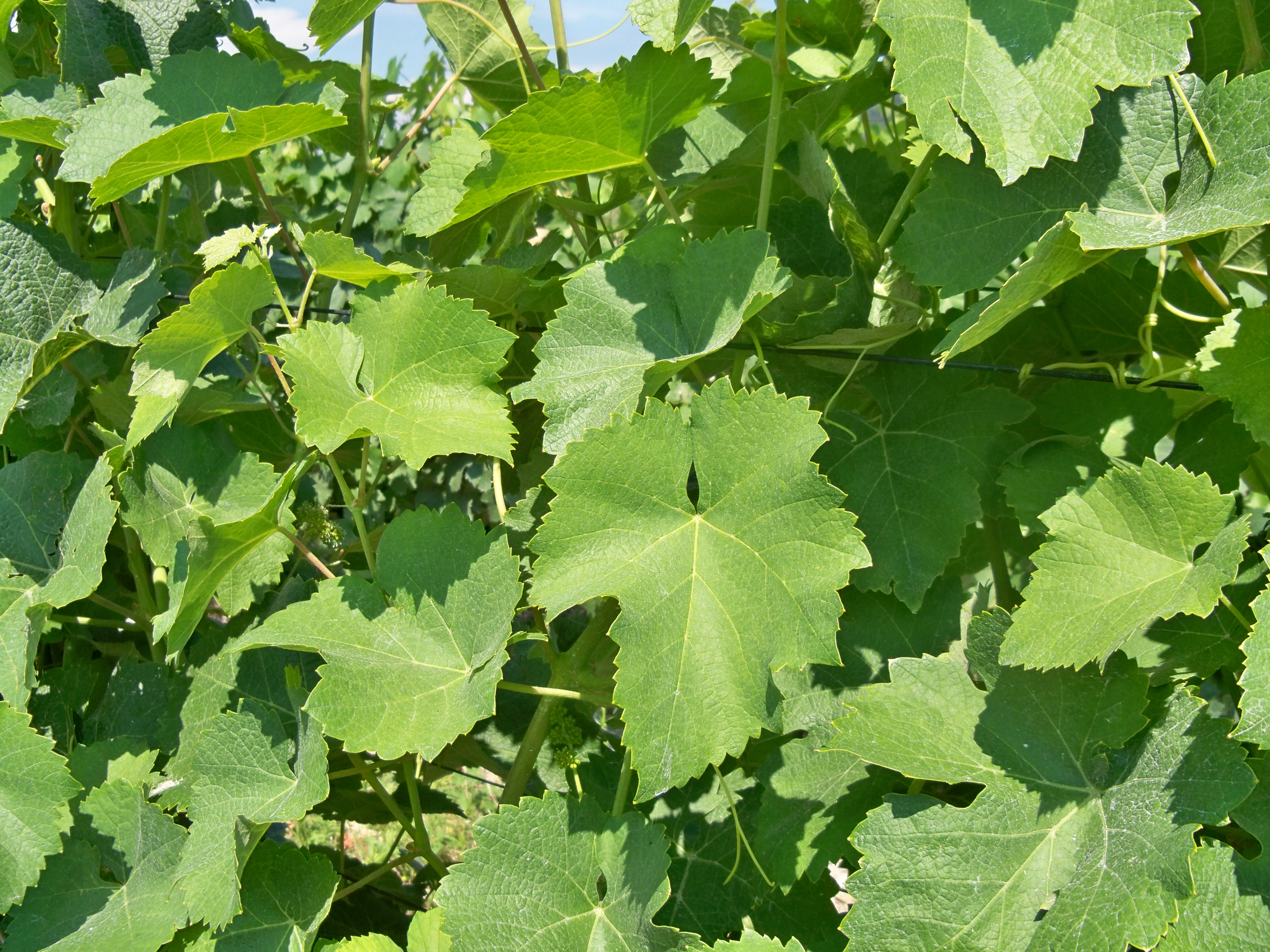
Leaves of Bourboulenc vines

Bourboulenc is a white wine grape variety primarily grown in southern France. The variety is found in the regions Southern Rhône, Provence and Languedoc.

Bourboulenc is a late-ripening grape variety with tight bunches of large grapes, that can be prone to rot in some years. Bourboulenc wine has a good acidity level, body, penetrating character, citrus aromas and a hint of smoke. However, if the grapes are picked too soon, the wines have a thin, neutral taste.

In 2000, there were 800 hectares (2,000 acres) of Bourboulenc in France.

== Wines ==
Varietal Bourboulenc is rare, but is allowed into a number of white wine appellations of southern France. Only in white La Clape, a geographical designation that may be used in conjunction with the Appellation d'Origine Contrôlée (AOC) Coteaux du Languedoc, is Bourboulenc the dominant grape variety. White La Clape must contain a minimum of 40% Bourboulenc.

=== Appellations where Bourboulenc may be included ===
French AOCs that may include the variety are:

- Bandol AOC
- Cassis AOC
- Châteauneuf-du-Pape AOC, where Bourboulenc was grown on 1% of the vineyard surface in 2004.
- Coteaux d'Aix-en-Provence AOC
- Côtes du Luberon AOC
- Côtes du Rhône AOC
- Côtes du Rhône-Villages AOC
- Côtes du Ventoux AOC
- Lirac AOC
- Tavel AOC
- Vacqueyras AOC

== History ==
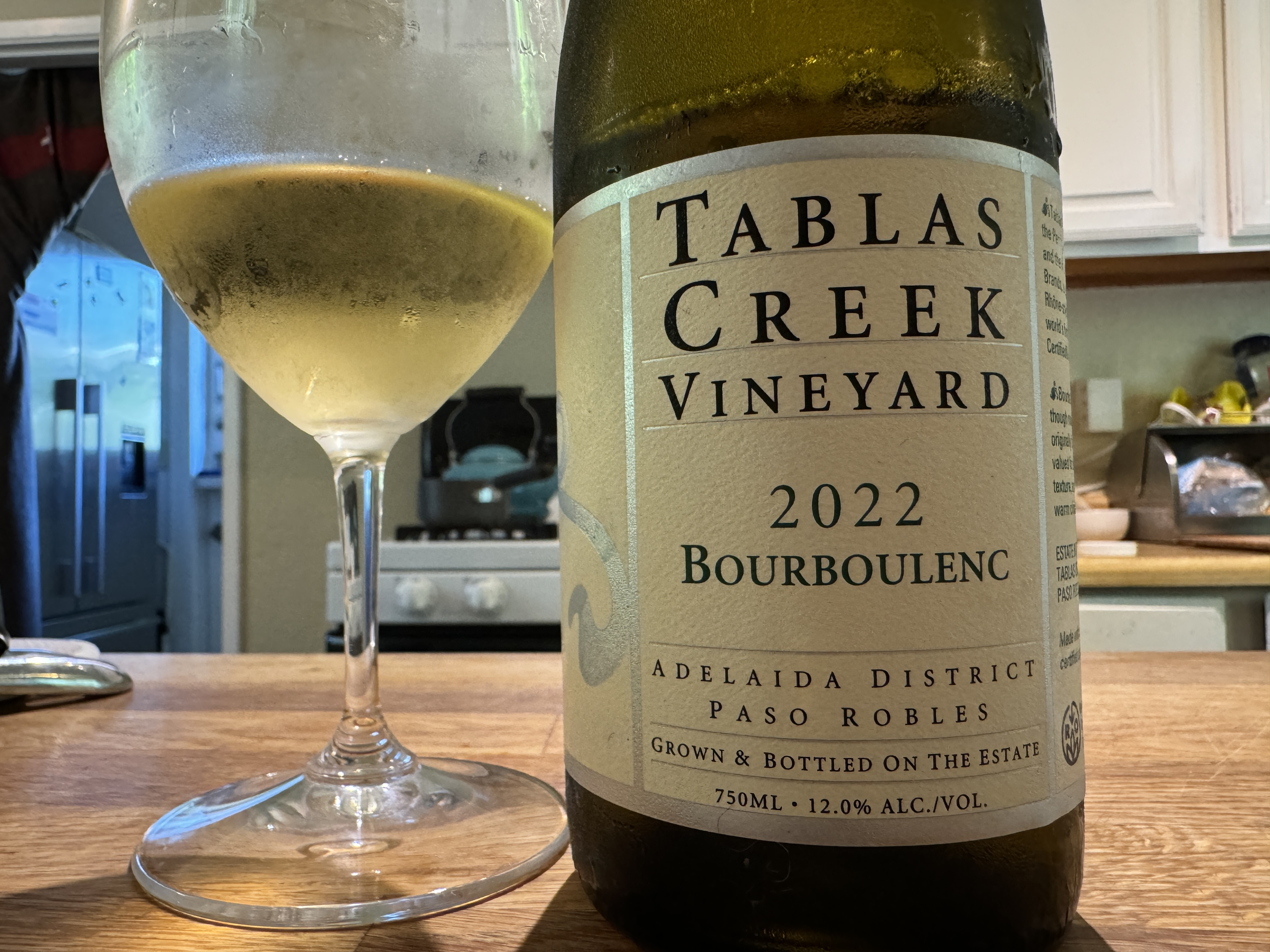
Tablas Creek Vineyard 2022 Bourboulenc

Bourboulenc has been grown in southern France for centuries, and has been proposed to be of Greek origin. The French vineyard area grown with Bourboulenc dropped by about half in the 1970s and doubled again in the 1980s, and Bourboulenc has primarily increased in popularity in Languedoc.

== Synonyms ==
Synonyms for Bourboulenc include Berlou blanc, Blanquette, Blanquette du Frontonnais, Blanquette du Gard, Blanquette menue, Bourbojlanc, Bourboulenco, Bourbouleng, Bourboulenque, Bourbounenco, Burbulen, Clairette dorée à Paulhan, Clairette à grains ronds, Clairette blanche, Clairette dorée, Clairette grosse, Clairette rousse, Clairette rousse du Var, Doucillon, Frappad, Grosse Clairette, Malvoisie, Malvoisie à la Clape, Mourterille, Ondenc, Picardan, Roussaou, Roussette, Roussette du Vaucluse. Note that these synonyms overlap with the proper names and synonyms of several other varieties of Rhône and nearby regions, such as Altesse, Clairette Blanche and Picardan.
