= Châteauneuf-du-Pape AOC =

French wine appellation

- Wine region
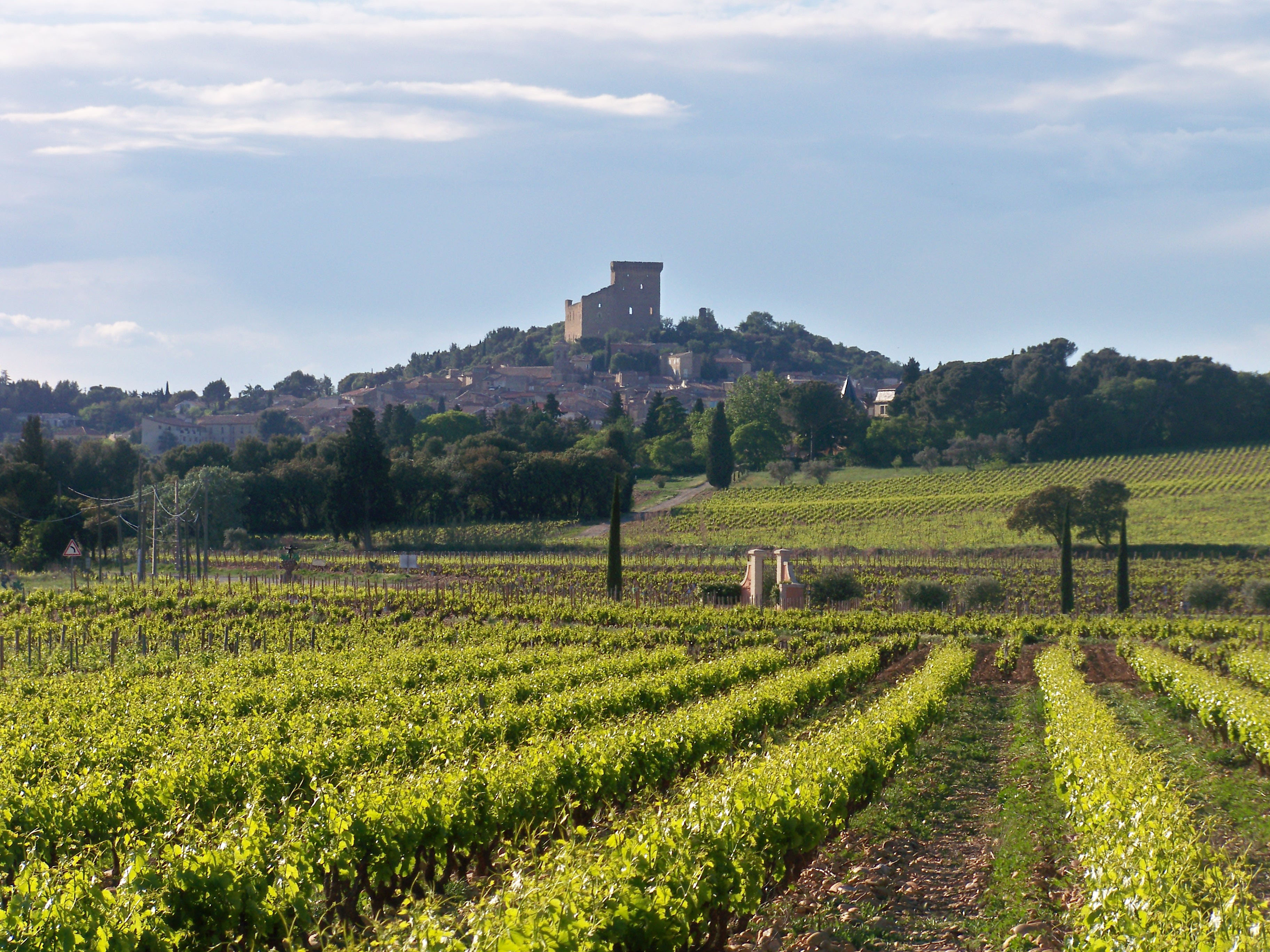
- Type: Appellation d'origine contrôlée
- Year established: 1936
- Country: France
- Part of: Southern Rhone
- Other regions in Southern Rhone: Tavel AOC, Gigondas AOC, Vacqueyras AOC, Lirac AOC
- Sub-regions: Châteauneuf-du-Pape, Orange, Courthezon, Bedarrides, Sorgues
- Climate region: Mediterranean climate
- Size of planted vineyards: 3200 hectares
- No. of vineyards: 320
- Grapes produced: Grenache, Syrah, Mourvedre, Bourboulenc, Cinsaut, Clairette blanche, Clairette rose, Counoise, Grenache blanc, Grenache gris, Muscardin, Picardan, Piquepoul blanc, Piquepoul gris, Piquepoul noir, Roussanne, Terret noir, Vaccarèse.
- No. of wineries: 180
- Wine produced: 100,000–105,000 hl

Châteauneuf-du-Pape (French pronunciation: [ʃɑtonœf dy pap]) is a French wine, an Appellation d'origine contrôlée (AOC) located around the village of Châteauneuf-du-Pape in the Rhône wine region in southeastern France. It is one of the most renowned appellations of the southern part of the Rhône Valley, and its vineyards are located around Châteauneuf-du-Pape and in neighboring villages, Bédarrides, Courthézon and Sorgues, between Avignon and Orange. They cover slightly more than 3,200 hectares or 7,900 acres (32 km^{2}) and produce over 110,000 hectolitres of wine a year, with more wine made in this one area of the southern Rhône than in all of the northern Rhône.

Châteauneuf-du-Pape is today often considered a part of the geographical region of Provence, even if historically it was part of the Comtat Venaissin. It, and other southern Rhône wines are however usually considered distinct from other wines in Provence by most experts.

== History ==
The wine region of Châteauneuf-du-Pape is located within the Vaucluse department in southeastern France.

Châteauneuf-du-Pape literally translates to "The Pope's new castle" and, indeed, the history of this appellation is firmly entwined with papal history. In 1309, Pope Clement V, former Archbishop of Bordeaux, relocated the papacy to the town of Avignon. Clement V and subsequent "Avignon Popes" were said to be great lovers of Burgundy wines and did much to promote them during the 70-year Avignon Papacy.

At the time, wine-growing around the town of Avignon was anything but illustrious. While the Avignon Papacy did much to advance the reputation of Burgundy wines, they also promoted viticulture of the surrounding area, more specifically the area 5–10 km (3–6 mi) north of Avignon close to the banks of the Rhône. Prior to the Avignon Papacy, viticulture of that area had been initiated and maintained by the Bishops of Avignon but largely for local consumption.

John XXII, who succeeded Clement V, in addition to Burgundy wine, regularly drank wine from the vineyards to the north and did much to improve viticultural practices there. Under John XXII, the wines of this area came to be known as "Vin du Pape", this term later becoming "Châteauneuf-du-Pape". John XXII also built the castle which is the symbol of the appellation.

In the 18th century, the wines were shipped under the name vin d'Avignon.

Records from the early 19th century mention wines of the name Châteauneuf-du-Pape-Calcernier which seems to have been a lighter-style wine than the Châteauneuf-du-Pape of today. They seem to have increased in reputation within France until phylloxera hit in the early 1870's which was earlier than most other French wine regions were affected. Prior to World War I, the bulk of Châteauneuf-du-Pape was sold to Burgundy as vin de médecine to be added to Burgundy wine to boost the strength and alcohol levels.

=== Early AOC regulations ===
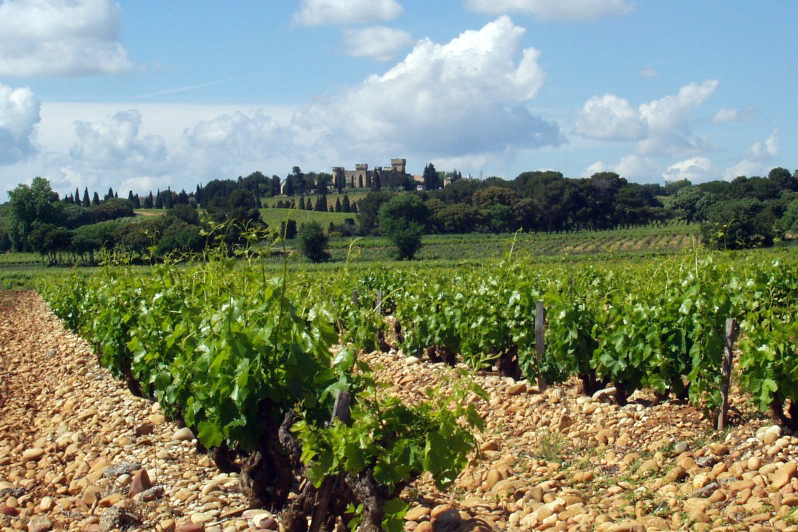
Vineyard with the Châteauneuf-du-Pape appellation borders, with vines trimmed as bushvines.

In the early 20th century, Châteauneuf-du-Pape was plagued by wine fraud; various rules for the production of Châteauneuf-du-Pape, drawn up and promulgated in 1923, were the first appellation contrôlée rules in France and provided the prototype for subsequent AOC rules.

These rules were enshrined in national law on 15 May 1936, when six AOCs were created: Arbois, Cassis, Châteauneuf-du-Pape, Monbazillac and Tavel for wine, and Armagnac for eau-de-vie.

The original AOC rules allowed ten varieties, were amended to thirteen in 1936 and eighteen in 2009. Baron Pierre le Roy of Château Fortia was the principal architect of these regulations which set the minimum alcohol level of the wines and set limits on yields as well as which types of grapes could be grown in which areas.

Another of the baron's requirements was that no vineyards were to be planted on land that was not arid enough to support plantings of both lavender and thyme.

In 1954, there was a media sensation as local stories claimed that "flying cigars", or UFOs similar to flying saucers, had been spotted above Châteauneuf-du-Pape and that aliens were interested in their wine. Local politicians, said to be sensing an opportunity to promote the region's wines, passed a law banning flying cigars from entering their airspace or landing on their territory, a law which remains in effect to this day. The legend has become lore among wine aficionados, and the wine Cigare Volant (French for "flying cigar"), in production since 1984, is named after the tale.

== Climate and geography ==
The appellation stretches from the eastern bank of the Rhône near Orange in the north-west to Sorgues near Avignon in the south-east. The altitude reaches 120 meters at its highest, in the northern part of the appellation. It covers 3200 hectares of land with at least three distinct types of soil or terroirs. In the north and north-east the famous galets roulés, round rocks or pebbles, cover the clay soil. The rocks are famous for retaining the heat from the plentiful sun, some 2800 hours a year, releasing it at night, ripening the grapes faster than in the eastern part of the appellation, where the soil is mostly sand, or the south, where the soil is more gritty. The powerful mistral wind carries away the moisture, intensifying the dry climate.

=== Terroir ===
The characteristic terroir of Châteauneuf-du-Pape comes from a layer of stones called Galets roulés ("pebbles"). The rocks are typically quartzite and remnants of Alpine glaciers that have been smoothed over millennia by the Rhône. The stone retains heat during the day and releases it at night which can have an effect of hastening the ripening of grapes. The stones can also serve as a protective layer to help retain moisture in the soil during the dry summer months. Some of the most prestigious vineyards in the area, like Château Rayas, have more traditional looking vineyards without the galets. These are most often vineyards located on south-facing slopes where the night-time radiated heat from the stones would be detrimental to the vines and cause overripening of the grapes.

=== La Crau ===
La Crau is one of Châteauneuf-du-Pape's most famous lieux-dits vineyards. The vineyard is owned primarily by Domaine du Vieux Télégraphe, one of the most classic Châteauneufs, but also producer Henri Bonneau maintains a firm position here. The vineyard is very rich in the aforementioned galets roulés, while Domaine du Vieux Lazaret with its over 100 hectares owned by Vignobles Jérôme Quiot is the largest.

== Wine ==
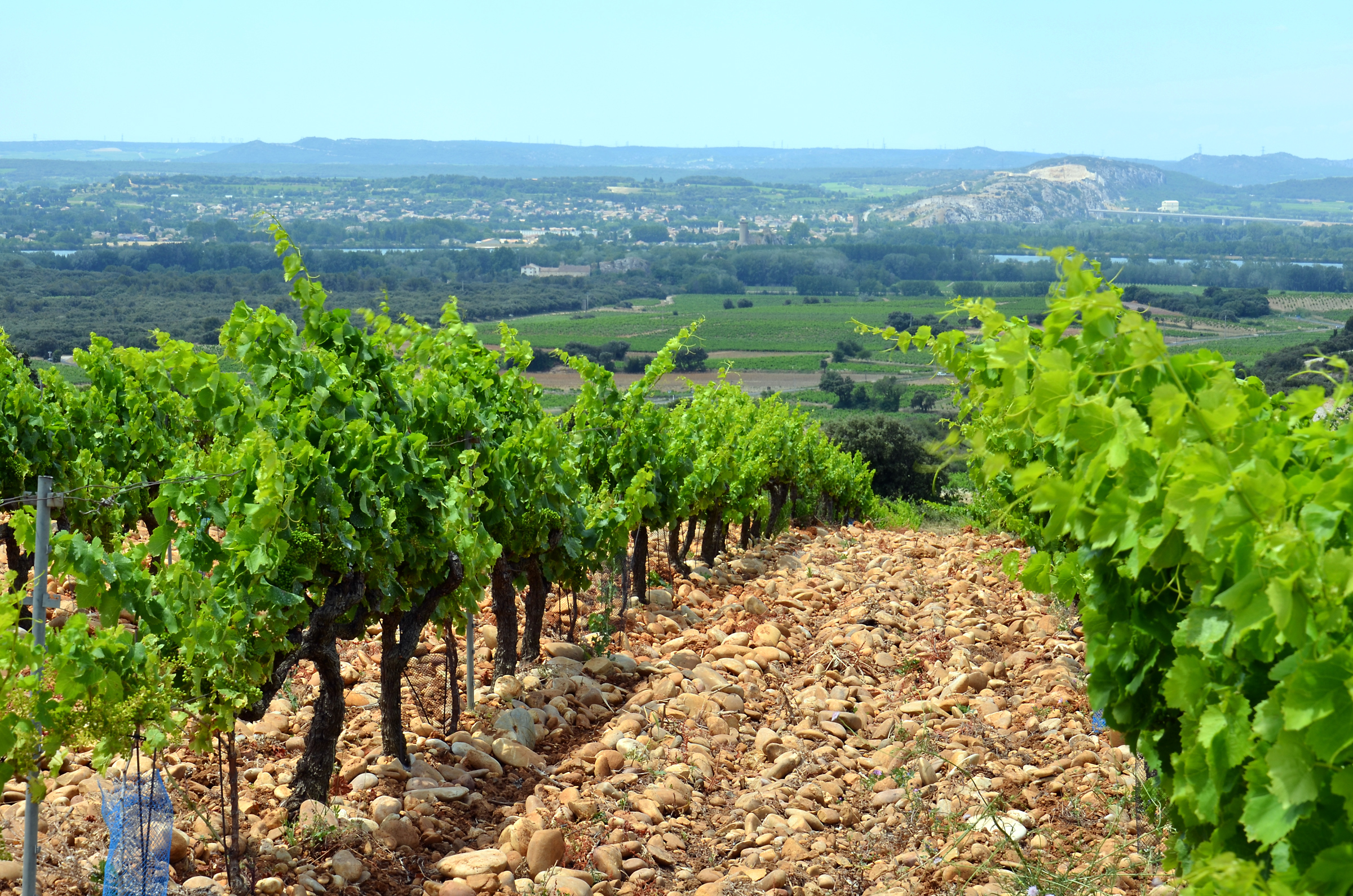
Vines of Châteauneuf-du-Pape growing in vineyards filled with galets, trimmed to a bushwine shape

Châteauneuf-du-Pape can be either red or white wine, but the large majority of the wines produced are red. The appellation rules did not until recently allow production of rosé.

The wines have traditionally been packaged in distinctive heavy dark wine bottles embossed with papal regalia and insignia. However, in recent times a number of producers have dropped the full papal seal in favour of a more generic icon, while still retaining the same heavy glassware.

=== Grape varieties ===
Châteauneuf-du-Pape traditionally has had thirteen grape varieties, but the 2009 version of the AOC rules changed that list to eighteen varieties, since blanc (white), rose (pink) and noir (black) versions of some grapes are now explicitly listed as separate varieties. Also in the previous version of the appellation rules, Grenache and Picpoul were associated with different pruning regulations in their noir and blanc versions, bringing the number of varieties previously mentioned from thirteen to fifteen.

Red varieties allowed are Cinsault, Counoise, Grenache noir, Mourvèdre, Muscardin, Piquepoul noir, Syrah, Terret noir, and Vaccarèse (Brun Argenté). White and pink varieties are Bourboulenc, Clairette blanche, Clairette rose, Grenache blanc, Grenache gris, Picardan, Piquepoul blanc, Piquepoul gris, and Roussanne. (The varieties not specifically mentioned before 2009 are Clairette rose, Grenache gris and Piquepoul gris.)

Both red and white varieties are allowed in both red and white Châteauneuf-du-Pape. There are no restrictions as to the proportion of grape varieties to be used, and unlike the case with other appellations, the allowed grape varieties are not differentiated into principal varieties and accessory varieties. Thus, it is theoretically possible to produce varietal Châteauneuf-du-Pape from any of the eighteen allowed varieties. In reality, most Châteauneuf-du-Pape wines are blends dominated by Grenache. Only one of every 16 bottles produced in the region contains white wine.

With 72% of the total vineyard surface in 2004, Grenache noir is very dominant, followed by Syrah at 10.5% and Mourvèdre at 7%, both of which have expanded in recent decades. Cinsaut, Clairette, Grenache blanc, Roussanne and Bourboulenc each cover 1-2.5%, and the remaining seven varieties each account for 0.5% or less.

It is common to grow the vines as gobelets and this is the only vine training system allowed for the first four red varieties. Yields are restricted to two tons per acre.

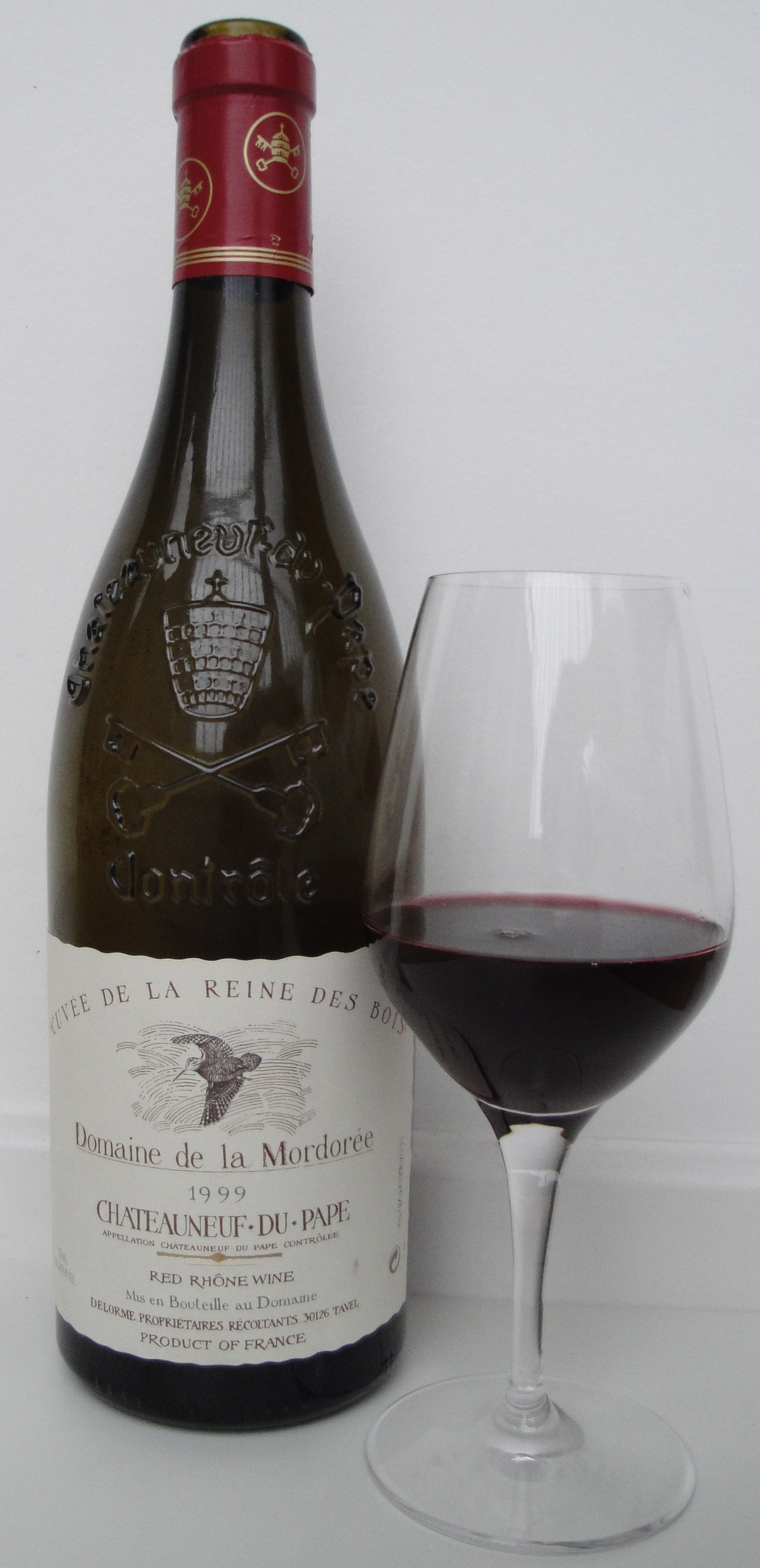
Cuvée de la Reine des Bois from Domaine de la Mordorée.

=== Red wines ===
In most red Châteauneuf-du-Pape, Grenache noir is the most common variety, although some producers use a higher proportion of Mourvèdre. Grenache produces a sweet juice that can have almost a jam-like consistency when very ripe. Syrah is typically blended to provide color and spice, while Mourvèdre can add elegance and structure to the wine. Some estates produce varietal (100%) Grenache noir, while a few producers insist on using at least a token amount of all thirteen originally permitted varieties in their blend. One of the few estates to grow all these varieties and use them consistently in a blend is Château de Beaucastel.

Châteauneuf-du-Pape red wines are often described as earthy with gamey flavors that have hints of tar and leather. The wines are considered tough and tannic in their youth but maintain their rich spiciness as they age. The wines often exhibit aromas of dried herbs common in Provence under the name of garrigue. Châteauneuf-du-Pape dominated by Mourvèdre tend to be higher in tannin and requiring longer cellaring before being approachable.

=== White wines ===
White Châteauneuf-du-Pape is produced by excluding the red varieties and only using the six permitted white varieties. The white varieties account for 7 percent of total plantings according to 2004 statistics, and a portion of the whites grapes are blended into red wines, which means that white wine production only accounts for around 5 percent of the total. In white Châteauneuf-du-Pape, Grenache blanc and Roussanne provides fruitiness and fatness to the blend while Bourboulenc, Clairette and Picpoul add acidity, floral and mineral notes. The style of these wines range from lean and minerally to oily and rich with a variety of aromas and flavor notes—including almond, star fruit, anise, fennel, honeysuckle and peach. A single varietal, Roussanne, that is matured in an oak aging barrel, is also made by some estates. Most whites are made to be drunk young. Some white Châteauneuf-du-Pape are meant to age and tend to develop exotic aromas and scents of orange peels after 7–8 years.

=== Winemaking styles ===
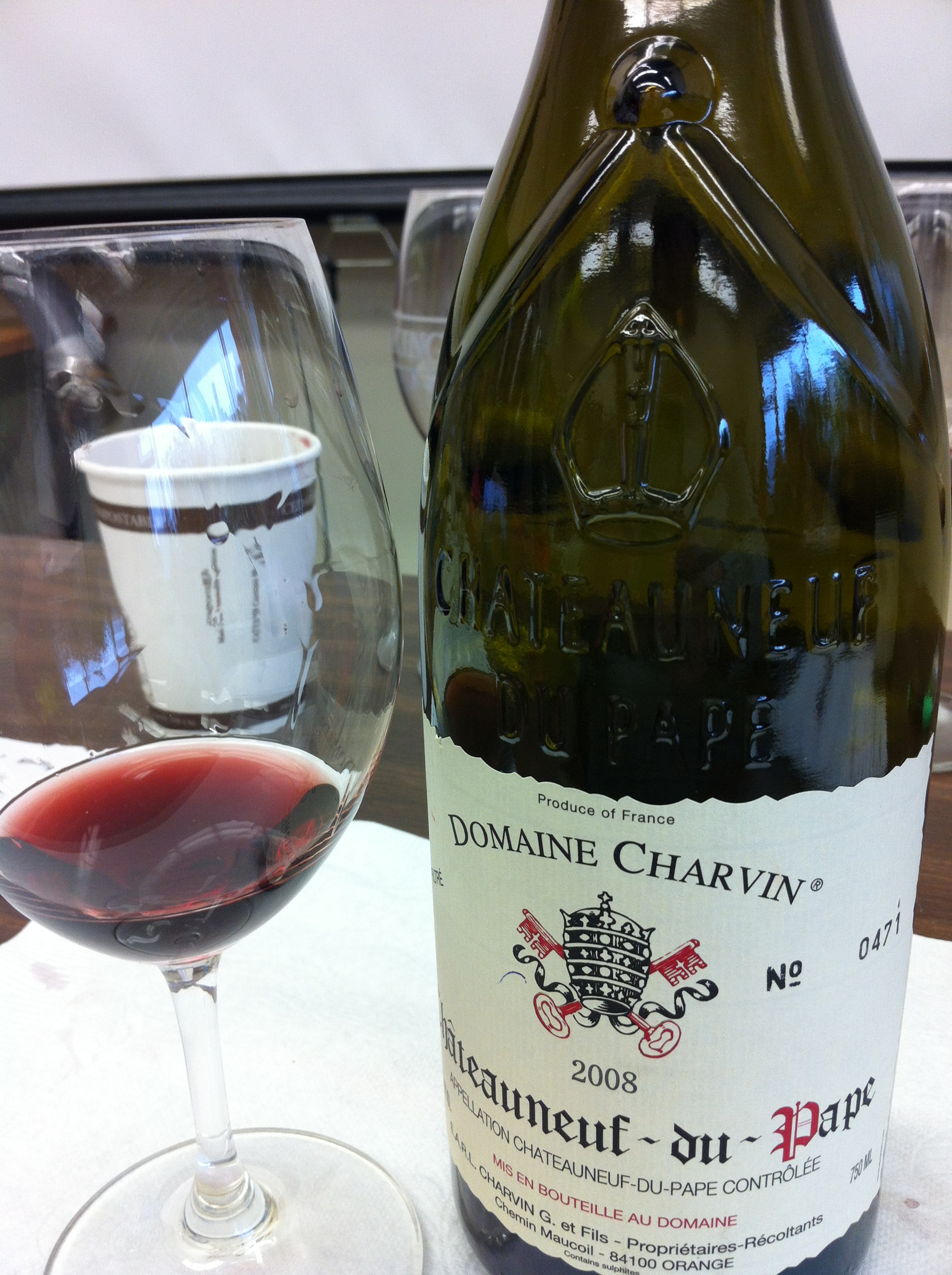
A Châteauneuf-du-Pape with the bottle embossed with papal regalia and insignia.

Châteauneuf-du-Pape wines are often high in alcohol, typically 14-15.5%, and must be minimum 12.5% under the appellation rules with no chaptalization allowed. Winemaking in the region tends to focus on balancing the high sugar levels in the grape with the tannins and phenols that are common in red Châteauneuf-du-Pape. Following harvest, the grape clusters are rarely destemmed prior to fermentation. The fermentation temperatures are kept high, with the skins being frequently pumped over and punched down for the benefit of tannin levels and color extraction to achieve the characteristic dark Châteauneuf color. Beginning in the 1970s, market tendencies to prefer lighter, fruitier wines that can be drunk sooner have prompted some estates to experiment with carbonic maceration. Low yields are considered critical to the success of Châteauneuf-du-Pape with the principal grape varieties tending to make thin and bland wine when produced in higher quantities. The AOC requirements limit yields to 35 hectolitres per hectare, which is nearly half the yields allowed in Bordeaux.

The common technique of using small barrel oak is not widely used in the Châteauneuf-du-Pape area, partly due to the fact that the principal grape Grenache is prone to oxidation in the porous wooden barrels. Instead, Grenache is vinified in large cement tanks, while the other grape varieties are made in large old barrels called foudres that do not impart the same "oaky" characteristics as the smaller oak barrels.
