= Domaine du Vieux Lazaret =

Vineyard in the Rhône Valley, France

Domaine du Vieux Lazaret is a vineyard spanning over 250 acres (1.0 km^{2}) in the Rhône Valley in southern France. It was originally the site of a Lazarist hospice in the eighteenth century.

== History ==
The origin of the name Vieux Lazaret dates back to the 18th century, when a hospice (or Lazaret) existed in the village of Châteauneuf-du-Pape. This hospice, provided by the Lazarists, offered comfort and shelter for the poor and infirm. The Lazarists were a silent order of monks, which were founded in 1625 by St Vincent de Paul to look after the sick and the needy in the French countryside.

The buildings eventually fell into disuse, and were sold by the commune during the 19th century to the Quiot family. Afterwards, the Quiot family used the structures as agricultural buildings.

=== Modernization ===
While originally situated in the village of Châteauneuf-du-Pape near other properties owned by the Quiot family, these original buildings have today been extended and modernized, and now form the main center of the agricultural activities of Vignobles Jérôme Quiot.

== Vineyard ==
The Domaine du Vieux Lazaret is the largest estate in Châteauneuf-du-Pape, and covers over 250 acres (100 ha) in 35 different parcels for the production of Châteauneuf-du-Pape AOC. Due to its size, the vineyard covers a complex variety of soil types. Modern winemaking techniques, along with rigorous selection, are employed in this area to produce wine. The Quiot family has owned vineyards in this region for over 200 years.
