= Muscardin =

Variety of grape

- Grape (Vitis)
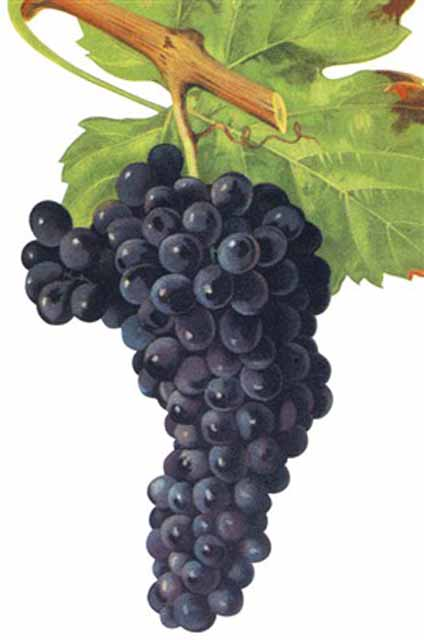
- Muscardin in Viala & Vermorel
- Color of berry skin: Noir
- Species: Vitis vinifera
- Also called: Muscadin, Muscardin Noir
- Origin: France
- Notable regions: Southern Rhône
- Notable wines: Châteauneuf-du-Pape
- VIVC number: 8184

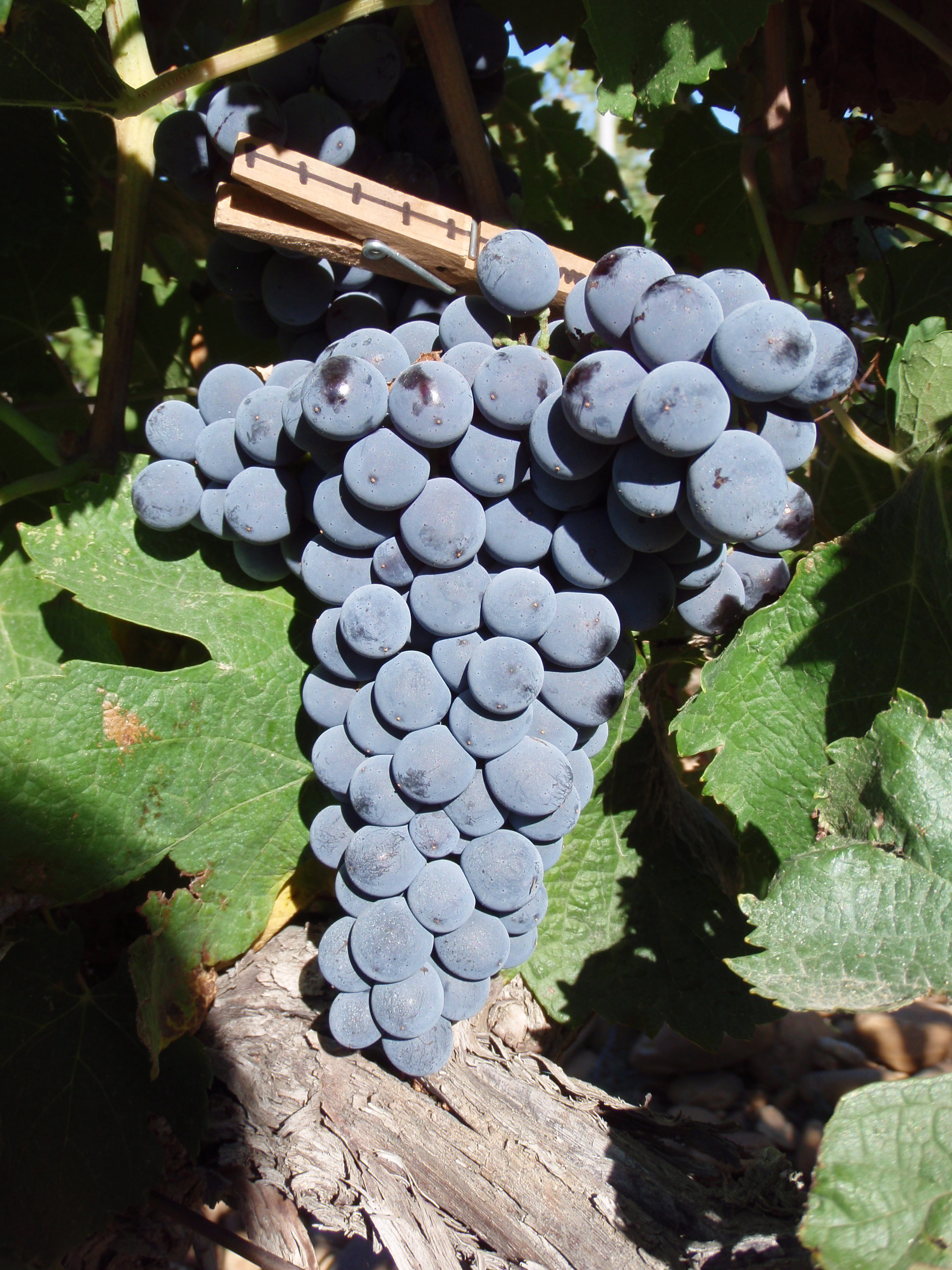
Muscardin grapes

Muscardin is a dark-skinned grape variety primarily found in the southern part of the Rhône region. It is primarily noted for being one of the thirteen grape varieties permitted in the Châteauneuf-du-Pape appellation. It is a very rare variety, and in 2004 only 0.4% of the appellation's vineyards were planted with Muscardin.

The resulting red wines tends to have high acid levels, low alcohol, light tannic structure but can show attractive flowery aromas. The color is also lighter than most Rhone varieties and the wine is prone to the wine fault of oxidation.

== Synonyms ==
Muscardin is also known under the synonyms Muscadin and Muscardin noir.
