= Counoise =

Variety of grape

- Grape (Vitis)
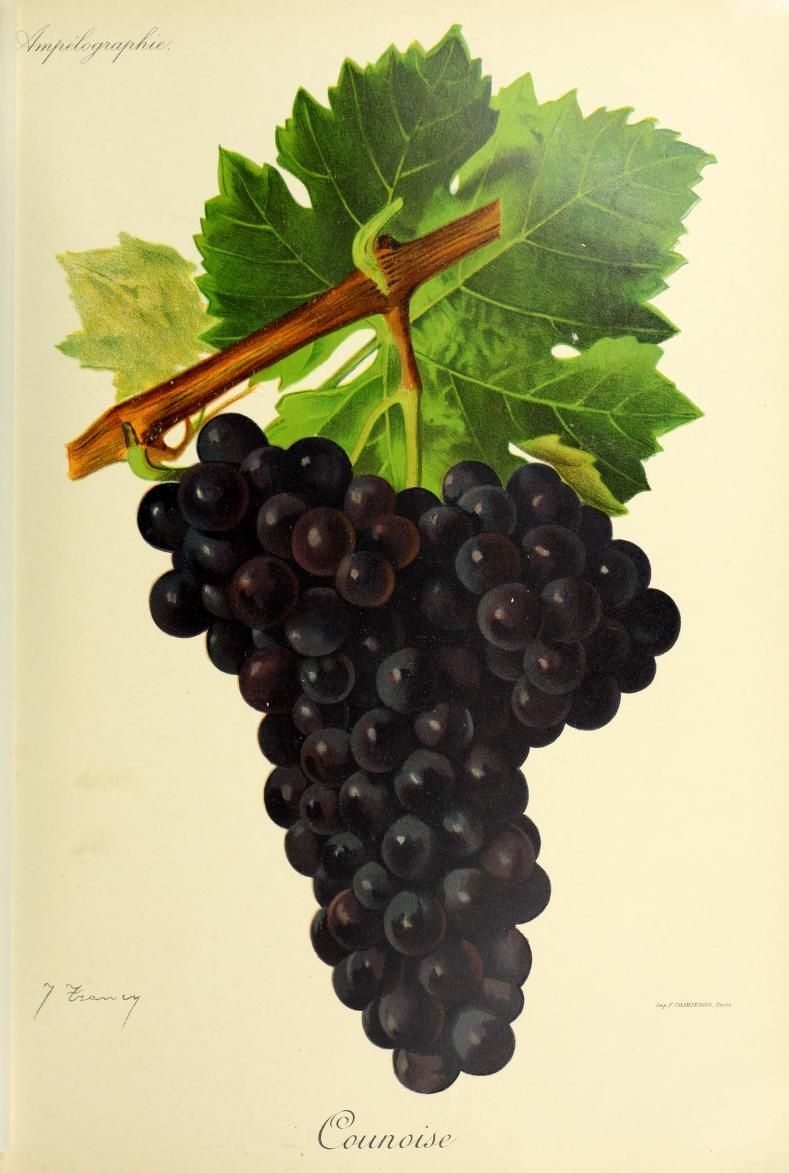
- Counoise in Viala & Vermorel
- Color of berry skin: Noir
- Species: Vitis vinifera
- Origin: France
- Notable regions: Rhône valley
- Notable wines: Châteauneuf-du-Pape
- VIVC number: 3210

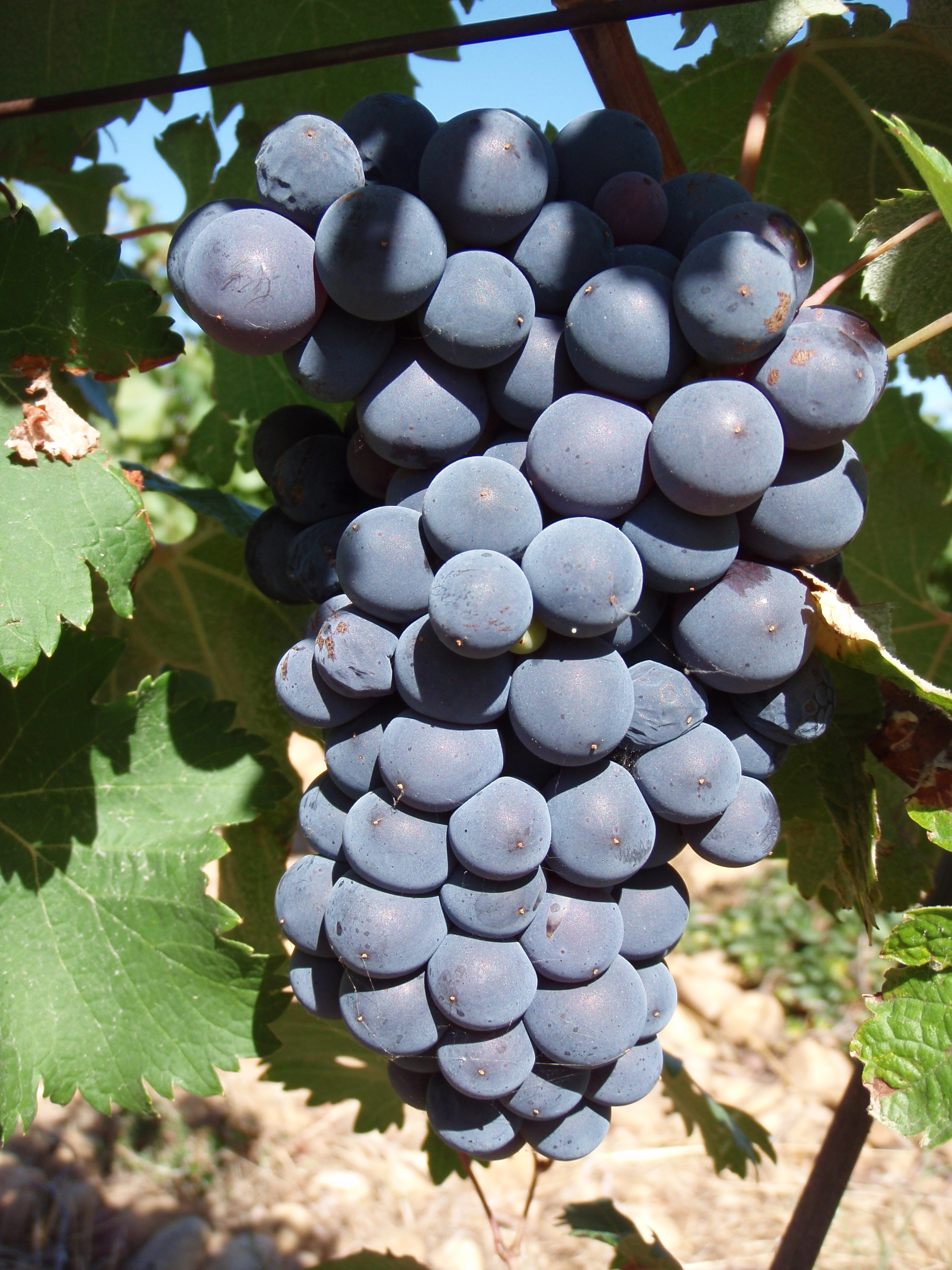
Counoise grapes

Counoise is a dark-skinned wine grape grown primarily in the Rhône valley region of France. Counoise is also grown in California, Texas, New Jersey, and Washington. Counoise adds a peppery note and good acidity to a blended red wine, but does not have much depth of colour or tannin. There were 638 hectares (1,580 acres) of Counoise in France in 2000.

Counoise is one of the grapes allowed into the blend of Châteauneuf-du-Pape wine. In 2004 only 0.5% of the appellation's area was planted with Counoise. Some producers who favour the variety use about 5% of it in their blends, and those account for most of the plantings. One such producer is Château de Beaucastel, which is noted for using all the 13 allowed varieties.

== Counoise and Aubun ==
Counoise is easily confused with Aubun, because of a large similarity in the vineyards. Counoise and Aubun were also grown mixed in a field blend in some older vineyards. However, Counoise is considered to be a grape of higher quality, while Aubun has a reputation for giving simpler wines.

== Synonyms ==
Synonyms for Counoise include Aubon, Caula, Conese, Connoges, Connoise, Couneso, Counoise noir, Counoiso, Counoueiso, Damas noir, Grosse Rogettaz, Guenoise, Moustardier, Quennoise.

Counoise is also listed as a synonym for Aubun, most likely due to confusion between the two in the vineyard.
