= Cinsaut =

Variety of grape

- Grape (Vitis)
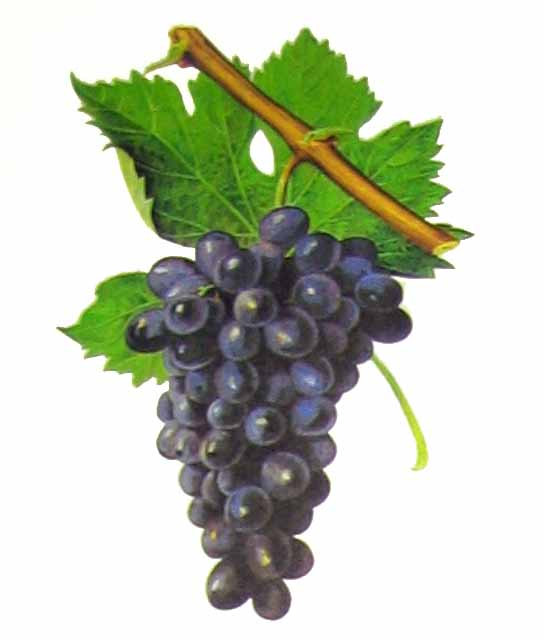
- Cinsaut in Viala & Vermorel
- Color of berry skin: Noir
- Species: Vitis vinifera
- Also called: Cinsault, Cinq Sao, Ottavianello
- Origin: France
- Notable regions: Southern France, Morocco, Algeria, Lebanon
- Notable wines: Chateau Musar, Ostuni Ottavianello
- VIVC number: 2672

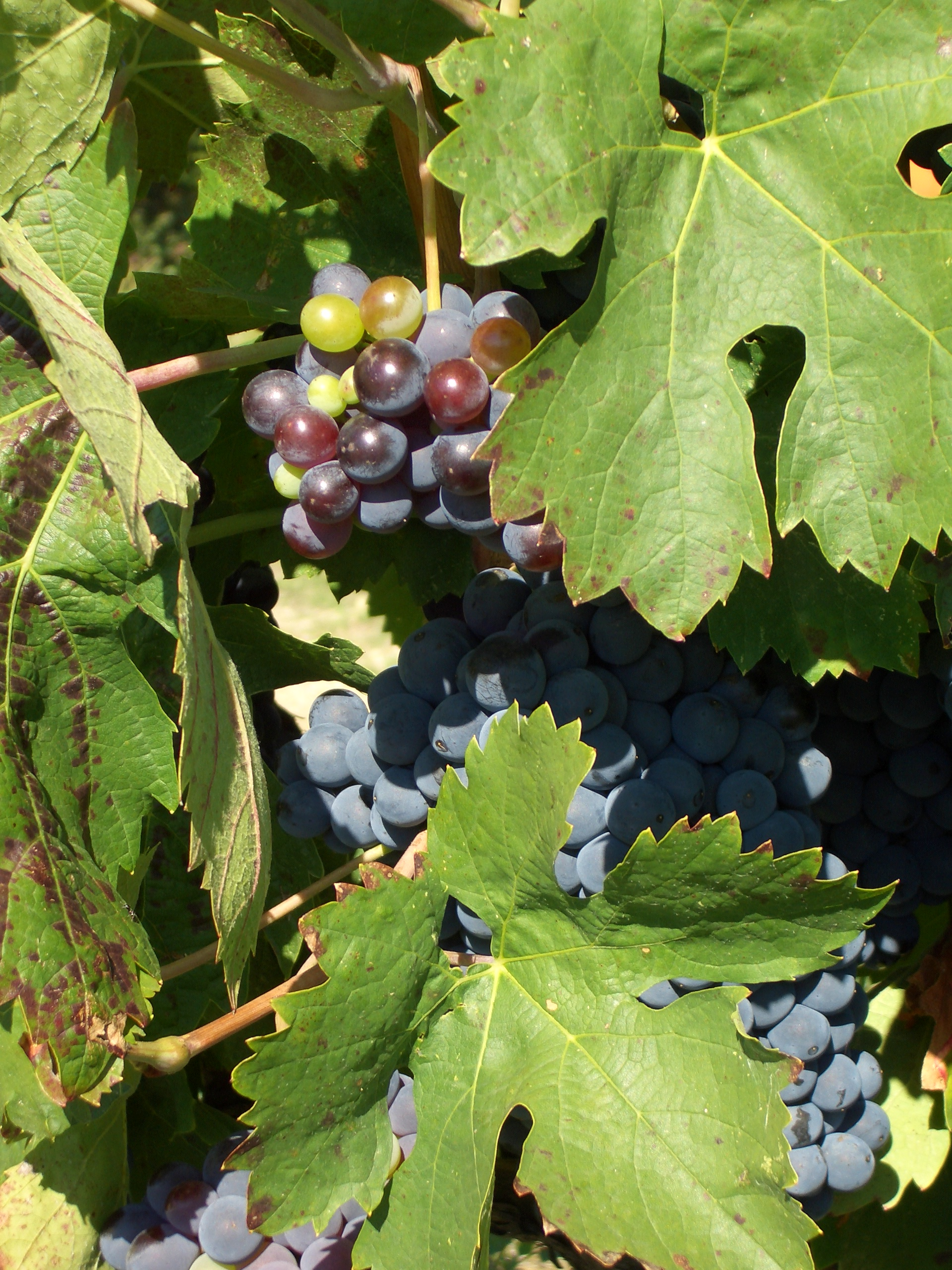
Cinsaut growing in the Côtes du Luberon

Cinsaut or Cinsault (/ˈsænsoʊ/ SAN-soh, French: [sɛ̃so]) is a red wine grape whose heat tolerance and productivity make it important in Languedoc-Roussillon and the former French colonies of Algeria, Lebanon, and Morocco. It is often blended with grapes such as Grenache and Carignan to add softness and bouquet.

It has many synonyms, of which perhaps the most confusing is its sale as a table grape called 'Oeillade', although it is different from the "true" Oeillade which is no longer cultivated. In South Africa, it was known as "Hermitage", hence the name of its most famous cross Pinotage.

== History ==
Cinsaut appears to be an ancient variety that may have originated in the Hérault, but could equally have been brought by traders from the eastern Mediterranean.

== Distribution and wines ==
=== Algeria ===
Cinsaut is popular in Algeria for its drought resistance, and is used to make large volumes of wine.

=== Australia ===
Cinsaut is grown under a variety of names such as Black Prince, Blue Imperial, Oeillade and Ulliade.

=== Chile ===
Old Cinsault vines in the Itata Valley have recently been rediscovered by quality wine producers in Chile, such as Miguel Torres, Clos de Fous, Ventisquero and Undurraga. In one of the southernmost wine-producing areas of the country, the grape yields light-bodied, fruit-driven wines, most often varietal, but sometimes blended with Pais or Carignan.

=== France ===
Cinsaut is the fourth most widely planted grape variety in France, and is especially important in Languedoc-Roussillon. It is also widely used for rosé wines in Provence.

=== Italy ===
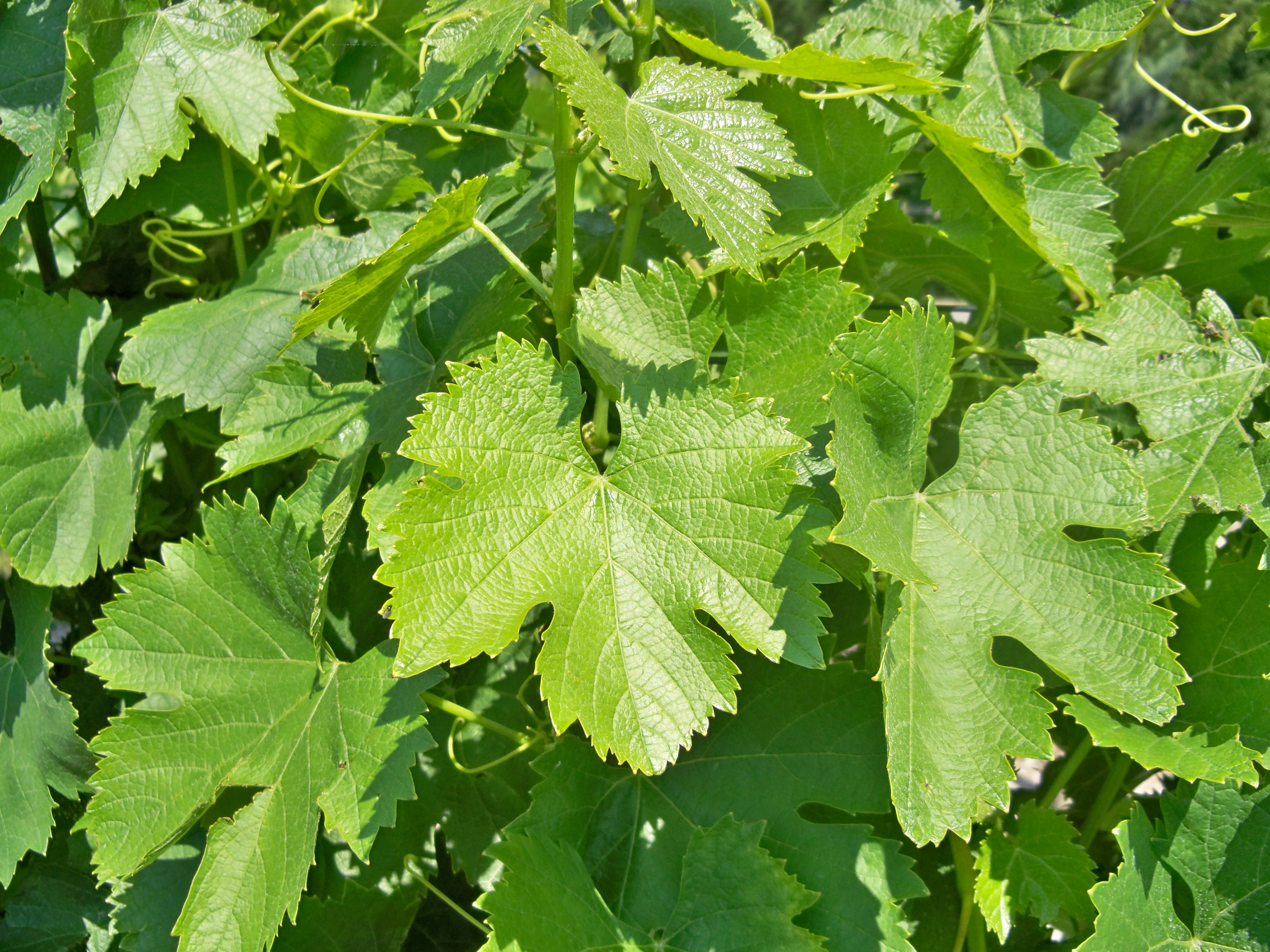
Cinsaut vines.

Known as Ottavianello, there is one tiny DOC devoted to Cinsaut - Ostuni Ottavianello, with a total production of less than 1000 cases a year. However, Cinsaut has long been used in Apulian blends and has also begun to attract the attention of winemakers interested in reviving old varieties.

=== Lebanon ===
Cinsaut is an important component in the blend of Lebanon's Chateau Musar.

=== Morocco and Tunisia ===
As in Algeria, Cinsaut is popular in Morocco and Tunisia for its drought resistance.

=== South Africa ===
A lot of Cinsaut is grown in South Africa, much of which is blended with Cabernet Sauvignon. It holds a special place in the country's viticulture alongside Pinot noir as one of the parents of Pinotage. Of all the grape varieties planted in the Cape, Cinsault has claimed a significant "Cinderella" turnaround in recent history. Historically, it was favored for its heat tolerance and productivity to be used in bulk blends but winemakers of late have been experimenting with the grape. Many new labels can be found on the market offering crunchy red berry flavors at low alcohols, it is still a very useful blending component with other Rhone varietals, while also adding some fruity brightness to Cabernet Sauvignon.

=== United States ===
The oldest continuous Cinsaut vineyard is said to be the Bechtold vineyard in Lodi, California, which was planted in 1886 by Joseph Spenker.

Some Cinsaut is planted in California as Black Malvoisie.

Cinsaut is planted in the North Coast AVA and Sierra Foothills AVA in California, most specifically in the Red Hills Lake County AVA and the El Dorado AVA respectively.

Cinsaut is planted in the Yakima Valley AVA in Washington.

Cinsaut is planted in Texas, specifically in the Texas High Plains A.V.A.

== Vine and viticulture ==
The vine can produce heavy crops, but wines are much better if yields are controlled. Cinsaut is very drought resistant but can be susceptible to disease, so appreciates a dry climate. It produces large cylindrical bunches of black grapes with fairly thick skins.

== Synonyms and confusion with other grapes ==
Black Malvoisie, Blue Imperial, Bourdales Kek, Budales, Calibre, Chainette, Cincout, Cinq-sao, Cinquien, Cinsanet, Cinsault, Cubilier, Cubillier, Cuviller, Espagne, Espagnol, Froutignan, Grappu De La Dordogne, Hermitage, Malaga Kek, Marocain, Maurange, Mavro Kara Melkii, Milhau, Morterille noire, Moustardier Noir, Navarro, Negru De Sarichioi, Oeillade noire, Ottavianello, Ottaviano, Ottavianello, Pampous, Papadou, Passerille, Pedaire, Picardan noir, Piquepoul D'Uzes, Pis De Chevre, Plant D Arles Boudales, Plant D'Arles, Plant De Broqui, Plant De Broquies, Poupe De Crabe, Pousse De Chevre Rouge, Prunaley, Prunelas, Prunella, Prunellas noir, Salerne, Samsó, Samson, Senso, Sensu, Sinsó, Strum, Takopulo Kara, Ulliaou, West's White Prolific, Black Prince, Boudales, Oeillade, Picardin noir and Ulliade.

While Cinsault is known under the synonym Oeillade noire, especially when it is sold as a table grape, it is not related to the Languedoc and Provence wine grape Oeillade noire.
