= Mutage =

Wine making technique

Mutage /ˈmjuːtɪdʒ/ MEW-tij is a wine making technique for making sweet wines.

== Typical mechanism ==
The typical process involves the addition of alcohol to the must so that the fermentation process is prematurely stopped. Most yeasts die when the alcohol content in their environment is raised to approximately 13–15%. By stopping the fermentation of sugars, a sweet taste of the wine is achieved. This technique is used to make port wine and other sweet wines with high alcohol content.

== Types of mutage ==
Two types of mutage are sometimes distinguished. A distinction being made between adding alcohol to the must before fermentation and adding during fermentation.

1. Mutage sur grain: Where the mutage takes place during maceration on the skins. This is described as mutage on the cap of the marc and produces vin de liqueur
2. Mutage after the traditional maceration and pressing producing vin doux naturel.

== Noted wines referred to as having been made by mutage ==
Reds

- Banyuls
- Maury
- Rivesaltes

Whites

- Muscat de Beaumes de Venise
- Muscat de Rivesaltes
- Muscat de Frontignan

== Other techniques ==
Other techniques for making sweet wines exist such as vendange tardive, the noble rot, various filtration techniques or early heating of the must, and adding sweet musts after fermentation.

== See also ==
- Fortified wine
- Vin de liqueur
- Vin doux naturel
