= Rivesaltes AOC =

French wine appellation

Coordinates: 42.7697°N 2.8747°E

- Wine region
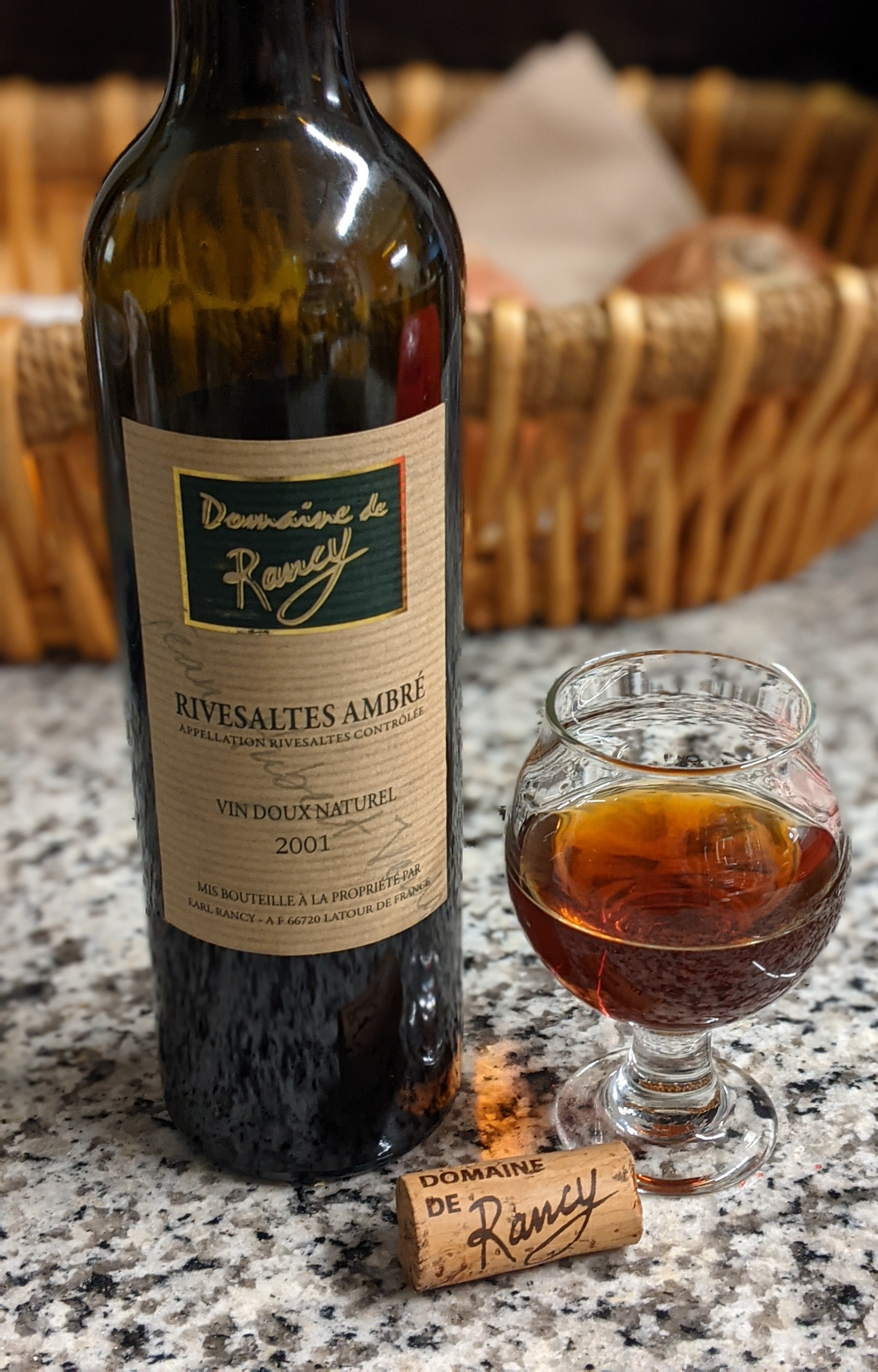
- A 2001 Rivesaltes Ambré
- Type: AOC - AOP
- Year established: 1936, 1972
- Country: France
- Part of: Languedoc-Roussillon
- Soil conditions: Poor and dry
- Size of planted vineyards: 5,200 ha (13,000 acres)
- Varietals produced: Grenache noir, Grenache gris, Grenache blanc, Macabeu, Malvoisie du Roussillon
- No. of wineries: 1,787 harvest declarants and 174 cellars
- Wine produced: 127,000 hl (2,800,000 imp gal; 3,400,000 US gal)
- Comments: Produces red or white vin doux naturel

Rivesaltes (/ˈriːvˈsɔːlt/; French pronunciation: [ʁivzalt]) is an appellation d'origine contrôlée (AOC) for naturally sweet, fortified wines (vin doux naturel or VDN). The name refers to both a production region within Languedoc-Roussillon in southern France, and the style of sweet wines produced there.

The Rivesaltes AOC designation of origin has been protected by INAO since 1972, combining several smaller protected designations created in 1936.

== Grapes and styles ==
Rivesaltes AOC wines are similar to Muscat de Rivesaltes AOC wines, except the grape varieties are not restricted to Muscat. The wines are red or white. Rivesaltes blanc, using white grapes, appears amber in color, while Rivesaltes rouge appears darker.

The main grapes used for white Rivesaltes wines are Grenache blanc, Grenache gris, Macabeu, and Malvoisie du Roussillon; Muscat Blanc à Petits Grains and Muscat of Alexandria are accessory varietals, which have to be less than 20 percent of the final product. The only grapes allowed for red Rivesaltes wines are Grenache noir, Grenache blanc, Grenache gris, Macabeu, and Malvoisie du Roussillon.

Styles can be labeled ambré (amber), grenat (garnet), tuilé (tiled), or rosé, provided they meet certain conditions. These wines can also be labeled rancio (aged) or hors d'âge (beyond age) provided they meet further conditions.

Rivesaltes style requirements:

- Rivesaltes grenat: The must is macerated for all or part of fermentation. It must have 75 percent Grenache noir and storage in an oxidative environment for a 12-month minimum, including 3 months in bottles.
- Rivesaltes ambré: The must is separated from the pulp before fermentation. It must age in an oxidative environment for a 2-year minimum.
- Rivesaltes tuilé: Red wine with at least 50 percent Grenache noir, aged in an oxidative environment for a 2-year minimum.
- Rivesaltes hors d'âge: Rivesaltes ambré or tuilé aged for 5 years.
- Rivesaltes rancio: Wines which, depending on aging conditions, have acquired a "rancio" taste.

== Consumption, flavor, and aromas ==
Rivesaltes often has aromas and flavors of raisins and other dried fruit, nuts, smoke, resin, chocolate, and caramel, browned sugar or molasses. Rivesaltes made with white grapes can gain aromas of vanilla, baked cherries, and honey. Rivesaltes, especially Rivesaltes rancio, has an aged, umami, bitter quality found in aged cognac, armagnac, and whisky, called rancio. Due to the winemaking process, Rivesaltes is relatively shelf-stable when open, and can remain at room-temperature for several days without losing quality.

According to prominent négociant Philippe Gayral, Rivesaltes is optimal at 50 years of age, and needs a minimum of 20 years before its tannins soften enough.

Rivesaltes can have an affordable price, sometimes less than €10 (about $13 USD) a bottle. Some of these, especially the related Muscat de Rivesaltes, are not considered quality wines.

Rivesaltes is typically served slightly chilled.

== Geography ==
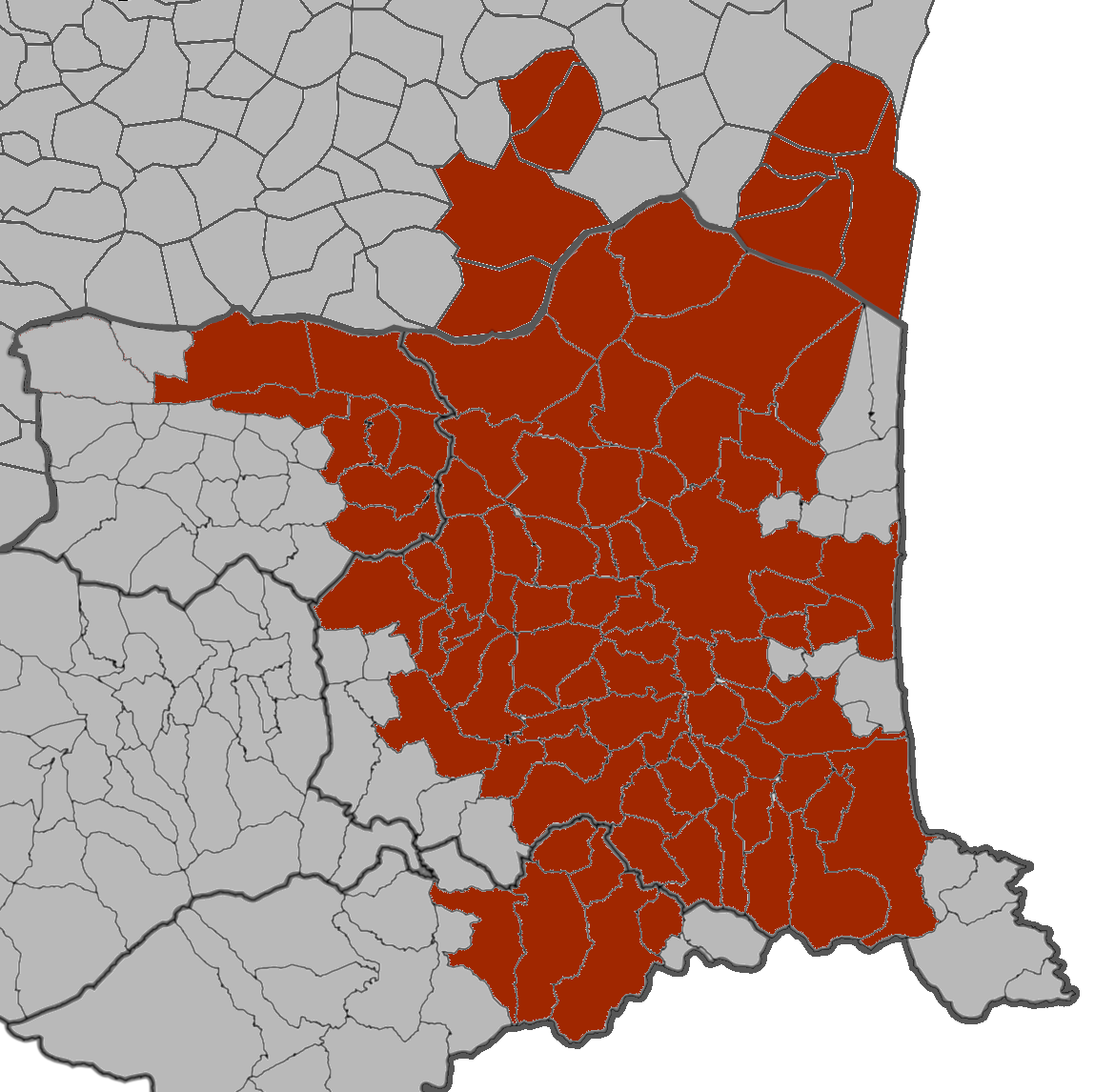
Map of Rivesaltes AOC within the Pyrénées-Orientales and Aude departments

Rivesaltes is made in the Languedoc-Roussillon wine region, around the commune of Rivesaltes in southern France, historically and culturally part of Northern Catalonia.

The region has about 5,200 ha (13,000 acres). It is predominantly located over a large portion of the Pyrénées Orientales, extending over 85 communes in the Pyrénées Orientales and 9 communes in the Aude, to the north. The Rivesaltes region borders the foothills of the Canigó to the west, the Mediterranean to the east, and Spain to the south. The region has a wide variety of soil types: granite, gneiss, and brown and black schists around the Agly Massif in the northwest and at the foot of the Albera Massif. There are also red limestone soils by the Corbières Massif, sandy soil by Les Aspres, and stony terraces along the region's rivers. Rivesaltes AOC is crossed by three rivers that traverse the area from west to east, draining into the Mediterranean. They are, listed north to south: the Agly, Têt, and Tech. Vineyards in the region are commonly on terraces and hills.

Rivesaltes AOC has a Mediterranean climate, with hot and dry summers. Rain averages 500–600 mm (20–24 in) annually, spread over few days in spring and fall. The region has about 300 days or 2,555 hours of sunshine each year, called the sunniest in France. It is affected every third day by the Tramontane breeze from the northwest, which dries the region's grapevines, and the rest of the time by sea winds.

== Winemaking ==
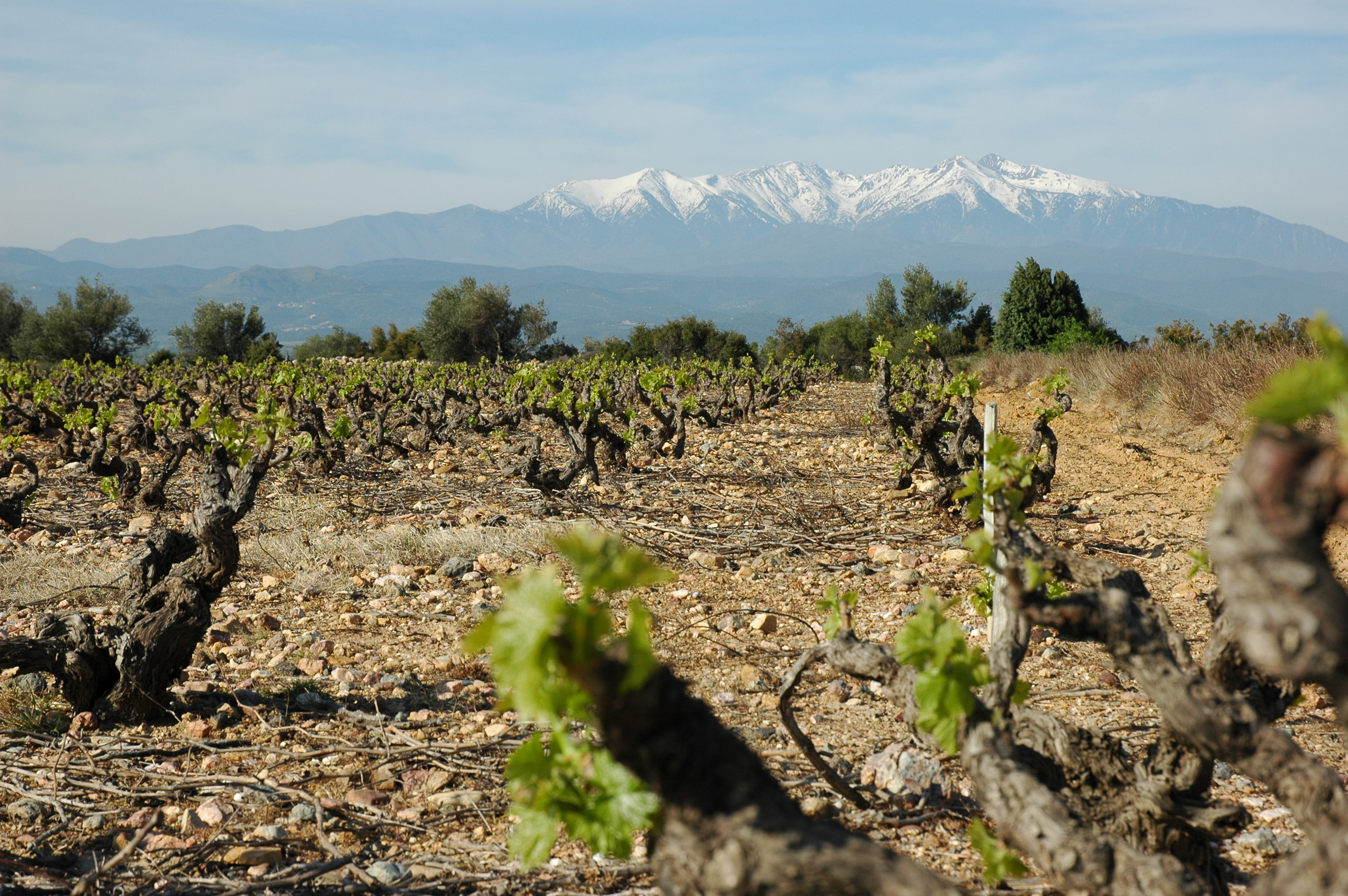
A vineyard in Rivesaltes AOC, by the Canigó

The production process, known in France as mutage, is similar to that used to make Port, and dates to the 13th century. A neutral grape spirit is added to the must to halt fermentation while sugar levels are still high, preserving the natural sweetness of the grape. The wines are then matured, sometimes in oak barrels, or typically outside in glass bottles (called demijohns or bonbonnes) for a year. While in the sealed bottles, the wine is exposed to sun, rain, temperature swings, and extreme weather; the heat allows the wine to maderise. The wine then matures in barrels for a minimum of four years. The resulting wine bears a similarity to tawny port but tends to be lower in alcohol (~16 percent vs. ~20 percent).

While the similar Banyuls and Maury are typically high-quality, Rivesaltes is made in a wide variety of styles, depending on terroir and winemaker skills and preference. Rivesaltes traditionally was made by larger professional wineries and cooperatives, while Banyuls and Maury tended to be made by amateur winemakers but in a more artisanal fashion.

== History ==
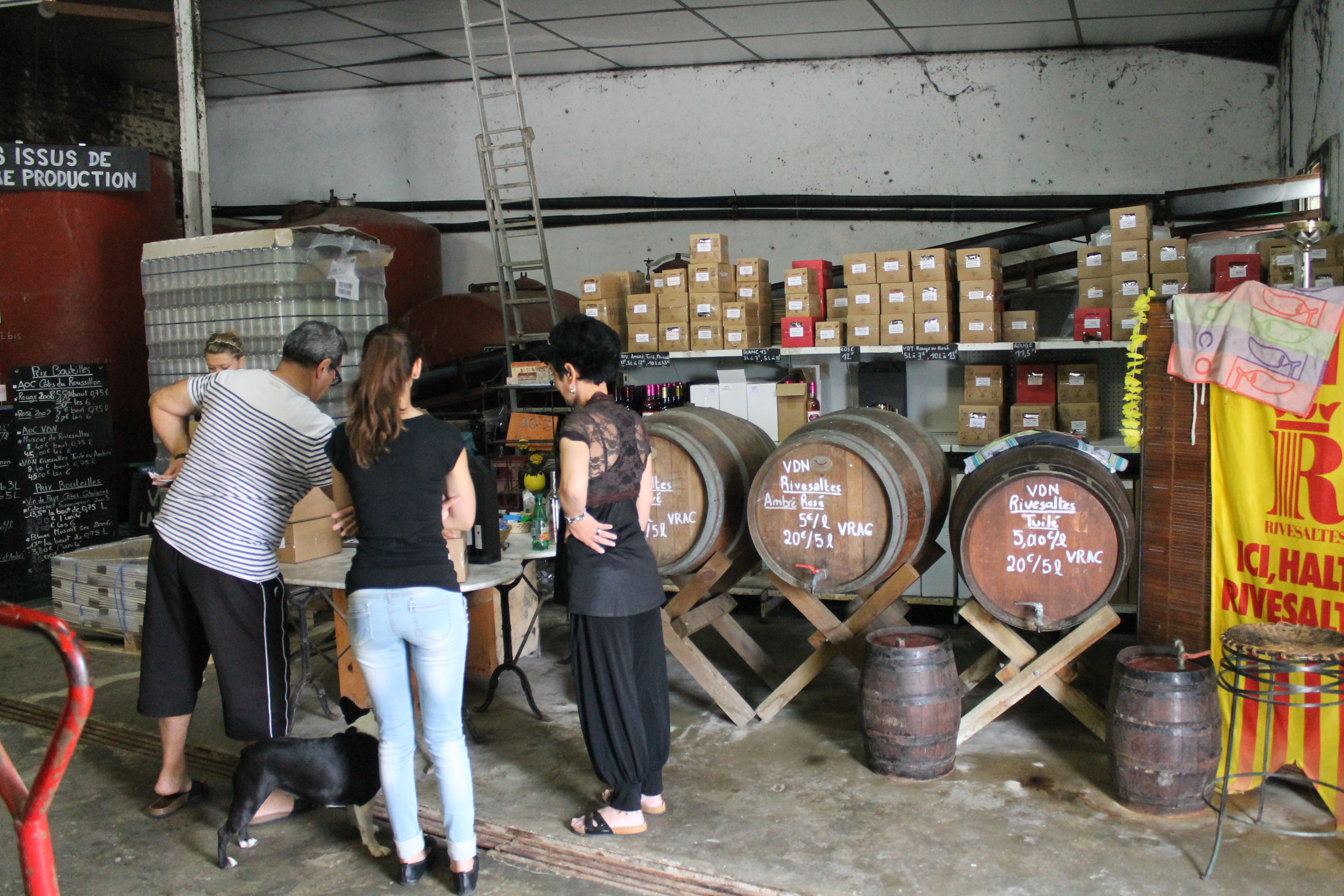
Bulk sale of a variety of VDN wines in Rivesaltes AOC

Rivesaltes AOC was created in 1936. In 1972, a new Rivesaltes AOC was created, combining Rivesaltes, Côtes d'Agly, and Côtes de haut Roussillon.

By the 2020s, global climate change began to affect the climate of Rivesaltes AOC. Among earlier harvest dates in France, vineyard owners in Rivesaltes began harvesting August 5, instead of the more usual September. They also began machine-picking their grapes at nighttime or starting hand-picking at dawn, as daytime temperatures reached 40 °C (104 °F). Weather in 2020 included catastrophic springtime rain, mildew in the summer, and an absence of the Tramontane breeze, followed by drought-like conditions.

== See also ==
- Côtes Catalanes
- Revolt of the Languedoc winegrowers
- List of appellations in Languedoc-Roussillon
