= Beaumes de Venise AOC =

French Rhône Valley wine

Beaumes de Venise
- Wine region
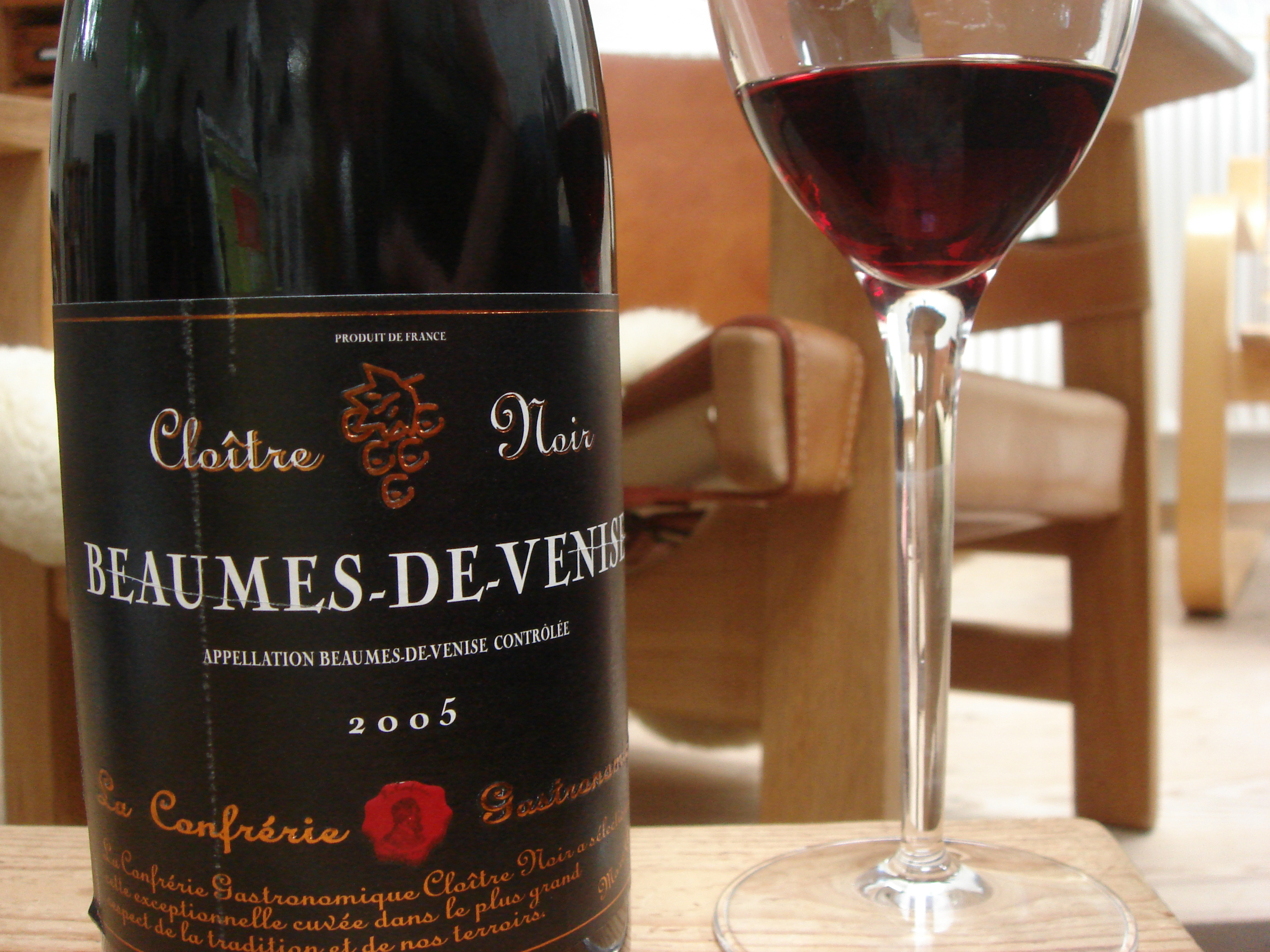
- Official name: Beaumes de Venise AOC
- Type: Appellation d'origine contrôlé
- Year established: Muscat 1943; cru 2005
- Years of wine industry: 2,000
- Country: France
- Part of: Rhône Valley
- Climate region: mediterranea
- Soil conditions: north: sandy loam; south: argilo-calcerous
- Size of planted vineyards: Muscat 503; cru: 541
- No. of vineyards: ca.100
- Wine produced: red; fortified
- Official designation: natural sweet wine (VDN)

Beaumes de Venise (French pronunciation: [bom də vəniz]) is an appellation of wines from the eastern central region of the southern half of the Rhône Valley. It produces wines of two distinctly different types:

1. A sweet fortified wine of the type vin doux naturel (VDN), under the designation Muscat de Beaumes de Venise.

2. A red Côtes du Rhône Villages from the classification of named villages, which typifies the quality wines of the Côtes du Rhône region.

The vines are grown on the slopes around the foot of the Dentelles de Montmirail, a vertical comb of rock jutting out of the plain between the Rhône river and the Luberon-Ventoux mountains. Beaumes is famed for its natural fortified wine made from the Muscat grape, and records of its use go back almost two millennia. More recently it is also the producer of a high quality red wine. In 1943 the natural Sweet Beaumes de Venise Muscat was accorded its appellation d'origine contrôlée (AOC), to be followed in 1956 by an AOC for its Côtes du Rhône. The red, white and rosé wines were elevated to the appellation of Côtes-du-Rhône Villages AOC (named villages) in 1978, and in 2005 the greatest honor of all was bestowed on the region when Beaumes de Venise rouge and the sweet fortified wine Muscat de Beaumes de Venise became a cru - the highest order of the wines in the Rhône Valley. As of 2026 over 100 producers including fifteen domaines and a cooperative winery combine to produce the wines of the appellation.

== Muscat de Beaumes de Venise AOC ==
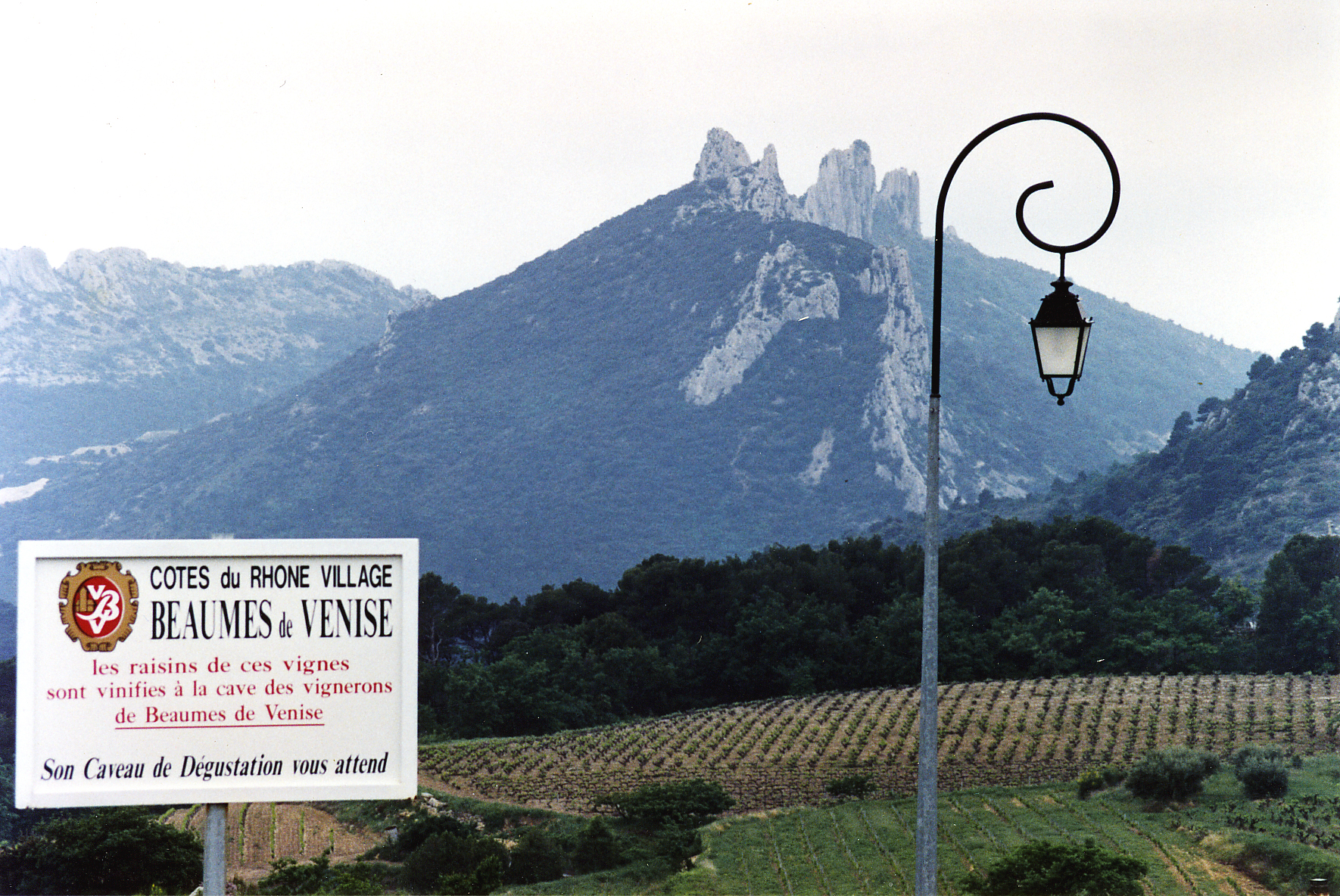
The Dentelles in the background to a sign touting the Côte du Rhône-Villages wines of Beaumes de Venise.

In 1248, St. Louis is claimed to have taken supplies of the local wine with him on his 7th Crusade, and during the early 14th century, at the time of the reign of Pope Clement V, production was increased by 70 hectares to cater for the demand from the Popes' Palace in Avignon.

A unique feature of the way the grapes ripen is the way in which the warmth of the sun reflects and radiates down over the vines from the huge vertical limestone slabs of the Dentelles de Montmirail – the "Lace of Montmirail".

Just under 500 hectares are currently under cultivation. The average yield is approximately 28 hectolitres per hectare.

The wine is produced from a single variety, the small berried Muscat which is also known as the Muscat de Frontignan, and must contain a minimum alcohol level of 15%. Mutage is carried out during the fermentation by the addition of 95° (minimum) proof spirit.

== Beaumes de Venise AOC ==
The vineyard is surrounded by the communes of Beaumes de Venise, Lafare, Suzette, and La Roque-Alric, all in the department of Vaucluse, and is situated on the southeastern flank of the Dentelles de Montmirail at an altitude of 100 to 600 metres. About 100 growers/producers are concerned with the average annual production of around 18,000 hectolitres for an average yield of 33 hectolitres per hectare and the grapes are manually harvested.

Varieties that are blended to produce the red AOC are Grenache noir min. 50%, Syrah 25%, Mourvèdre and other varieties permitted by the appellation to a maximum of 20% with 5% of white grapes.

The minimum degree of alcohol is fixed at 12.5%.

Detailed map of the Rhône wine region, with separate maps of Southern Rhône ("Zoom A") and Northern Rhône ("Zoom B").
