= Maury, Pyrénées-Orientales =

Maury
- Commune
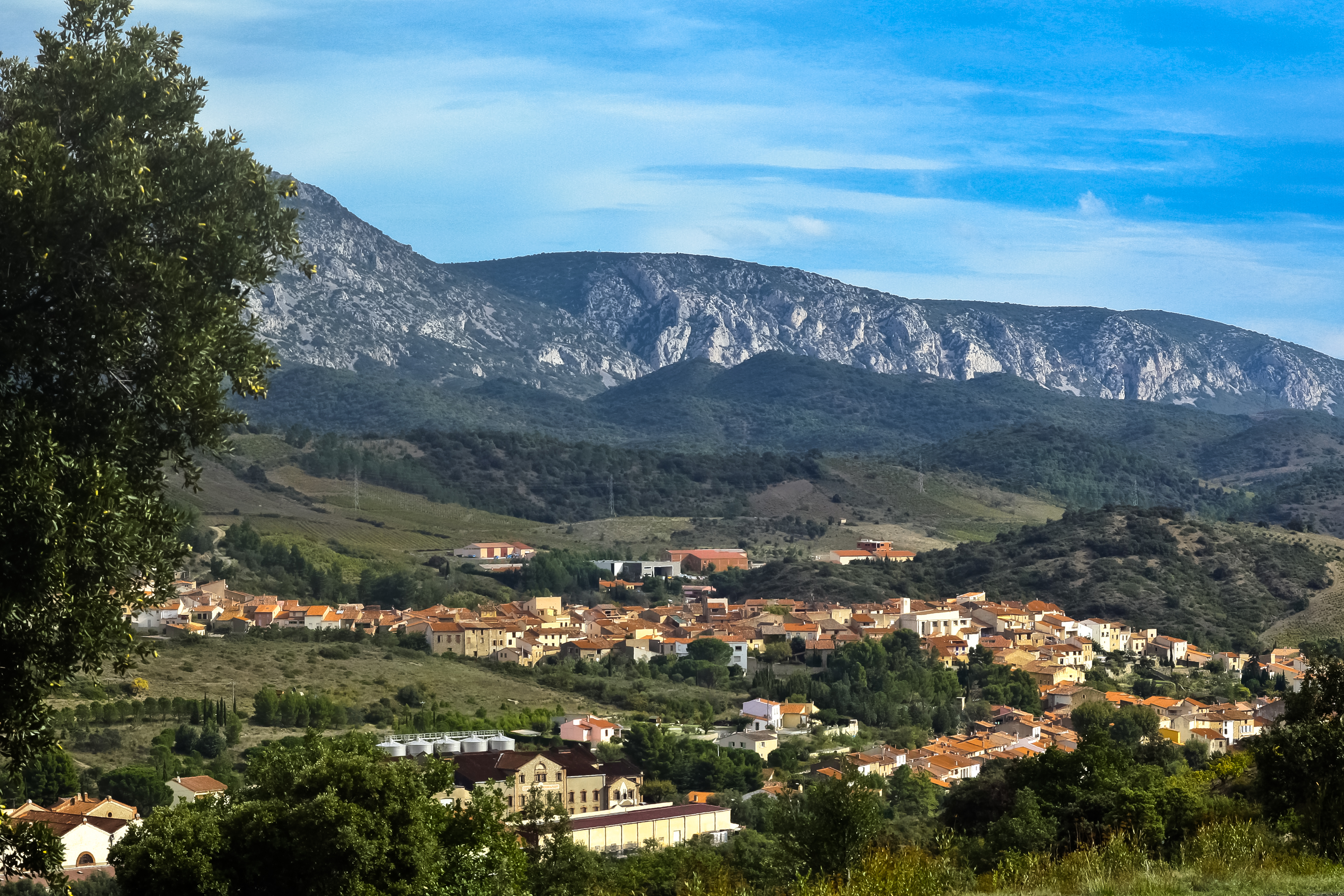
- Maury, seen from the south

- Coat of arms
- Location of Maury
- Location within France Location within Occitanie
- Coordinates: 42°48′44″N 2°35′41″E
- Country: France
- Region: Occitania
- Department: Pyrénées-Orientales
- Arrondissement: Prades
- Canton: La Vallée de l'Agly
- Intercommunality: Agly Fenouillèdes

Government
  - Mayor (2020–2026): Charles Chivilo
- Area^{1}: 34.63 km^{2} (13.37 sq mi)
- Elevation: 146 m (479 ft)
- Highest elevation: 880 m (2,890 ft)
- Lowest elevation: 80 m (260 ft)
- Population (2023): 773
  - Density: 22.3/km^{2} (57.8/sq mi)
- Time zone: UTC+01:00 (CET)
  - Summer (DST): UTC+02:00 (CEST)
- INSEE/Postal code: 66107 /66460
- ^{1} French Land Register data, which excludes lakes, ponds, glaciers > 1 km^{2} (0.386 sq mi or 247 acres) and river estuaries.

Maury (French pronunciation: [moʁi]; Occitan: Maurin; Catalan: Maurí) is a commune in the Pyrénées-Orientales department in southern France.

== Geography ==
Maury is located in the canton of La Vallée de l'Agly and in the arrondissement of Perpignan.

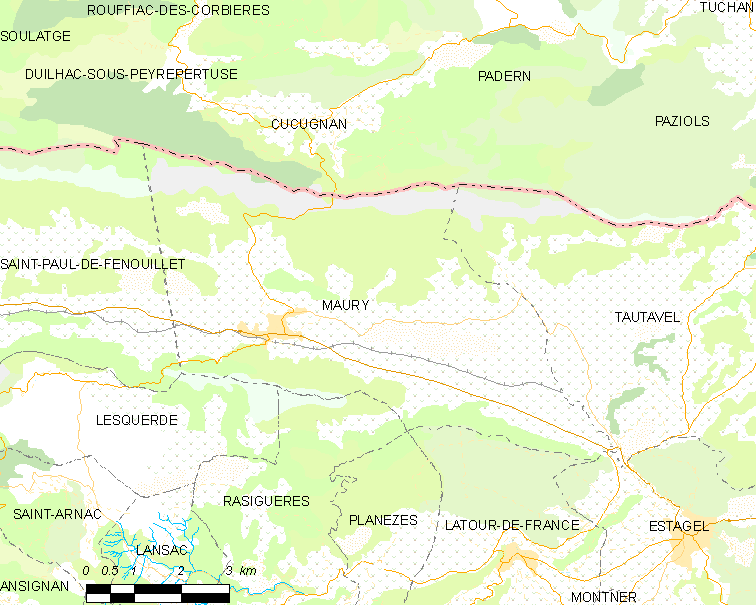
Map of Maury and its surrounding communes

== Population ==
Historical population
Year	Pop.	±% p.a.
1968	1,298	—
1975	1,059	−2.87%
1982	982	−1.07%
1990	916	−0.87%
1999	850	−0.83%
2007	896	+0.66%
2012	840	−1.28%
2017	785	−1.35%
2023	773	−0.26%
Source: INSEE

== See also ==
- Maury AOC
- Communes of the Pyrénées-Orientales department
