= Grenache =

Red wine grape

- Grape (Vitis)
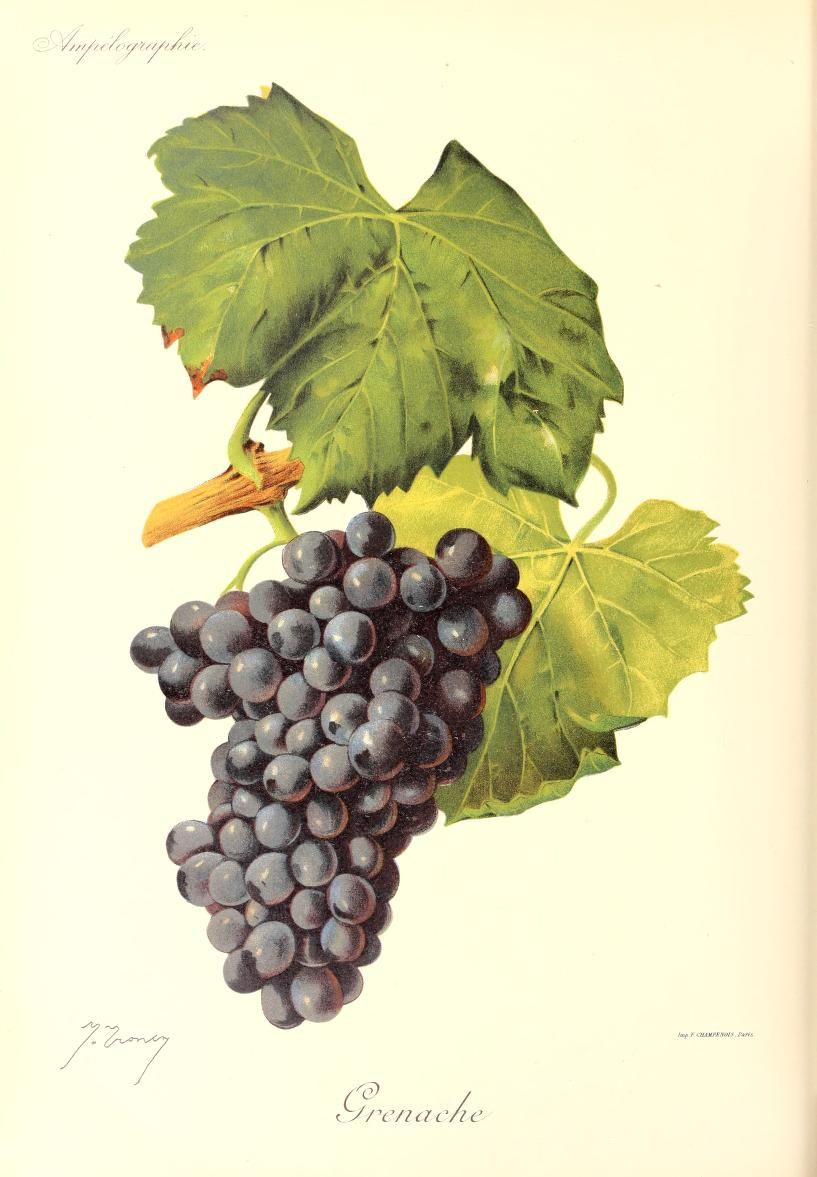
- Grenache noir in Viala & Vermorel
- Color of berry skin: Noir
- Species: Vitis vinifera
- Also called: Garnatxa negre, Alicante, Cannonau, Garnacha tinta, Grenache noir (more)
- Origin: Spain
- Notable regions: Aragon, Alella, Priorat, Roussillon, Rhône, Sardinia, Rioja
- VIVC number: 4461

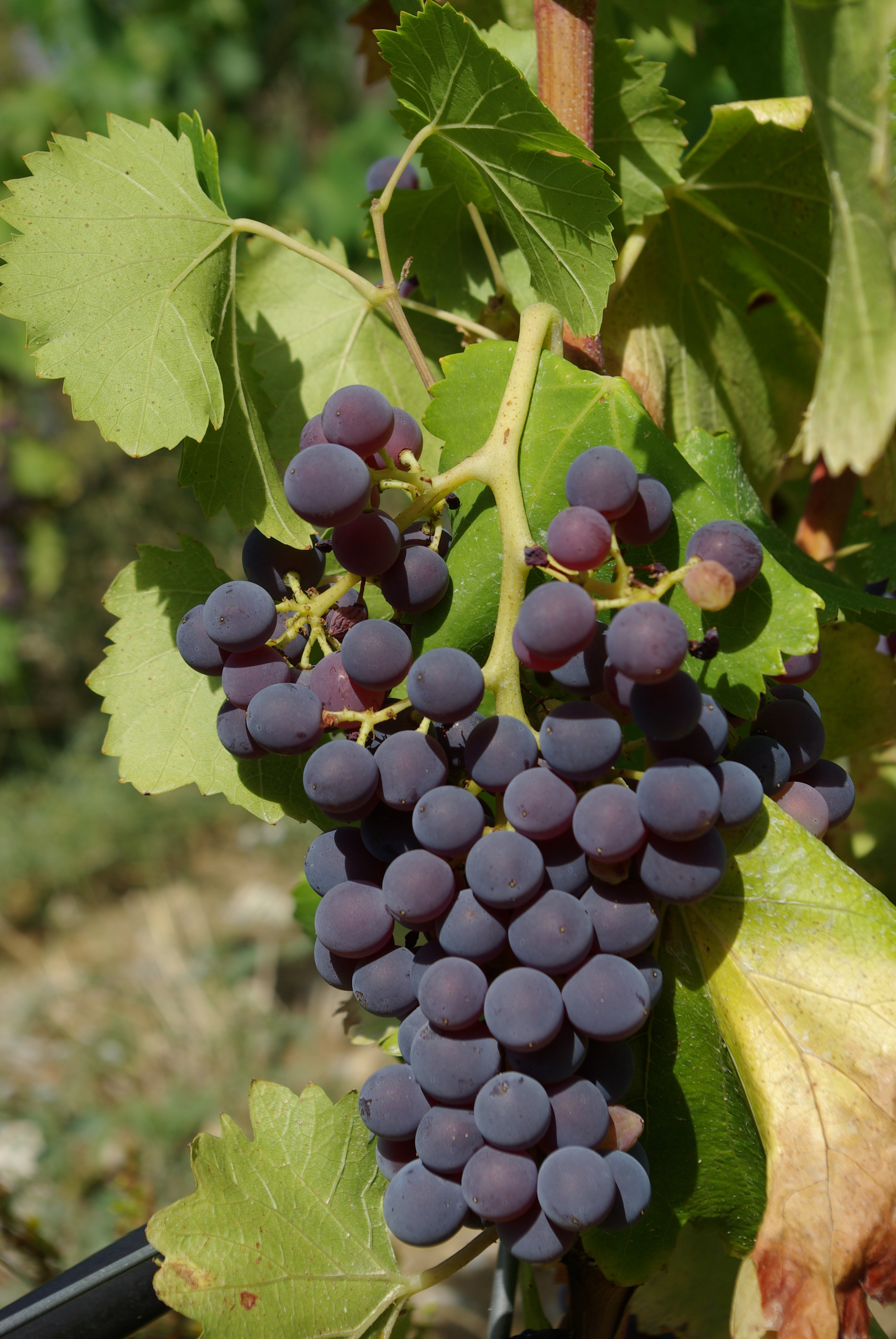
Grenache noir grapes

Grenache (/ɡrəˈnæʃ/, pronounced [ɡʁənaʃ]) or Garnacha (pronounced [ɡaɾˈnatʃa]) is one of the most widely planted red wine grape varieties in the world. It ripens late, so it needs hot, dry conditions such as those found in Spain, where the grape is believed to have originated. It is also grown on the Italian island of Sardinia, in the Colli Berici hills in the Vicenza province of Veneto in Northern Italy where it is known as Tocai Rosso, the south of France, Australia, and California's Monterey AVA, Paso Robles, Santa Barbara County, San Joaquin Valley and Willcox, Arizona.

It is generally spicy, berry-flavored and soft on the palate and produces wine with a relatively high alcohol content, but it needs careful control of yields for best results. Characteristic flavor profiles on Grenache include red fruit flavors (raspberry and strawberry) with a subtle, white pepper spice note. Grenache wines are highly prone to oxidation, with even young examples having the potential to show browning (or "bricking") coloration that can be noticed around the rim when evaluating the wine at an angle in the glass. As Grenache ages the wines tend to take on more leather and tar flavors. Wines made from Grenache tend to lack acid, tannin and color, and it is often blended with other varieties such as Syrah, Carignan, Tempranillo, Mourvèdre and Cinsaut.

In Spain, there are monovarietal wines made of Garnacha tinta (red Grenache), notably in the southern Aragon wine regions of Calatayud, Carinena and Campo de Borja, but it is also used in blends, as in some Rioja wines with tempranillo. Grenache is the dominant variety in most Southern Rhône wines, especially in Châteauneuf-du-Pape, where it is typically over 80% of the blend. In Australia it is typically blended in "GSM" blends with Syrah and Mourvèdre with old vine examples in McLaren Vale. In Italy, the Sardinian D.O.C. wine Cannonau di Sardegna is by law 90% local Grenache (Cannonau in Sardinian). Grenache is also used to make rosé wines in France and Spain, notably those of the Tavel district in the Côtes du Rhône and those of the Navarre region. And the high sugar levels of Grenache have led to extensive use in fortified wines, including the red vins doux naturels of Roussillon such as Banyuls, and as the basis of most Australian fortified wine.h

== History ==
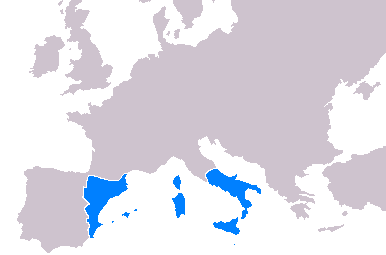
The early history of Grenache is closely linked to the lands under the Crown of Aragon.

Grenache or Garnacha (as it is known in Spain) most likely originated in the region of Aragon in northern Spain, according to ampelographical evidence. Plantings probably spread from the original birthplace to Catalonia and other lands under the Crown of Aragon such as Sardinia and Roussillon in southern France. An early synonym for the vine was Tinto Aragonés (red of Aragon). The grape is known as Cannonau in Sardinia, where it is claimed that it originated there according to recent archaeological finds, and spread to other Mediterranean lands under Aragon rule. Grenache, under its Spanish synonym Garnacha, was already well established on both sides of the Pyrenees when the Roussillon region was annexed by France. From there the vine made its way through the Languedoc and to the Southern Rhone region where it was well established by the 19th century. Despite its prevalence in nearby Navarre and Catalonia, Garnacha was not widely planted in the Rioja till the early 20th century as vineyards were replanted following the phylloxera epidemic.

Grenache was one of the first varieties to be introduced to Australia in the 18th century and eventually became the country's most widely planted red wine grape variety until it was surpassed by Shiraz in the mid-1960s. Early Australian Grenache was a main component of the sweet fortified wines that were the lynchpin of the early Australian wine industry. In the 19th century, California wine growers prized the vine's ability to produce high yields and withstand heat and drought conditions. The grape was extensively planted throughout the hot San Joaquin Valley where it was mainly used as a blending component for pale, sweet jug wines. In the late 20th century, the Rhone Rangers movement brought attention to the production of premium varietal Grenache and Rhone style blends modeled after the Grenache dominate wines of Châteauneuf-du-Pape. In the early 20th century, Grenache was one of the first Vitis vinifera grapes to be successfully vinified during the early development of the Washington wine industry with a 1966 Yakima Valley rosé earning mention in wine historian Leon Adams treatise The Wines of America.

== Viticulture ==
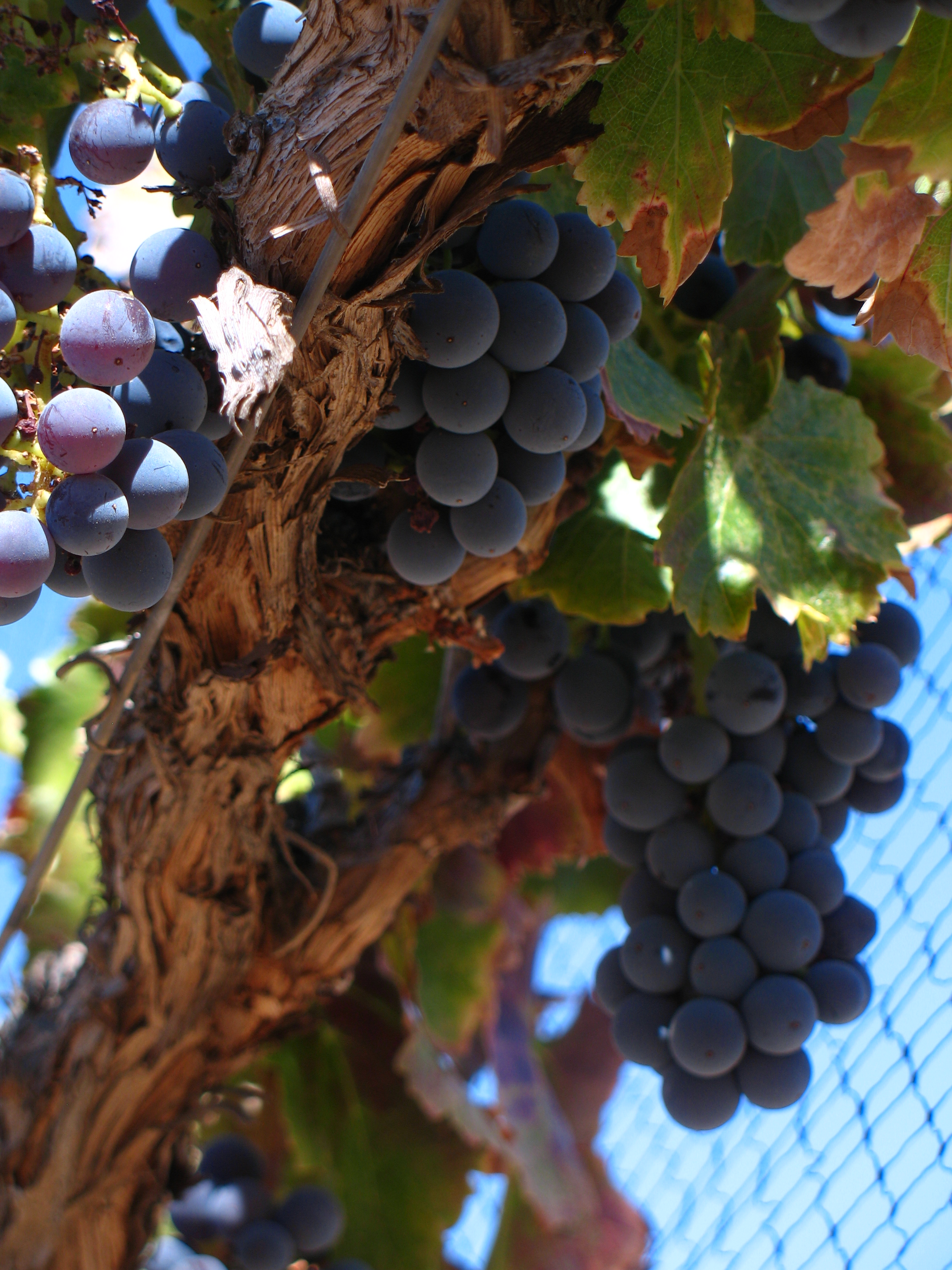
The strong wood canopy of Grenache allows it to thrive in a windy climate but also makes mechanical harvesting and pruning difficult.

The Grenache vine is characterized by its strong wood canopy and upright growth. It has good wind tolerance (which is useful with the northerly Cierzo and Mistral winds that influence the regions of Aragon and the Rhone) and has shown itself to be very suited for the dry, warm windy climate around the Mediterranean. The vine buds early and requires a long growing season in order to fully ripen. Grenache is often one of the last grapes to be harvested, often ripening weeks after Cabernet Sauvignon. The long ripening process allows the sugars in the grape to reach high levels, making Grenache-based wines capable of substantial alcohol levels, often at least 15% ABV. While the vine is generally vigorous, it is susceptible to various grape diseases that can affect the yield and quality of the grape production such as coulure, bunch rot and downy mildew due to the vine's tight grape clusters. Marginal and wet climates can increase Grenache's propensity to develop these viticultural dangers. The vine's drought resistance is dependent on the type of rootstock it is planted on but on all types of rootstocks, Grenache seems to respond favorably to some degree of moisture stress.

Grenache prefers hot, dry soils that are well drained but it is relatively adaptable to all vineyard soil types. In southern France, Grenache thrives on schist and granite soils and has responded well to the stony soil of Châteauneuf-du-Pape with the area's galets roulés, heat-retentive stones. In Priorat, the crumbly schist soil of the region retains enough water to allow producers to avoid irrigation in the dry wine region. Vineyards with an overabundance of irrigation tend to produce pale colored wines with diluted flavors and excessive alcohol. Older vines with low yields can increase the concentration of phenolic compounds and produce darker, more tannic wines such as those found in the Priorat region of Spain where yields are often around 5-6 hectoliters/hectare (less than half a ton per acre). Yield control is intimately connected with the resulting quality of wine with yields below 35 hl/ha (2 tons/acre), such as those practiced by many Châteauneuf-du-Pape estates, producing very different wines to those with yields closer to 50 hl/ha (5 tons/acre) which is the base yield for Appellation d'origine contrôlée (AOC) wines labeled under the Côtes du Rhône designation. The strong wood canopy of Grenache makes the vine difficult to harvest with mechanical harvesters and pruning equipment, and more labor-intensive to cultivate. In highly mechanized wine regions, such as Australia and California, this has contributed to a decline in the vine's popularity.

=== Mutants and crosses ===
Over centuries, the Grenache vine has produced color mutation vines with berries of all range of colors. While Grenache noir or "red" Grenache is the most well known, Grenache blanc or "white" Grenache is a very important grape variety in France where it is the fourth most widely planted white variety after Ugni blanc, Chardonnay and Semillon. Like Grenache noir, it is a permitted variety in the blends of Châteauneuf-du-Pape. In Southern France and Sardinia, the mutants Grenache Rose and Grenache gris are also found making pale rosé and lightly tinted white wines. "Hairy Grenache" (Garnacha Peluda as known in Spain, and Garnatxa Peluda in Catalan) is a Grenache variant evolved to grow fuzz on the underside of its leaves to protect the vine from transpiration in hot climates, "like the corresponding fuzz on rosemary or other mediterranean plants." Compared to its more widely planted cousin, it produces wines lower in alcohol and higher in acidity that show spicy and savory notes more readily as they age. It was not widely replanted after phylloxera as it was not well-adapted to making the vins doux naturels (see Fortified wine) that were "all the rage" at the time. The vine known as Garnacha Tintorera is a synonym for the teinturier grape Alicante which is a crossing of Grenache and Petite Bouschet. In 1961, a cross between Grenache and Cabernet Sauvignon produced the French wine grape Marselan.

== Winemaking ==
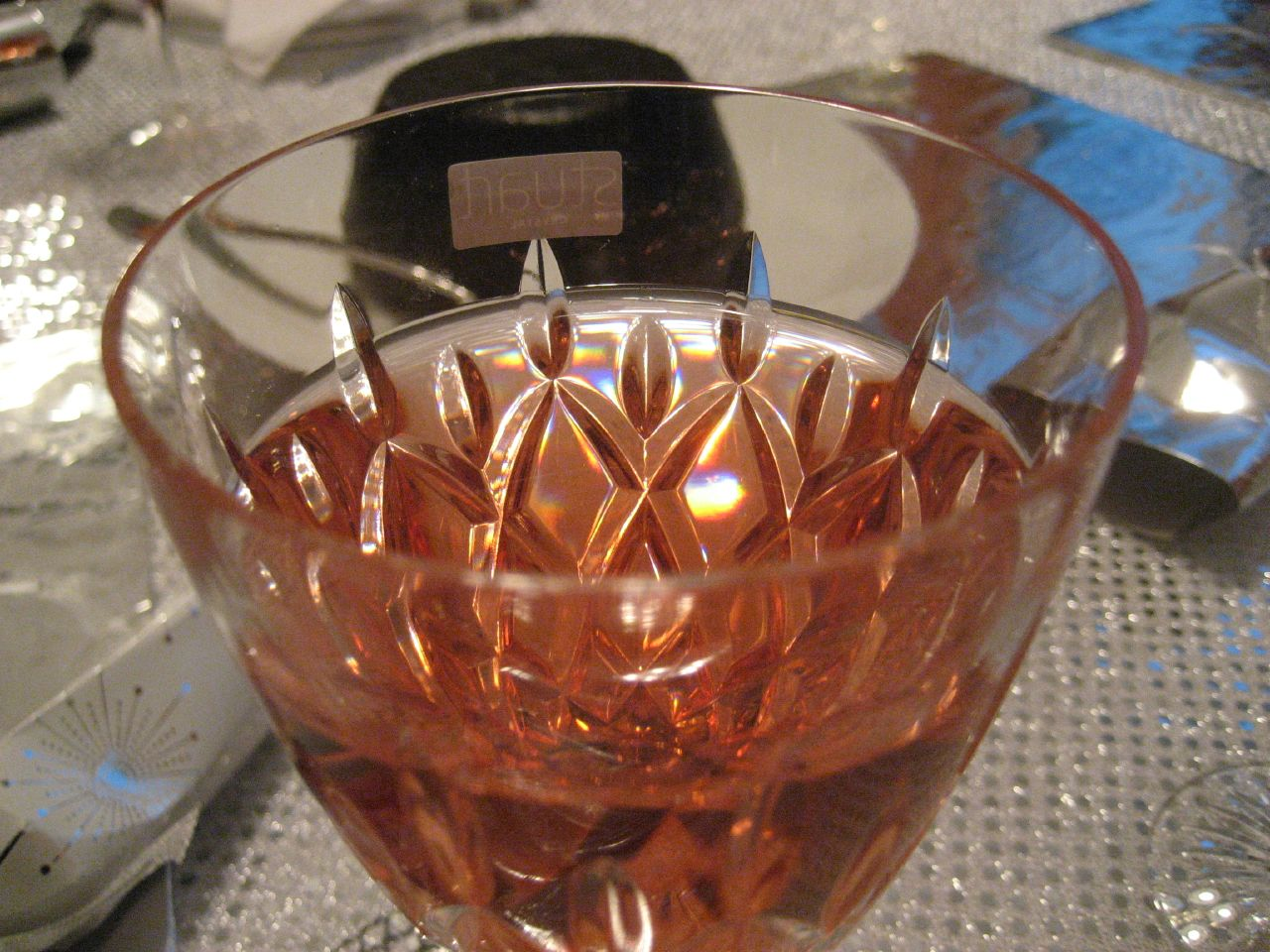
The thin skin and lack of coloring phenolic compounds makes Grenache a useful variety for the production of pale rosé

Grenache is often used as a blending component, adding body and sweet fruitiness to a wine. The grape can be troublesome for the winemaker due to tendency to oxidize easily and lose color. To compensate for the grape's naturally low tannins and phenolic compounds, some producers will use excessively harsh pressing and hot fermentation with stems to extract the maximal amount of color and phenols from the skins. This can backfire to produce green, herbaceous flavors and coarse, astringent wine lacking the grape's characteristic vibrant fruitiness. To maintain those character traits, Grenache responds best to a long, slow fermentation at cooler temperatures followed by a maceration period. To curb against oxidation, the wine should be racked as little as possible. The use of new oak barrels can help with retaining color and preventing oxidation but too much oak influence can cover up the fruitiness of Grenache.

The high levels of sugars and lack of harsh tannins, makes Grenache well adapted to the production of fortified wines, such as the vin doux naturels (VDN) of the Roussillon region (e.g. Rivesaltes, Banyuls, and Maury) and the "port-style" wines of Australia. In these wines, the must ferments for three days before grape spirit is added to the must to halt the fermentation and the conversion of sugar into alcohol. The high alcoholic proof grape spirit brings the finished wine up to 15–16% alcohol. These wines can be made in a rancio style by being left outside in glass demi-johns (or carboys) or wooden barrels where the wine bakes in the sun for several years until it develops a maderized character and flavors of sour raisins, nuts and cheese. These fortified VDNs and port-style wines have longevity and can be drinkable well into their third decade.

== Wine regions ==
Grenache is one of the most widely planted red wine grape varieties in the world with France and Spain being its largest principal wine regions. In the late 20th century, total acreage of Grenache in Spain has been on the decline with the vineyards being uprooted in lieu of the more fashionable Tempranillo, Cabernet Sauvignon and Merlot. Between the late 1980s and 2004, Spanish plantings dropped from 420,000 acres (170,000 ha) to 203,370 acres (82,300 ha) allowing France with its 236,500 acres (95,700 ha) to assume the mantle as the world's largest source of Grenache. As of 2000, Grenache was the third most widely planted red wine grape variety in France, behind Merlot and Carignan. From French nurseries, Grenache has become the fourth most widely propagated vine with more than 23 million cuttings sold since 1998 according to French ampelographer Pierre Galet.

=== France ===
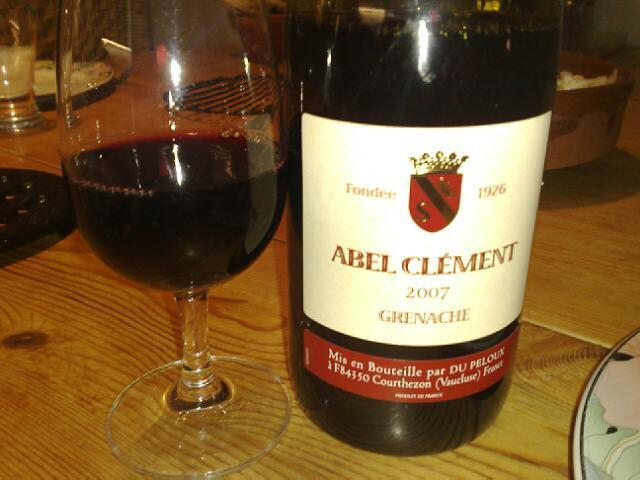
While most French Grenaches are blends, varietal examples are also produced.

In France, Grenache is most widely associated with the wines of the Rhône and southern France. Its history in the Rhône can be traced to the influence of Burgundian wine merchants in the 17-18th centuries who sought a blending variety to add body and alcohol content to their light body wines. Grenache, with its propensity for high alcohol and high yields, fit those desires nicely and was widely planted in the Châteauneuf-du-Pape and Gigondas and Vacqueyras regions. Today Grenache is most widely planted in the Languedoc-Roussillon region, widely blended with Carignan, Cinsaut, Syrah and Mourvèdre. The vine also has sizable plantings in the Drôme department. The vine's strong, hard wood and affinity for bush vine training allows it to thrive in the Mistral influenced southern Rhone regions of Châteauneuf-du-Pape and Gigondas. In Châteauneuf-du-Pape, Grenache noir is the most common variety of the 13 permitted varieties, although some producers in recent years have been using a higher proportion of Mourvèdre. Grenache produces a sweet juice that can have almost a jam-like consistency when very ripe. Syrah is typically blended to provide color and spice, while Mourvèdre can add elegance and structure to the wine.

The grape's thin skin and pale coloring makes it well-suited for the production of full bodied, fruit rosé wines. Grenache is the principal grape behind the rosés of Tavel and Lirac and plays an important role in the Provence region as well. In the Roussillon region, Grenache noir and its gris and blanc mutations are used in the production of the fortified vin doux naturels of Rivesaltes, Banyuls, and Maury. The characteristic of French Grenache-based wines depends largely on the selection of its blending partners and can range from the spicy richness associated with Châteauneuf-du-Pape to the chewy fruitiness associated with basic Côtes du Rhône Villages. Other regions with sizable plantings of Grenache include the Appellation d'origine contrôlée (AOC) regions of Minervois, Fitou and Corbières.

=== Spain ===
In Spain, Grenache is known as Garnacha (Garnatxa in Basque and Catalan) and given the likely history of the grape this is most likely the grape's original name (although the RAE gives Italian vernaccia as the etymology). There are several clonal varieties of Garnacha with the thin-skinned, dark colored Garnacha Tinta (sometimes spelled Tinto) being the most common. Another variety, known as Garnacha Peluda or "Hairy Grenache" due to the soft hairy texture on the underside of the vine's leaves is also found in Spain, mostly in Borja and Cariñena (Aragón). Compared to its more widely planted cousin, it produces wines lower in alcohol and higher in acidity that show spicy and savory notes more readily as they age. Widely planted in northeastern and central Spain, Garnacha was long considered a "workhorse" grape of low quality suitable for blending. In the late 20th century, the success of the Garnacha-based wines from Priorat in Catalonia (as well as the emerging international attention given to the New World Rhone Rangers) sparked a re-evaluation of this "workhorse" variety. Today it is the third most widely planted red grape variety in Spain (behind Tempranillo and Bobal) with more than 57,907 hectares (143,091 acres) and is seen in both varietal wines and blends.

Garnacha plays a major role in the denominación de origen protegida (DOP) wines in Aragon, Catalonia, and Navarre and the denominación de origen calificada (DOC/DOQ) wines of Rioja and Priorat, plus the mountainous areas just southwest of Madrid: Méntrida and Cebreros. Other Spanish wine regions with sizable Garnacha plantings include Costers del Segre, Empordà, La Mancha, Madrid, Penedès, Somontano, Tarragona and Terra Alta.

==== Aragon ====
Aragon, believed to be the probable origin of the grape, concentrates the largest surface of Grenache (or Garnacha as it is called locally) in Spain, with 40,034 acres (16,201 ha) planted. Garnacha is the dominant variety in the region and is typically used to produce single variety wines. Even though in the mid-20th century Garnacha was considered a "workhorse" variety for large volume wines, in the last 20 years a new generation of winemakers have taken a new approach, by controlling yields, taking advantage of the old vines (from 30 to more than 100 years), and applying modern techniques in combination with old traditions to increase concentration. The DOP of Calatayud (91% of its production is Grenache) holds the highest altitude Garnacha vineyards and is the only DOP to legally define "old vines" (35 years minimum). In the Campo de Borja DOP, 30+-years-old Garnacha bush trained vines and manual harvest are common; the grapes are typically slightly raisined, jammy fruit that generates alcohol of 14-14.5%. The Cariñena DOP has the largest surface of Garnacha vineyards in the region with 11,120 acres (4,500 ha), many of them old vines. Although many of Somontano DOP wines are now produced with international grape varieties, some of the oldest high altitude vineyards are still traditional Garnacha.

==== Rioja ====
In Rioja the grape is planted mostly in the warmer Rioja Baja region located in the eastern expanse of the wine region. Usually blended with Tempranillo, Garnacha provides juicy fruitiness and added body. In recent years, modern Rioja producers have been increasing the amount of Garnacha used in the blend in order to produce earlier maturing and more approachable Riojas in their youth. Garnacha is also used in the pale colored rosados of Rioja. The vine has a long history in the Navarre region where it has been the dominant red grape variety with nearly 54% of the region's vineyard planted with Garnacha.

==== Navarre ====
Compared to neighboring Rioja, the Garnacha-based blends of Navarre are lighter and fruitier, meant for earlier consumption.

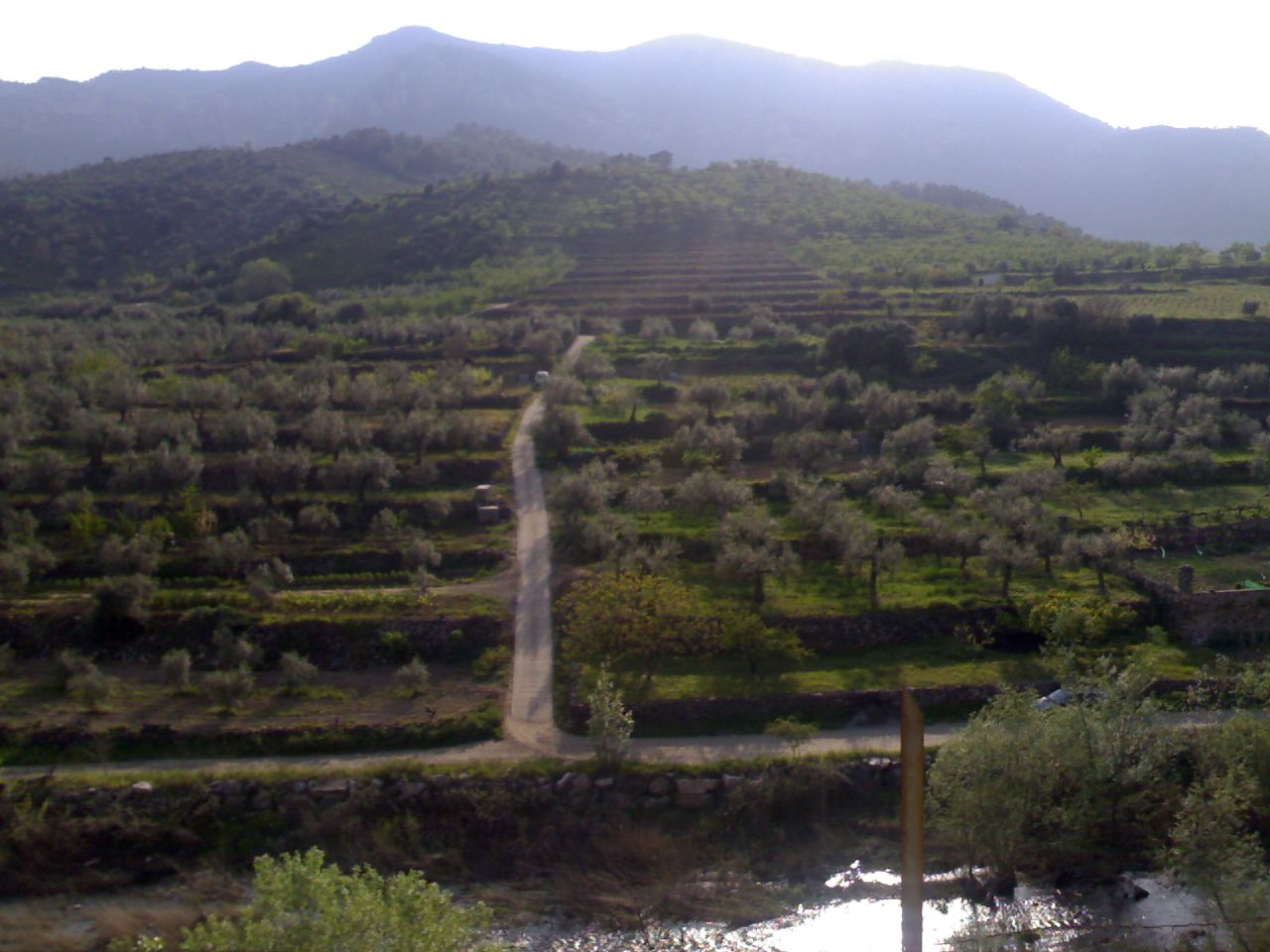
The steep terraced hillside vineyards of Priorat are planted to nearly 40% Garnacha.

==== Priorat ====
Ampelographers believe Garnacha has had a presence in the Priorat region of Catalonia for several hundred years (possibly nearly 800 years) but since the 1990s the region's old Garnacha have garnered much attention. A wave of ambitious young winemakers rediscovered the low-yield, bush-vine trained Garnacha planted throughout the llicorella (brown schist) based soils of Priorat. This unique combination of extremely old vines (the average age in most vineyards is between 35 and 60 years) planted on steep terraces and soil produces very low yields (around 5-6 hectoliters per hectare) which makes Priorat a dense, rich concentrated and dark colored wine with noticeable tannins. The traditional Priorat wine would be almost black in color and require years of aging before it would be approachable to drink. Nearly 40% of all the vineyard land in the Priorat region is planted to Garnacha, and most of the rest is Carignan but the acreage of Cabernet Sauvignon, Syrah and Merlot increased before 2000 as modernist producers sought to blend those varieties to add complexity. Some of these new modern style Priorats tend to show softer, blackberry fruit in their youth and over time develop notes of figs and tar.

=== Italy ===
Grenache is most commonly found as Cannonau in the island of Sardinia where it is one of the principal grapes in the isle's deeply colored, full bodied red wines that routinely maintain alcohol levels around 15%. The Sardinian D.O.C. wine Cannonau di Sardegna is by law at least 90% local Grenache (Cannonau).

Grenache is also found in the regions of Sicily, Umbria (specifically in Trasimeno lake area), Marche and Calabria. Grenache is known under various name in Italy, like Alicante, Tocai rosso, Guarnaccia, Bordò, and Vernaccia Nera.

=== Other Old World regions ===
Grenache has been grown in Israel since the 19th century and was once an important grape in the Algerian wine industry. Today there are still some producers in Morocco producing Grenache rosés. Sizable plantings of Grenache are also found in Cyprus and scattered among the Greek islands.

=== Australia ===
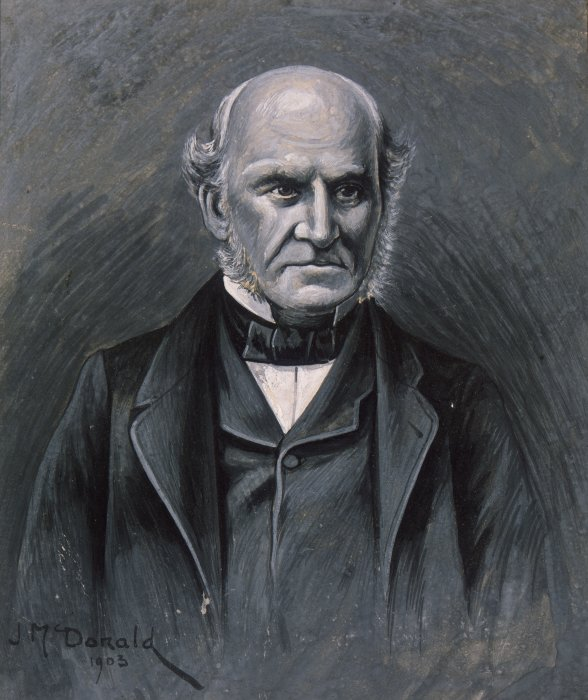
Grenache was one of many grape varieties introduced to Australia by James Busby.

A clone from Perpignan arrived in Australia with James Busby in his 1832 collection. More significant was the introduction into South Australia of new cuttings from the South of France, by Dr Christopher Rawson Penfold in 1844. Plantings in South Australia boomed, particularly in McLaren Vale, the Barossa Valley and Clare Valley. Until the mid 20th century, Grenache was Australia's most widely planted red wine grape variety with significant plantings in the vast Riverland region where it was vital component in the fortified "port-style" wines of the early Australian industry. As Australian winemakers started to focus more on premium still wines, Grenache gradually fell out of favor being supplanted by Shiraz and later Cabernet Sauvignon in Australian vineyards. The late 20th and early 21st centuries saw a revival of interest in Grenache with old vine plantings in South Australia being used to produce varietal Grenache as well as a "GSM"-Grenache, Syrah and Mouvedre-blends becoming popular. Varietal Grenache from the McLaren Vale is characterized by luscious richness and spicy notes while Barossa Valley Grenache is characterized by jammy, intense fruitiness.

=== United States ===
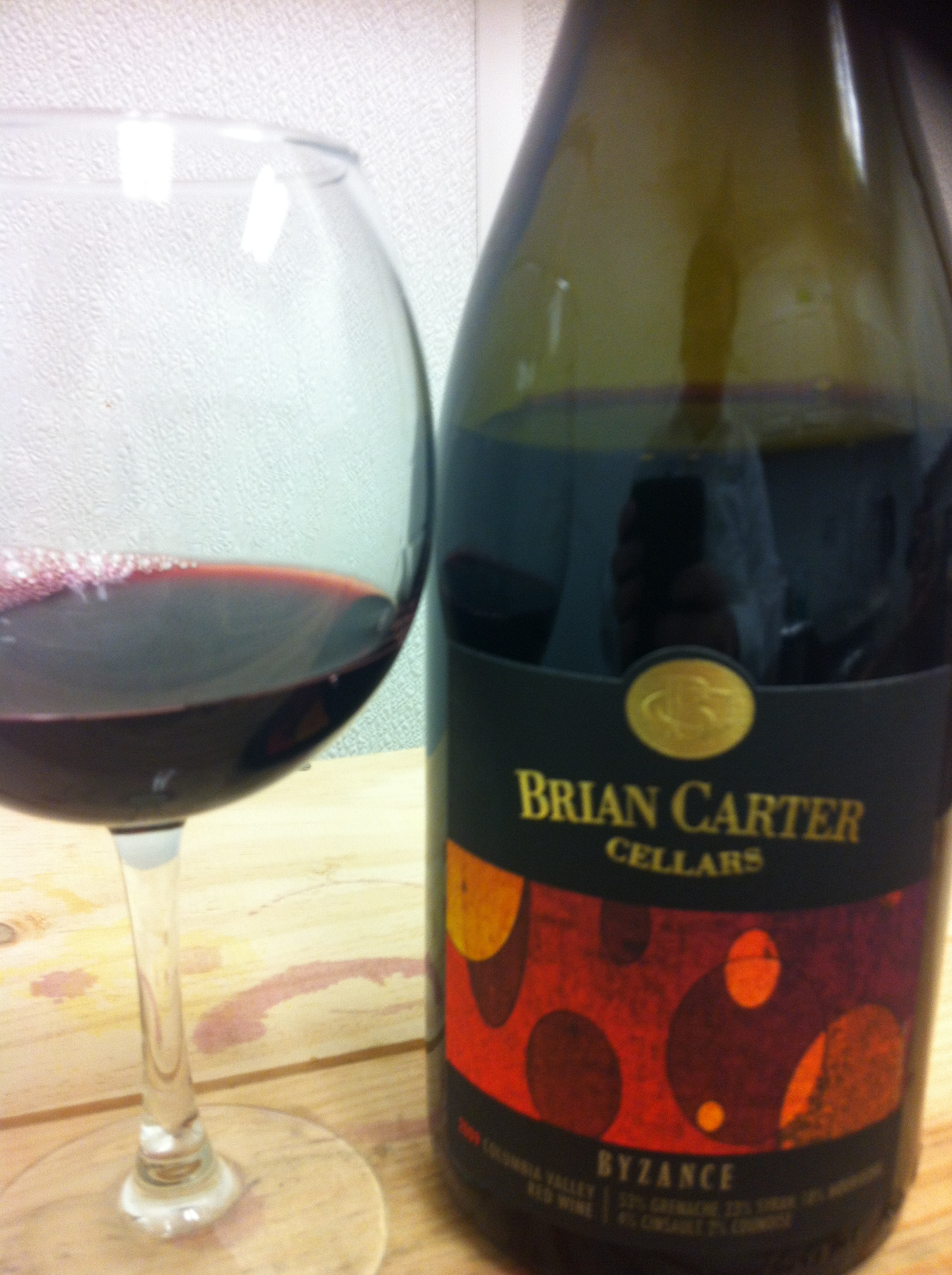
A "Rhone-style" Grenache based blend from Washington State

In the early California wine industry, Grenache's high yields and alcohol level made it an ideal blending component for jug wine production. Early plantings centered in the hot central San Joaquin Valley, where the grape benefitted from its tolerance to heat and drought. It was first used to produce sweet, pale colored "white Grenache" wines similar in quality and substance to White Zinfandel. The late 20th century saw a revival of interest in the variety spearheaded by the Rhone Rangers movement. These producers imported new cuttings from the Rhone valley for planting in the cooler Central Coast region for use in the production of premium varietal Grenache and Rhone style blends. Some historic old vine plantings of Grenache in Mendocino County has also garnered interest in recent years. In the early 20th century, Grenache was one of the first Vitis vinifera grapes to be successfully vinified during the early development of the Washington wine industry with a 1966 Yakima Valley rosé earning mention in wine historian Leon Adams's treatise The Wines of America. Despite its long history, Grenache has been a minor grape variety in Washington but has seen an increase in plantings in recent years due to the "Rhone Ranger" movement in the state. Older plantings in the Horse Heaven Hills and Columbia Gorge American Viticultural Areas (AVAs) have also begun to attract interest.

=== South Africa ===
Grenache Noir came to the Cape in the 19th century but was only confirmed as such in the early 1900s by a Stellenbosch University professor. While there isn't a lot of Grenache Noir planted in South Africa at only 305 hectares in 2014, many of the 100+ Grenache based blends are proving to be very fashionable with winemakers due to South Africa's warm climate, dry land and granitic soils.

=== Other New World wine regions ===
Despite being one of the world's most widely planted red grape varieties, Grenache's colonization of the New World has been limited apart from strongholds in Australia and California. The rising popularity and success of the Rhone Ranger's movement has brought greater attention to the variety and more plantings of Grenache are popping up every year in places like Mexico, Chile, Argentina, Uruguay and South Africa.

== Wines ==
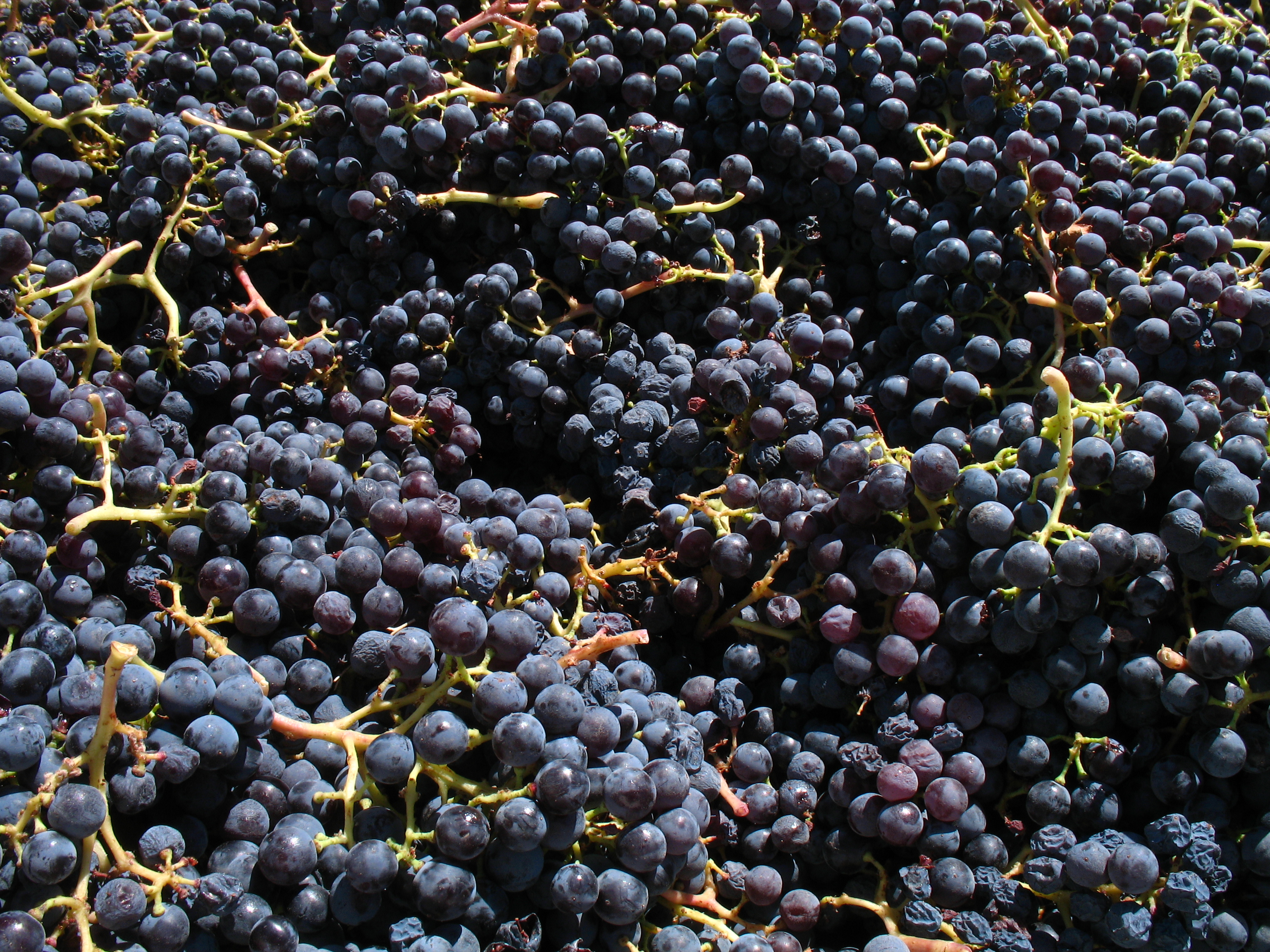
Grenache grapes

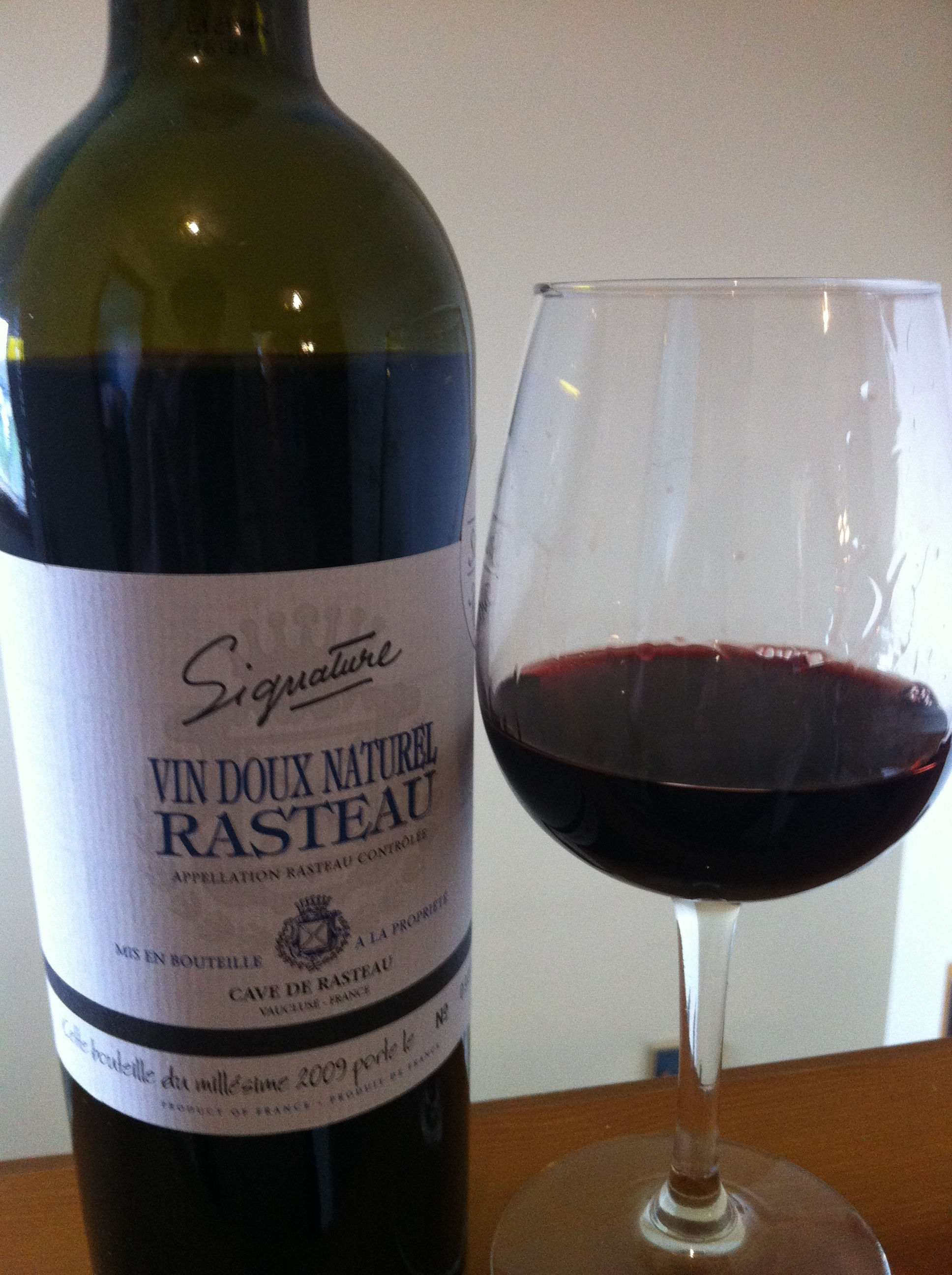
A vin doux naturel made from Grenache

Though Grenache is most often encountered in blended wines (such as the Rhone wines or GSM blends), varietal examples of Grenache do exist. As a blending component, Grenache is valued for the added body and fruitiness that it brings without added tannins. As a varietal, the grape's naturally low concentration of phenolics contribute to its pale color and lack of extract but viticultural practices and low yields can increase the concentrations of phenolic compounds. Grenache-based wines tend to be made for early consumption with its propensity for oxidation make it a poor candidate for long-term aging. However, producers (such as some examples from Châteauneuf-du-Pape and Priorat) who use low yields grown on poor soils can produce dense, concentrated wines that can benefit from cellaring. The fortified vin doux naturels of France and Australian "port-style" wines are protected from Grenache's propensity for oxidation by the fortification process and can usually be drinkable for two or three decades.

The characteristic notes of Grenache are berry fruit such as raspberries and strawberries. When yields are kept in check, Grenache-based wines can develop complex and intense notes of blackcurrants, black cherries, black olives, coffee, gingerbread, honey, leather, black pepper, tar, spices, and roasted nuts. When yields are increased, more overtly earthy and herbal notes emerge that tend to quickly fade on the palate. The very low-yielding old vines of Priorat can impart dark black fruits and notes of figs and tar with many traits similar to the Italian wine Amarone. Rosado or rosé Grenaches are often characterized by their strawberry and cream notes while fortified vin doux nautrels and Australian "port style" wines exhibits coffee and nutty tawny-like notes.

== Synonyms ==
Grenache is known under a variety of synonyms across the globe. These include: Abundante, Aleante, Aleantedi Rivalto, Aleante Poggiarelli, Alicant Blau, Alicante, Alicante Grenache, Aragones, Bois Jaune, Bordò, Cannonaddu, Cannonadu Nieddu, Cannonau, Cannonau Selvaggio, Canonazo, Carignane rosso, Elegante, Francese, Gamay del Trasimeno, Gamay Perugino, Garnaccho negro, Garnacha Comun, Garnacha negra, Garnacha Roja, Garnacha tinta, Garnatxa negra, Garnatxa Pais, Gironet, Granaccia, Granaxa, Grenache noir, Grenache rouge, Kek Grenache, Lladoner, Mencida, Navaro, Navarre, Navarre de la Dordogne, Navarro, Negru Calvese, Ranconnat, Red Grenache, Redondal, Retagliadu Nieddu, Rivesaltes, Roussillon Tinto, Roussillon, Rouvaillard, Sans Pareil, Santa Maria de Alcantara, Tentillo, Tintella, Tintilla, Tinto Menudo, Tinto Navalcarnero, Tai rosso, Toledana, Uva di Spagna, and Vernatxa.
