= Vin doux naturel =

Style of lightly fortified French wine

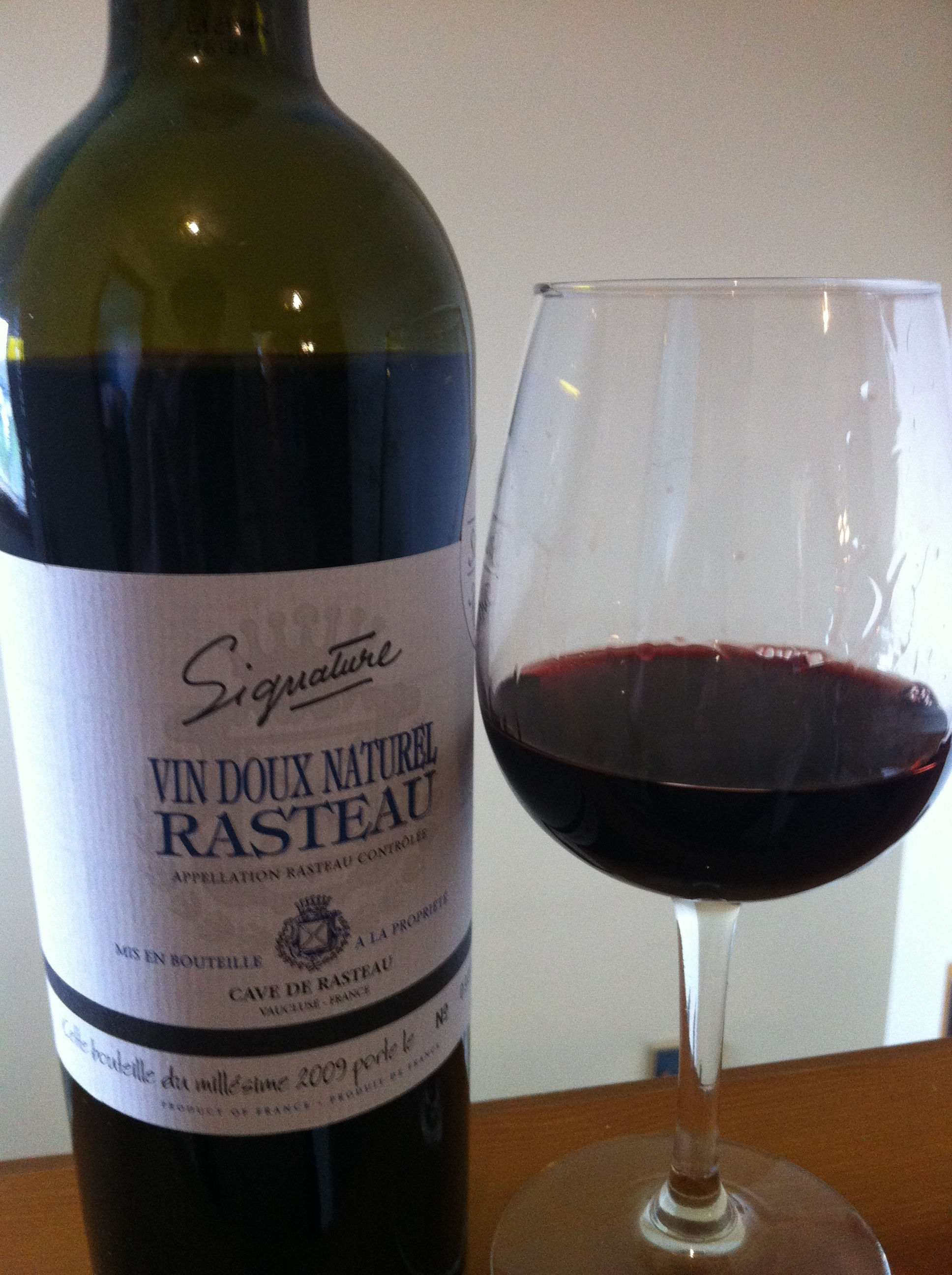
A Grenache-based Vin doux naturel from Rasteau.

Vin doux naturel (VDN, French pronunciation: [vɛ̃ du natyʁɛl]) is a style of lightly fortified wine, typically made from white Muscat grapes or red Grenache grapes in the south of France.

== Appellations ==
There are numerous appellations (Appellation d'Origine Contrôlée, AOC) for VDN, including:

Corsica:

- Muscat du Cap Corse

Languedoc:

- Muscat de Frontignan
- Muscat de Lunel
- Muscat de Mireval
- Muscat de Saint-Jean-de-Minervois

Rhône:

- Muscat de Beaumes-de-Venise
- Rasteau

Roussillon:

- Banyuls
- Maury
- Muscat de Rivesaltes
- Rivesaltes AOC

== Styles ==
As the name suggests, Muscat de Beaumes-de-Venise, Muscat de Rivesaltes and Muscat de Frontignan are all made from the white Muscat grape, whilst Banyuls and Maury are made from red Grenache. Other wines, like those of Rivesaltes AOC, can be made from red or white grapes. Regardless of the grape, fermentation is stopped by the addition of up to 10% of a 190 proof (95% abv) grape spirit. The Grenache vins doux naturels can be made in an oxidised or unoxidised style whereas the Muscat wines are protected from oxidation to retain their freshness.

Specific substyles, depending on AOC, include five colors: blanc (white), rosé (pink), ambré (amber), grenat (garnet), tuilé (tiled); and two further qualifications: hors d'âge (beyond age), and rancio (rancid, "mellowed with age").

== History ==
The production of vins doux naturels was perfected by Arnaud de Villeneuve at the University of Montpellier in the 13th century and they are now quite common in the Languedoc-Roussillon region of southern France.
