= Banyuls AOC =

Dessert wine

Coordinates: 42°28′59″N 3°07′41″E

Banyuls
- Wine region
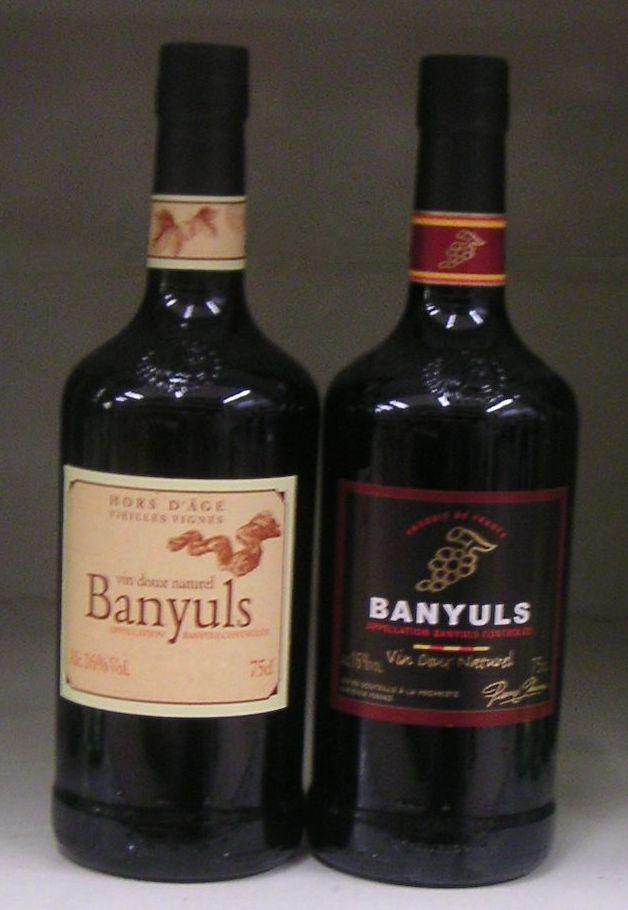
- Official name: Appellation d'origine contrôlée
- Type: AOC
- Year established: 1936 (Banyuls) and 1962 (Banyuls Grands Crus)
- Country: France
- Part of: Roussillon
- Sub-regions: Banyuls; Cerbère; Collioure; Port-Vendres
- Grapes produced: Carignan, Grenache blanc, Grenache gris, Grenache noir, Macabeu, Malvoisie and Muscat

Banyuls (French pronunciation: [baɲuls]) is a French appellation d'origine contrôlée (AOC) for a fortified apéritif or dessert wine made from old vines cultivated in terraces on the slopes of the Catalan Pyrenees in the Roussillon county of France, bordering, to the south, the Empordà wine region in Catalonia in Spain. It belongs to a category of vin doux naturel, a type of fortified wine in which fermentation is stopped by the addition of alcohol, preserving natural grape sugars. Reports have noted that demand for vin doux naturel wines has declined in recent years, contributing to lower production levels in Roussillon’s fortified-wine category which includes Banyuls.

The AOC production area is limited to four communes of the Côte Vermeille: Banyuls (from which the AOC takes its name), Cerbère, Collioure and Port-Vendres. The boundaries of the AOC are identical to those of the Collioure AOC. The name Banyuls is also protected as a wine Protected Designation of Origin (PDO) in the United Kingdom geographical indications register, with an original EU registration date of 18 September 1973.

Banyuls Grand Cru is an AOC for superior wines that would otherwise be classified as simply Banyuls. They must be matured for 30 months. The grapes permitted are the same.

== Winemaking ==
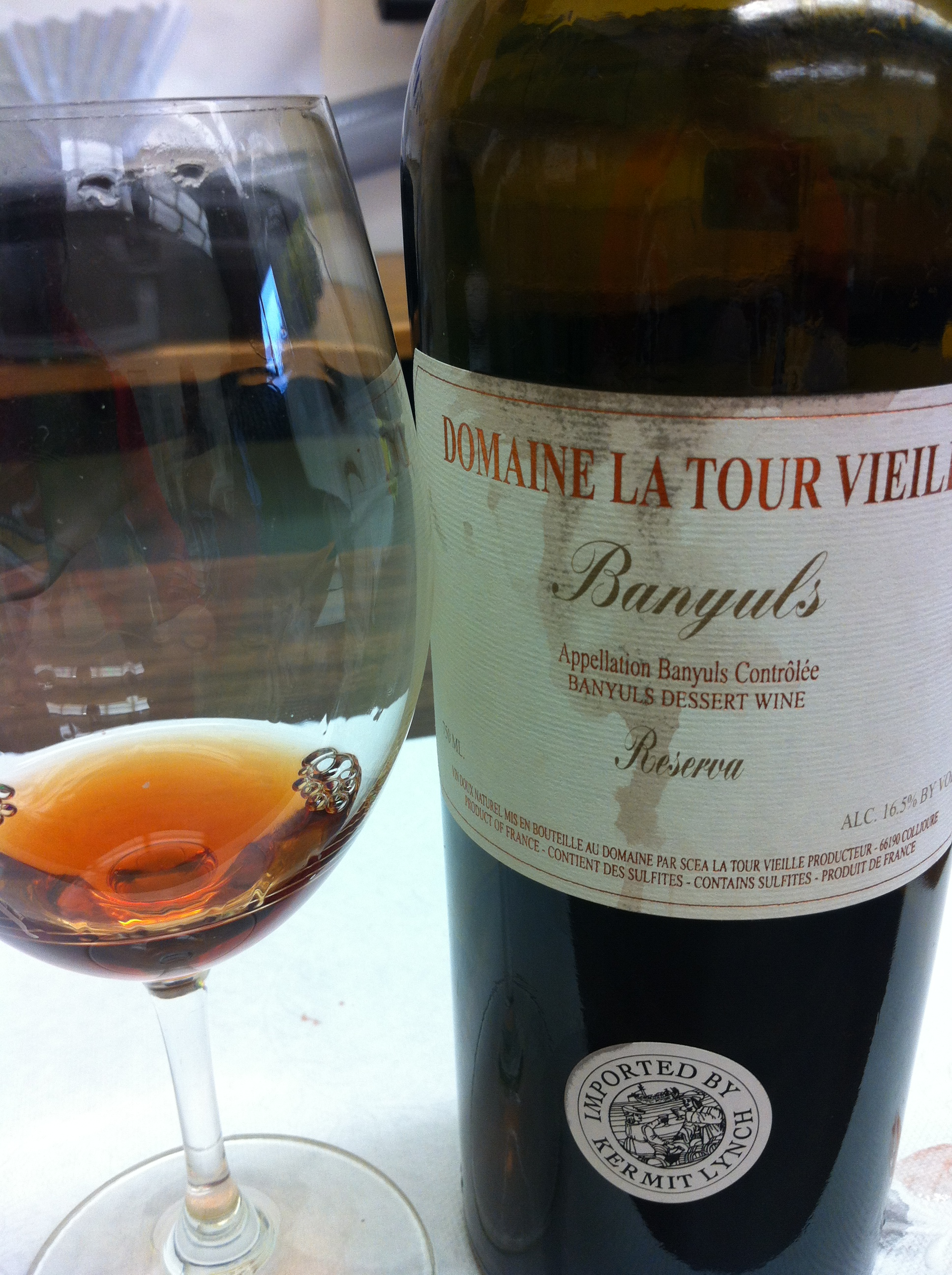
A Banyuls

The production process, known in France as mutage, is similar to that used to make Port. Alcohol is added to the must to halt fermentation while sugar levels are still high, preserving the natural sweetness of the grape. The wines are then matured in oak barrels, or outside in glass bottles exposed to the sun, allowing the wine to maderise. The maturation period is a minimum of ten months for Banyuls AOC. The resulting wine bears a similarity to port but tends to be lower in alcohol (≈16% vs. ≈20%).

== Grapes and wines ==
Most wines are red, although some white and rosé wines are produced. Permitted grape varieties are Grenache noir (at least 50%, 75% for the Grand Cru), Grenache gris, Grenache blanc and Carignan, and also (but rarely used) Macabeu, Muscat and Malvoisie.

== Producers ==
Producers of note in Banyuls making traditional Banyuls wines include Domaine de la Rectorie, Domaine Vial-Magneres, Domaine du Traginer, Domaine Madeloc, and Domaine du Mas Blanc.

== Economy ==
The Banyuls appellation forms part of the wider vin doux naturel category, which has experienced declining consumption in recent years. In 2023 economic reporting indicated structural challenges for producers in the region.Cooperative wineries were loss-making on most wines, with Banyuls Grand Cru cites as an exception but representing only a small share of production. Further reporting in January 2026 indicated financial difficulties among major producers. The GICB (Groupement Interproducteurs Collioure Banyuls), a cooperative associated with Banyuls production, was near liquidation with approximately €20 million in accumulated debt.

== See also ==
- List of Appellation d'Origine Contrôlée wines
- List of appellations in Languedoc-Roussillon
