= Maury AOC =

French wine

Coordinates: 42°48′44″N 2°35′41″E

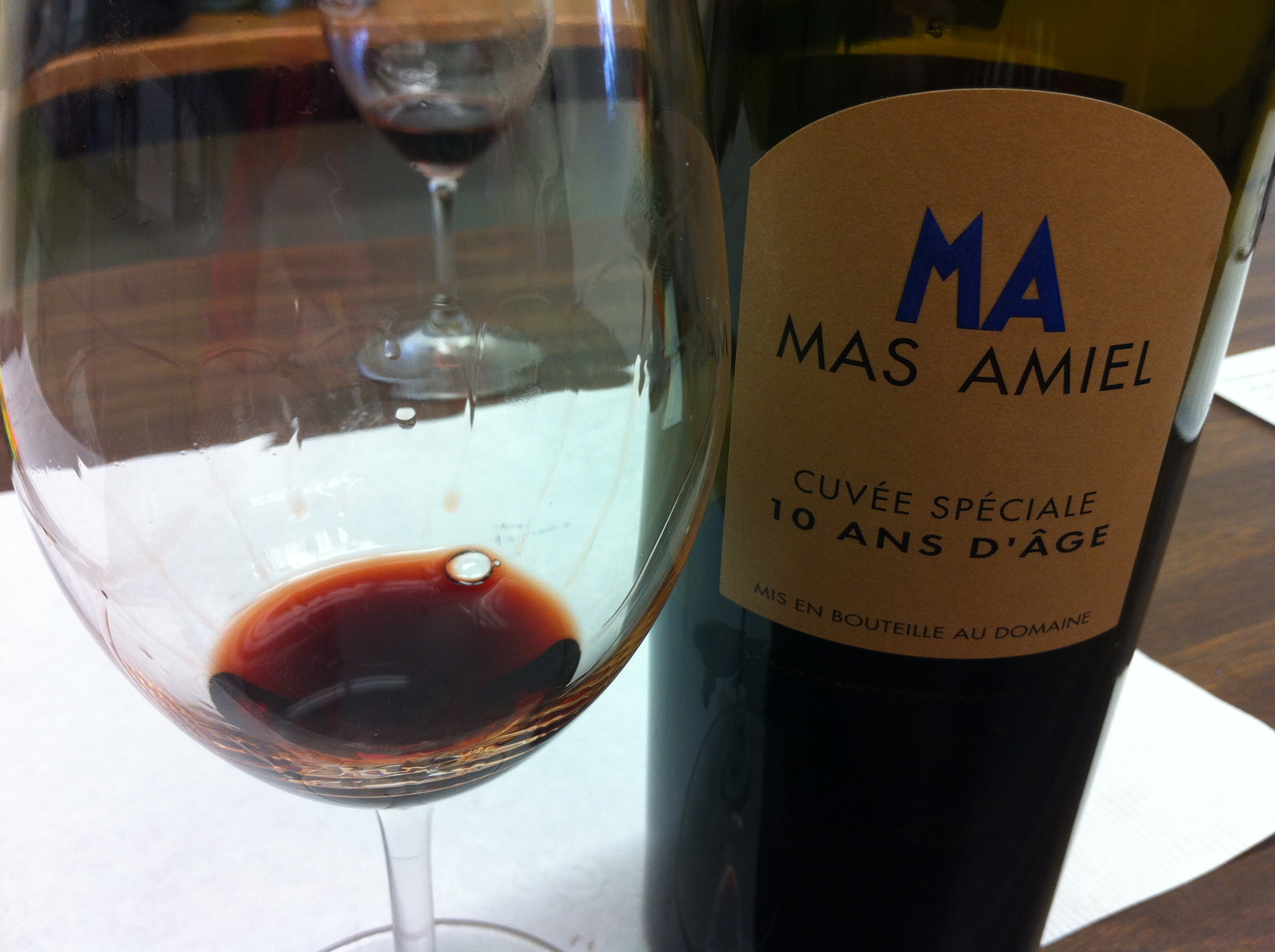
A Maury wine that has been aged for 10 years.

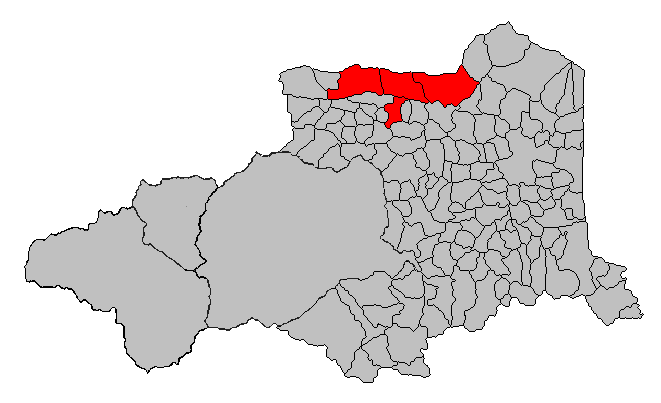
The Maury AOC within the Pyrénées-Orientales department.

Maury (French pronunciation: [moʁi]) is an Appellation d'Origine Contrôlée (AOC) for fortified vin doux naturel wines made in the Roussillon wine region of France. Almost all wines are red, made from at least 75% Grenache noir (Garnacha). Other permitted grapes are Grenache blanc, Grenache gris, Macabeu (Macabeo), Malvoisie du Roussillon (Tourbat), Syrah, Muscat and other local varieties. Although the grapes are different, they are used and marketed very much like port. It is made in the communes of Maury, Saint-Paul-de-Fenouillet, Lesquerde, Tautavel and Rasiguères. The AOC was granted in 1936.

Maury is a "vin doux naturel" style created by adding fortifying spirits, such as brandy, to the wine in mid-fermentation. This halts the activities of the wine yeast leaving the wine with "natural" residual sugars. Maury is vinified in a manner similar to port, but initial aging is often conducted in large 25 liter (6.6 US gallon/5.5 imperial gallon) glass jugs known as bonbonnes, les dames jeannes or demi-johns. The wines may also be aged in wood for up to 15 years. The resulting wines vary in depth and concentration.

In food and wine pairings, Maury is often served as an apéritif or as an accompaniment to foie gras, duck and strong blue cheeses. For dessert, aged Maury, much like Banyuls, is recognized as a suitable pairing for chocolate.

== History ==
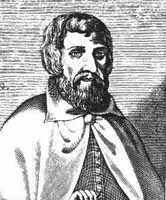
In 1299, the Catalan physician Arnaldus de Villa Nova received a patent for perfecting the technique of halting the fermentation of wine by adding grape spirits. This technique is still used today to make the wines of Maury.

Viticulture was likely first introduced to the area by the Ancient Greeks who settled the coast of southern France in 600 BC. Wines from the area were well known by the time of the Romans.

Much of Maury's history is influenced by its location as part of the Roussillon region which was part of the Kingdom of Majorca (and later Crown of Aragon) until 1642, when a revolt against the Spanish crown brought French forces into the region. The 1659 Treaty of the Pyrenees officially brought the area under the French crown. However, to this day the mix of Spanish and French influence can be seen in the winemaking style of Maury, which utilizes Spanish grape varieties such a Garnacha/Grenache as well as French Syrah.

The style of winemaking that would become associated with Maury has its roots in the work of the Catalan alchemist and physician Arnaldus de Villa Nova. He perfected the technique of stopping fermentation with distilled alcohol in the late 13th century and was given an exclusive patent on the process by King James II of Majorca. In 1872, Roussillo politician François Aragon convinced the French government to legally recognize the style of vin doux naturels as wines which had residual sugar and sweetness retained from having their fermentation stopped with grape spirits. In 1936, the Institut national de l'origine et de la qualité (INAO) established Maury as an officially recognized AOC.

== Climate and geography ==
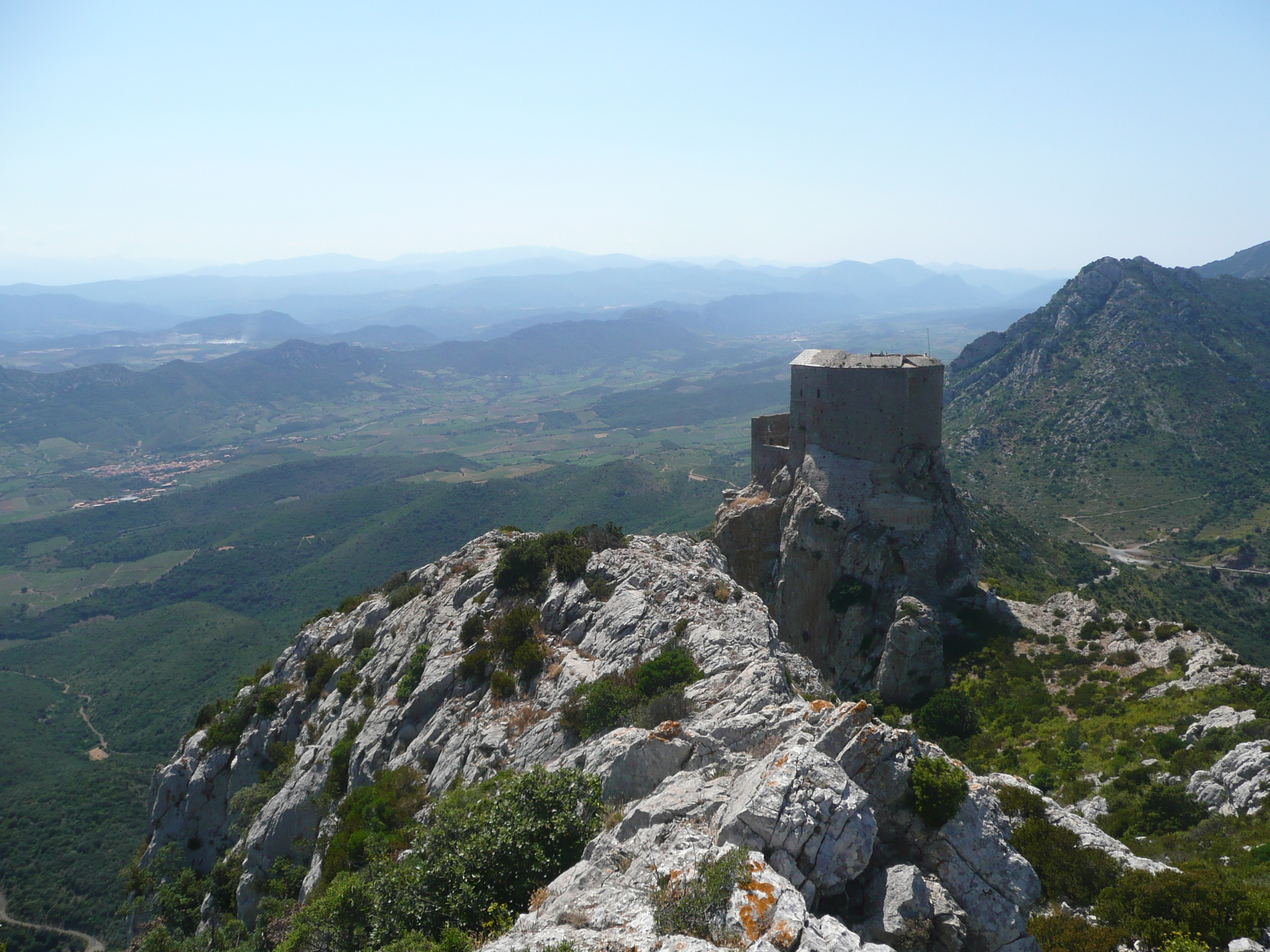
Château de Quéribus overlooking the Maury AOC.

As part of the Roussillon region the climate of Maury is warm, dry and very Mediterranean influenced. The nearby town of Perpignan is one of the sunniest places in all of France with an average annal temperature of 15 °C (59 °F). However Maury's location northwest of Perpignan, in the hilly hinterlands of the Agly valley, does temper some of the Mediterranean influence with westward winds from the Atlantic, bringing a slightly cooler influence to the valley. Similar to the Mistral influence in the Rhône, the dry northward wind Tramontane serves to cool the grapes but is much more gentle and less frequent than the powerful Mistral that can damage the vines.

In the shadow of the remains of the Cathar stronghold Château de Quéribus, the soils of Maury are a mix of schist and slate. Closer to the communes of Lesquerde the soil includes more granite, while near the town of Tautavel in the east the soil contains high portions of the argilo-calcaire vineyard soils of clay and limestone.

== Winemaking ==
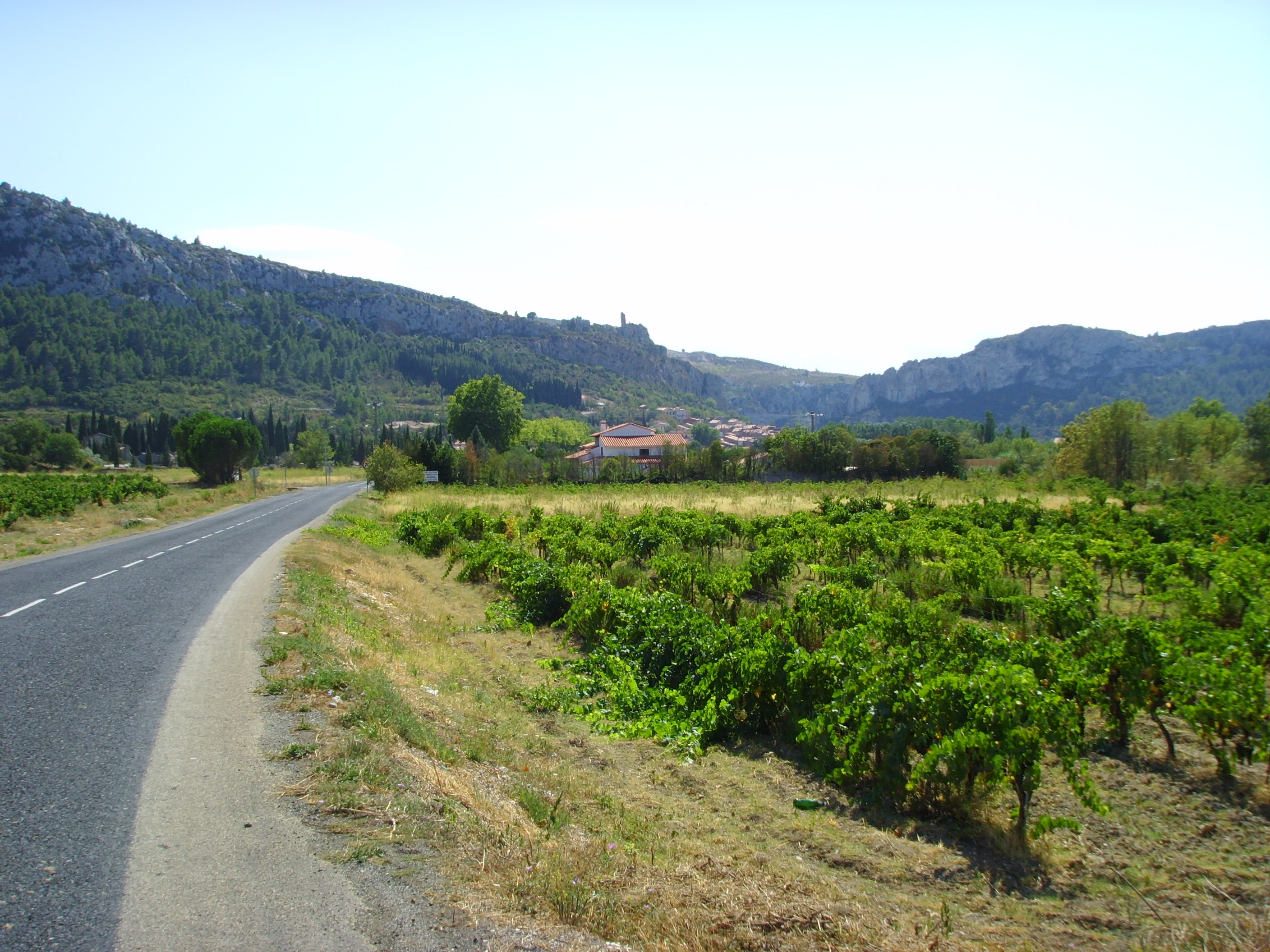
A vineyard in the commune of Tautavel that can provide grapes for Maury wine.

As a vin doux naturel (or VdN) Maury wines undergo a unique form of winemaking that shares elements with other notable fortified wines like Port, Sherry, Madeira and vin de liqueur. An English translation of the name would be "wines naturally sweet" and refers to the natural residual sugars of the grapes that are left unfermented in the wine. However these sugars are left because of the outside addition of grape spirits (or brandy) added early in the fermentation period that kills the yeast and halts the fermentation process. This process, called mutage leaves a partially fermented must (called the vin muté) with 6 to 12% alcohol from the fermentation and 5-10% alcohol by volume from the brandy. The amount of residual sugar left in the wine will vary from 50 to 125 g/L (5 to 12.5% RS).

Prior to fermentation, the grapes destined for Maury production (predominantly Grenache) are harvested very ripe usually with a potential alcohol level (based on the amount of grape sugar alone) at 14.5% (around 25 to 27°Bx or 13.8 to 15 Baumé). After crushing, the must usually undergoes a period of extended maceration that can last up to 30 days. During this time the cap of grapes skins is frequently punched down (pigeage) or the juice pulled out from under the tank and pumped over the cap to allow for a more thorough extraction of phenolics that influence tannin, colour and aroma.

Usually during this maceration, the fermentation process starts with ambient yeasts in the cellar. Often the wine will have fermented to the point where the grape spirits are added before maceration has ended and the wine is pressed off the skins, a process known as mutage sur grains. The added alcohol during maceration allows for more ethanol-soluble phenolics and flavor compounds to be extracted. After pressing, the wine is left to settle in concrete vats over the winter before it is racked into barrels or other containers.

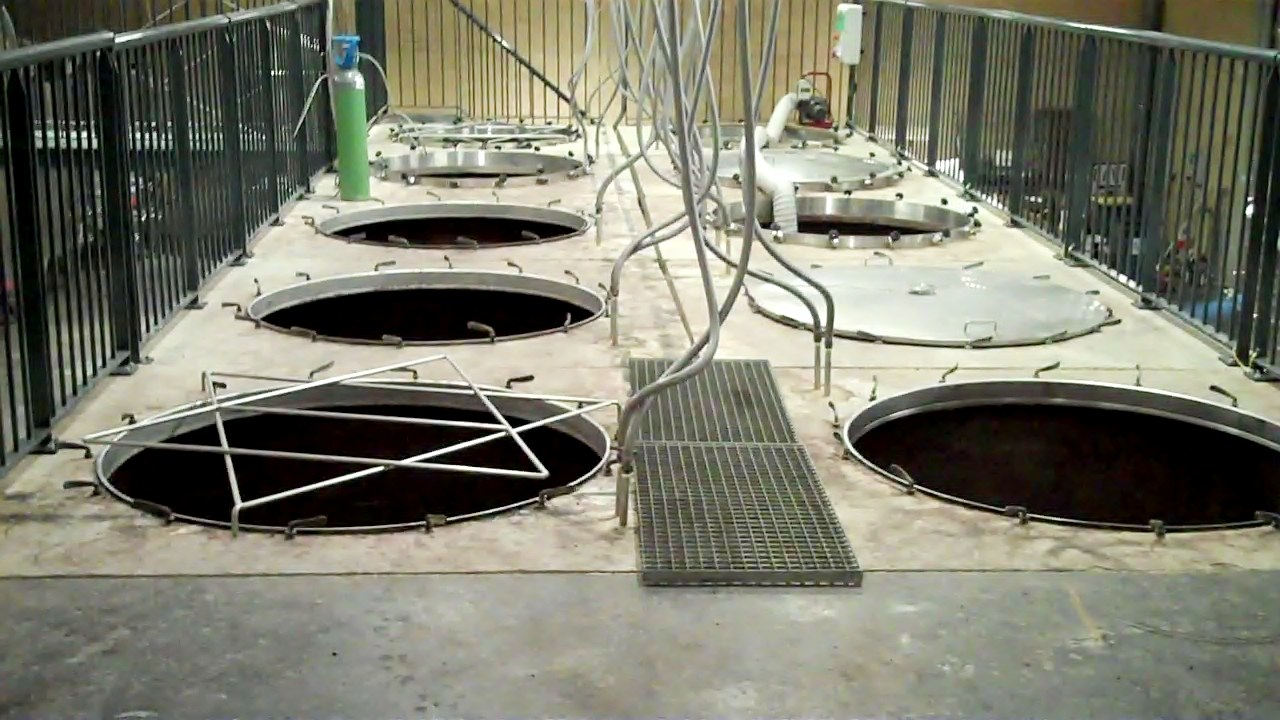
Maury wines are often fermented and settled in large concrete fermentors such as these. The large opening allows cellar works to punch down the cap during maceration.

Since the fermentation process is halted rather quickly, the flavors of Maury do retain some of the natural primary grape aromas of Grenache along with some of the early fermentation esters that develop. But most of the distinctive character of Maury come from the aging process that can take place in a wide range of containers (from concrete and oak barrels to glass bonbonnes) kept in a variety of conditions (including out in the sun for deliberate oxidation) for a number of years depending the particular house style of the winemaker.

=== Rancio ===
One style of Maury known as rancio is produced when the wine is racked into clear glass demi-johns or bonbonne and left out in the summer sun to oxidize and age. This causes many of the colour compounds and tannins in the wines to fall out, leaving a thick, dark coloured deposit in the bonbonne. This deposit is allowed to stay in the bonbonne to influence the colour and flavour of resulting vintages of wine that are aged in the container. Once the wine has finished aging for the summer it is usually blended with wine that has spent time aging in large foudres oak cask or sold separately as Maury Rancio.

=== Comparison to Port ===
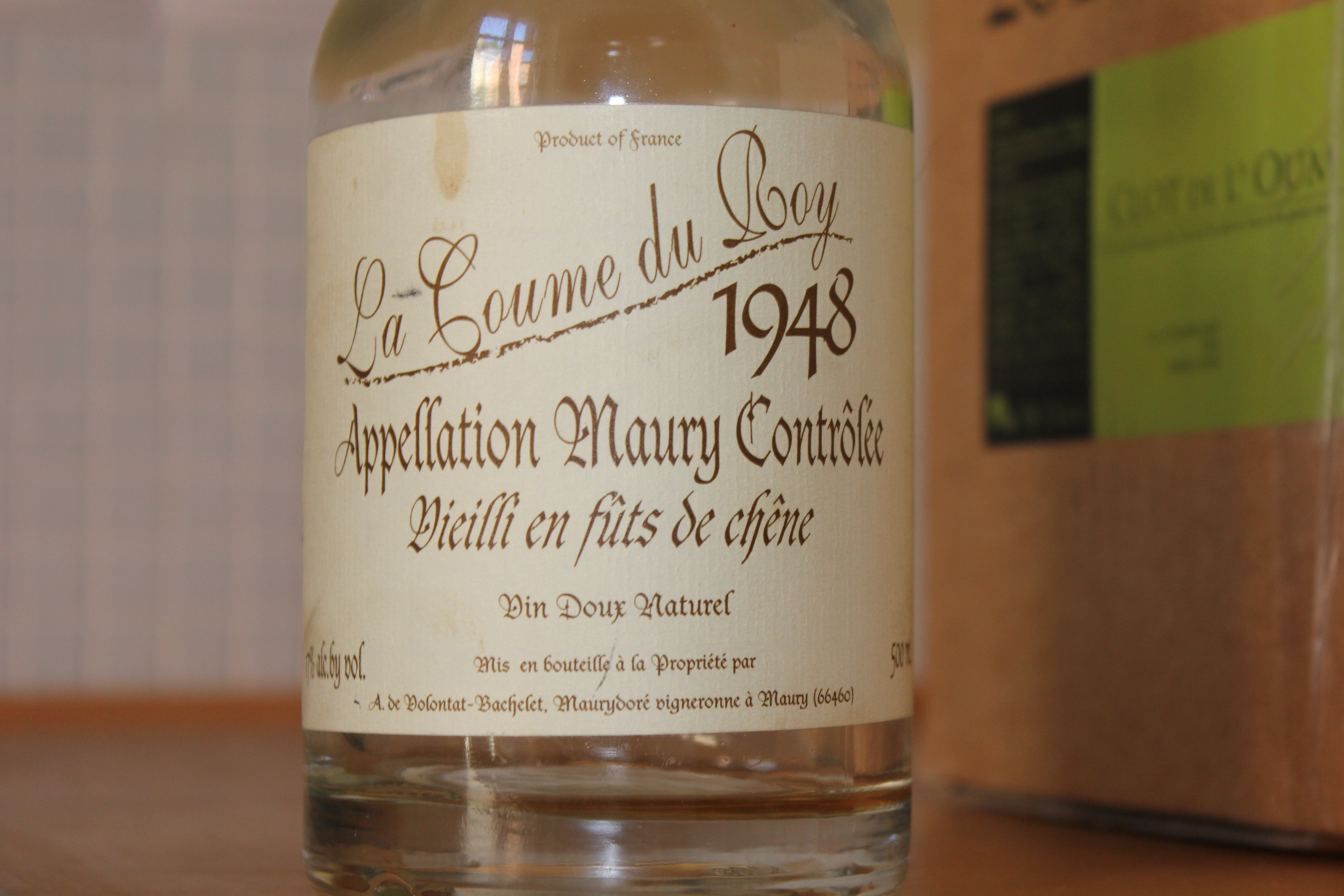
A bottle of Maury wine "vintage dated" with 1948. This date may not necessarily be the year that the grapes were harvested but rather the year that the wine was bottled.

While the Portuguese wine Port is similarly made with a mutage halting the fermentation, there are some distinct differences in how vin doux naturels like Maurys are made. For one, the fortifying spirits used in Port are of a lower alcohol strength (traditionally 77%) while those used for vin doux naturels are often 95%. The spirits are then added to the VdNs later in the fermentation process than with Port. More of the fortifying spirits are often used in Port production, representing up to a fifth (20%) of the finished volume of wine compared to the spirits accounting for around 15% of the finished volume of the VdNs. This means that most VdNs contain less water and alcohol than the typical Port wine.

=== Vintage dating ===
While vintage Maurys do exist, most wines are a blend of several vintages with some producers even utilizing a solera system of fractional blending similar to Sherry. These wines will often have an estimate age of "bottle date" listed on the wine label instead of a vintage.

Since 1975, more producers have experimented with "vintage" Maurys (called Rimage in neighboring Banyuls). These are wines that are bottled early, often without rancio or barrel aging. The wines have a very dark red color with strong cherry and ripe flavors with noticeable tannins.

== AOC regulations ==
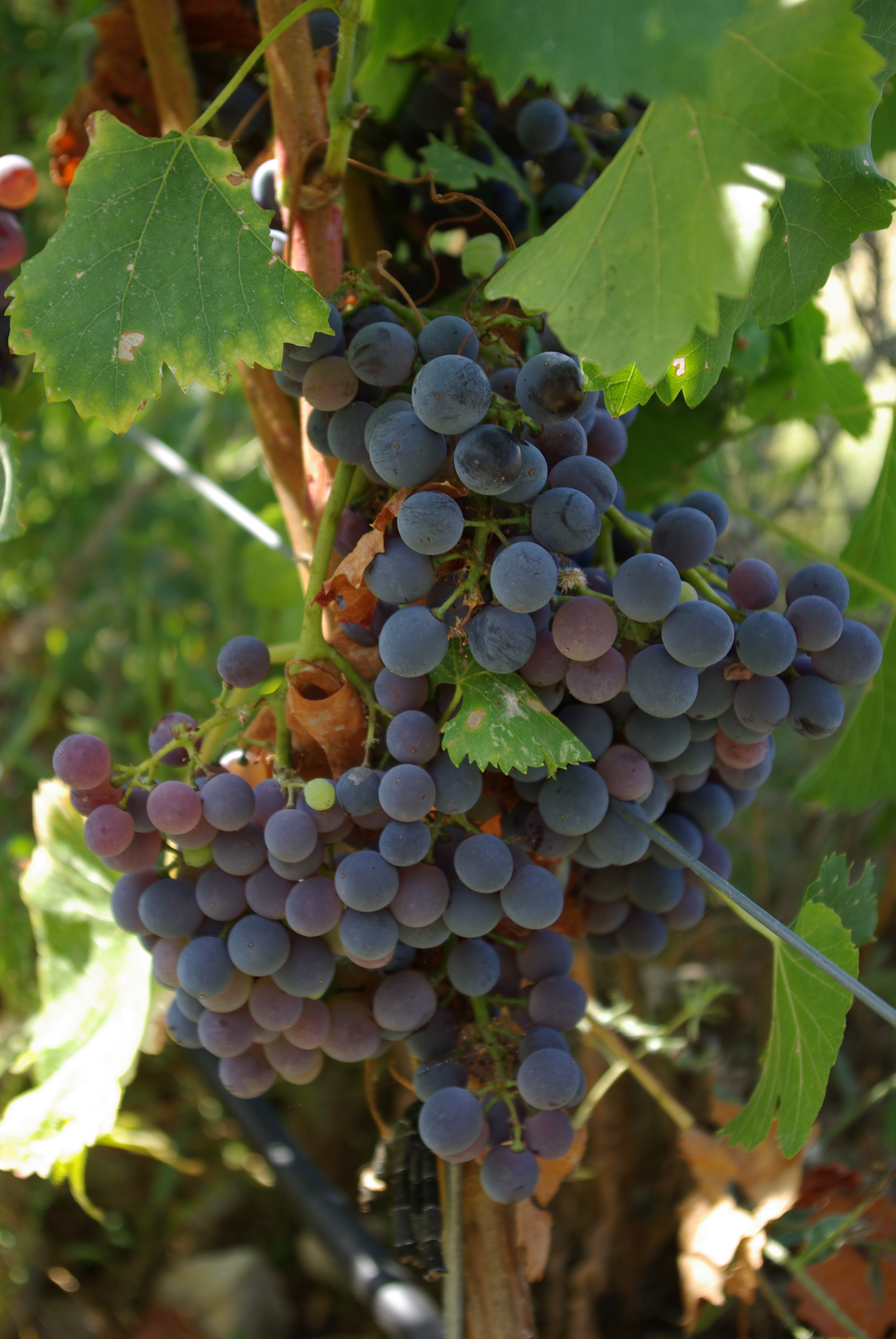
All Maury AOC wines made since 2000 must contain at least 75% Grenache.

When Maury was first granted its AOC, the minimum Grenache percentage required was only 50%, but that figure has risen steadily over the years and today Maury wines must be made from at least 75% Grenache noir with pre-2000 vintages grandfathered to require minimum of 70%. In reality, most Maury are 90-100% Grenache though other varieties are permitted to be used. These include Macabeo, which is limited to constituting no more than 10% of the blend (15% maximum for pre-2000 vintages), and Carignan, Cinsault, Listan Negra and Syrah which collectively can not make up more than 10% of the blend. Other white grape varieties beyond Macabeo are also permitted including Grenache blanc, Grenache gris, Tourbat, Muscat Blanc à Petits Grains and Muscat of Alexandria.

Grapes destined for AOC wine production in Maury are limited to a harvest yield no greater than 30 hectoliters/hectares (approximately 1.6 tons/acre). When the fortified spirits is added is not specifically regulated but the finished wine must have a minimum alcohol level of at least 15%.

Non-fortified table wines produced in the southern reaches of Maury AOC along the Agly valley have been previously eligible for the Côtes du Roussillon-Villages AOC or to be sold as a vin de pays under the Vin de Pays des Côtes Catalanes designation. For the 2011 vintage, a new AOC designation of Maury Sec was introduced to allow for dry table wines produced from the same grape varieties permitted for the vin doux naturel.

== Production and industry ==
In 1998, Maury had 1,715 hectares (4,240 acres) of planted vineyard producing 48,086 hectoliters (over 534,000 cases) of wine. By 2003, these numbers had not changed.

Like most of Roussillon, the wine industry of Maury is dominated by co-operatives with Les Vignerons du Maury making the bulk of the yearly production. In recent years, smaller estates experimenting with new winemaking and aging techniques have garnered the attentions of wine writers and critics. These include Mas Amiel and Domaine de la Préceptorie.

== Wine styles ==
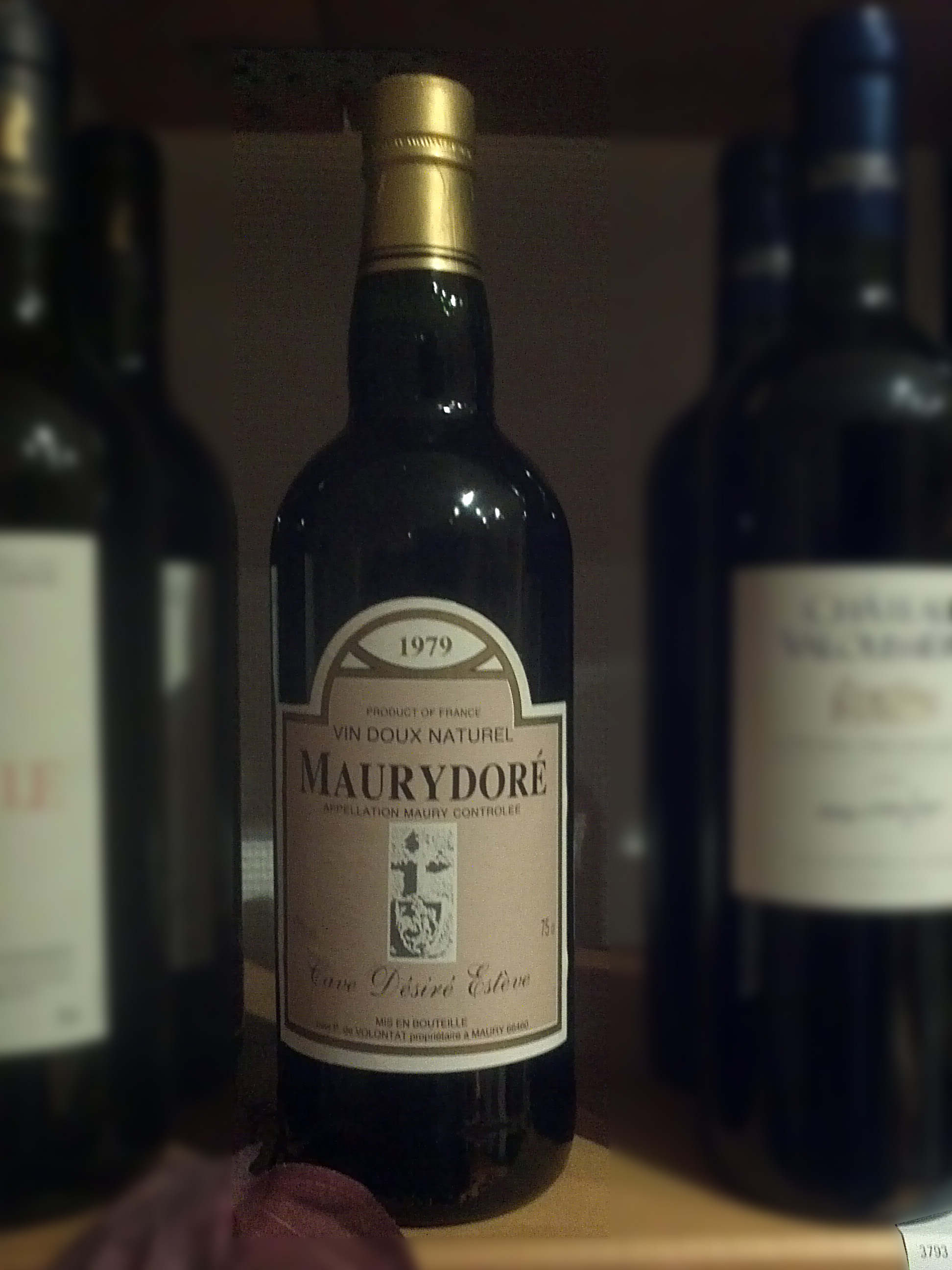
A bottle of Maury wine from the estate Maury Doré.

According to Master of Wine Jancis Robinson, the wines of Maury are often very tannic in their youth, requiring long barrel aging before they are bottled. Compared to neighboring Banyuls, the vin doux naturels of Maury are often noticeably darker in colour.

Wine writer Tom Stevenson notes that Maury wines can come in tawny and rosé styles as well as red and are often characterized by toasty, nutty flavours with raisin and tangy berry fruit.

Master of Wine Clive Coates describes the wines having rich flavours of chocolate, black cherries and mocha with a silky smooth mouthfeel. Younger examples will have a fresh raspberry flavour typical of Grenache. In regards to food and wine pairing, Coates notes that Maury are one of the rare wines that pair well with chocolate desserts.

Coates also states that similar to Banyuls, Maury wines are often ready to drink soon after they're bottled and do not benefit much from any further aging in the cellar. When opened, the high alcohol content can protect the wine from the effects of oxidation but most of the fruit flavors will leave if the wine is not consumed within a week.

Wine expert Andre Dominé notes that the flavour of Maury will depend on how long it has been aged prior to bottling with the youngest "first phase" Maury wines having candied cherries, fresh figs and stewed fruit aromas while "second phase" wines will develop more dried fruits flavours of raisins, prunes and apricots. Longer aging, seven years or more, will give the wine caramel, cocoa, tobacco and coffee notes while rancio style will have green walnut husk and aromas similar to cognacs and vin jaune wines from the Jura.
