= Muscat de Rivesaltes AOC =

Coordinates: 42°46′11″N 2°52′29″E

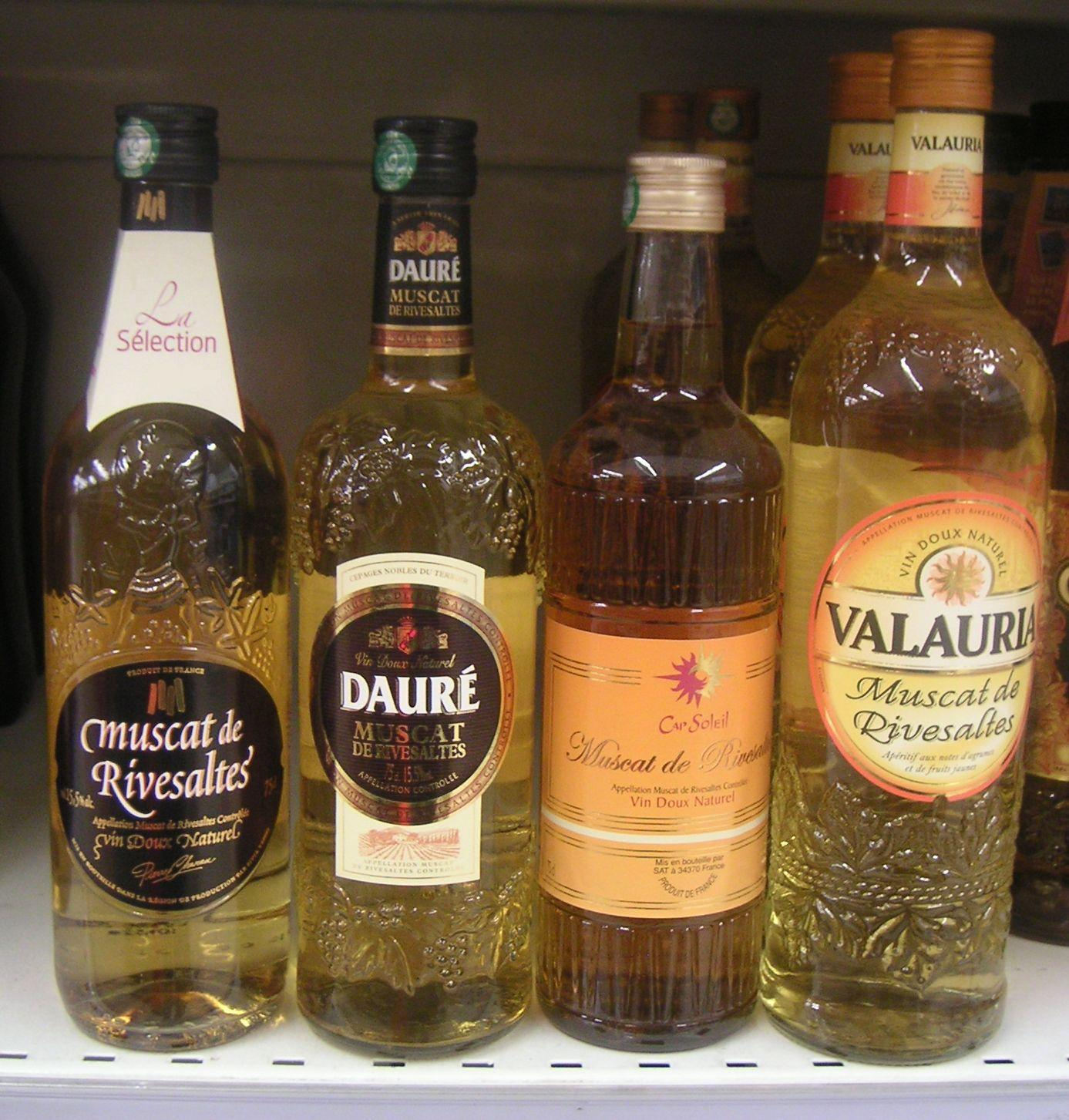
Some different bottles of muscat de Rivesaltes

Muscat de Rivesaltes (French pronunciation: [myska də ʁivzalt]; Occitan: Moscat de Ribesaltes) is an Appellation d'Origine Contrôlée (AOC) for fortified wines (of the type vin doux naturel) made in the Roussillon wine region of France. They are similar to Rivesaltes AOC wines, except for the grape varieties used. The wines are white, and made from Muscat d'Alexandrie and Muscat à Petits Grains grapes, usually in equal quantities, although the appellation rules allow these varieties to be used in any proportion. The alcohol content must be at least 15 per cent by volume, the potential alcohol content at least 21.5 per cent, and the sugar content (fermentable sugars, glucose and fructose) of the finished wine at least 100 grams per liter.

The AOC was created in 1956.

The wine is usually served as an aperitif but in Rivesaltes ville and the surrounding area is commonly drunk by the glass in bars and cafes. A popular local starter is foie gras served with a glass of Muscat de Rivesaltes.

== Muscat de Noël ==
Muscat de Noël is a designation for young Muscat de Rivesaltes marketed for the Christmas (Noël) season in its harvest year. Muscat de Rivesaltes with the additional designation Muscat de Noël can be marketed from November 1 in its harvest year, while regular Muscat de Rivesaltes can be marketed from February 1 in the year following the harvest.

== See also ==
- List of appellations in Languedoc-Roussillon
