= Maderisation =

Process that involves the heating and oxidisation of a wine

Maderisation is a process that involves the heating and oxidisation of a wine. The term is named after the process used in the production of Madeira wine, where it occurs while the wine is in cask. The resulting wine darkens in color and acquires a Sherry-like character. Apart from Madeira wine, it is generally seen as a wine fault, but is desirable in the case of certain dessert wines where it occurs over the course of long bottle aging.
