= Terret noir =

Variety of grape

- Grape (Vitis)
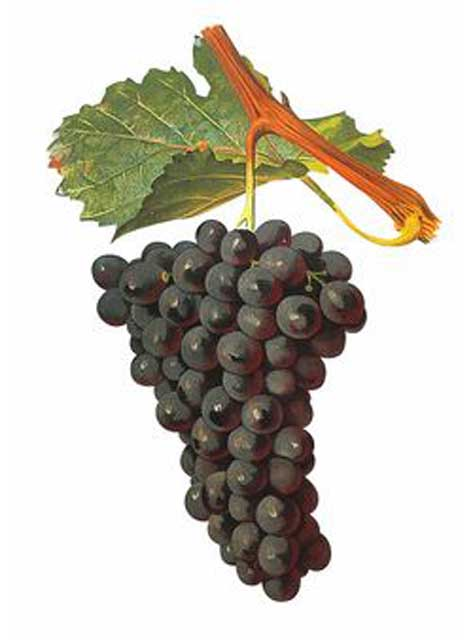
- Terret noir in Viala & Vermorel
- Color of berry skin: Noir
- Species: Vitis vinifera
- Origin: France
- Notable regions: Rhône valley
- Notable wines: Châteauneuf-du-Pape
- VIVC number: 12384

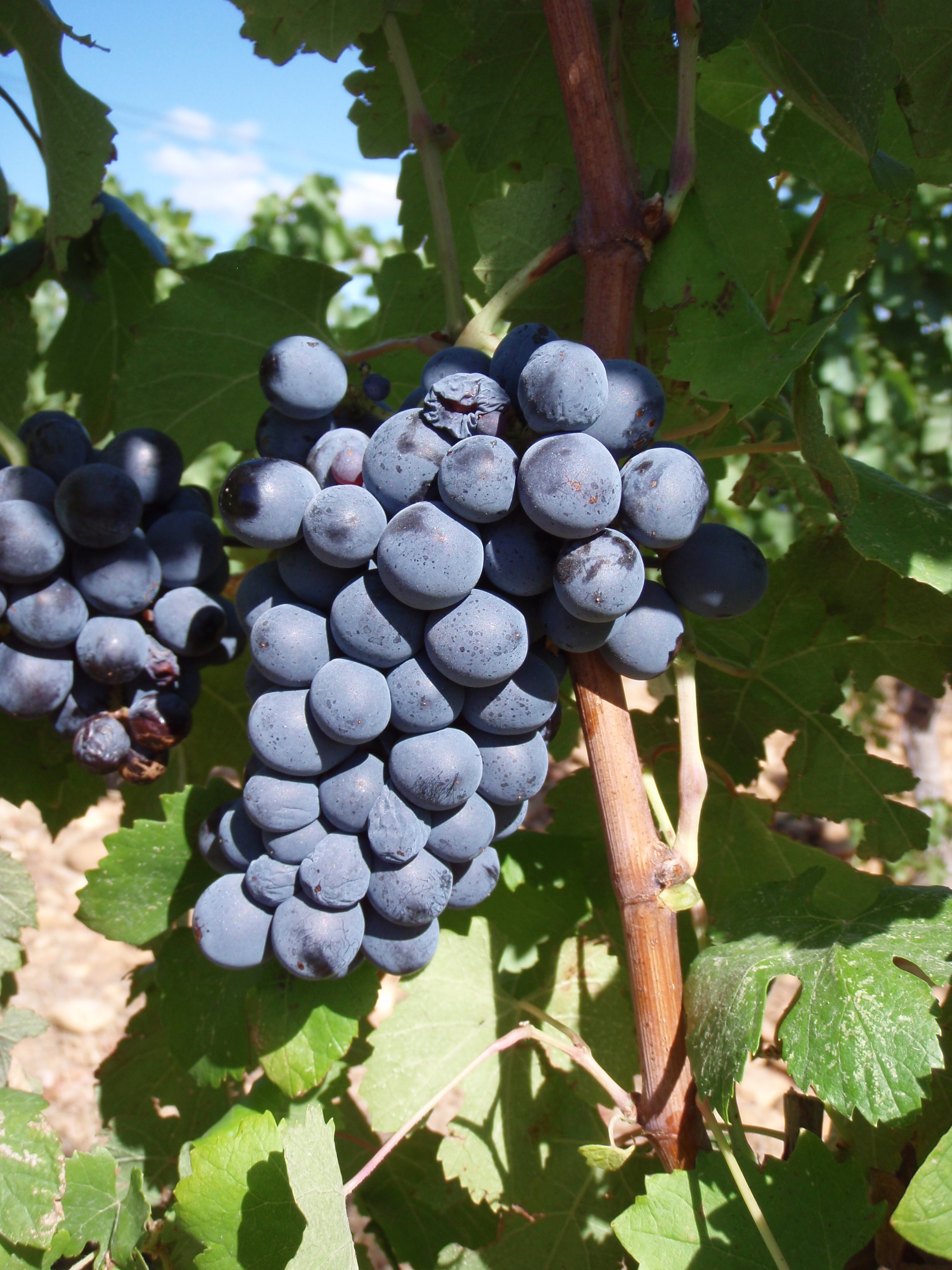
Terret Noir grapes

Terret noir is a dark-skinned French wine grape variety grown primarily in the Rhône valley region of France. It is a mutation of the old Vitis vinifera vine Terret. It is a permitted blending grape for Châteauneuf-du-Pape. Like the related Terret gris and Terret blanc, the vine tends to bud late and grow vigorously. Terret noir produces a light color wine that is perfumed and tart.

In 2007, there were 189 hectares (470 acres) of Terret noir in France. This was a steep decline from the 400 ha (1000 acres) plantings that the Institut national de l'origine et de la qualité (INAO) reported in 2000.

== Wine regions ==
Terret noir is a permitted grape variety in several Rhône, Provence and Languedoc AOCs including:

- Châteauneuf-du-Pape, no maximum or minimum usage for Terret noir though it tends to be a minor blending component far behind Grenache, Syrah, Mourvedre and Cinsault. Grapes destined for use in Châteauneuf-du-Pape must be harvested to a yield no greater than 35 hectoliters/hectare with the finished wine needing to attain a minimum alcohol level of 12.5%.
- Corbières AOC, permitted as minor blending components in both the red and rosé wines behind Carignan which must make up at least 50% of the blend. Here the grapes are often blended with Syrah, Mourvedre, Cinsault and Picpoul. Grapes destined for the AOC wine must be harvested to a yield no greater than 50 hl/ha with the finished wine needing to attaining a minimum alcohol level of 11.5%.
- Costières de Nîmes AOC, permitted to be blended in both the red and rosé wines up to a maximum of 50%. Here Terret is often blended with Grenache, Syrah, Mourvedre, Counoise, Carignan and Cinsault. Grapes destined for AOC production must be harvested to a yield no greater than 60 hl/ha with the finished wine needing to attain a minimum alcohol level of at least 11%.
- Coteaux du Languedoc, permitted as a minor blending component in the red and rosé wines behind Grenache, Mourvedre and Syrah that must make up at least 50% of the blend collectively and Carignan which can not make up no more than 50% of the remaining parts. Terret, along with Counoise, Cinsault and Lladoner Pelut are used in varying, small percentages. Grapes destined for AOC production must be harvested a yield no greater than 50 hl/ha with the finished wines needing to attain a minimum alcohol level of at least 11%. The minimum rises to 11.5% if the wine has a cru designation—meaning that it was grown in the specially recognized vineyards around Corbières, Mejanelle, St-Christol, Vérargues, Montpeyrous, Pic St-Loup, Quatourze, Saint-Drézéry, St-Georges d'Orques, St-Saturnin and the extinct volcano Montagne de la Clape.

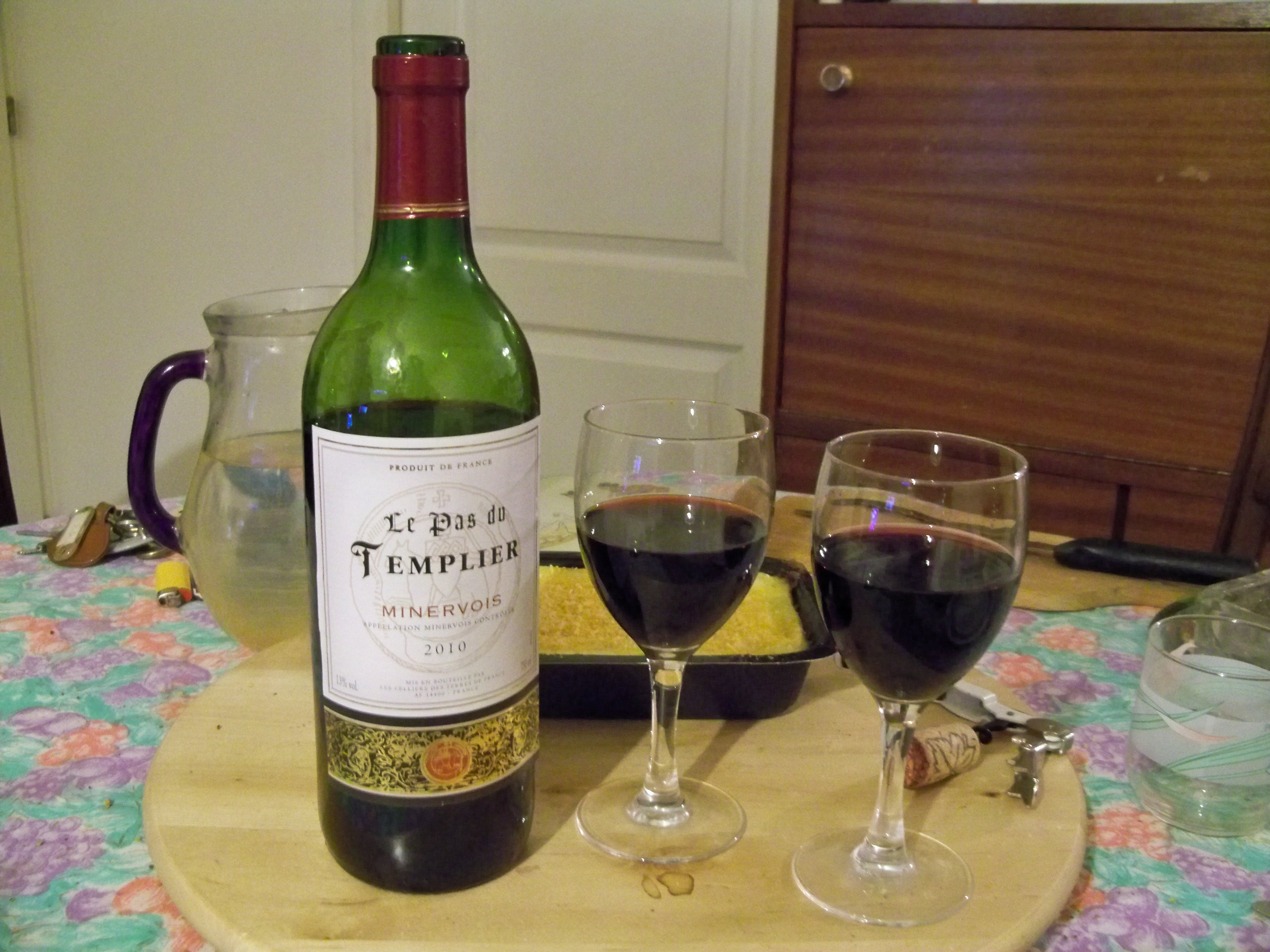
Terret noir is a permitted variety in the red wines of the Minervois AOC.

- Coteaux de Pierrevert AOC, permitted as a minor blending component in the red and rosé wines behind Carignan, Cinsault, Grenache, Mourvedre and Petite Syrah. Grapes destined for AOC production must be harvested a yield no greater than 50 hl/ha with the finished wines needing to attain a minimum alcohol level of at least 11%.
- Côtes du Rhône AOC, permitted as a minor blending component in the red and rosé wines behind Grenache, Syrah, Mourvedre, Carignan, Cinsault, Muscardin, Camarese, Picpoul noir, Grenache gris and Clairette rosé. Grapes destined for AOC production must be harvested a yield no greater than 52 hl/ha with the finished wines needing to attain a minimum alcohol level of at least 11%.
- Côtes du Rhône Villages AOC, permitted as a minor blending component in the red and rosé wines behind Grenache (25-65%), Syrah, Cinsault and Mourvedre which collectively must account for at least 25% with Terret noir, Carignan, Muscardin, Cammarese and Picpoul permitted to fill in any remaining amount. Grapes destined for AOC production must be harvested a yield no greater than 42 hl/ha with the finished wines needing to attain a minimum alcohol level of at least 12.5%
- Minervois AOC, permitted in the red and rosé wines up to a maximum of 40% with at least 60% of the blend needing to be a collective of Syrah (minimum 10% on its own), Mourvedre, Lladoner Pelut and Grenache, with Carignan, Cinsault, Picpoul and Aspiran noir permitted to fill in the remaining components of the blend. Grapes destined for AOC production must be harvested a yield no greater than 50 hl/ha with the finished wines needing to attain a minimum alcohol level of at least 11.5%. For wines produced around the commune of La Livinière, a special designation of Minervois la Livinière can be produced under the same AOC blending and alcohol requirements with the yield reduced to a maximum of 45 hl/ha.

== Synonyms ==
Terret noir is also known as Terre Chernyi, Terret Bourret and Terret du Pays.
