= Terret blanc =

Variety of grape

Terret blanc is a white French wine grape variety growing primarily in the Languedoc-Roussillon region of southern France. It is a mutation of the Terret vine that also spawned the dark skinned Terret noir and light-skinned Terret gris varieties.

In official statistics, the plantings of two "light-berried" Terret grapes (Blanc and Gris) are often counted together. The varieties reached their peak in French wine productions in the late 1980s when together the Terret varieties were the ninth most widely planted white grape variety. In the Languedoc, plantings of Terret were equal to that of Chardonnay.

== Wine regions and plantings ==
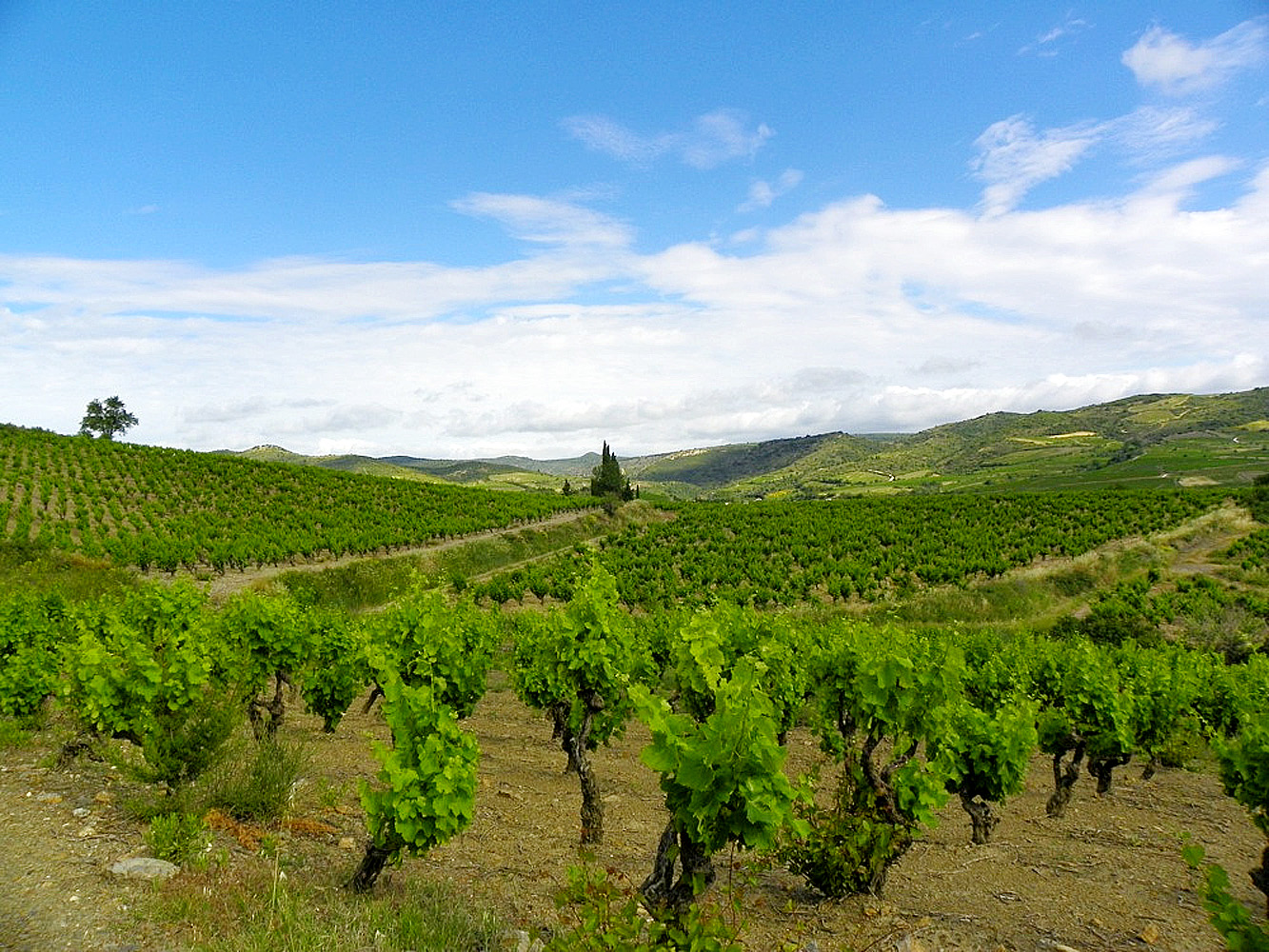
Terret blanc is grown in the Corbières AOC where it is a permitted variety in the white blend from the region.

Terret blanc is a permitted grape variety in several Languedoc AOCs including:

- Corbières AOC, often used in the white wines of the region. Here the grapes are often blended with Bourboulenc, Maccabeo, Grenache blanc, Malvoisie, Clairette blanche, Muscat, Marsanne, Roussanne, Muscat of Alexandria, Muscat Blanc à Petits Grains and Picpoul blanc. Grapes destined for white wine production must be harvested to a yield no greater than 50 hectoliters/hectare with the finished wine needing to attaining a minimum alcohol level of 11% for whites.
- Coteaux du Languedoc, permitted as a blending components in the white wine along with Bourboulenc, Clairette blanche, Grenache blanc, Trebbiano, Maccabeo, Picpoul blanc, Roussanne, Marsanne, Rolle and Viognier. Grapes destined for AOC production must be harvested a yield no greater than 50 hl/ha with the finished wines needing to attain a minimum alcohol level of at least 11%. The minimum rises to 11.5% if the wine has a cru designation--meaning that it was grown in the specially recognized vineyards around Corbières, Mejanelle, St-Christol, Vérargues, Montpeyrous, Pic St-Loup, Quatourze, Saint-Drézéry, St-Georges d'Orques, St-Saturnin and the extinct volcano Montagne de la Clape.

Varietal Terret blancs are a specialty of the commune of Sète in the Hérault department where it is used for the local vermouth and distilled for brandy.

As of 2000, the Institut national de l'origine et de la qualité (INAO) reported that there was 3000 hectares of the light skinned Terrets, of which approximately 2,600 ha (6,400 acres) were believed to be the Terret blanc variety in particular.

== Synonyms ==
Known synonyms of Terret blanc include Bourret blanc, Tarret blanc and Terret monstre.
