= Pinot noir passing-off controversy =

The Pinot noir passing-off controversy arose in 2010 within the wine industry over the passing-off by French distributors of Merlot and Syrah wine as Pinot noir in the United States. The controversy involved the mislabeling of wines from vintners in southern France which were falsely sold to American distributors E & J Gallo Winery as Pinot noir. The mislabeling resulted in a French court convicting twelve people for fraud.

== Background ==
Pinot noir wine is considered particularly difficult to make well. American law requires that wine sold as being from a single varietal must be at least 75 percent composed of the grape in question, and within the European Union, the requirement is a minimum of 85 percent. Accordingly, many American winemakers add less expensive but more robust Merlot and Syrah to improve the mainstream appeal of inexpensive Pinot noir. California wine brands often sell Pinot noir from France, Italy, Chile, and Germany, because it is less expensive to produce there than locally. As a result of the blending and importation practices, wine sold as Pinot noir often does not have the characteristic taste of the grape, and can easily be confused by consumers and experts for other varietals.

Languedoc has been known for centuries for producing simpler and cheaper wine, which has sometimes been passed off by wine merchants as more expensive wine from Bordeaux or Burgundy. The French Appellation d'Origine Contrôlée (AOC) system was created in the 1930s to prevent the practice of mislabeling or diluting expensive wines with cheaper ones.

== The fraud ==
The American producer E&J Gallo received a shipment of bulk wine sufficient to fill 18 million bottles, sold by wholesaler Sieur d'Arques as Pinot noir from the Languedoc-Roussillon wine region of France, which was actually a mix of Merlot and Syrah. Sieur d'Arques in turn had bought the wine from Ducasse Wine Merchants, a wine broker, which had bought less expensive Merlot and Syrah from at least eight agricultural cooperatives in the Carcassonne area. According to The Guardian, French authorities believe that Claude Courset, owner and general manager of Ducasse Wine Merchants, earned approximately 7 million euros from the scam to pass off "cheap plonk" as Pinot noir from January 2006 through March 2008. Gallo had sold the wine under the 2006 vintage of its Red Bicyclette label, at an approximately $8 retail price per bottle, as being 85 percent Pinot noir. Fake Pinot noir was also sold to Constellation Brands, and possibly other American brands.

== Prosecution ==
The scheme was discovered during an audit of Ducasse Wine Merchants. French investigators were suspicious that the firm was buying Pinot noir wine at 40 percent less than the going rate, in quantities that exceeded the historical production level of the region.

On February 17, 2010, 12 people from the Languedoc-Roussillon region of France were convicted by a court in Carcassonne in connection with the fraud, including the head of Ducasse, Claude Courset (described as the "kingpin" of the scheme), executives at Sieur d'Arques, and several cooperatives.

== Aftermath ==
The scandal, described as the largest in French winemaking in recent years, was a public relations "nightmare" that hurt the credibility of the Red Bicyclette brand, and of French wine production generally, at least in the United States. Pinot noir had gained some recognition and popularity among American consumers, in large part due to a conceit in the 2004 independent film Sideways that it was superior to Merlot wine. As a result, consumers had been willing to pay more for the supposedly superior grape. The British press used the occasion to scoff at American consumers for their supposed lack of sophistication in wine. In March, 2010, a wine writer for the San Francisco Chronicle coined the name "Pinotgate" to describe the scandal.

Gallo denied any prior knowledge of the fraud and was not accused of complicity. He has been accused by some of not sufficiently overseeing the quality and authenticity of wine purchased from suppliers. A class-action lawsuit was filed against Gallo in connection with selling the mislabeled bottles.
