= Terret gris =

Variety of grape

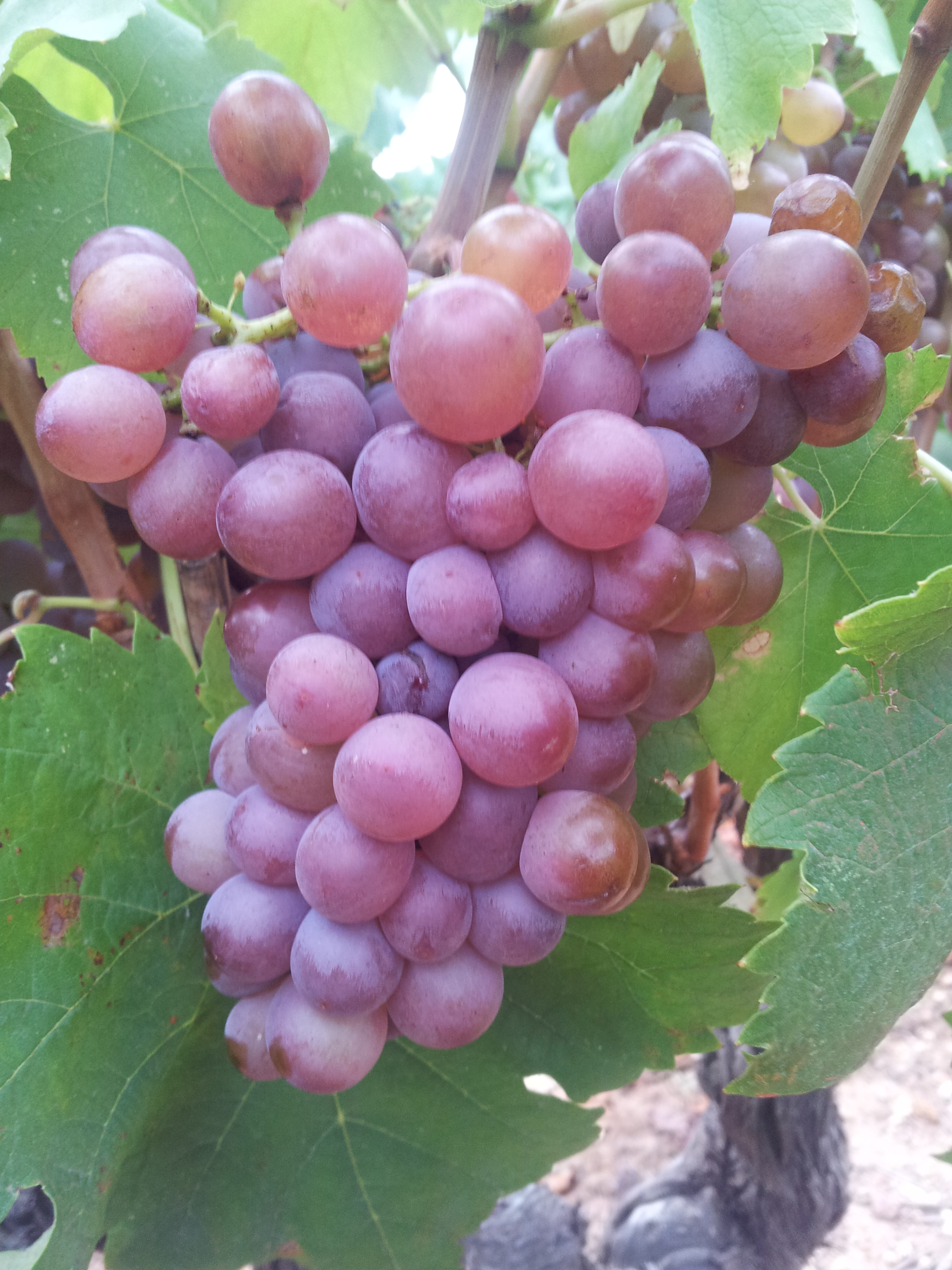

Terret gris is a white French wine grape variety planted primarily in the Languedoc wine region. It is a mutation of the ancient Vitis vinifera vine Terret. Appellation d'origine contrôlée (AOC) regulations allow the grape to be used in white wines from the Corbières, Coteaux du Languedoc and Minervois AOCs as well as some vin de pays. The vine has a very long history in the region and is capable of producing full bodied wines with crisp acidity.

Terret blanc is the white mutation of the grape. In official statistics, the plantings of two "light-berried" Terret grapes (as distinguished from Terret noir, one of the permitted blending grapes for Châteauneuf-du-Pape AOC) are often counted together. The varieties reached their peak in French wine productions in the late 1980s when together the Terret varieties were the ninth most widely planted white grape variety. In the Languedoc, plantings of Terret were equal to that of Chardonnay.

== Wine regions ==
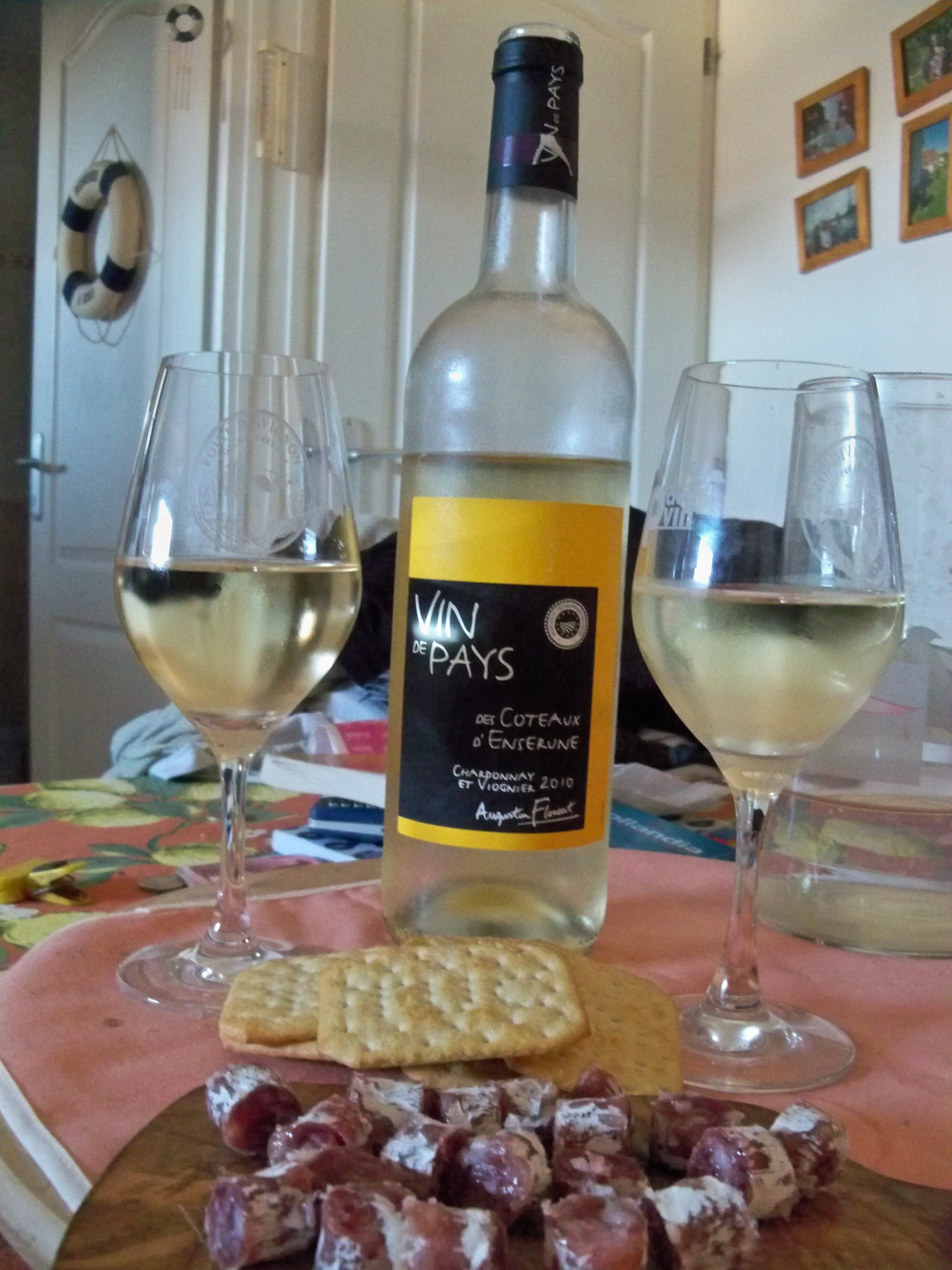
While not as widely planted and used as it once was, Terret gris is still a permitted variety (along with Terret blanc) in some Languedoc AOC but it also can be found in some of the white vin de pays blends from the Languedoc.

Terret gris is most widely planted in the Languedoc region. In the late 1980s, when the variety was at its peak usage, there were over 12,300 acres (5,000 hectares) planted in the region (some plantings were likely Terret blanc which is often counted together in official statistics). The grape is a permitted variety in the white AOC wines of Corbières, Coteaux du Languedoc and Minervois, though its use in the Coteaux du Languedoc was rapidly declining at the end of the 20th century.

As of 2000, the Institut national de l'origine et de la qualité (INAO) reported that there was 3000 hectares of the light skinned Terrets, of which approximately 2,600 ha (6,400 acres) were believed to be the Terret blanc variety in particular.

== Wine styles ==
Terret gris produces a full bodied wine with noticeably acidity. In favorable vintages, the aromas can have a distinctive mineral note.

== Synonyms ==
Over the years, Terret gris and its wines have been known under various synonyms including Bourret, Tarret, Terrain, Terret bourret and Terret rose.
