= Grand noir (disambiguation) =

Grand noir may refer to Grand Noir de la Calmette, a red wine hybrid grape, or one of several wine grapes with Grand noir as a synonym including:

- Baga (grape), a Portuguese wine
- Jurançon (grape), a French wine grape from Southwest France
- Tressot, a French wine grape from Burgundy
- Aspiran Bouschet, a crossing of Aspiran noir and Bouschet Gros
