= Pays d'Oc =

Pays d'Oc may refer to

- Occitania, the historical region in southern Europe defined by language
- Languedoc-Roussillon wine, wine produced in southern France
