= Terret (grape) =

Variety of grape

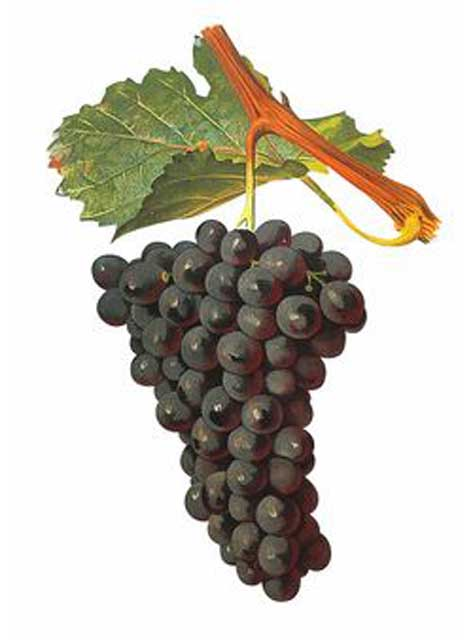
Drawing of Terret noir from an early 20th-century ampelography text.

Terret is an ancient Vitis vinifera vine that, like the parent Pinot vine of Pinot noir's history, mutated over the course of thousands of years into grape varieties of several colors. Originating in the Languedoc-Roussillon wine of southern France, the descendants of Terret now include the red wine variety Terret noir, the white Terret blanc and the light-skinned Terret gris.

For years, the light skin varieties of the Terrets were grown together as field blends and used in Vermouth production. The dark-skinned Terret noir was more highly valued as a permitted variety in the notable Rhône wine of Châteauneuf-du-Pape as well as in the Appellation d'origine contrôlée (AOC)s of Corbières AOC and Minervois AOC in the Languedoc.

== Plantings and identifications ==
In his research, ampelographer Pierre Galet identified Terret vines still growing the Languedoc with vines containing clusters that have different colored berries (red, white, pink) all in the same bunch but the French Institut national de l'origine et de la qualité (INAO) currently doesn't track Terret as a separate planting apart from Terret noir and Terret blanc/gris which are often counted together.

As of 2000, the INAO reported that there was 3000 hectares of the light skinned Terrets growing mostly in Hérault department, of which approximately 2,600 ha (6,400 acres) were believed to be the Terret blanc variety in particular. The dark skin Terret noir accounted for 400 ha (1000 acres) mostly in the Languedoc with some plantings Châteauneuf-du-Pape.

== Viticulture and winemaking ==
All the Terret varieties are noted for their late budding, which helps the vines avoid Spring frost. The grapes ripen relatively early and are able to maintain high levels of acidity.

== See also ==
- Pinot (grape), a disambiguation page listing the many mutated varieties in the Pinot noir family
- Muscat, another old family of grapes that has seen the many different varieties arise
