= Toques et Clochers =

Toques et Clochers is an annual two-day charitable gastronomy festival in Aude, France dedicated to the celebration of Chardonnay production in the Limoux wine appellation, sponsored by the Sieur d'Arques wine cooperative.

The festival has taken place each year since 1991 during the weekend of Palm Sunday in the area of Limoux and Saint-Hilaire. Each year a different village in the appellation is chosen to host the festival and the money raised is used to restore the church in that village. On the first day of the festival, the host village holds a celebration for the public, including wine-tasting, art exhibitions and music. On the second day, the Sieur d'Arques cooperative hosts an auction of local wines and a gala dinner. The wine auction is presided over by Michelin starred chefs who also create the gala dinner, while an award-winning sommelier selects the wines.

In 2008, the auction of wines raised 537,750 euros.

The event's name refers to the tall hats worn by chefs (toques) and bell towers or steeples (clochers), since the money raised from the auctions is given to churches to restore their belltowers.

In 2018, the first day of the festival, due to be held in the village of Loupia, was cancelled as a mark of respect to those killed a day earlier in an Islamist terror attack in nearby Trebes and Carcassonne.
