= Cazevieille =

- Commune
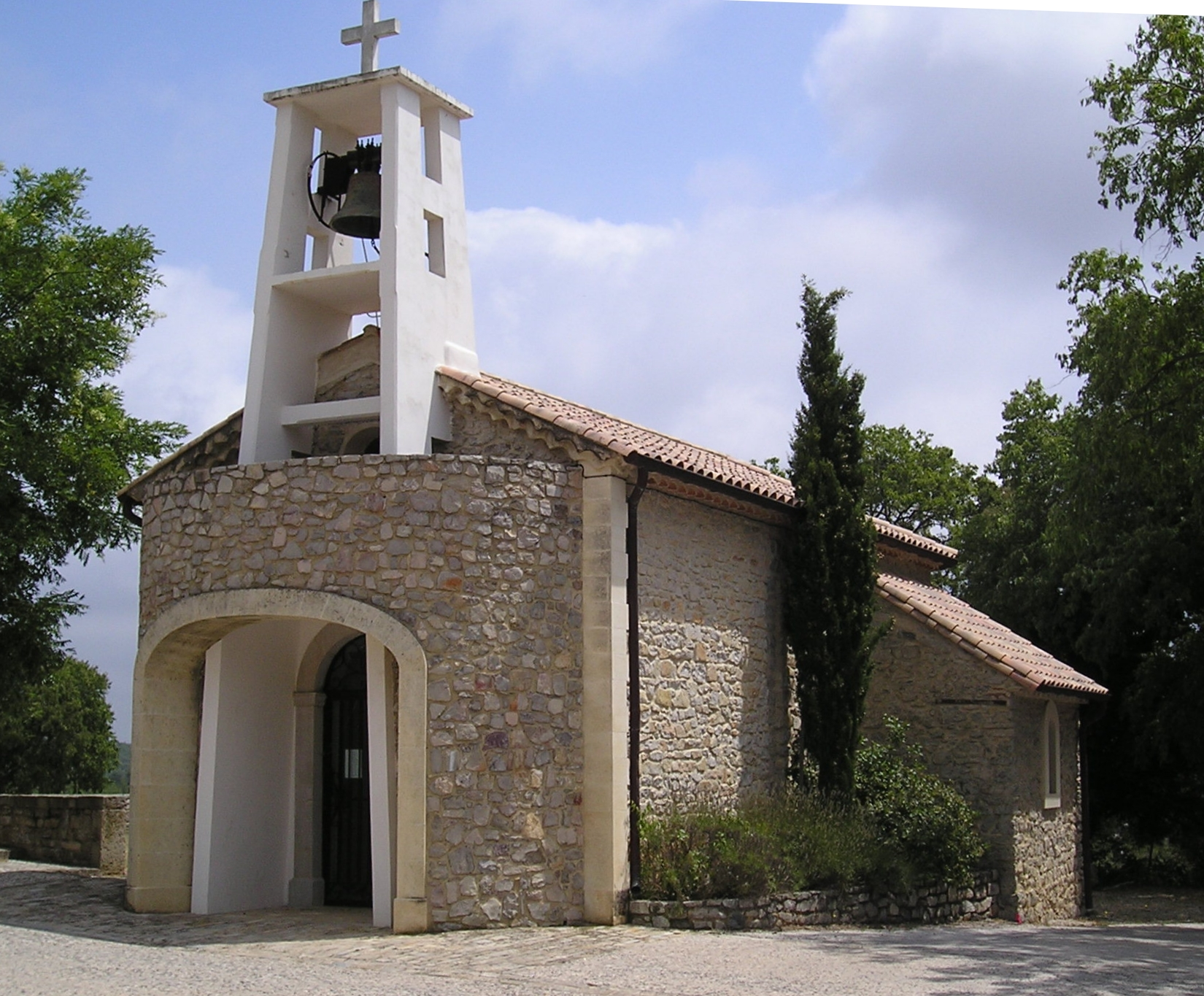
- Church

- Coat of arms
- Location of Cazevieille
- Location within France Location within Occitanie
- Coordinates: 43°46′15″N 3°47′22″E
- Country: France
- Region: Occitania
- Department: Hérault
- Arrondissement: Lodève
- Canton: Saint-Gély-du-Fesc

Government
  - Mayor (2023–2026): Thomas Bay
- Area^{1}: 16.21 km^{2} (6.26 sq mi)
- Highest elevation: 658 m (2,159 ft)
- Lowest elevation: 160 m (520 ft)
- Population (2023): 233
  - Density: 14.4/km^{2} (37.2/sq mi)
- Time zone: UTC+01:00 (CET)
  - Summer (DST): UTC+02:00 (CEST)
- INSEE/Postal code: 34066 /34270
- ^{1} French Land Register data, which excludes lakes, ponds, glaciers > 1 km^{2} (0.386 sq mi or 247 acres) and river estuaries.

Cazevieille (French pronunciation: [kazvjɛj]; Occitan: Casavièlha) is a commune in the Hérault department in southern France.

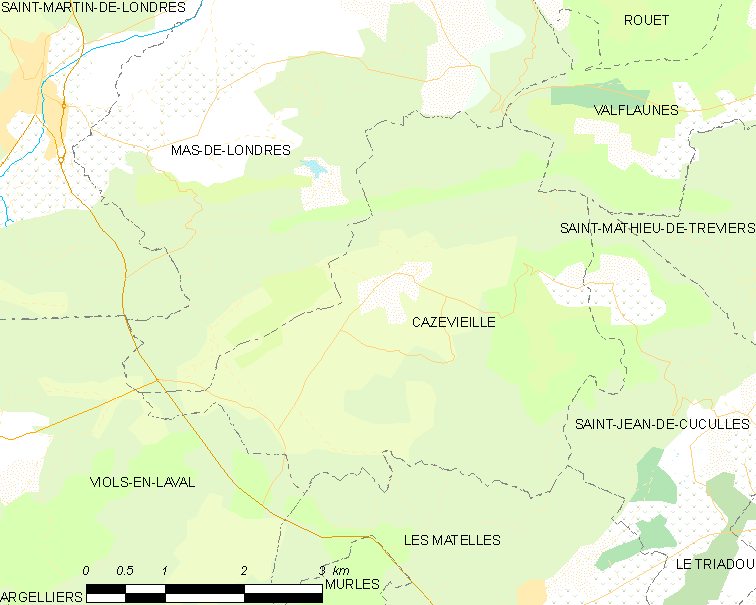
Map

== Population ==
Historical population
Year	Pop.	±% p.a.
1968	26	—
1975	24	−1.14%
1982	58	+13.43%
1990	105	+7.70%
1999	118	+1.31%
2007	172	+4.82%
2012	197	+2.75%
2017	185	−1.25%
2023	233	+3.92%
Source: INSEE

== See also ==
- Communes of the Hérault department
- Pic Saint-Loup
