= Sieur d'Arques =

Coordinates: 43.0555°N 2.2051°E

Aimery Sieur d'Arques
- Trade name: Sieur d'Arques
- Headquarters: Limoux, France
- Key people: Maurice Lautard, président Laurent Lechat, directeur général Guilhem Marty, directeur technique
- Website: www.sieurdarques.com

Sieur d'Arques is a wine producer cooperative located in Limoux in the Languedoc-Roussillon area of France. It produces the Red Bicyclette brand of wine, marketed in the United States by E & J Gallo Winery.

In 2012, Pierre Mirc retired as chairman of Sieur d'Arques. Current executives include Maurice Lautard, chairman; Laurent Lechat, general manager; Guilhem Marty, technical director.

== History ==
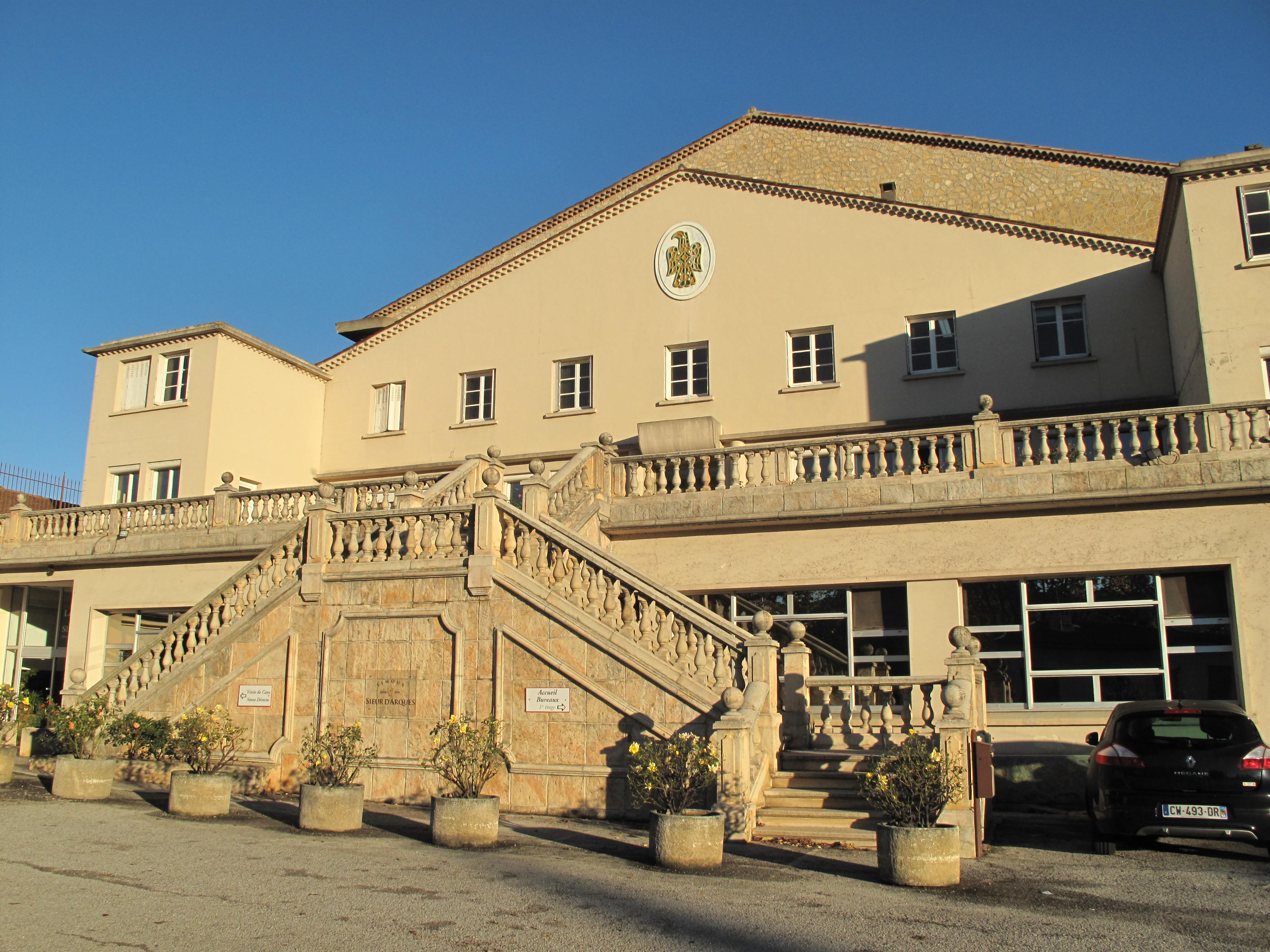
Premises in Limoux

In 1531, Benedictine monks in the Abbaye de Saint-Hilaire (a neighbouring commune of Limoux) noticed that bubbles had appeared in fermenting wine.

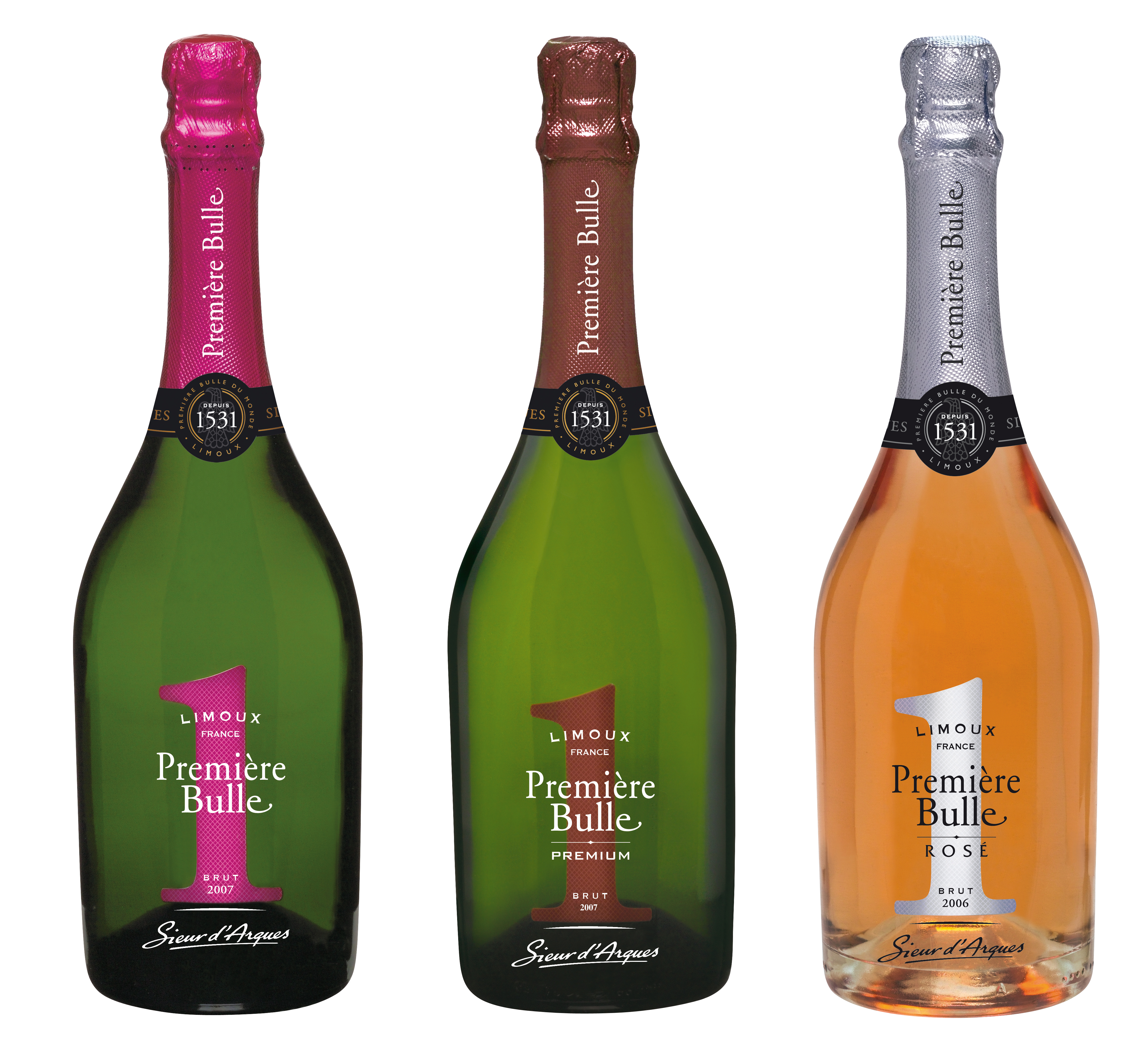
Première Bulle wines produced by Sieur d'Arques (Première Bulle, Première Bulle Premium, Première Bulle Rosé)

== Passing-off controversy ==
Sieur d'Arques were prosecuted in 2010 for passing off wines blended from other grape varieties as pinot noir in order to charge higher prices to E. & J. Gallo, for whom this was their most popular variety. The amount of imitation pinot noir sold in this way exceeded the production of the Languedoc region and this scandal was said to have damaged the region's reputation. The defendants were convicted. Jail sentences were given but suspended and fines of up to €180,000 were levied.

== Toques et Clochers ==
Sieur d'Arques sponsors the annual Toques et Clochers gastronomy festival in Aude.
