= Fat Bastard (wine) =

French wine brand

Fat Bastard (stylized as Fat bastard) is a brand of French wine introduced in 1998 and produced and distributed by a French and British partnership that began as a collaboration between French winemaker Thierry Boudinaud and British wine importer Guy Anderson. Originally launched as a Chardonnay, the brand has been expanded to include additional varietals including Merlot, Syrah, Sauvignon Blanc and Cabernet Sauvignon. It is sold primarily in the United States, and has been discontinued on the U.K. market. The price point for the brand is at the modest "entry level", at about $8 per bottle (as of 2006), and about 420,000 cases (5 million 750 ml bottles) per year for the brand are exported to the U.S. market (as of 2016). The brand's Chardonnay is (or has been at one time) the largest-selling brand of French Chardonnay in the United States. The label features a cartoon hippopotamus.

== History ==
The brand began as a collaboration between French winemaker Thierry Boudinaud and British wine importer Guy Anderson that was launched as a company in 1995. The original intention of the partnership was to sell wines produced in the Languedoc-Roussillon region of southern France to foreign markets.

Many American consumers, especially younger ones, have come to dislike traditional European wine labels that typically feature a picture of a classic chateau and are difficult to distinguish, understand, and remember. "Even if people love a French wine, they can't remember its name", Anderson said. The creators of the Fat Bastard brand attempted to solve these marketing problems by employing a label name that is overtly rude. The brand is an example of a world-wide trend of various brands that have embraced a similar strategy, trying to stand out from the crowd as the number of brands available on the market has continued to increase. Another French wine brand of the Luangedoc-Rousillion region that is also marketed with similarly distinctive informal name, a fanciful cartoon drawing on the label (featuring a Frenchman riding a red bike), and modest pricing (less than $10) is Red Bicyclette, introduced by Gallo in 2004.

The brand name is said to have started off with an experimental batch of Chardonnay that had been kept in a barrel with yeast sediment longer than usual and had developed a very full-bodied taste. When Boudinaud tasted the wine, he proclaimed "Now that is what you call a fat-bastard wine." The name functions as a bilingual pun, alluding to the buttery taste of the Chardonnay being similar to that of the famous appellation d'origine controlee of Bâtard-Montrachet. The wine label now carries an apocryphal claim that it was "named after a British expression describing a particularly rich and full wine".

The brand was introduced on the market in 1998. The production run for the first vintage was only 800 cases (about ten thousand 750 ml bottles), but as time passed, the brand became the largest-selling French Chardonnay in the United States. In 2006, 500,000 cases (equivalent to 6 million 750 ml bottles) of the brand were sold in the U.S. market.

As of 2016, the brand is no longer sold in the U.K. Wine writers Oz Clarke and James May of the BBC television series Oz and James's Big Wine Adventure said this is "simply because these fun-named wines have gone out of fashion". However, about 420,000 cases (5 million 750 ml bottles) per year continue to be exported to the United States.

== Controversies ==
The wine's arguably offensive name has helped to draw attention to the brand, but has also caused some problems in its marketing and distribution.

The Advertising Standards Association of Iceland banned the mass-mailing of an advertisement circular that featured the wine on its cover and had been sent to 175,000 homes and a primary school. It said that the product's name was "unsuitable to be seen by young children and should not have featured on the outside covers of the circulars" that had been "distributed to homes in an un-targeted manner".

The brand was banned in the American states of Texas and Ohio due to its name, but was reported to be available in 22 other U.S. states (as of 2009).
