= Aspiran (grape) =

Variety of grape

- Grape (Vitis)
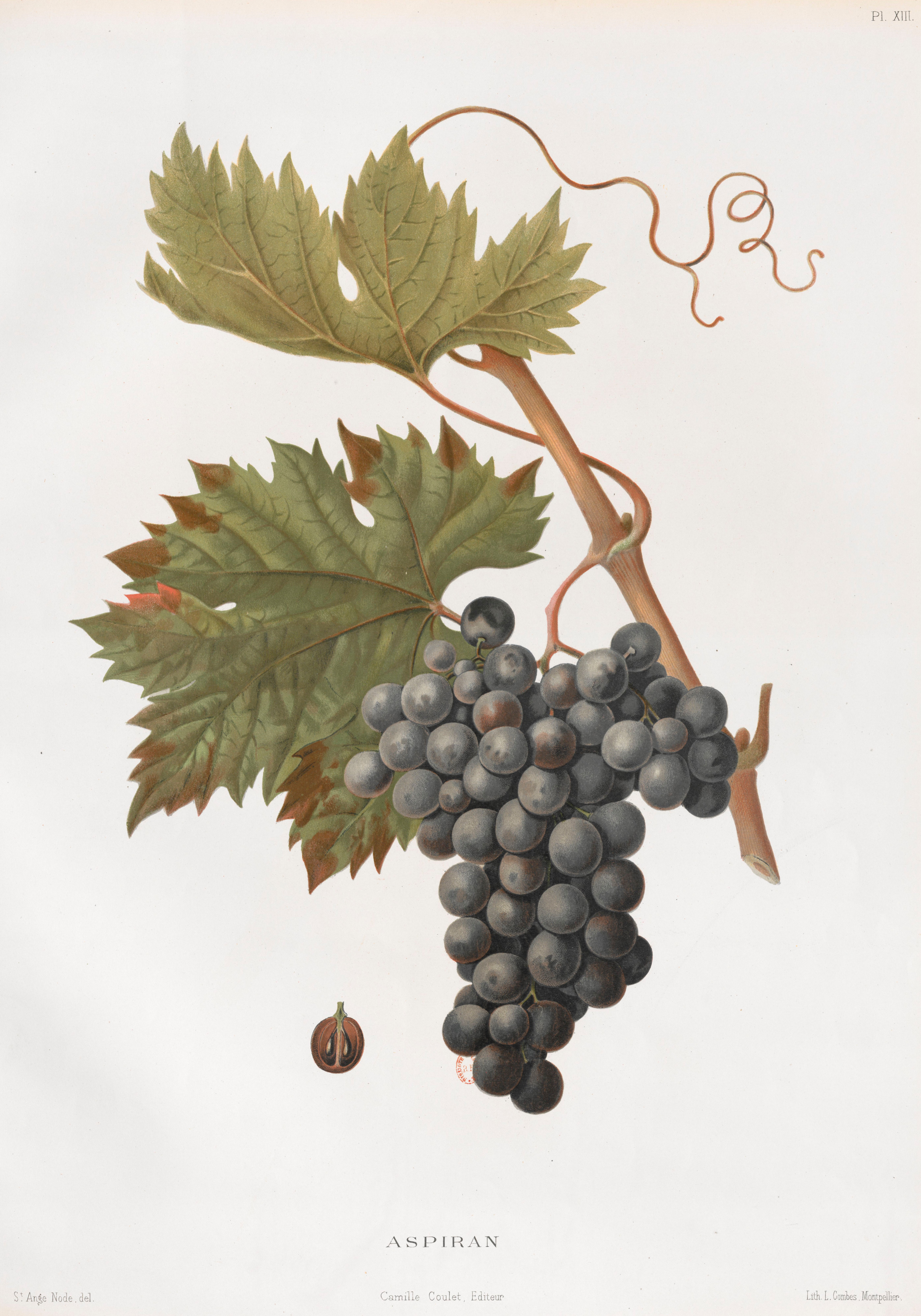
- Lithograph of Aspiran
- Color of berry skin: Noir
- Species: Vitis vinifera
- Also called: Aspiran noir and other synonyms
- Origin: France
- VIVC number: 697

Aspiran (or Aspiran noir) is a red French wine grape variety planted primarily in the Languedoc where it permitted under Appellation d'origine contrôlée (AOC) regulations in the red and rosé wines of the Minervois AOC. Aspiran is a very old variety with a long history of producing light bodied and perfumed wines.

== History ==
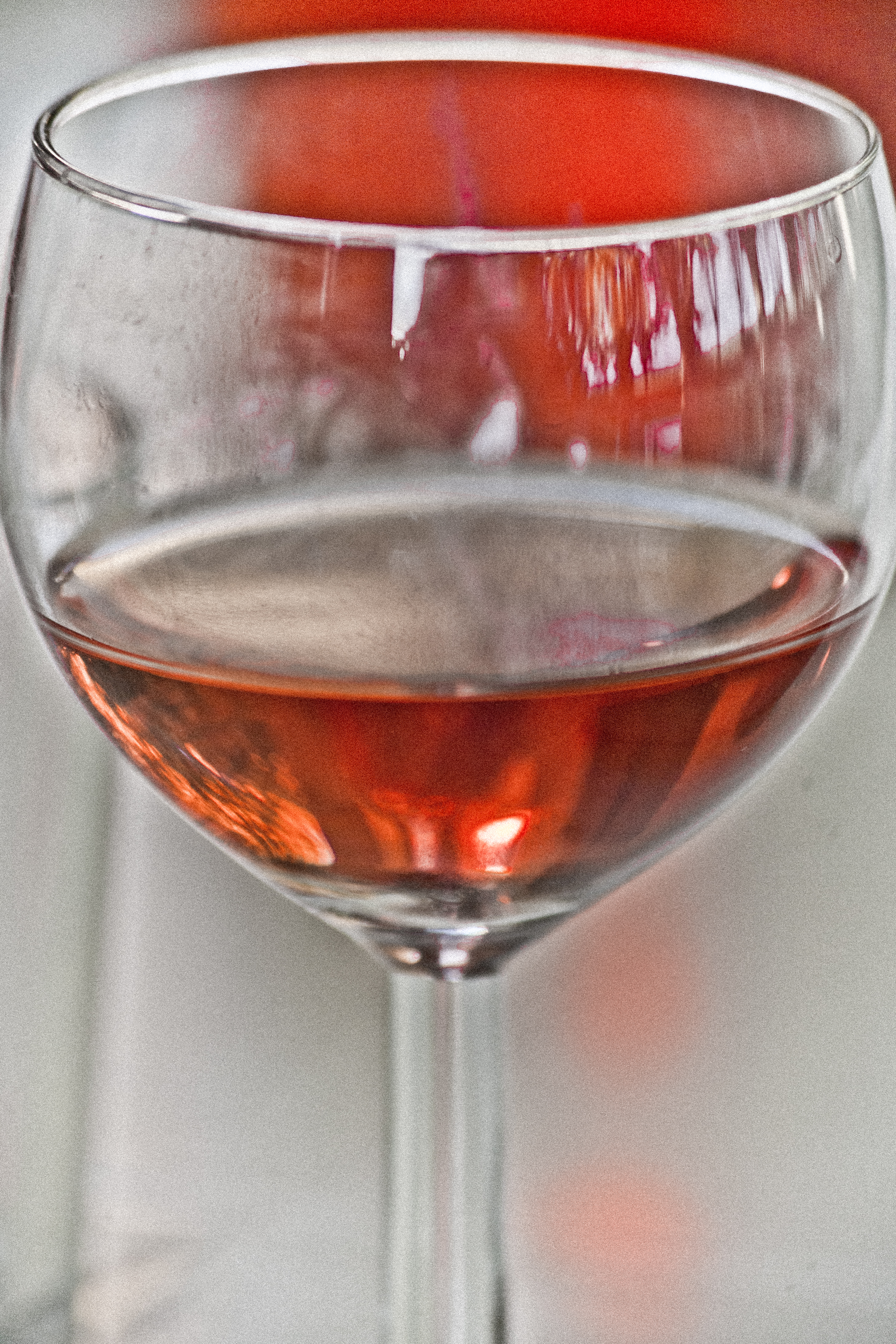
Aspiran noir is a permitted variety in the rosé wines of the Minervois AOC.

Before the phylloxera epidemic, Aspiran was common in Languedoc, in particular in Hérault, where it once represented one quarter of the plantations in this department. The grape variety is probably named after the town Aspiran in Hérault. The severe frost in 1956 killed off much of the then existing Aspiran plantations. In 1988, only 7 hectares (17 acres) remained, and the variety is usually not being replanted.

== Other grape varieties ==
There are also several other grape varieties where Aspiran forms part of their name, including Aspiran blanc and Aspiran gris, but only Aspiran noir is simply called "Aspiran". Aspiran should not be confused with the Greek white grape variety Aspirant.

== Synonyms ==
Aspiran noir is also known under the synonyms Aspiran, Aspiran Chernyi, Aspiran Csornüj, Aspirant, Epiran, Espiran, Peyral, Peyrar, Piran, Ribeyrenc, Riverain, Riveyrenc, Riveyrene, Spiran, Verdai, Verdal, and Verdal noir.
