= Pic Saint-Loup =

Mountain in Languedoc-Roussillon, southern France

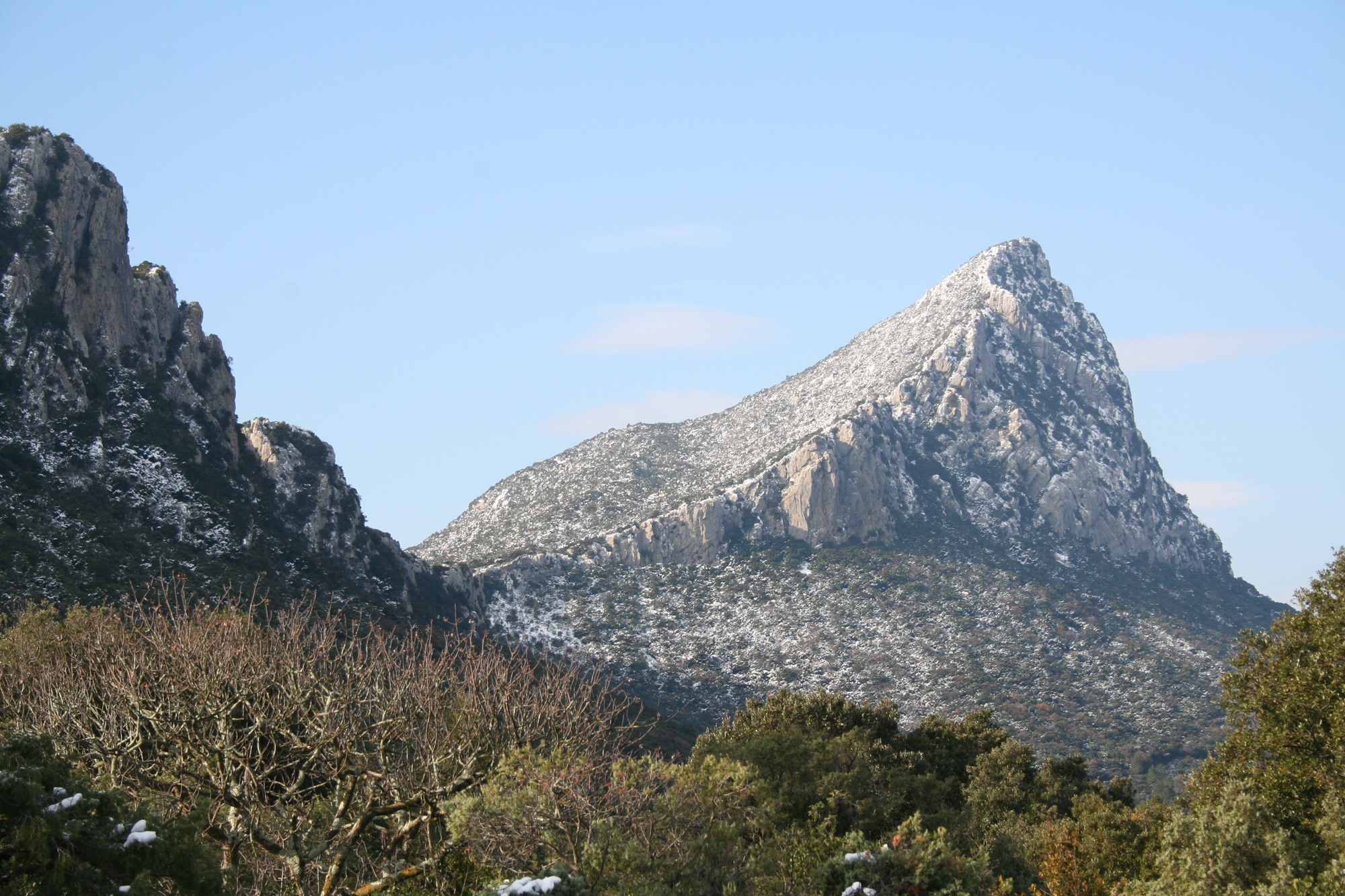

Highest point
- Elevation: 658 m (2,159 ft)
- Coordinates: 43°46′43″N 3°48′41″E

Geography
- Location within France
- Location: Hérault, France
- Parent range: Massif Central

Pic Saint-Loup (Languedocien: Puòg de Sant Lop) is a mountain in Languedoc-Roussillon, southern France, located near the communes of Cazevieille and Saint-Mathieu-de-Tréviers in the Hérault department.
