= Saint-Saturnin-de-Lucian =

- Commune
- Coat of arms
- Location of Saint-Saturnin-de-Lucian
- Location within France Location within Occitanie
- Coordinates: 43°41′42″N 3°28′18″E
- Country: France
- Region: Occitania
- Department: Hérault
- Arrondissement: Lodève
- Canton: Gignac
- Intercommunality: Vallée de l'Hérault

Government
  - Mayor (2020–2026): Florence Quinonero
- Area^{1}: 9.83 km^{2} (3.80 sq mi)
- Elevation: 150 m (490 ft)
- Highest elevation: 720 m (2,360 ft)
- Lowest elevation: 118 m (387 ft)
- Population (2023): 303
  - Density: 30.8/km^{2} (79.8/sq mi)
- Time zone: UTC+01:00 (CET)
  - Summer (DST): UTC+02:00 (CEST)
- INSEE/Postal code: 34287 /34725
- ^{1} French Land Register data, which excludes lakes, ponds, glaciers > 1 km^{2} (0.386 sq mi or 247 acres) and river estuaries.

Saint-Saturnin-de-Lucian (French pronunciation: [sɛ̃ satyʁnɛ̃ də lysjɑ̃]; Languedocien: Sant Adornin, before 1991: Saint-Saturnin) is a commune in the Hérault department in the Occitanie region in southern France.

== Population ==
Historical population
Year	Pop.	±% p.a.
1968	265	—
1975	250	−0.83%
1982	208	−2.59%
1990	199	−0.55%
1999	229	+1.57%
2007	288	+2.91%
2012	310	+1.48%
2017	276	−2.30%
2023	303	+1.57%
Source: INSEE

== See also ==
- Communes of the Hérault department
