= Montpeyroux, Hérault =

Montpeyroux
- Commune
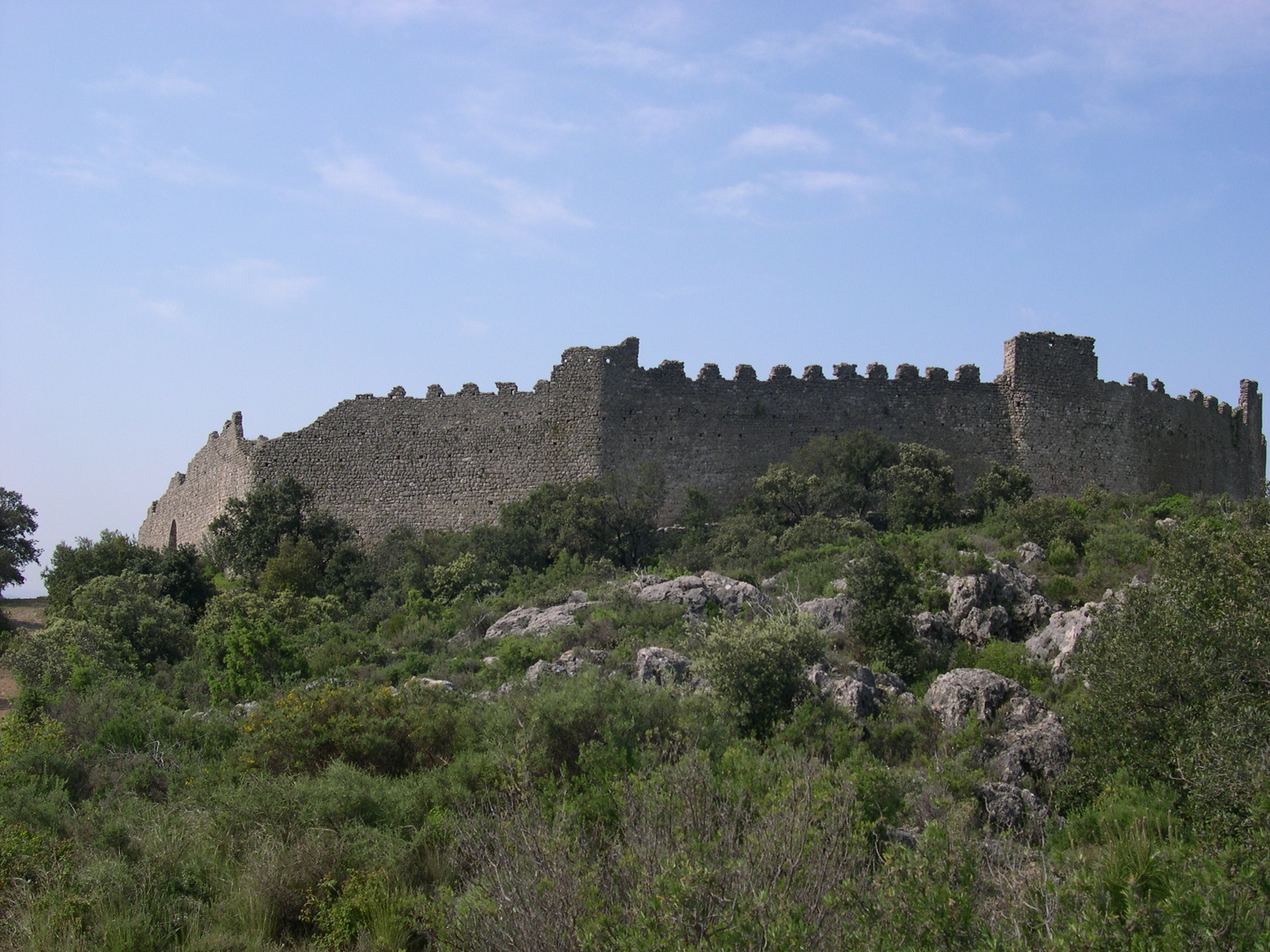
- Castellas

- Coat of arms
- Location of Montpeyroux
- Location within France Location within Occitanie
- Coordinates: 43°41′46″N 3°30′25″E
- Country: France
- Region: Occitania
- Department: Hérault
- Arrondissement: Lodève
- Canton: Gignac
- Intercommunality: Vallée de l'Hérault

Government
  - Mayor (2020–2026): Claude Carceller
- Area^{1}: 22.42 km^{2} (8.66 sq mi)
- Elevation: 128 m (420 ft)
- Highest elevation: 841 m (2,759 ft)
- Lowest elevation: 66 m (217 ft)
- Population (2023): 1,449
  - Density: 64.63/km^{2} (167.4/sq mi)
- Time zone: UTC+01:00 (CET)
  - Summer (DST): UTC+02:00 (CEST)
- INSEE/Postal code: 34173 /34150
- ^{1} French Land Register data, which excludes lakes, ponds, glaciers > 1 km^{2} (0.386 sq mi or 247 acres) and river estuaries.

Montpeyroux (French pronunciation: [mɔ̃peʁu]; Occitan: Montpeirós) is a commune in the Hérault department in the Occitanie region in southern France.

== Population ==
Historical population
Year	Pop.	±% p.a.
1968	845	—
1975	779	−1.16%
1982	806	+0.49%
1990	947	+2.04%
1999	1,084	+1.51%
2007	1,183	+1.10%
2012	1,274	+1.49%
2017	1,340	+1.02%
2023	1,449	+1.31%
Source: INSEE

== See also ==
- Communes of the Hérault department
