= Red Bicyclette =

French wine

Red Bicyclette label art

Red Bicyclette is a French wine produced by the Sieur d'Arques cooperative and distributed in the United States by the E. & J. Gallo Winery. Its distinctive label appeals to consumers who prefer branded wines, labelled with the variety of grape from which they are made, rather than by the exact location. The following grape varieties are sold under the Red Bicyclette label: chardonnay, merlot, pinot noir, rosé and syrah.

== Passing-off controversy ==
Sieur d'Arques were prosecuted in 2010 for passing off wines blended from other grape varieties as pinot noir in order to charge higher prices to E. & J. Gallo, for whom this was their most popular variety. The amount of imitation pinot noir sold in this way exceeded the production of the Languedoc region and this scandal was said to have damaged the region's reputation. The defendants were convicted. Jail sentences were given but suspended and fines of up to €180,000 were levied.

== See also ==
- Fat Bastard (wine)
- Plan Bordeaux

== Bibliography ==
- Franson, Paul (March 1, 2006). "Labels Gone Wild". Wine Magazine. pp. 28–33.
