= Languedoc-Roussillon wine =

Classification of wine produced in southern France

The Languedoc-Roussillon wine region and the location of the region's appellations.

Languedoc-Roussillon wine (French pronunciation: [lɑ̃ɡ(ə)dɔk ʁusijɔ̃]; Occitan: vin de Lengadòc-Rosselhon), including the vin de pays labeled Vin de Pays d'Oc, is produced in southern France. While "Languedoc" can refer to a specific historic region of France and Northern Catalonia, usage since the 20th century (especially in the context of wine) has primarily referred to the northern part of the Languedoc-Roussillon region of France, an area which spans the Mediterranean coastline from the French border with Spain to the region of Provence. The area has around 700,000 acres (2,800 km^{2}) under vines and is the single biggest wine-producing region in the world, being responsible for more than a third of France's total wine production. In 2001, the region produced more wine than the United States.

== History ==
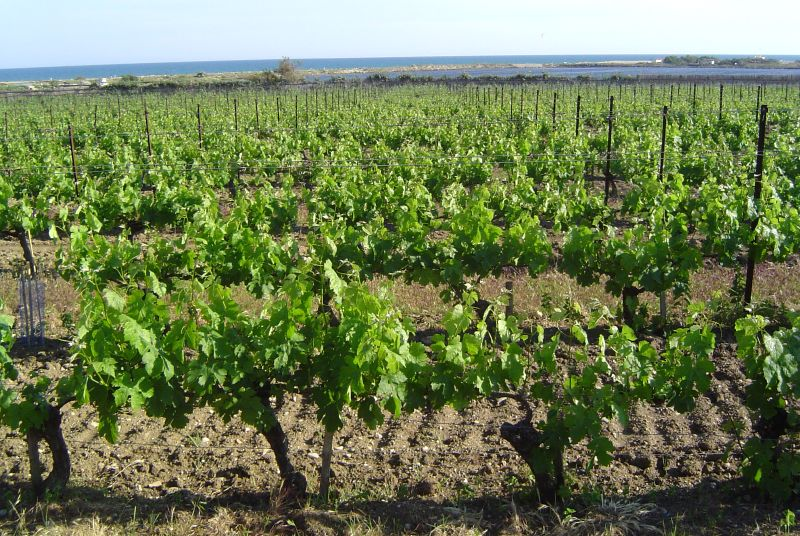
A vineyard in Villeneuve-lès-Maguelone bordering the Gulf of Lion.

The history of Languedoc wines can be traced to the first vineyards planted along the coast near Narbonne by the early Greeks in the fifth century BC. Along with parts of Provence, Rhône, and Corsica, these are the oldest planted vineyards in France. The region of Languedoc has belonged to France since the thirteenth century and the Roussillon was acquired from Spain in the mid-seventeenth century. The two regions were joined as one administrative region in the late 1980s.

From the 4th century through the 18th and early 19th centuries, the Languedoc had a reputation for producing high quality wine. In Paris during the 14th century, wines from the St. Chinian area were prescribed in hospitals for their "healing powers". During the advent of the Industrial Age in the late 19th century, production shifted towards mass-produced le gros rouge—cheap red wine that could satisfy the growing work force. The use of highly prolific grape varieties produced high yields and thin wines, which were normally blended with red wine from Algeria to give them more body.

The phylloxera epidemic in the 19th century severely affected the Languedoc wine industry, killing off many of the higher quality Vitis vinifera that were susceptible to the louse. American rootstock that was naturally resistant to phylloxera did not take well to the limestone soil on the hillside. In place of these vines, acres of the lower quality Aramon, Alicante Bouschet and Carignan were planted.

During both World Wars the Languedoc was responsible for providing the daily wine rations given to French soldiers. In 1962, Algeria gained its independence from France, bringing about an end to the blending of the stronger Algerian red wine to mask the thin le gros rouge. This event, coupled with French consumers moving away from cheap red wines in the 1970s, has contributed to several decades of surplus wine production in France, with Languedoc as the largest contributor to the European "wine lake" and recurring European Union subsidies aimed at reducing production. These developments prompted many Languedoc producers to start refocusing on higher quality, but has also led to many local and regional protests, including violent ones from the infamous Comité Régional d'Action Viticole (CRAV).

Despite the general reputation as a mass producer and a consensus that the region is in the midst of an economic crisis, parts of the Languedoc wine industry are experiencing commercial success due to outside investment and an increased focus on quality. Sales have been improved by many vineyards that concentrate on creating a good brand name rather than relying on the sometimes infamous regional designations. Some vineyards have adopted the youngest batch of AOC classifications developed in the late 1990s, while other vineyards eschew designated blends entirely and are instead shifting toward bottling single varietal wines, a practice increasingly demanded by consumers in the large New World wine market.

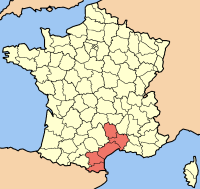
Languedoc-Roussillon Region

== Climate and geography ==
The Languedoc-Roussillon region shares many terrain and climate characteristics with the neighboring regions of Southern Rhône and Provence. The region stretches 150 miles (240 km) from the Banyuls AOC at the Spanish border and Pyrenees in the west, along the coast of the Mediterranean Sea to the river Rhône and Provence in the east. The northern boundaries of the region sit on the Massif Central with the Cévennes mountain ranges and valleys dominating the area. Many vineyards are located along the river Hérault.

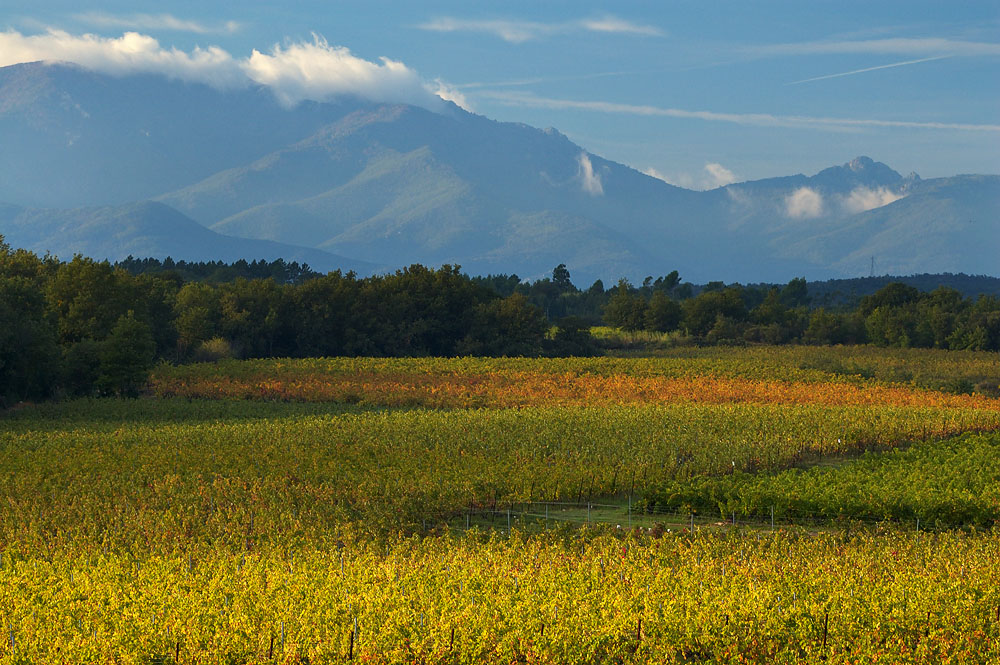
Vineyard near Forques, with Pyrenees in the distance

Vineyards in the Languedoc are generally planted along the coastal plains of the Mediterranean while those in the Roussillon are to be found in the narrow valleys around the Pyrenees. The peak growing season (between May and August) is very dry and the majority of annual rainfall occurs during the winter. In the Languedoc, the plains area is the most arid and hottest region of France. The region's Mediterranean climate is very conducive to growing a large amount of a wide variety of grapes, with vintners in the area excelling in mass production. The average annual temperature is 57 °F (14 °C). The tramontane inland wind from the northwest often accentuates the dry climate; drought is the most common threat to vine production, with French AOC and European Union regulation prohibiting the use of irrigation. In December 2006, the French government responded to global warming concerns and relaxed some of the irrigation regulations.

In 1999 severe weather had damaging effects on the wine producing industry, including hailstorms in May that affected Roussillon and a rain surge in mid November that saw a year's worth of rain fall in 36 hours in the areas of Corbières and Minervois in the western Languedoc.

The composition of soil in the Languedoc varies from the chalk, limestone and gravel based soils inland to more alluvial soils near the coast. Some of the more highly rated vineyards are laid on top of ancient riverbed stones similar to those of Châteauneuf-du-Pape.

== Appellations ==
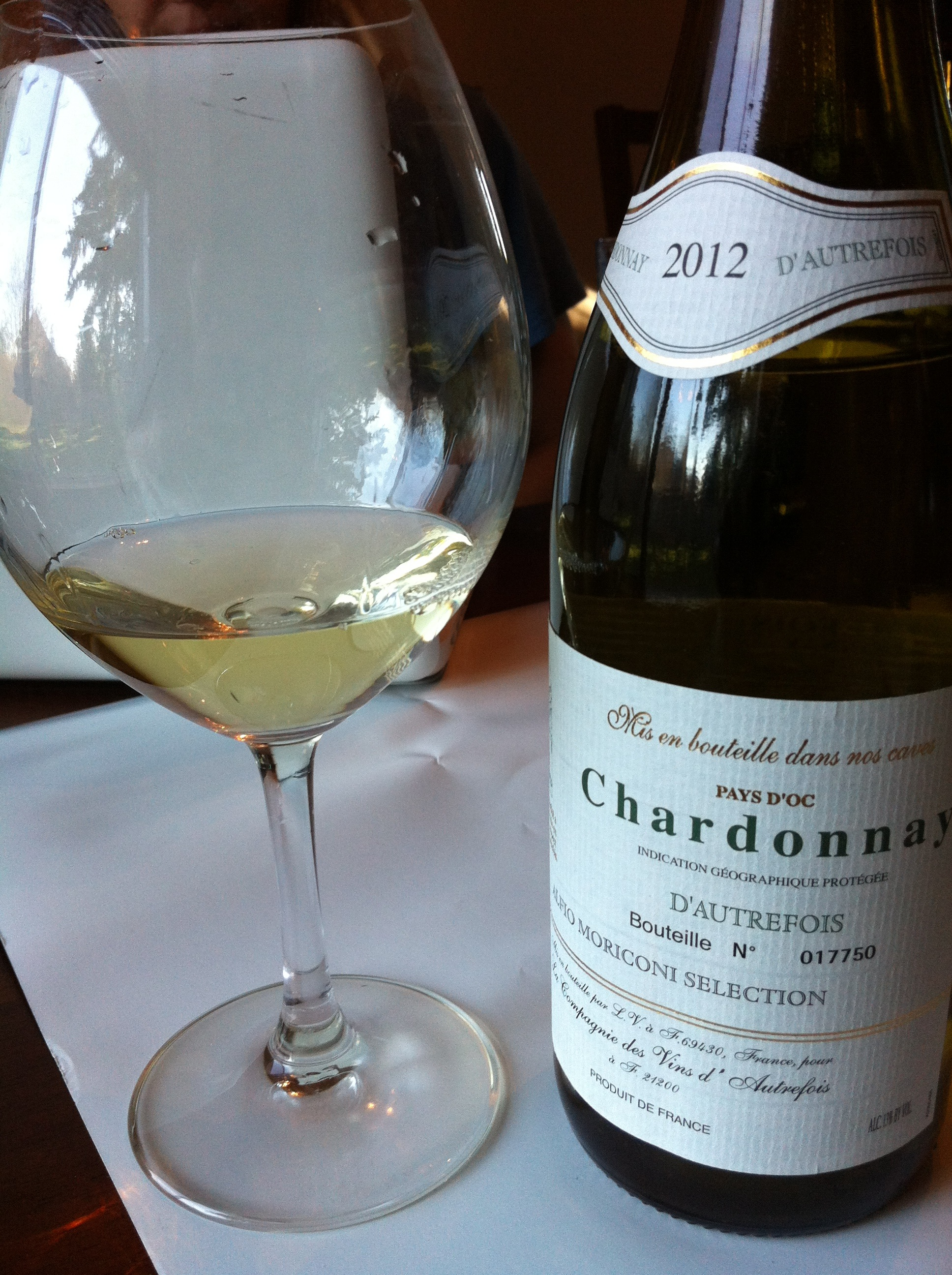
A Chardonnay from the Pays d'Oc.

The five best known appellations in the Languedoc include Languedoc AOC (formerly known as the Coteaux du Languedoc), Corbières AOC, Faugères, Minervois AOC, and Saint-Chinian AOCs. The vast majority of Languedoc wines are produced by wine cooperatives which number more than 500. However, the appellation system in the region is undergoing considerable changes with both new appellations being created and existing ones changing. One recent change is that the Coteaux du Languedoc has changed name to Languedoc and been extended to include also the Roussillon.

Within the larger Languedoc AOC appellations are several sub-districts, or Cru's, with distinct wine styles of their own. Some of these sub-districts have pending AOC applications to become appellations in their own right and some have been granted sub-appellations to the umbrella appellation Languedoc AOC. These include the Quatourze, La Clape, Montpeyroux, St. Saturnin, Picpoul de Pinet, Terrasses du Larzac, and Pic St.-Loup.

The boundary of the eastern Languedoc with the Southern Rhône Valley wine region was moved slightly in 2004, with the result that Costières de Nîmes AOC is now a Rhône appellation rather than a Languedoc one. In that year, INAO moved the responsibility for oversight of this appellation's wine to the regional committee of the Rhône valley. Local producers of Côtes du Rhône-styled wines made from Syrah and Grenache lobbied for this change since the local winemaking traditions did not coincide with administrative borders, and presumably due to the greater prestige of Rhône wines in the marketplace. Such changes of borders between wine regions are very rare, so out of habit, Costières de Nîmes remains listed as a Languedoc wine in many publications.

== Grapes ==
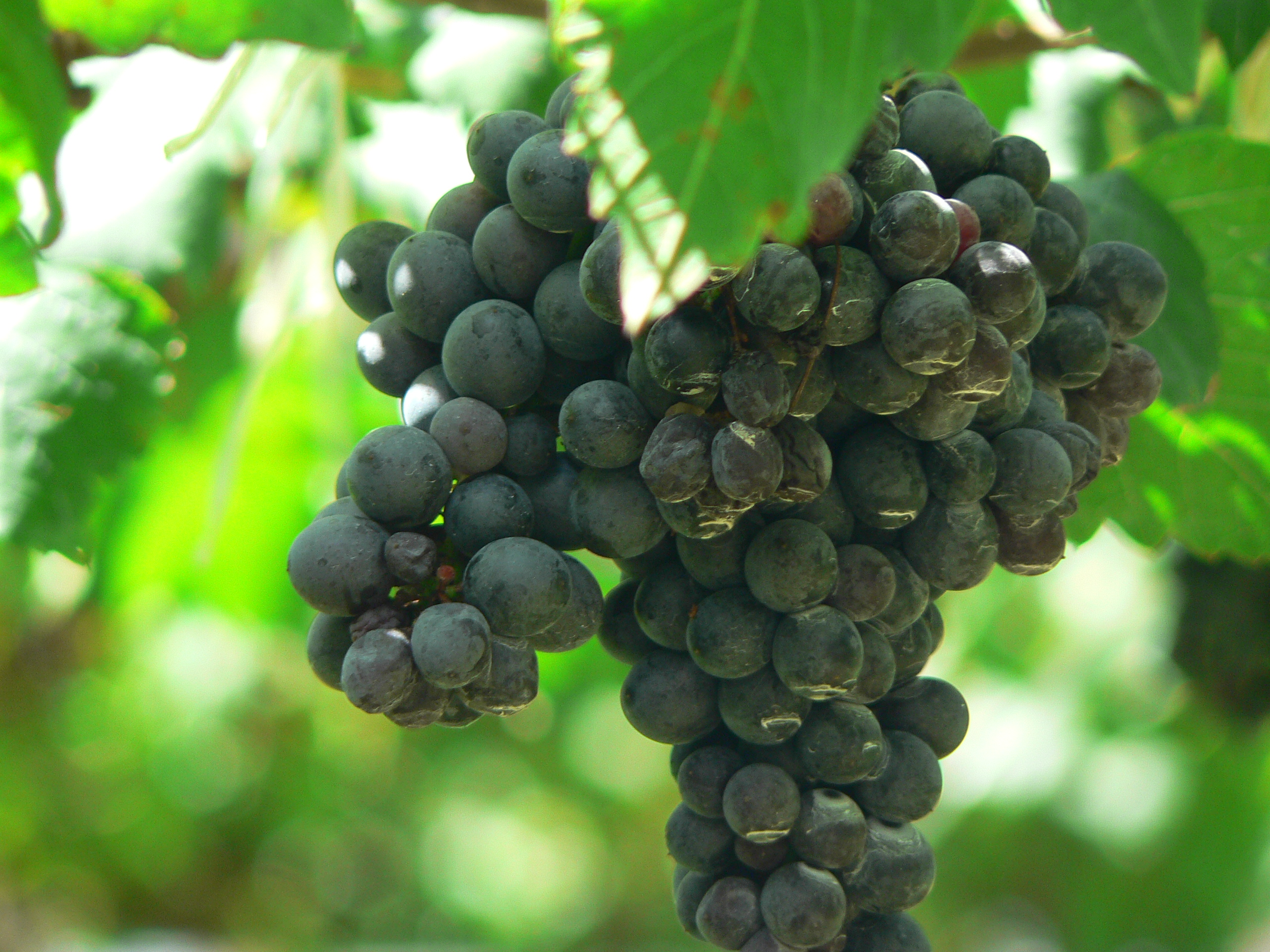
Syrah is a principal grape in many Languedoc red blends

The Languedoc-Roussillon area is home to numerous grape varieties, including many international varieties like Merlot, Cabernet Sauvignon, Sauvignon blanc, and Chardonnay. The traditional Rhône grapes of Mourvedre, Grenache, Syrah, and Viognier are also prominent.

Chardonnay is a major white grape, used in the Vin de Pays d'Oc and the sparkling Crémant de Limoux. Others include Chenin blanc and Mauzac, which is also the principal grape in the sparkling Blanquette de Limoux. The sweet fortified wines of the Muscat de Frontignan and Muscat de St-Jean Minervois regions are made with the Muscat Blanc à Petits Grains grapes. In the Muscat de Rivesaltes AOC, fortified wines are made from Muscat of Alexandria grapes.

Among the reds, Grenache, Syrah, Carignan, Cinsault, and Mourvedre are major grapes of the Corbières, Faugères, Fitou, and Minervois AOCs. Cinsault is also commonly used in rosé production along with Lladoner Pelut, Piquepoul noir, Terret noir, and Grenache. Grenache is also the main grape used in the fortified wines of the Banyuls and Rivesaltes region. Some of the oldest vines in France are Carignan grapes. Winemakers often use carbonic maceration to soften the tannins.

Other varieties that can be found include Roussanne, Marsanne, Vermentino, Bourboulenc, Clairette blanche, Grenache blanc, Grenache gris, Piquepoul blanc, Piquepoul gris, and Macabeo.

== Wines and taxonomy ==
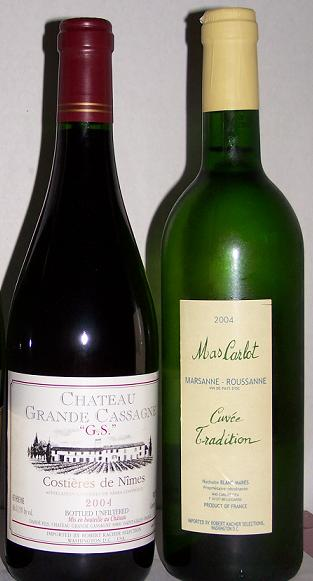
Two wines from the Languedoc. The bottle on the left is an AOC classification wine from the Costières de Nîmes and the bottle on the right is a Vins de Pays labeled with the grapes used to produce the wine

Wines from the Languedoc can carry an enormous number of names, ranging from broad regional designations like Vin de Pays d'Oc to very specific geographical classifications with restrictions on grape variety, like Corbières and Minervois. Since the 1990s, the INAO has been creating smaller AOC classifications which take into account the intricate microclimates and soil variations in the Languedoc-Roussillon. Younger appellations like the Cabardes and subregions like Minervois la Livinière, Corbières-Boutenac and St-Chinian-Berlou are much narrower in scope. While these new appellations have been praised for consistently improving their product, others have criticized the additions for further complicating an already esoteric system of classification.

The majority of wine produced in the Languedoc are labeled vin ordinaire. There is also sizable production of Vins Doux Naturels.

=== Vins de Pays ===
The introduction of the vins de pays, a classification produced under less stringent regulations than those of an AOC, opened up the Languedoc wine industry to the labeling of varietal wines and the blending of international varieties such as Cabernet Sauvignon, Merlot, Syrah and Chardonnay. Examples include Vin de pays d'Oc, Vin de pays d'Aude, Vin de pays de l'Hérault, and Vin de Pays du Gard. Winemakers such as Guy Anderson, Thierry Boudinaud and E. & J. Gallo Winery capitalized on this new horizon, producing wines like Fat Bastard and Red Bicyclette.

=== Vins Doux Naturels ===
Vins Doux Naturels are "naturally sweet" wines that have been fortified with brandy to stop fermentation, leaving residual sugar to add sweetness to the wine. The majority of Languedoc sweet white wines are made with a variety of Muscat grapes. The red fortified wines of the Banyuls are made from Grenache grapes, normally have an alcohol level between 16 and 17% and carry residual sugars in the 8 to 12% range.

In Banyuls, winemakers use various methods to "bake" their wines to encourage deep raisin colors. Some winemakers utilize a solera system of transporting the wine among different size barrels of various ages that are left out in the sun to warm. Others will put the wine in large glass jars to expose it to direct sunlight. In addition to the dark color, the resulting wines often have a nutty, rancid taste called rancio. In the Banyuls Grand Cru AOC the wine is required to be aged in wood barrels for two and a half years.

=== Crémant de Limoux ===
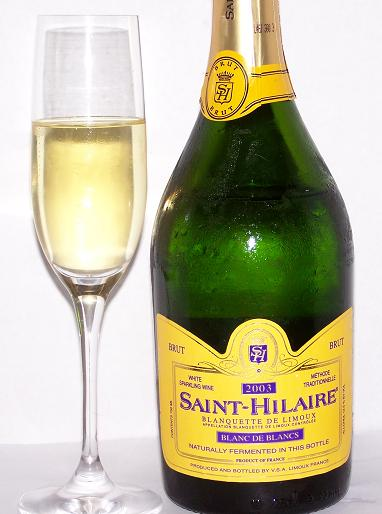
A Blanquette de Limoux from the Languedoc

The crémant produced in the Languedoc is made according to the Méthode Traditionnelle – formerly known as méthode champenoise – the same method used to produce Champagne. Méthode Traditionnelle includes a second fermentation in the bottle to encapture the carbon dioxide produced by the yeast. Languedoc crémant is produced in the small villages around the town of Limoux. The wines are normally composed of 70% Mauzac and a 30% combination of Chardonnay and Chenin blanc. AOC regulations require a year of aging on the lees. The Blanquette de Limoux, when labelled méthode ancestrale, is composed entirely of Mauzac, undergoes only one fermentation, and is aged approximately three months less on the lees before the bottling, the actual date being determined by the moon's cycle.

== See also ==
- Wine label
