= List of Portuguese wine grape varieties =

Portugal's history of viticulture and vinification covers many centuries and has included the use of an extensive number native varieties. In addition, through experimentation and field trials a number of new varieties have emerged and are now playing key roles in producing the country's wide array of wines.

The relative absence of many international varieties such as Cabernet Sauvignon, Chardonnay and Semillon is another characteristic of this country's wine industry, although in recent decades many of these varieties have been brought into wider use as the lists below reveal.

Portugal's wine production in 2019 was 6.5 million hectolitres (Mhl), consistent with its annual average since 2015, and the forecast for 2020 is also 6.5 Mhl. This industry makes an important contribution to the country's annual income by attracting a vigorous local market and by being exported all over the world with France, the United States, (Note: One source says, "The USA is the world's largest wine market, with the largest population of regular wine drinkers and the largest amount of imported wine (by value). The still wine market is around 360 million cases per annum and is forecast to grow to approximately 368 million cases by 2023.") the United Kingdom, Brazil and Germany as the main destinations. Evidence gained from recent research may suggest that the industry has not yet reached its maximum level of winegrape output efficiency. (Note: Conducted in the Douro region, the report includes the following summary of findings: "The results show that some farmers' vineyards have a low efficiency level and that there are essential determinants of the production system, which can influence its efficiency. This suggests considerable opportunities for improvement of wine grape productivity through better use of available resources considering the state of technology.")

Among other wine exporting nations, Portugal was ranked as the world's 9th largest in 2018-2019. (Note: Portugal's total wine exports for 2018-2019 were worth US$919,737,000 as of the date of the report, constituting 2.5% of the total world exports. In the list of the world's largest wine exporters, Portugal was ranked in order behind France, Italy, Spain, Australia, Chile, the United States, New Zealand and Germany.)

== Identifying a variety - the problem with homonyms and synonyms ==
Wine grape varieties are usually known by what is called the "prime name", and it is under this name they are listed in official and academic documents such as the Vitis International Variety Catalogue (VIVC) and Kym Anderson et al.'s Which Winegrape is Grown Where?: A Global Empirical Picture.

Sometimes in a particular country, a variety may have a prime name which is different from its prime name in the international context. For example, the variety called Tempranillo or Tempranillo Tinto internationally is officially listed in Portugal as Aragonez, and is also known in different regions as Tinta Roriz or Aragonês.

Along with the prime name, the other names, that is homonyms and synonyms, by which each variety is known are also included in the lists below. (Note: The relevance of prime names and synonyms to wine labelling is explored in an article by Australian economist and educationist, Professor Eddie Oczkowski. Oczkowski is Professor of Applied Economics and Quantitative Methods in the Faculty of Business, Justice and Behavioural Sciences, based in the Wagga Wagga Campus of Australia's Charles Sturt University. His field of expertise is applied econometrics with an emphasis on wine pricing, limited dependent variables, modelling markets for agricultural products and structural equation modelling applications to marketing and management. One of his major developments was the Australian Wine Price Calculator, a tool for identifying under- and over- priced wines for consumers.) These homonyms and synonyms indicate how many of the wine grape varieties grown in Portugal are known by more than one name both within the country itself and internationally. For example, the synonyms for Tinta Caiada (also called Tinta Lameira in Portugal, and known elsewhere by its Spanish name, Parraleta), listed by country of origin, are:

Bonvedro, False Carignan (Australia); Espagnin Noir (France); Bastardão, Bonvedro, Bomvedro, Lambrusco de Alentejo, Monvedro, Monvedro do Algarve, Monvedro de Sines, Murteira, Olho Branco, Pau Ferro, Perrel, Preto Foz, Preto João Mendes, Tinta Caiada, Tinta Grossa, Tinta Lameira, Tintorro, Torres de Algarve (Portugal); Bonifaccencu, Bonifacienco, Carenisca, Caricagiola (Sardinia); Bastardo, Cua Tendra, Parraleta, Parrel, Salceño Negro (Spain).

In an international context, some varieties have more than 200 or 300 homonyms or synonyms: over 250 for Chasselas Blanc, about 300 for Pinot Noir, and close to 350 for Moscatel Galego Branco.

Often homonyms or synonyms of a particular variety are a direct translation from one language or dialect to another. Pinot Blanc, for example, originated from France and therefore its prime name is in French, but in Italian it is called Pinot Bianco (bianco = white) and Pinot Bijeli (bijeli = white) in Croatian and languages or dialects related to Serbo-Croatian. Sometimes, when a variety originated from a particular place or has been grown there for a long time, it can be given a local name that reflects that association. Arinto, for example, has among its synonyms Arinto d'Anadia, Arinto de Bucelas, Arinto do Dão and Arinto do Douro as well as Asal Espanhol, Pé de Perdiz Branco and Terrantez de Terceira. (Note: In this revealing essay, the author explores the consequences of a variety having more than one name. A number of varieties discussed here are being grown in Portugal.)

Further confusion has arisen when a particular homonym or synonym has been given to more than one variety. Espadeiro, for example, is the prime name for a variety; but as Wein-Plus warns, "It must not be confused with Camaraou Noir, Manseng Noir (Note: Manseng Noir is now officially listed in CAN as Espadeiro Mole.) (both from France), Padeiro, Trincadeira Preta or Vinhão (all five with the synonym Espadeiro), despite the fact that they seem to share synonyms or have morphological similarities.

Probably the greatest confusion of identity has come about through misidentification, (Note: This report from Wine Australia shows how Gros Manseng was misidentified there as Petit Manseng.) misnaming, (Note: In this report, the authors explain why vines growing in different parts of Georgia were being identified as the same variety and the process by which they were finally found to be distinctly different varieties.) or mislabelling. (Note: Mislabelling can occur for many reasons including the grower's or winemaker's confusion about the identity of the grapes used in a wine's production. There are also cases where this has been carried out deliberately and has led to criminal charges being laid against the perpetrators. This news report focuses on such an event in France.) Some growers, for example, have found themselves with vines for which they have no formal identification and have based their decision on observation or even guesswork; so if the vine, grape or seasonal behaviour is similar to that of another variety, it is not surprising that the variety is given an incorrect name. The occurrence of mislabelling was also frequent in the past, especially when the gathering and exchanging of cuttings were carried out informally and without some form of control. New legislation and strict administration have reduced but not eliminated this risk.

== Ampelography and the establishment of the National Ampelographic Collection ==
A major step in mapping and conserving Portugal's unique grape profile was the establishment in 1988 of the Coleção Ampelográfica Nacional (National Ampelographic Collection or CAN), a germplasm bank containing as many of the country's unique native varieties as have been found so far along with those varieties that have been introduced from elsewhere. The collection is located at the Instituto Nacional de Investigação Agrária e Veterinária, I.P. (National Institute for Agricultural and Veterinary Research or INIAV) in Dois Portos, and has been described as the "national reference collection" and "in addition to its preservation aspect, also has pedagogical functions and supports national and international research."

Another of its functions was, as Eiras-Dias wrote, "to solve the problems of synonymy and homonymy spread over the different wine regions." The extent of this problem and its many causes have already been discussed above. Other examples given by Eiras-Dias are " Castelão (vs. Periquita, vs. Trincadeiro, vs. João de Santarém, vs. Castelão Francês) or Fernão Pires (vs. Maria Gomes)" with debate about the standardisation of their identity causing hot debate in the early 1980s. In his words, the widespread nature of this problem to confusion which, in turn, "had very negative effects on the knowledge and management of the rich viticultural heritage of the country."

Steps that led to the founding of CAN began in 1981 with the setting up of the Projecto Nacional de Ampelografia e Sinonímia das Variedades de Videira (National Ampelographic and Synonymous Grapevine Varieties Project or PNASVV). This just predated Portugal's accession to the European Economic Community (a precursor of the European Union (EU) into which on its establishment, EEC was absorbed) and was motivated by a need to be able to operate efficiently within the broader European context. Between PNASVV's formation and the establishment of CAN, a number of regional-based ampelographic projects began, and by the time the national collection was operating, the role and value of ampelography in the wine industry had been established. The integration of CAN with the government's legislative and administrative involvement in the wine industry was shown when CAN's listing became the core of the government's 2000 ordinance list and later revisions including the 2017 "Catálogo Nacional de Variedades de Videira" (National Catalogue of Vine Varieties or NCVV). New information from CAN continues to be provided to the government for the updating of its list, to VIVC and to the EU's certification body, the European Commission (EC).

== Scientific research and the establishment of identity ==
In recent years, genetic testing, DNA profiling and genomics have played a major role in establishing the identity and parentage of grape varieties. Especially Jorge Böhm has to be named when it comes to the scientific research of Portuguese grape varieties, since he's well known for his success in improving most of the native varieties by mutating new clones with his own plant nursery. But the availability of these services has been limited and largely concentrated on those varieties playing key roles in wine production. This means there is still much work to be done, leaving many varieties still clouded in mystery, and if they are varieties which have passed out of use, it seems unlikely their identities will ever be investigated.

One groundbreaking Portuguese research program carried out in the Douro-Porto regions was set up:

"…to compare the effectiveness of RAPD (Random Amplified Polymorphic DNA) and ISSR (Inter Simple Sequence Repeat) molecular techniques in the detection of synonyms, homonyms and misnames. RAPD and ISSR analysis enabled the detection of 36 different band patterns, reducing in about 36% the original material. Several accessions grown under different names, between and within collections, were confirmed as the same genotype, namely Gouveio/Verdelho, Sousão Douro/Vinhão and Arinto Oeste/ Pedernã. Similarly, some homonyms/misnames were also identified, namely within Azal Tinto and Rabigato accessions. RAPD and ISSR markers revealed to be adequate molecular techniques for grapevine varieties fingerprinting with advantages over other molecular procedures, contributing for a good management of grapevine collections."

The findings from this research illustrated why it has become necessary to sort out the confusion that has been caused and sustained by the use of false and misleading synonyms and homonyms. Regarding, for example, the problem with identifying Sousão (now officially known as Sezão) and Vinhão, the report said:

"Results highlight the genetic proximity between Sousão and Vinhão accessions. Sousão is the prime name of a cultivar grown especially in ‘Vinhos Verdes' Region whose cultivar designation was modified to Sezão in the last review of the ‘Portuguese List of Varieties fit for Wine Production'. Vinhão has been reported as the synonym of the Spanish cultivar Sousón. However, a focus of confusion exists in Douro Region, where, frequently, the name Sousão it given to the cultivar Vinhão. Though, the observed separated RAPD clusters for Sousão and Vinhão groups are correct, nevertheless, the fact that these accessions have a miscellany of names between the two RAPD clusters and that they cluster together in the ISSR marker analysis, suggest that Sousão and Vinhão accessions are genetically close."

Further gains for the identification of varieties have been achieved through the use of microsatellites. Programs have been conducted in several regions. One of the most interesting involved a review in 2010 of 313 accessions planted at that time on CAN's own site. All of these had been authorised for commercial wine production. Of these, the researchers were able to confirm 244 as distinct genotypes, leaving 69 for further classification. Of these, 40 were subdivided into 17 distinct genotype groups each defined by shared synonyms. The largest groups was made up of Ramisco Tinto, Rabo de Ovelha Tinto, Saborinho, Molar, Tinto de Porto Santo and Tinta Negra with each of these registered at that time under two to six synonyms. In some cases, when varieties had different berry colours but shared the same Simple Sequence Repeat DNA marker) profiles (SSR), it was taken that one was a mutation of the other and they were listed together. So, for example, Fernão Pires has green-yellow berries (B) and Fernão Pires Rosado has rose berries (Rs) and Fernão Pires Rosado has rose berries (Rs), but they have the same SSR profiles and Fernão Pires Rosado is listed as a colour mutation of Fernão Pires. As the researchers said in their report:

"Traditionally, cultivar characterization relied on plant morphological description. However, these observations are time consuming and error-prone due to environmental variations that may alter the expression of the measured characteristics. In the last years, developments in DNA analysis for the discrimination of cultivars through the application of the microsatellite (SSR) fingerprinting in viticulture has become the technique of choice for cultivar identification and distinction."

Another research program carried out prior to 2015 involved the use of microsatellites and SSR profiling set out to survey and correctly identify 39 less-known cultivars in the Vinhos Verdes region. As the research report says:

"The accessions analyzed were identified and grouped into 34 different genotypes, nine of them referred as new genotypes. Some new synonyms were detected, namely between Spanish and Portuguese cultivars. Misidentifications and wrong designations were also detected." (p. 53) (The nine new genotype cultivars have been added to the lists below. )

Taking into account this reports closing paragraph, the findings of this research offer outcomes as significant for the Vinhos Verdes region as they could be for the country's entire wine industry:

"Besides the genetic interest in the correct identification and preservation of these autochthonous and minor cultivars in order to prevent their extinction and maintain the biodiversity of Vinhos Verdes DOC Region, they could also be restored and introduced on the production of new and original wines."(p. 57)

Investigating the origin and identity of Portugal's native vines was built on the theory that those cultivars of Vitis vinifera L. ssp.vinifera, which had originated from the eastern part of the Mediterranean and been brought west by Phoenician, Greek and Roman settlers, had crossed with a pre-existing generation of wild vines from the Vitis vinifera L. ssp. sylvestris population which had either originated on the Iberian peninsula or had survived there during the last glacial period which ended approximately 11,700 years ago. Ssp. sylvestris, with common names like videira brava, videira silvestre or parreira brava, still survive in the Alentejo, Beiras and Dão forests and elsewhere on the Iberian peninsula. Various research programs made use of microsatellites along with morphological and SSR analyses and their findings are outlined in various reports, the most detailed being from Cunha et al. who concluded by saying:,

"The relationships revealed between local wild-vines and local grapevine cultivars further stresses the importance of protecting the populations were this important repository of genetic variability exists, not only from a biodiversity point of view but also as a source of traits potentially useful to viticulture and oenology."

As much as Portugal has progressed in correctly identifying and indexing its grape varieties, the need for much more work remains. As Cunha and his colleagues wrote:

"Normally, the winegrower is averse to the unknown in his vineyards. Either you know the true name of a grape variety or, simply, rename it, originating the existence of several names to designate a variety (synonymy) and the same name to identify different varieties (homonymy). This problem, common to all wine-growing countries, requires the adoption of an official nomenclature in which each grape variety is identified by a unique name. Exceptionally, and when justified by expressive traditions, a recognized synonym can be admitted, with an intended use equivalent."

== Government legislation and an official list of names ==
As already indicated, in 2010, having foreseen the need for regulation, the Portuguese Government through its then-titled issued an ordinance governing the list of grape varieties that could be used in the wine industry. Subsequent revisions followed.

In 2017, incorporating new information which had come from CAN and other sources, the government issued a comprehensive document the title "Catálogo Nacional de Variedades de Videira" (National Catalogue of Vine Varieties or NCVV). Each was shown in the catalogue under the prime name by which it is required to be known within the country's commercial wine production and distribution. The right to add new varieties to the list was placed in the hands of the Instituto da Vinha e do Vinho, IP (Institute of Vine and Wine or IVV), a division of the now-called Ministério da Agricultura (Ministry of Agriculture).

Of the 343 varieties on that list, 230 were native to Portugal or the Iberian Peninsula. But as Cunha and his colleagues warned, "There are still dozens of unidentified grape varieties in the collection (unknown), collected in vineyards subject to final grubbing up and/or for restructuring throughout the country, currently being the object of identity and definition of the strategy for its preservation." The use of genome typing for the standardising of the prime names of Portugal's grape variety list was the primary goal of Cunha and his team, and their findings are contained in that report. According to the 2010 report by Veloso et al.,

"Less than 15 native cultivars represent the majority of those presently utilised for viticulture, namely Alvarinho, Antão Vaz, Arinto, Fernão Pires, for the green-yellow cultivars (25,800 ha) and Baga, Castelão, Tinta Barroca, Tinto Cão, Touriga Franca, Touriga Nacional and Trincadeira (= Trincadeira Preta), for the blue-black cultivars (73,630 ha)."

== Portugal's wine appellations ==
Portugal's wine appellation system classifies wines in three ways, Denominação de Origem Controlada (Controlled Denomination of Origin or DOC), Indicação de Proveniência Regulamentada (Indication of Regulated Provenance or IPR), and Vinho Regional (Regional Wine or VR).

The highest classification is Denominação de Origem Controlada. Under its operation, strict regulations: (1) designate the region or DOC from which a particular wine originates; (2) govern the grape varieties or castas which, having been officially listed for that region, can be used to make a wine whose label will include that region's DOC stamp; (3) protect the producers within a region from others elsewhere making false claims of origin; and (4) set the standards for each product which must be met by its producer. (Note: As indicated, the DOC system also protects the origin and quality of other products including cheeses, butters, meats, breads, fruits and vegetables.)

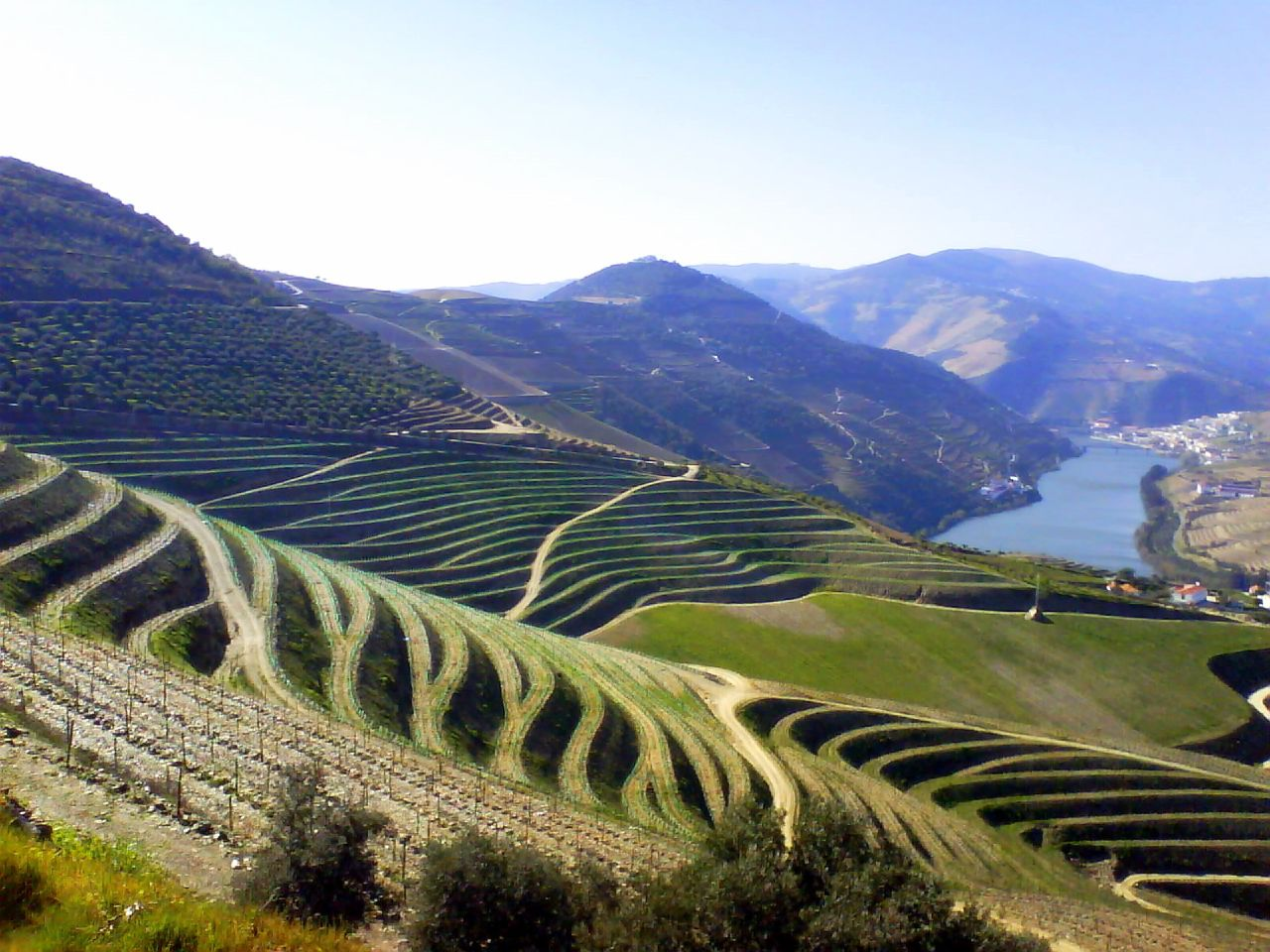
Vineyards in the Douro Valley with the wine town of Pinhão in the distance. Being defined in 1756 by Royal Charter as a port wine producing region makes Douro DOC the world's oldest demarcated wine zone. Located upstream from Oporto on the Douro River and its tributaries, evidence shows that wine was produced in the region as early as the 4th and 3rd centuries BCE and that grapes had been grown there in prehistoric times. (Note: Cunha et al. say, "The oldest archeological remains of grapevine seeds in Portugal date back from the Chalcolithic (circa 3350–2250 BCE).")

Each DOC region has its own regulating body which performs these tasks and to which producers are required to submit for annual assessment samples of all their wines carrying the DOC stamp. Therefore, for example, wines produced under these regulations by Douro DOC will have on the label the words "Douro DOC" or "Douro Denominação de Origem Controlada" and this appellation conveys to the market a guarantee that the wine has been produced according to that region's standards.

For various reasons, a DOC may enter into decline and as a result may be merged with another DOC. Examples include the former Borba, Portalegre, Redondo, Reguengos and Vidigueira DOCs which are now subregions of Alentejo DOC.

From 1990, smaller regions or sub-regions within DOCs used to label their wines under a classification called Indicação de Proveniência Regulamentada (Indication of Regulated Provenance or IPR) or VQPRD (Vinho De Qualidade Produzido Em Região Demarcada or Quality Wine Produced in a Demarcated Region) and either IPR or VQPRD. These regions set up their own internal regulating bodies similar to these operating in DOCs, and often their plan was to develop their own identity and quality of output to an extent that would lead, in turn, to their being recognised as a DOC.

The third appellation is Vinho Regional (Regional Wine). As Wines of Portugal points out:

"Rules for making Vinho Regional are much less stringent than those that govern DOC wines. Nevertheless, many prestigious Portuguese wines are classified as Vinho Regional. This is often because the producer has chosen to use grape varieties that are not permitted for the local DOC, or at least not in those particular combinations or proportions. The looser regulations for Vinho Regional give producers greater scope for individuality, although these wines still have to fulfil certain criteria regarding grape variety, minimum alcohol content and so on."

As it happens, the DOC and VR systems can and do operate side by side in relation to specific regions. Therefore, the Alentejo region has Alentejo DOC and Alentejano VR designations, while in the Douro region there are Douro DOC and Duriense VR designations. Therefore, a variety may appear on different levels of listing, that is to say on both the DOC and VR lists because this allows for that variety to be used in different ways. In turn, this would govern the type of stamp the producer can use on the label of a specific wine.

Portugal's base category of wines was once known as vinho de mesa (table wine) but these days is more often called simply vinho or vinho de Portugal. These may be produced using grape juice from anywhere in the country or from elsewhere, there is not the same level of control on standards as applied in DOC and VR wines, and the label usually only carries the producer's name, either the product's name or the grape varieties used in it and the words "Product of Portugal".

== European Union wine appellations ==
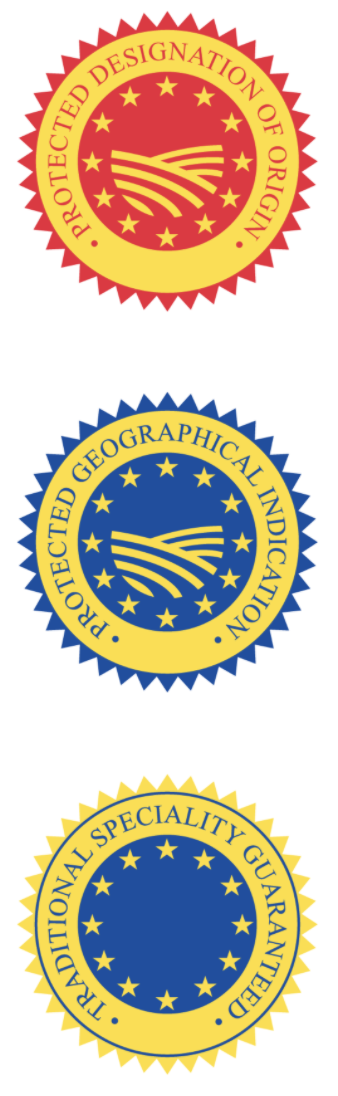
European Union's Geographical Indications logos

Geographical Indication or the association of a product with a specific place or region has had a long history at a national level in Europe. In 1992 the EU formalised this process under its own regulations with a certification process to be administered by the EC.

In devising its certification regulations, EU modelled it on Portugal's DOC system, France's Appellation d'origine contrôlée (Controlled Designation of Origin or AOC), Italy's Denominazione di origine controllata (Controlled Designation of Origin or DOC), Spain's Denominación de origen (Denomination of Origin or DO), and those of other EU members. As with Portugal and each other wine-producing member of the EU, internal systems operate in parallel with EU's, and those varieties that appear on internal lists also appear on the equivalent EU lists.

Under EU's regulations, there are three categories of certification which are explained as follows:

1. "Protected Designation of Origin" (PDO) – "Product names registered as PDO are those that have the strongest links to the place in which they are made.";
2. "Protected Geographical Indication" (PGI) – "PGI emphasises the relationship between the specific geographic region and the name of the product, where a particular quality, reputation or other characteristic is essentially attributable to its geographical origin", and "Geographical Indication" of spirit drinks and aromatised wines" (GI) – "The GI protects the name of a spirit drink or aromatised wine originating in a country, region or locality where the product's particular quality, reputation or other characteristic is essentially attributable to its geographical origin.";
3. "Traditional Specialities Guaranteed" (TSG) – "Traditional speciality guaranteed (TSG) highlights the traditional aspects such as the way the product is made or its composition, without being linked to a specific geographical area. The name of a product being registered as a TSG protects it against falsification and misuse."

Each of the categories is represented by a stamp and when appellation has been authorised under EU's regulations, wine producers are entitled to show the appropriate stamp on their labelling. Regarding Portugal's wine industry, reports say that the majority of producers are continuing to use only the country's own internal appellation categories on their labels.

Because Portugal's Instituto da Vinha e do Vinho, IP (Institute of Vine and Wine or IVV), which operates under the supervision of the currently-called Ministério da Agricultura (Ministry of Agriculture), uses only EU's appellation terminology, the tables below are set up in the same way except where alternatives are necessary.

== Lists of wine grape varieties ==
For an explanation of techniques used for the investigation of a variety's genetic structure and the determination of its pedigree, see Myles, et al. "Genetic structure and domestication history of the grape."

=== Red varieties ===
Abbreviations

- CAN - Coleção Ampelográfica Nacional (National Ampelographic Collection)
- Color of Berry Skin - N (noir - black), Rg (rouge - red), Rs (rose - pale red or pink), Gr (gris - gray or greyish - blue)
- FPS - Foundation Plant Service Grape Registry
- ha - hectare, a measurement of land area
- NCVV - Catálogo Nacional de Variedades de Videira (National Catalogue of Vine Varieties)
- VIVC - Vitis International Variety Catalogue
- WPL - Wein.Plus Lexicon

| Grape | NCVV Ref No | VIVC Ref No | Color of Berry Skin | Pedigree | Region | International Homonyms and Synonyms | |
| Agronómica | 41505 | 120 | N | Unknown | Rare (Note: VIVC records there being 19.08 ha planted in Portugal in 1999. According to Robinson et al., by 2010 the total area is 320 ha, and made specific mention of its authorization for use in PGI Açores and that it is being used as a blend in the making of table wine on Pico. WPL cites a source saying the total planting in 2016 was 299 ha.) | | |
| Água Santa | 50615 | 123 | N | Camarate x Castelão | Beira Atlântico PGI, Terras do Dão PGI (Note: Robinson et al. say this variety is found "mainly in the Bairrada and Lisboa regions.") | | |
| Ahmeur Bou Ahmeur (See Ferral) | | | | | | | |
| Alcoa (See Tinta de Alcobaça) | | | | | | | |
| Alentejana (See Fepiro) | | | | | | | |
| Alfrocheiro Preto | 52003 | As Alfrocheiro - 277 | N | Savagnin Blanc = Traminer x ? | Alentejo PDO, Bairrada PDO, Beira Atlântico PGI, DoTejo PDO, Lisboa PGI, Lisboa-Alta-Estremadura PGI, Lisboa-Encostas d'Aire PDO, Lisboa-Estremadura PGI, Minho PGI, Península de Setúbal PGI, Tejo PGI, Terras do Dão PGI (Note: Robinson et al. reported the total planting in 2010 as 1,492 ha. which, according to WPL's source had increased to 1,860 ha by 2016. It is not surprising, then, to read this opinion: "This cultivar and their progenies represent about 15% of the total grapevine acreage in Portugal, stressing the importance of 'Alfrocheiro' in the Portuguese wine character.") | Albarín Frances, Albarín Negrin, Albarín Negro, Albarín Tinto, Albarinon, Alfrucheiro, Alfurcheiro, Alphorcheira Preto, Baboso Negro, Baboso Tinto, Bastardo, Bastardo negro, Bruñal, Budelho, Caino Tinto, Negrona, Tinta Basta, Tinta Francesa de Basta, Viseu, Tinta Francisca de Viseu, Tinto Serodo | |
| Alicante Henri Bouschet | | 304 | N | Grenache = Garnacha Tinta x Bouschet Petit | Alentejo PDO, Algarve-Tavira PDO, Beira Atlântico PGI, DoTejo PDO, Douro PDO, Lagoa PDO, Lagos PDO, Lisboa PGI, Lisboa-Alenquer PDO, Lisboa-Alta-Estremadura PGI, Lisboa-Arruda PDO, Lisboa-Encostas d'Aire PDO, Lisboa-Estremadura PGI, Lisboa-Óbidos PDO, Lisboa-Torres Vedras PDO, Minho PGI, Palmela PDO, Península de Setúbal PGI, Portimão PDO, Tavira PDO Tejo PGI, Terras do Dão PGI, Transmontano PGI, Trás-os-Montes PDO, Trás-os-Montes-Chaves PDO, Trás-os-Montes-Planalto Mirandês PDO (Note: Robinson et al . noted Portugal's planting in 2010 as 2,203 ha) | Alicant de Pays, Alicante, Alicante Bouchet, Alicante Bouschet 2, Alicante Bouschet Crni, Alicante Enrico Boushet, Alicante Extra Fertile, Alicante Femminello, Alicante H. Bouschet, Alicante Nero, Alicante Noir, Alicante Tinto, Alicantina, Alikant, Alikant Buse, Alikant Buse Bojadiser, Alikant Bushe, Alikant Bushe Ekstrafertil, Alikant Bushe Nr 2, Alikant Genri Bushe, Alikant Henri Bouschet, Aragonais, Aragones, Arrenaou, Baga, Bakir Uezuemue, Barvarica, Blasco, Bojadiserka, Carignan Jaune, Colore, Cupperink Grape Grape Garnacha, Garnacha Tintorera, Kambuša, Lhadoner, Likant, Likavit, Moraton, Mouraton, Murviedro, Negral, Pé de Perdiz, Pé de Pombo, Petit Bouschet, Redondal, Rikant, Rivesaltes, Rivos Altos, Rousillon, Rouvaillard, Sumo Tinto, Tinto, Tinto Nero, Tinto Velasco, Tintorera, Tintorero de Liria, Tintorera de Longares, Tintoria | |
| Alicante Tinto (See Alicante Henri Bouschet ) | | | | | | | |
| Alvar Roxo | | 377 | Rs | Unknown | Beira Atlântico PGI, | | |
| Alvarelhão | 53207 | 1650 | N | Unknown | Beira Atlântico PGI, Douro PDO, Minho PGI, Península de Setúbal PGI, Terras do Dão PGI, Transmontano PGI, Vinho Verde PDO, Vinho Verde - Baião PDO (Note: Robinson et al. say, "It has been a victim of changes in consumer preferences and total Portuguese plantings were just 67 ha (166 acres) by 2010, although there has been recent renewed interest for the production of rosé.”) | Albarello, Alvarelhão, Alvarelhão de Pé Branco, Alvarelhão de Vara Branca, Alvarelho, Alvarellão, Alvarello, Alvarello Gallego, Alvarelo, Alvarelyo, Alvarilhão, Brancelhão, Brancelho, Brancellão, Brancellão Tinto, Brancello, Pilongo (This is also a variety in its own right), Pirrauvo, Pirruivo, Serradelo, Serradillo, Uva Gallega, Uva Negra, Varancelha, Verancelha | |
| Alvarelhão Ceitão | 41209 | 368 | N | Hebén = Mourisco Branco x Alvarelhão | Douro PDO, Península de Setúbal PGI, | Alvello Grosso, Brancallao, Brancelho, Cabritella, Castelão, Castella, Castellão, Tinta Castelan, Tinta Castella, Tinta Castellan, Tinta Castellão, Tinta Castellão, Tinta de Castella | |
| Alvarelhão de Pé Vermelho | | 20757 | Rg | Unknown | Unknown | Alvarelhão Pé de Perdez, Alvarelhão Pied de Perdix | |
| Amaral | 52908 | 818 | N | Unknown | Minho PGI, Península de Setúbal PGI, Terras do Dão PGI, Vinho Verde PDO, Vinho Verde - Amarante PDO, Vinho Verde - Ave PDO, Vinho Verde - Baião PDO, Vinho Verde - Basto PDO, Vinho Verde - Cávado PDO, Vinho Verde - Paiva PDO, Vinho Verde - Sousa PDO (Note: Robinson et al. reported the 2010 planting as 123 ha, although Anderson et al. had seen reports of only 92 ha.) | Amaral Preto, Arinto, Azal Tinto, Azar, Azal Preto, Cachón, Cainho Bravo, Cainho Miúdo, Caíño, Caíño Bravo, Caíño Tinto, Cainzinho, Sousão, Sousão Galego | |
| Amaral de Baião | | 25080 | N | Unknown | Rare (Note: This variety was discovered in the former parish of Santa Marinha de Zêzere in the municipality of Baião in the Vinhos Verdes region. (p.55)) | | |
| Amor-Não-Me-Deixes | 51003 | As Aramon Noir - 544 | N | Ouliven x Gouais Blanc = Heunisch Weiß = Branco Valente | Douro PDO, Península de Setúbal PGI, Transmontano PGI | Amor-Não-Me-Deixes, Aramon, Aramon Chernyi, Aramon Crni, Aramon Negro, Aramon Noir, Aramon Pignat, Aramon Pigne, Aramon Rozovyi, Aramon Saint Joseph, Aramon-Teinturier, Aramone, Aramonen, Aramont, Arramont, Bouschet, Bouschet de Bernard, Bouschet Petit, Burchardt's Prince, Burckarti Prinz, Burkhardt, Eramoul, Eromoul, Gros Bouteillan, Kek Aramon, Le Bouschet, Petit Bouchet, Petit Bouschet, Petit Bouse, Pisse-Vin, Plante Riche, Pit Bushe, Rabalairé, Ramonen, Réballaïré, Reballayre, Revalaire, Tintinha, Ugni Neru, Ugni Nevu, Ugni noir, Uni Negre, Uni Noir | |
| Amostrinha (See also Preto Martinho) | 53204 | 7451 | N | Unknown | DoTejo PDO, Douro PDO, Lisboa PGI, Lisboa - Alenquer PDO, Lisboa - Alta-Estremadura PGI, Lisboa - Carcavelos PDO, Lisboa - Encostas d'Aire PDO, Lisboa-Estremadura PGI, Lisboa - Óbidos PDO, Península de Setúbal PGI, Tejo PGI | Amostrinha Noir, Preto Martinho, Preto Martinho Aveiras, Preto Martinho do Oeste, Preto Martinho Ribatejo | |
| Aragonez | 52603 | As Tempranillo Tinto - 12350 | N | Albillo Mayor x Benedicto | Alentejo PDO, Algarve - Tavira - Ave PDO, Bairrada PDO, Beira Atlântico PGI, DoTejo PDO, Douro PDO, Duriense PGI, Lagoa PDO, Lagos PDO, Lisboa PGI, Lisboa - Alenquer PDO, Lisboa - Alta-Estremadura PGI, Lisboa - Arruda PDO, Lisboa - Encostas d'Aire PDO, Lisboa-Estremadura PGI, Lisboa - Óbidos PDO, Minho PGI, Palmela PDO, Portimão PDO, Porto PDO, Península de Setúbal PGI, Setúbal PDO, Tavira PDO, Tejo PGI, Terras do Dão PGI, Transmontano PGI, Trás-os-Montes - Chaves PDO, Trás-os-Montes - Planalto Mirandês PDO | Albillo Negro, Aldepenas, Aragón, Aragones, Aragonez da Ferra, Aragonez de Elvas, Arauxa, Arganda, Arinto Tinto, Baroccas, Bar, Botón de Gallo, Castellana, Cencibel, Chinchillana, Chinchilyano, Escobera, Genarcha Foño, Grenache de Logrono, Jacibiera, Jacivera, Negra de Mesa, Negretto, Olha de Lebre, Piñuela, Santo Stefano Sensibel, Tempranilla, Tempranillo, Tempranillo de la Rioja, Tempranillo de Perralillo Tempranillo de Rioja, Tempranillo de Rioza, Tempranillo Rioja, Tempranillo Tinta, Tempranillo Tinto, Tinta Aragonez, Tinta de Nava, Tinta del País, Tinta del Toro, Tinta do Inacio, Tinta do País, Tinta Fina, Tinta Madrid, Tinta Roriz, Tinta Santiago, Tinto Aragónez, Tinto de Madrid, Tinto del País, Tinto Fino, Tinto Madrid, Tinto País, Tinto Ribiera, Ull de Llebre, Valdepeñas, Verdiell, Vid de Aranda | |
| Aramon Noir (See Amor-Não-Me-Deixes) | | | | | | | |
| Arinto Tinto (See Aragonez) | | | | | | | |
| Arjunção | 52104 | As Listán Prieto - 6860 | N | Unknown | Península de Setúbal PGI | Almuñeco, California, Commun de las Palmas, Creole Petite, Criola Chica, Criolla, Criolla 6, Criolla Chica, Criolla Peru, El Paso, Forastero Negro, Hariri, Hariri Noir, H'riri, Listán Negra, Listán Prieto, Listán Violet, Listán Viol Rouge, Listrão, Misión, Mission, Mission's Grape, Moscatel Negro, Moscatel Negro du Perou, Negra, Negra Antigua, Negra Commun, Negra Corriente, Negra Corriente ICA, Negra Corriente Majes, Negra Corriente Tacna, Negra Peruana, País, Palomina Negra, Printanier Rouge, Rosa del Perú, Uva Chica Negra, Uva del Pais, Uva Negra, Uva Negra Vino, Uva Pais, Uva Tinta, Viña Blanca, Viña Negra, Zerhoun Noir | |
| Aubun (See Corvo) | | | | | | | |
| Azal tinto (See Amaral) | | | | | | | |
| Baga | 52606 | 885 | N | Malvasia Fina x ? | Alentejo PDO, Bairrada PDO, Beira Atlântico PGI, DoTejo PDO, Douro PDO, Lisboa PGI, Lisboa - Alenquer PDO, Lisboa - Alta-Estremadura PGI, Lisboa - Encostas d'Aire PDO, Lisboa-Estremadura PGI, Lisboa - Óbidos PDO, Minho PGI, Península de Setúbal PGI, Tejo PGI, Terras do Dão PGI, Trás-os-Montes - Chaves PDO | Baga de Louro, Baguinha, Bairrada, Bairrado Tinta, Baya, Carrasquenho, Carrega Burros, Carrego Burros, Gonçalveira, Morete, Moreto, Paga Dividas, Poeirinha, Poeirinho, Povolide, Preiinho, Pretinho, Preto Rifete, Rifete, Rosete, Tinta Bairrada, Tinta Bairradina, Tinta da Bairrada, Tinta de Baga, Tinta Fina | |
| Baga de Louro (See Baga) | | | | | | | |
| Barca (See Tinta da Barca) | | | | | | | |
| Barreto | 41302 | 17655 | N | Mourisco Tinto = Marufo x Gouveio (Note: VIVC lists Gouveio as a variety in its own right whereas WPL lists it only as a synonym for Godello.) | Douro PDO, Península de Setúbal PGI | Barreto de Semente, Bragão, Tinta Bragão, Tinta do Bragão | |
| Barreto da Semente (See Barreto) | | | | | | | |
| Bastardinha, Bastardinho or Tinta Bastardinhna (Note: VIVC lists Bastardinho as a variety in its own right but provides little else except saying that Bastardo is its synonym. It has no listing under Tinta Bastardinha. IVV does not list Bastardinho as a distinct variety and its only mention of Tinta Bastardinha is as a synonym for Alfrocheiro Preto. WPL also says that Tinta Bastardinha is a synonym for Alfrocheiro Preto.) | | | N | Unknown | Unknown | Bastardo | |
| Bastardinho do Porto (Note: VIVC lists this as a variety in its own right but provides little other information. No other references have been located.) | | 40716 | N | Unknown | Unknown | | |
| Bastardo (Note: WPL says that "when only "Bastardo" is mentioned, it is often not clear which grape variety is actually involved: Alfrocheiro (i.e. Bastardo Negro, Bastardo Tinto, Tinta Bastardinha), Bastardo Branco (also Bastardo Branca), Bastardo Magarachsky (also Bastard de Magaraci), Bastardo Roxo - Mutation of Trousseau Noir, Bastartiko - Clone of Promara Castelão Francês (i.e. Bastardo Castico, Bastardo Espanhol), Graciano (i.e. Bastardo Nero), Monvedro (also Bastardão, Bastardo), Parraleta (i.e. Bastardão, Bastardo), Tinta de Lisboa (i.e. B. do Outeiro, B. Espanhol Cova Beira, B. Espanhol Noir, B. Tinto) or Trousseau Noir (i.e. Bastardo, Bastardillo Chico, Bastardinha, Bastardinho)." An amusing but inconclusive investigation of the true identity of Bastardo varieties can be found in an essay entitled "Who ya gonna call? Those bastards!".) | 52803 | As Trousseau Noir - 12688 | N | ? x Savagnin Blanc = Traminer | Bairrada PDO, Beira Atlântico PGI, DoTejo PDO, Douro PDO, Lagos PDO, Lisboa PGI, Lisboa - Alta-Estremadura PGI, Lisboa - Encostas d'Aire PDO, Lisboa-Estremadura PGI, Madeira PDO, Madeirense PDO, Palmela PDO, Porto PDO, Setúbal PDO, Tejo PGI, Terras do Dão PGI, Transmontano PGI, Trás-os-Montes - Chaves PDO, Trás-os-Montes - Planalto Mirandês PDO, Trás-os-Montes - Vàlpaçôs PDO | Abrunhal, Bastardinha, Bastardinho, Bastardo Do Castello, Bastardo dos Frados, Bolonia, Capbreton Rouge, Carnaz, Chauche Noir, Cruchenton Rouge, Donzelino De Castille, Estaladiña, Godello Tinto, Graciosa, Gris De Salces, Gros Cabernet, Maria, Maria Adona, Maria Adorna, Maria Ordoña, María Ordoñez, Maturana Tinta, Maturana Tinto, Maturano, Merenzano, Merenzao, Pardinho, Pecho, Pinot Gris De Rio Negro, Roibal, Sémillon Rouge, Terret d'Afrique, Tinta Lisboa, Tintilla, Tintollo Borgolona, Tresseau (Not to be confused with Tressot), Triffault, Troussé, Trousseau, Trousseau Gris, Trousseau Noir, Troussot, Trusiaux, Trusseau, Trussiau, Verdejo, Verdejo Negro, Verdejo Tinto | |
| Bastardo Espanhol (Note: Under the category "Bastardo", VIVC complicates establishing this grape's identity by listing four with the cultivar name Bastardo Espanhol and two as Bastardo Espanhol Noir. Two of these are paralleled with the prime name Bastardo Espanhol, three with Tinta de Lisboa, and one with Castelão. By contrast, WPL lists Bastardo Espanhol only as a synonym for Castelão Francês and Tinta de Lisboa.) (See also Castelão Francês (= Castelão) and Tinta de Lisboa) | | 25773 | N | Hebén = Mourisco Branco x Trousseau Noir = Bastardo (Note: VIVC lists the established parentage as Hebén x Trousseau Noir = Bastardo.) | Unknown | | |
| Bastardo Tinto (See Bastardo, Tinta de Lisboa and Bastardo Espanhol) | | | | | | | |
| Benfica (See Tintem) | | | | | | | |
| Blue Portuguese (See Português Azul) | | | | | | | |
| Bogalhal | | 25082 | N | Unknown | Rare (Note: This variety was discovered in the former parish of Gagos (the report lists this as "Gagos de Cima") in the municipality of Celorico de Basto in the Vinhos Verdes region. (p.55)) | | |
| Bonvedro or Bomvedro (See Monvedro and Tinta Caiada) | | | | | | | |
| Borraçal | 1564 | 52807 | N | Unknown | Duriense PGI, Minho PGI, Península de Setúbal PGI, Vinho Verde PDO, Vinho Verde - Amarante PDO, Vinho Verde - Ave PDO, Vinho Verde - Baião PDO, Vinho Verde - Basto PDO, Vinho Verde - Cávado PDO, Vinho Verde - Lima PDO, Vinho Verde - Paiva PDO, Vinho Verde - Sousa PDO, (Note: According to VIVC, Portugal's planting of Borraçal decreased dramatically from 2035.12 hectares in 1999 to 1275 ha in 2007 and 187 ha in 2010.) | Azedo, Bagalhal, Bogalhal, Borraco, Borrasão, Bougalhal, Bovvaco, Cachino, Cainho Godo, Cainho Grande, Cainho Grosso, Caiño, Caiño del Pais, Caiño Gordo, Caiño Redondo 1, Caiño Tinto, Esfarrapa, Esfarrapas, Espadeiro Redondo, Morraca, Murracal, Oeil de Chapaud, Olho de Sapo, Tinta Femia, Tinta Femia de Aldan, Tinto Redondo | |
| Bouschet Petit | | 1619 | N | Aramon Noir = Amor-Não-Me-Deixes x Teinturier | Península de Setúbal PGI | Aramon Teinturier, Aramont Teinturier, Bouschet, Bouschet de Bernard, Colorino di Lucca, Le Bouschet, Negron de Aldan, Nero di Spagna, Petit Bouchet, Petit Bouschet, Petit Bouse, Pipiona, Pti Bishe, Teinturier Bouschet, Tinta da Zorra, Tintinha, Tintorera, Tinturino | |
| Bragão (See Barreto) | | | | | | | |
| Brancelhão (See Alvarelhão) | | | | | | | |
| Brancelho (See Alvarelhão) | | | | | | | |
| Branjo | 41202 | 17661 | N | Unknown | Península de Setúbal PGI | | |
| Cabernet Franc | | 1927 | N | Unknown | Beira Atlântico PGI, DoTejo PDO, Duriense PGI, Minho PGI, Lisboa - Alta-Estremadura PGI, Lisboa-Estremadura PGI, Lisboa PGI, Península de Setúbal PGI, Tejo PGI, Terras do Dão PGI | Acheria, Ardounet, Aroia, Arrouya, Auxquels, Baro, Beron, Bidure, Blauer Carmenet, Bordeaux, Bordo, Bordo Magher, Boubet, Bouchet, Bouchet Franc, Bouchet Saint-Emilion, Bouchy, Breton, Burdeas Tinto, Caberne, Cabernet, Cabernet Aunis, Cabernet Bresciano, Cabernet d'Aunis, Cabernet Franc Blauer, Cabernet Franc Crni, Cabernet Franc Nero, Cabernet Franc Noir, Cabernet Francese, Cabernet Franco, Cabernet Frank, Cabernet Gris, Cabonet, Cabrunet, Capbreton, Capbreton Rouge, Carbani, Carbenet, Carbonet, Carbouet, Carmene, Carmenet, Carmenet Blanc, Carmenet Grand, Carne Fran, Couahort, Crouchen Negre, Crouchen Noir, Fer Servadou, Fer Servandou, Gamput, Grande Voidure, Gro Kaberne, Gros Vidyur, Gro Vidyuz, Gros Bouchet, Gros Bouschet, Gros Caberne, Gros Cabernet, Gros Vidure, Gros Vidyuz, Grosse Vidure, Gros Vidyuz, Grosse Vidyur, Hartling, Kaberne, Kaberne Fran, Kaberne Frank, Kabernet, Kabernet Frank Breton, Karbinet, Karmene, Messanges, Messanges Rouge, Morenoa Veron Bouchy, Noir Dur, Petit Fer, Petit Viodure, Petite Vidure, Petite Vigne Dure, Plant Breton, Plant de l'Abbé Breton, Plant des Sables, QRO Kaberne, QRO Vidyuz, Sable Rouge, Trouchet, Trouchet Noir, Tsapournako, Verdejilla Tinto, Veron, Veron Bouchy, Veronais, Vidure, Vuidure | |
| Cabernet Sauvignon | | 1929 | N | Cabernet Franc x Sauvignon Blanc | Alentejo PDO, Algarve - Tavira - Ave PDO, Bairrada PDO, Beira Atlântico PGI, DoTejo PDO, Duriense PGI, Lagoa PDO, Lagos PDO, Lisboa PGI, Lisboa - Alenquer PDO, Lisboa - Alta-Estremadura PGI, Lisboa - Arruda PDO, Lisboa - Encostas d'Aire PDO, Lisboa-Estremadura PGI, Lisboa - Óbidos PDO, Lisboa - Torres Vedras PDO, Madeirense PDO, Minho PGI, Palmela PDO, Península de Setúbal PGI, Portimão PDO, Tavira PDO, Tejo PGI, Terras do Dão PGI, Transmontano PGI | Bidure, Bordeaux, Bordo, Bouche, Bouchet, Bouchet Sauvignon, Bourdeos Tinto, Bouschet Sauvignon, Breton, Burdeos Tinto, Cabarnet Sauvignon, Caberne, Caberne Sovinion, Cabernet Petit, Cabernet Piccolo, Cabernet Sauvignon Black, Cabernet Sauvignon Blauer, Cabernet Sauvignon CL R5, Cabernet Sauvignon Crni, Cabernet Sauvignon Nero, Cabernet Sauvignon Noir, Cabernet Sauvignon Petit, Carbonet, Carbouet, Carmenet, Castet, Dzanati, Enfin, Epicier Noir, Franzosenrebe, Kaberne Sovinjon, Kaberne Sovinon, Lafet, Lafit, Lafite, Marchoupet, Melkii Chernyi, Menut, Navarre, Petit Bouchet, Petit Bouschet, Petit Cabernet, Petit Cavernet Sauvignon, Petit Vicure, Sauvignon, Sauvignon Rouge, Sauvignonne, Vaucluse, Veron, Vidure, Vidure Petite, Vidure Sauvignon, Vidure Sauvignone, Vidure Sauvignonne, Vigne Dure, Vindure Sauvignone | |
| Cabinda | 53103 | 1930 | N | Grand Noir x Castelão | DoTejo PDO, Lisboa-Estremadura PGI, Lisboa PGI, Tejo PGI, | | |
| Cabral | | 1934 | N | Unknown (Note: With the breeder listed by VIVC as "A. Cabral", this person could have been José A.S. Cabral, staff member of the Universidade do Porto (University of Porto), or another member of the Douro winemaking Cabral family. This requires validation.) | Unknown | | |
| Cainho Bravo (See Amaral | | | | | | | |
| Cainho da Terra | | 26692 | N | Unknown | Unknown | Caiño da Terra | |
| Caínho Grosso (See Borraçal) | | | | | | Caiño Grosso | |
| Caínho Preto | | 1977 | N | Unknown | Unknown | | |
| Cainho Tinto (See Borraçal and Amaral) | | | | | | Caiño Tinto | |
| Caladoc | | 1989 | N | Grenache = Ganarcha Tinta x Côt Noir = Malbec | Alentejo PDO, Beira Atlântico PGI, DoTejo PDO, Lisboa PGI, Lisboa - Alenquer PDO, Lisboa - Alta-Estremadura PGI, Lisboa - Arruda PDO, Lisboa - Encostas d'Aire PDO, Lisboa-Estremadura PGI, Lisboa - Óbidos PDO, Lisboa - Torres Vedras PDO, Península de Setúbal PGI, Tejo PGI | Caladok, Kaladok | |
| Calrão | | 2011 | N | Unknown | Península de Setúbal PGI | | |
| Camarate | 52402 | As Camarate Tinto - 2018 | N | Cayetana Blanca = Sarigo x Alfrocheiro Preto | Bairrada PDO, Beira Atlântico PGI, DoTejo PDO, Douro PDO, Lisboa PGI, Lisboa - Alenquer PDO, Lisboa - Alta-Estremadura PGI, Lisboa - Arruda PDO, Lisboa-Estremadura PGI, Lisboa - Óbidos PDO, Lisboa - Torres Vedras PDO, Península de Setúbal PGI, Tejo PGI, Terras do Dão PGI, Transmontano PGI | Camarate Tinto, Casculho, Castelão da Bairrada, Castelão de Nosso, Castelão do Nosso, Castelão Nacional, Maroto, Morete, Moreto (Also a synonym for other varieties), Moreto de Soure, Moreto do Douro, Mortágua, Mortagua Preto, Mortagua de Vide Preta, Mureto, Negro Mouro, Preto Mouro, Touriga Nacional, Vide Preta | |
| Camarate Vermelho | | 2019 | Rs | A somatic mutation of the white variety Jampal | Unknown | | |
| Campanário | 41806 | 2026 | N | Fernão Pires x Preto Cardana | Beira Atlântico PGI, Terras do Dão PGI | | |
| Carignan Noir (see Mazuelo | | | | | | | |
| Carinhana (see Mazuelo) | | | | | | | |
| Carrasquenho (Note: VIVC lists this as a variety in its own right whereas WPL mentions it only as being the synonym for Baga and Cayetana Blanca.) (See also Baga and Sarigo) | 52605 | 24566 | N | Tinta Caiada x Malvasia Fina | Unknown | | |
| Carrega Burros | 52902 | 17267 | N | Unknown | Unknown | Esgana Raposas, Malvasias | |
| Carrega Tinto (See Tinta Grossa) | | | | | | | |
| Casculho | 50901 | 14149 | N | Alfrocheiro Preto x Cayetana Blanca = Sarigo | Douro PDO | | |
| Castañal (See Mourisco) | | | | | | | |
| Castelã | 40702 | 15627 | N | Alfrocheiro Preto x Cayetana Blanca = Sarigo | Douro PDO, Península de Setúbal PGI | | |
| Castelão | 53106 | 2324 | N | Cayetana Blanca = Sarigo x Alfrocheiro Preto | Alentejo PDO, Algarve - Tavira - Ave PDO, Bairrada PDO, Beira Atlântico PGI, DoTejo PDO, Douro PDO, Lagoa PDO, Lagos PDO, Lisboa PGI, Lisboa - Alenquer PDO, Lisboa - Alta-Estremadura PGI, Lisboa - Arruda PDO, Lisboa - Carcavelos PDO, Lisboa - Colares PDO, Lisboa - Encostas d'Aire PDO, Lisboa-Estremadura PGI, Lisboa - Óbidos PDO, Lisboa - Torres Vedras PDO, Minho PGI, Palmela PDO, Portimão PDO, Porto PDO, Setúbal PDO, Tejo PGI, Terras do Dão PGI, Transmontano PGI, Trás-os-Montes - Chaves PDO, Trás-os-Montes - Planalto Mirandês PDO | Bastardo Castico, Bastardo Espanhol, Castelana, Castellana, Castelão Francês, Castelão Real, Casteleão, Castellam, Castellão, Castellão Português, Castico, Castico Preto, João de Santarém, João Santarém, Lariao Preto, Mortagua, Mortagua de Vide Branca, Olho de Lebre, Perikvita, Periquita, Periquito, Piriquita, Piriquito, Pirriquita, Pirriquito, Santarém, Santarém Tinto, Tinta Merousa, Trincadeira | |
| Castelão Francês (See Castelão) | | | | | | | |
| Castelão 74 (Note: FPS advises, "This selection came to Foundation Plant Services in 2005 from Jorge Böhm, Viveiros Plansel S.A., Portugal. The material was JPB clone 74. The original material underwent microshoot tip tissue culture therapy at FPS in 2005. When the selection was released from quarantine in 2007, the original material received the name Castelão 01. The version of the clone that had undergone tissue culture therapy was simultaneously planted in the Classic Foundation Vineyard as a backup vine to Castelão 01. The name of the selection was changed in 2008 to Castelão PLANSEL 74 to reflect the name of the Plansel clone number. When the Russell Ranch Vineyard was established in 2011, the backup vine that had undergone tissue culture therapy was tested and qualified for that vineyard, where it was planted as Castelão 74.1. After being a proprietary selection for some years, Castelão 74 and 74.1 were released to the FPS public grapevine collection in 2019.") | | | N | A clone of Castelão | Unknown | | |
| Castico Preto (Note: VIVC lists this as a variety in its own right but provides little additional information. WPL says it is a synonym for Castelão Francês (ie Castelão) and Trincadeira Preta.)) (See also Castelão and Trincadeira Preta) | | 2326 | N | Unknown | Unknown | | |
| Casteloa | 41303 | 23126 | N | Alfrocheiro Preto x Cayetana Blanca = Sarigo | Unknown | Gajo Arroba | |
| Cidadelhe | 51308 | 12476 | N | Mourisco Tinto = Marufo x Castelão | Douro PDO, Península de Setúbal PGI | Tinta de Cidadelhe | |
| Cidreiro | 51404 | 265 | N | Unknown | Beira Atlântico PGI, Península de Setúbal PGI, Terras do Dão PGI | Cidreirinha, Pé Curto | |
| Cinsaut | | 2672 | N | Unknown | Alentejo PDO, Beira Atlântico PGI, DoTejo PDO, Lisboa PGI, Lisboa - Alta-Estremadura PGI, Lisboa-Estremadura PGI, Península de Setúbal PGI, Tejo PGI | Bastardillo Serrano, Black Malvoisie, Black Prince, Blue Imperial, Boudales, Bourdales, Bourdales Kek, Bourdales, Bourdales Kek, Bourdelas, Bourdelas Noir, Budales, Calabre, Calibre, Chainette, Cincout, Cing-Saou, Cinq Sao, Cinq-Sao, Cinq Saou, Cinq-Saou, Cinq-Saut, Cinqsaut, Cinquien, Cinsanet, Cinsault, Cinsaut Couche, Cubilier, Cubillier, Cuviller, Cuvillier, Espagne, Espagnen, Espagnin Noir, Espagnol, Froutignan, Grappu de la Dordogne, Grecau, Grecu Maculinu, Gros de Lacaze, Gros Marocain, Hermitage, Imperial Blue, Kara, Kara Takopoulo, Madiran, Madiran de Portugal, Malaga, Malaga Kek, Malvoise, Marocain, Marroquin, Maurange, Mavro Kara Melkii, Milhau, Milhaud, Milhaud de Pradel, Morterille, Morterille Noire, Moustardier Noir, Navarro, Negru de Sarichioi, Oeillade, Oeillade Noire, Ottavianello, Ottaviano, Ottavianello, Ottavianuccia, Ottavianello, Ottaviano, Pampous, Papadou, Passerille, Passerille Senso, Pedaire, Petaire, Picardan, Picardan Noir, Piede di Palumbo, Piquepoul, Piquepoul d'Uzes, Pis de Chèvre, Pis de Chèvre Rouge, Plant d'Arles, Plant d'Arles Boudales, Plant de Broqui, Plant de Broquies, Poupe de Crabe, Poupo de Crabe, Poupo de Crabo, Pousse de Chèvre, Pousse de Chèvre Rouge, Primitivo di Bernalda, Prunaley, Prunelard, Prunelas, Prunelat, Prunella, Prunellas Noir, Prunestra, Quattro Rappi, S. Saul, Salerne, Samsó, Samson, São Sau, São Saul, Senso, Sensu, Sinseur, Sinsó, Sinson, Strum, Takopulo Kara, Ulliade, Ulliaou, Uva Spina, West's White Prolific | |
| Colhão de Galo (See Coração de Galo) | | | | | | | |
| Complexa | 50201 | 2794 | N | Alicante Henri Bouschet x Black Muscat = Muscat Hamburg | Madeirense PDO | | |
| Concieira | 50902 | 2794 | N | Alfrocheiro Preto x Ramisco | Douro PDO, Península de Setúbal PGI | Cornifeito, Cornifesta, Cornifesto no Dão, Cornifesto Tinto, Cornifresco, Gajo Arroba, Tinta Bastardeira | |
| Coração de Galo | 51304 | 16954 | N | Unknown | Beira Atlântico PGI, Península de Setúbal PGI, Terras do Dão PGI | Colhão de Galo | |
| Cornifesto | 52004 | 2846 | N | Cayetana Blanca = Sarigo x Alfrocheiro Preto | Beira Atlântico PGI, Douro PDO, Península de Setúbal PGI, Porto PDO, Terras do Dão PGI, Trás-os-Montes - Chaves PDO, Trás-os-Montes - Planalto Mirandês PDO, Trás-os-Montes - Vàlpaçôs PDO | Cornicesto, Cornifesta, Cornifesto no Dão, Cornifesto Tinto, Cornifiesta, Confiesto, Cornifresco, Gajo Arroba, Tinta Bastardeira | |
| Corropio | 51405 | As Rayada Melonara - 7617 | N | Unknown | Alentejo PDO, Douro PDO, Península de Setúbal PGI | Albaranzeuli Variegato, Barrete de Clerigo, Barrete de Padre, Bonnet de Retord, Corropio, Melonera, Negra Rayada, Rayada, Rayada Melonera, Riscadinha, Ruyada, Tinta Riscadinha | |
| Corvo | 51207 | As Aubun - 761 | N | Unknown | Península de Setúbal PGI | Ambrosina, Aubun, Bonifaccenco, Bonifacenco, Bonifacengo, Bonifazina, Bonifazino, Carcaghiolli, Carcagiola, Carcajola, Cargajola, Caricagiola, Caricagliola, Carignan de Bedoin, Carignan de Bedouin, Carignan de Gigondas, Carcagiola, Carrisadolza, Castelino, Corvo Negro, Garricadolza, Grosse Rogettaz, Gueyne, Mariscola, Morescola, Motardie, Moustardier, Moustardier Noir, Moutardier, Murescola, Quenoise | |
| Deliciosa | 41707 | 3507 | N | Alicante Henri Bouschet x Montúa = Diagalves | Madeirense PDO | | |
| Doçal de Refóios (See Doce) | | | | | | | |
| Doçal | 50904 | As Docal Tinto - 3612 | N | Unknown | Península de Setúbal PGI, Minho PGI | Borralho, Cascon, Cascon Tinto, Corbillon, Desconocida Escaleira, Doçal Aragão, Doçal Grande, Doçal Graudo, Doçal Miúdo, Doçar, Doçar Borrato, Espadeiro Doce, Estradeira, Folhal, Follajeiro, Verceiruda, Verdelho Doce | |
| Doçal Tinto (See Doçal) | | | | | | | |
| Doce | 50905 | 17674 | N | Unknown | Península de Setúbal PGI, Minho PGI | Doçal de Refóios | |
| Doçália | | 25083 | N | Unknown | Rare (Note: This variety was discovered in the former parish of Marrancos in the municipality of Vila Verde in the Vinhos Verdes region. (p.55)) | | |
| Donzelinho Roxo | 41709 | 17677 | Rs | Unknown | Duriense PGI (Note: WPL reported that there were tiny quantities planted in the Trás-os-Montes area and cited a source saying that only 0.1 ha was reported in 2016.) | Donzellinho Rosa, Douradinha do Pico, Uva Petroleo | |
| Donzelinho Tinto | 52306 | 3653 | N | Cainho da Terra x Gouveio | Douro PDO, Península de Setúbal PGI, Porto PDO (Note: WPL cited a source saying that 34 ha were reported in 2016.) | Donzelhino do Castello, Donzelinho, Donzelinho Castelo, Donzelinho de Portugal, Donzelinho do Castello, Donzelinho do Castelo, Donzellinha, Donzellinho, Donzellinho do Castello, Donzellinho Macho, Donzellino do Castello, Donzelynho, Donzenillo de Castille, Menna di Vacca, Souzao, Tinto do Minho | |
| Durif (See Mondet) | | | | | | | |
| Engomada | 51008 | 12484 | N | Unknown | Douro PDO, Península de Setúbal PGI | Tinta Engomada | |
| Esfarrapa (See Borraçal) | | | | | | | |
| Esgana Cão Tinto (See Touriga Franca) | | | | | | | |
| Espadal (See Espadeiro Tinto) | | | | | | | |
| Espadeiro Mole (Note: VIVC and WPL both identify Espadeiro Mole as a synonym for the French variety Manseng Noir. Espadeiro says Espadeiro Mole is one of "several variants in the Espadeiro family of grapes.") | 51604 | As Manseng Noir - 7340 | N | Unknown | Douro PDO, Minho PGI, Península de Setúbal PGI | Areal, Arrouya, Caiño do Freixo, Caiño Freixo, Caiño Redondo, Cinza, Courbu Rouge, Espadal, Espadão, Espadeiro, Espadeiro da Terra, Espadeiro Femeeiro, Espadeiro Molle, Espadeiro da Terra, Espadeiro Molle, Espadeiro Tinto, Espadero, Espadal, Espadao, Farinhoto, Femeerio, Ferral, Ferren, Ferrol, Ferrón, Gascon, Gros Manzenc, Mancep, Mansenc Gros, Mansenc Noir, Manseng Rouge, Murco, Murico, Negron, Nevoeiro, Noir du Pays, Padeira, Padeiro, Padeiro de Basto, Padeiro Tinto, Petit Mansenc, Tinta dos Pobres, Verdelho da Sombra, Vinhão Mole | |
| Espadeiro Preto (See Vinhão) | | | | | | | |
| Espadeiro Tinto (Note: In Wine Grapes, Robinson points out that Trincadeiro is called Espadeiro in the Setúbal region and Padeiro is sometimes called Espadeiro in Minho. WPL says this variety "must not be confused with Camaraou Noir, Manseng Noir (both from France), Padeiro, Trincadeira Preta or Vinhão (all five with the synonym Espadeiro), despite the fact that they seem to be synonyms or morphological similarities.") | 24552 | 24552 | N | Unknown | Beira Atlântico PGI, Douro PDO, Minho PGI, Península de Setúbal PGI, Vinho Verde PDO, Vinho Verde - Amarante PDO, Vinho Verde - Ave PDO, Vinho Verde - Basto PDO, Vinho Verde - Cávado PDO, Vinho Verde - Lima PDO, Vinho Verde - Sousa PDO | Areal, Caiño Redondo, Cinza, Espadal, Espadao, Espadeiro da Terra, Espadeiro Tinto, Farinhoto, Gascon, Murco, Murico, Nevoeiro (This is also a variety in its own right), Padeira, Padeiro, Padeiro de Basto, Padeiro Tinto, Tinto dos Pobres | |
| Feijão (Note: VIVC lists this as a variety in its own right but provides little additional information. In addition, VIVC lists Verdelho Tinto as a variety in its own right with Verdelho Feijão as a synonym, and Verdelho Feijão as a variety in its own right with Feijão as a synonym. A search under Verdelho Feijão on WPL draws a response which includes the statement, "Synonym (also Feijao) for the grape variety Verdelho Tinto", while a search under Verdelho Tinto draws a response saying, "The red grape variety originates from Portugal. Synonyms are Feijao, Mindeco, Miudesso and Verdelho Feijão." This evidence suggests that Feijoa, Verdial Feijão and Verdial Tinto are different names for the same variety. On this basis, the three will be conflated on this table under the name Verdelho Tinto.) (See Verdelho Tinto) | | | | | | | |
| Fepiro | 41502 | 267 | N | Grand Noir x Fernão Pires | Unknown | Alemtejana, Alentajana | |
| Fernão Pires Rosada | | 17682 | Rg | A colour mutation of Fernão Pires | DoTejo PDO, Lisboa PGI, Lisboa-Estremadura PGI, Tejo PGI | Gernão Pires Rosado | |
| Ferral (Note: This listing of Ferral with Ahmeur Bou Ahmeur as a synonym is based on recent studies by Cunha et al. published as "A identidade das castas." in which "Ferral (Rg)" is identified under "Nome da casta (cor do bago)" (Variety name (berry color)) and "Ahmeur Bou Ahmeur" is shown under "Nome principal" (Primary name) as being identical. VIVC and WPL both continue to list Ferral and Ahmeur Bou Ahmeur as distinct, unrelated varieties.) | 50104 | 140 | Rg | Hebén = Mourisco Branco x Breval Negro | Península de Setúbal PGI | (For Ferral) Uvallon: (For Ahmeur Bou Ahmeur) Ahmar Bou Ahmar, Ahmar de Mascara, Ahner Bou Ahmer, Ahmer Bou'Amer, Ahmer de Mascara, Amar Bou Amar, Angelina, Angelino, Argelina, Boal Babosa, Bordija, Boto de Gall, Bourdji, Bourdjia, Brick, Casta de Ragol, Casta Tinta, Codego, Cognac, Colgar, Colorada, Corazon de Cabrito, Culo de Horza, Culo de Orza, Datilidos, Datirillos, Encarnada de Ragol, Encarnat, Flame-coloured Tokay, Flame Tokay, Flaming Tokay, Flor de Baladre, Fondo de Orza, Grumete Encarnada, Hamer Bou Hamer, Hamri, Hmar de Mascara, Imperial Negra, Imperial Roja, Raisin d'El Bord, Raisin Kabyle, Rhenish, Roget Tarda, Rouge Fils de Rouge, Rouge Père de Rouge, Rouge Tres Rouge, Royal Gordo, San Geronimo, San Jeronimo, Teta de Cabra, Teta de Vaca, Teta de Vaca Blanca, Teta de Vaca Rosa, Tin El Kelb, Tokay, Uva de Colgar, Uva de Ragol, Vlamkleur Tokai | |
| Ferral Tamara | | 4101 | Rg | Unknown | Duriense PGI | Ferral Carpinteiro, Ferral Rosada, Ferral Rouge, Ferral Rouge Rosado | |
| Folgasão Preto (Note: VIVC lists this as a variety in its own right but provides little information about it. WPL says it originated from Portugal, that "nothing is known about a possible relationship to other varieties with the Folgasão part of the name," and cites a source saying that no plantings were reported in 2016.) | | 4175 | N | Unknown | Unknown | | |
| Folgasão Roxo | 52708 | 4176 | N | A colour mutation of Folgasão | Beira Atlântico PGI, Terras do Dão PGI | Folgasão, Folgosão Roxo | |
| Formosa | | | N | Frankenthal = Schiava Grossa x Delizia di Vaprio | Duriense PGI | IP 245, Pirovano 245 | |
| Galego | 41203 | As Galego Dourado Tinto - 17258 | N | Unknown | Duriense PGI, Península de Setúbal PGI | Dourado, False Pedro, Galego, Galego Dorado Tinto, Gallego, Gallego Dourado Tinto, Moscato Galego Dourado, Olho de Lebre, Pedro Luis, Rutherglen Pedro | |
| Galego Dourado Tinto (See Galego) | | | | | | | |
| Gamay Beaujolais (See Pinot Noir) | | | | | | | |
| Garnacha Tinta | | 4461 | N | Unknown | Lisboa - Alta-Estremadura PGI, Lisboa-Estremadura PGI, Tejo PGI | Abundante, Abundante de Reguenos, Aleante, Aleante di Rivalto, Aleeaante Poggiarelli, Alivant Blau, Alicante, Alicante de Pays, Alicante di Egua, Alicante di Spagna, Alicante Grenache, Alicante Noir, Alicante Roussillon, Alicantina, Alikante, Aniga di Lanusei, Aragonais, Aragones, Aragones Macho, Aragonesa, Bernacha Negra, Black Spanish, Black Valentina, Blaue Alicante, Bois Jaune, Cananao di Sardegna, Cannonaddu, Cannonadu, Cannonadu Nieddu, Cannonao, Cannonatu, Cannonau, Cannonau di Villasor, Cannonau Nero, Cannono, Canonao, Canonao Nero, Canonazo, Carignan Rouge, Carignane, Carignane Rosso, Carignane Rousse, Crannaxia, D'Alicante, Elegante, Espagnin Noir, Francese, Gamay, Gamay Perugino, Garnaccho Negro, Garnaccia, Garnacha, Garnacha Commun, Garnacha de Aragon, Garnacha de Riola, Garnacha del Pais, Garnacha Fina, Garnacha Negra, Garnacha Negra del Pais, Garnacha Pais, Garnacha Roja, Garnachilla, Garnacho, Garnacho Negro, Garnatxa Negra, Garnatxa Ni, Garnatxa Pais, Garnatxa Tinta, Garnaxa, Gironet, Granaccia, Granacha, Granacha Fina, Granache, Granaxa, Granaxia, Granaxo, Granazzo, Grenache, Grenache à Fleurs Femelles, Grenache Black, Grenache Crni, Grenache de Alicante, Grenache de Cosperon, Grenache Nero, Grenache Noir, Grenache Rouge, Grenas Crni, Grenash de Kaspero, Grenash Noar, Guarnaccia, Iladoner, Kek Grenache, Licante, Lladoner, Lladoner Aragonese, Lladoner Negre, Lladoner Negro, Lladonet, Mencida, Navalcarnero, Navaro, Navarra, Navarre de la Dordogne, Navarro, Negra, Negru Calvese, Ranaccio, Ranconnat, Red Grenache, Redondal, Retagliadu Nieddu, Rivesaltes, Rivos Altos, Rool Grenache, Rousillon Tinto, Roussillon, Rouvaillard, Sans Pareil, Santa Maria de Alcantara, Schwarze Alicanttraube, Tai Rosso, Tentillo, Tinta, Tinta Aragoneza, Tinta Menuda, Tintella, Tintilla, Tinto, Tinto Aragon, Tinto Aragones, Tinto Basto, Tinto de Navalcarnero, Tinto Menudo, Tinto Navalcarnero, Tintore di Spagna, Tintoria, Tocai Rosso, Toccai Rosso, Toledana, Uva di Spagna, Vernaccia di Serrapetrona, Vernaccia Nera, Vernatxa | |
| Garnacha Tintorera (See Alicante Henri Bouschet) | | | | | | | |
| Gewuerztraminer (See Gewurtztraminer) | | | | | | | |
| Gewurtztraminer | | 12609 | Rg (Note: Although this variety's skin colour ranges from rose pink to red, the juice is used for making white wines only and most sources list it as being a white grape variety. For example, see WPL, "Gewürtztraminer.") | A colour mutation of Savagnin Rose | Alentejo PDO, Beira Atlântico PGI, DoTejo PDO, Duriense PGI, Lisboa PGI, Lisboa - Alta-Estremadura PGI, Lisboa-Estremadura PGI, Tejo PGI, Terras do Dão PGI, Transmontano PGI | Auvernas Rouge Clair, Blanc Brun, Blanc Court, Bon Blanc, Braunes, Cehrayi Traminer, Christkindelstraube, Christkindlestraube, Christkindltraube, Clevener, Cleverner, Clevner, Crescentia Rotundifolia, Crevena Ruziva, Crovena Ruzica, Crvena Ruzica, Crveni Traminac, Dišecí Traminec, Diseci Traminer, Dreimänner, Dreimännertraube, Dreimannen, Dreipfennigholz, Drumin, Drumin Ljbora, Ducistiy Traminer, Duret Rouge, Dushistiy, Dushisty, Dushistyi, Dushistyj, Dushistyj Traminer, Dusistiy, Edeltraube, Fermentin Rouge, Fleischrot, Fleischroth, Fleischvainer, Fleischweiner, Fleshvainer, Formentau, Formentin Rouge, Formenteau Rouge, Fränkisch, Fränkischer, Fragrant Traminer, French, Frenscher, Frentsch, Frentschentraube, Fromente Rose, Fromenteau Rouge, Füsyeres Tramini, Füszeres Tramini, Gelber Traminer, Gentil Aromatique, Gentil Rose Aromatique, Gentil-Duret Rouge, Gentile Blanc, Gentil Rose Aromatique, Gewürtz Traminer, Gewürztraminer, Gringet, Gris Rouge, Haiden, Heida, Heiligensteiner Klevner, Kirmizi Traminer, Kläbinger Klävner, Klävner, Kleinbraun, Kleinbrauner, Kleiner Traminer, Kleintraminer, Kleinweiner, Klevner von Heiligenstein, Livora, Livira Vervena, Liwora Cervena, Mala Dinka, Marziminer, Marzimmer, Mirisavi Traminac, Nature, Nature Rose, Noble Rose, Nuernberger, Nuernberger Rot, Nürnberger, Nürnberger Rot, Plant Paien, Pinat Cervena, Piros Tramini, Piros Traminire, Plant Paile, Princ Cerveny, Raminer Rozovyi, Ranfoliza, Roethlichter, Roetlichter, Röthlichter, Rötlichter, Romfoliza, Rosentraminer, Rotclevner, Rotedel, Roter Nuerberger, Roter, Roter Nürberger, Roter Nürnberger, Roter Traminer, Rotfranke, Rothedel, Rothedl, Rother Clevner, Rother Klevner, Rother Muskattraminer, Rother Nürnberger, Rother Riesling, Rother Traminer, Rothfranke, Rothfranken, Rothkläber, Rothklävner, Rothklauser, Rothweiner, Rothwiener, Rothklävler, Rotklauser, Rotklevner, Rousselet, Rousselett, Runziva, Rusa, Ruska, Ryvola, Salvagnin, Sandtraminer, Sauvagnin, Savagnin, Savagnin Blanc, Savagnin Jaune, Savagnin Rosa Aromatique, Savagnin Rose, Savagnin Rose Aromatique, Savagnin Rose Musque, Savanen Roz, Schieltraminer, St Clausler, St Klauser, Svenic, Termeno Aromatico, Tirolensis, Tokaner, Tokayer, Tramente Rose, Tramin Cervene, Tramín Červený, Tramin Korenny, Traminac, Traminac Crveni, Traminac Dišecí, Traminac Mirisavi, Traminac Mirisavi Crveni, Traminac Sivi, Traminec, Traminer, Traminer Aromatico, Traminer Aromatique, Traminer Epice, Traminer Épicé, Traminer Gelber, Traminer Musque, Traminer Parfumé, Traminer Pink, Traminer Red, Traminer Rosa, Traminer Rose, Traminer Rose Aromatique, Traminer Rosiu, Traminer Roso, Traminer Rosso, Traminer Rot, Traminer Roter, Traminer Roth, Traminer Rother, Traminer Rotter, Traminer Rouge, Traminer Roz, Traminer Rozovii, Traminer Rozovji, Traminer Rozovyi, Traminer Rozovyj, Traminer Rozowy, Tramini, Tramini Piro, Tramini Piros, Tramini Ruzh, Trammener, Tramminner, Variana, Wachenheimer Traminer | |
| Gewürtztraminer (See Gewurtztraminer) | | | | | | | |
| Gonçalo Pires | 50802 | 489 | N | Unknown | Douro PDO, Península de Setúbal PGI | | |
| Gorda (See Tinta Barroca and Tinta Gorda) | | | | | | | |
| Gouveio Preto (Note: Verdelho says this variety is often confused with Gouveio in the Douro valley. WPL warn that it should not be confused with Godello (Gouveio), Gouveio Estimado or Gouveio Real, despite the shared synonyms or morphological similarities.) | 41305 | 17685 | N | Unknown | Península de Setúbal PGI (Note: WPL says this is grown "in tiny quantities in the Trás-os-Montes" region and cites a source saying only 0.5 ha was reported in 2016.) | | |
| Gouveio Roxo | 41702 | 17246 | Rg | A colour mutation of Gouveio Preto | Unknown | Godello Rojo, Mogadouro | |
| Graciano (See Tinta Miúda) | | | | | | | |
| Graciosa | | As Tinta da Graciosa - 40709 | N | Unknown | Unknown | Tinta da Graciosa | |
| Grand Noir | | | N | Graciano x Bouschet Petit | Alentejo PDO, Beira Atlântico PGI, DoTejo PDO, Douro PDO, Lisboa PGI, Lisboa - Alta-Estremadura PGI, Lisboa - Encostas d'Aire PDO, Lisboa-Estremadura PGI, Minho PGI, Península de Setúbal PGI, Tejo PGI, Terras do Dão PGI | Alicante, Baga, Bojanka, Bojanka Mak, Galliko, Gkiobrek Kara, Gkranoba, Gran Negro, Gran Noar, Gran Nuar, Gran Nuar de la Kalmet, Gran Negro, Grand Bouschet, Grand Chernyi, Grand Noir de la Calmette (as the second main name), Granoir, Granua, Gros Noir, Gros Noir Grand Bouschet, Gros Producteur, Kalmettei Fekete, Kalmettei Nagy Fekete, Morrastel-Bouschet, Pé de Perdiz, Pé de Pombo, Sousão do Oeste, Sumo Tinto, Tinta, Tinta Fina, Tinta Francesa, Tinturao | |
| Grangeal | 51602 | 4944 | N | Unknown | Douro PDO, Península de Setúbal PGI | | |
| Grec Rouge (See Rabigato Franco) | | | | | | | |
| Grenache as Garnacha Tinta (See Garnacha Tinta) | | | | | | | |
| Grenache as Garnacha Tintorea (See Alicante Henri Bouschet) | | | | | | | |
| Grossa or Tinta Grossa | | | N | Unknown | DoTejo PDO, Lisboa PGI, Lisboa - Alta-Estremadura PGI, Lisboa-Estremadura PGI, Tejo PGI | | |
| Jacquet (See Jacquez) | | | | | | | |
| Jacquez | | | N | Vitis aestivalis x Vitis vinifera ssp. V. vc. vinifera Linné | Madeira (Note: Evidence suggests that Jacquez vines originated from the USA and were planted at Madeira late in the 17th and early 18th centuries. Its use became more widespread after Madeira's original vine plantings were largely destroyed, first by an infestation in 1851 by the powdery mildew Uncinula necator, followed in the 1870s by the vine louse Phylloxera vastatrix. As a result, wine production decreased to almost nothing, many Madeirans migrated elsewhere, and while research was underway to find preventatives for phylloxera, the old varieties were replaced largely by disease-resistant hybrid and American vines including Jacquez. This led to a brief revival of Madeira's wine output, but to the detriment of its reputation because the wines made from these grapes did not match the standards of the earlier era. Thus, from the middle of the 20th century, the "replacement" vines were ripped out and the so-called "noble grape" varieties such as Sercial, Verdelho, Boal and Malvasia were planted in their place. Small plantings of Jacquez remain on Madeira but they do not appear to be in commercial use.) | Alabama, Barbera Paesana, Black El Paso, Black July, Black Spanish, Black Spanish Alabama, Blue French, Blue French Grape, Burgundy, Cigar Box, Clarence, Deveraux, El Paso, French Grape, Jac, Jack, Jack Grape, Jacqueje, Jacques, Jacques, Jacquet, Jaques, Jaquez, July Cherry, Lenoir, Long Laliman, Longworth's Ohio, Mac Candless, Mac Condless, Madeira, Ohio, Segar, Segar Box, Segar Box Longworth, Sherry of the South, Springstein, Sugarbox Longworth, Sumpter, The Black, Thurmond, Tintiglia, Tintiglia I, Troya, Vitis Bourgquinia (Munson), Zakez, Zsake | |
| Jaen (Note: Many of the synonyms used for Jaen are also used for Mencía, and vice versa, including the name Mencía itself appearing here among the synonyms. This suggests that, despite the fact that each has different parentage, the two varieties must be very similar and have often been confused with each other. Noting the confusion, WPL says Jaen "must not be confused with the Mencía variety (Jaén Tinto), despite the fact that the synonyms or morphological similarities appear to indicate this.") | 52503 | As Jaén Tinto - 5652 | N | Listán Prieto x Cayetana Blanca = Sarigo | Bairrada PDO, Beira Atlântico PGI, DoTejo PDO, Douro PDO, Lisboa PGI, Lisboa - Alenquer PDO, Lisboa - Alta-Estremadura PGI, Lisboa - Arruda PDO, Lisboa-Estremadura PGI, Lisboa - Óbidos PDO, Lisboa - Torres Vedras PDO, Minho PGI, Península de Setúbal PGI Tejo PGI, Terras do Dão PGI | De Negra, Fernao Pires Tinta, Giao, Jaen, Jaen do Dão, Jaen du Dão, Jaen Colorado, Jaen Galego, Jaen Galeno, Jaen Noir, Jaén Tinto, Jaén, Jaén Colorado, Jaén do Dão, Jaén du Dão, Jaén Negro, Loureiro Tinto, Medoc, Mencía (Also the name of a variety in its own right), Mencía Pajaral, Mencía Pequeno, Mencía Roble, Mencin, Negra, Negro, Tinta Mollar, Tinto Mencía, Tinto Mollar | |
| Labrusco (Note: Not to be confused with Lambrusco, a grape variety widely used in Italy although it has also been planted in Argentina, Australia and Spain.) | 41204 | 6613 | N | Unknown | Douro PDO, Minho PGI, Península de Setúbal PGI (Note: WPL says this variety is also being grown in the Vinho Verde region. It cites a source saying the total planting in all regions in 2016 was 79 ha.) | | |
| Listán Prieto | | 6860 | N | Unknown | Douro PDO, | Almuneço, Arjunção, California, Comun de las Palmas, Créole Petite, Criolla, Criolla 6, Criolla Chica, Criolla Peru, El Paso, Forastero Negro, H'riri, Hariri, Hariri Noir, Khariri Noir, Listán Negra, Listán Preto, Listán Violet, Listrão, Mission, Mission Grape, Moscatel Negro, Moscatel Negro du Perou, Negra, Negra Antigua, Negra Comun, Negra Corriente, Negra Corriente ISA, Negra Corriente Majes, Negra Corriente Tacna, Negra Peruana, Pais, Palomina Negra, Printanier Rouge, Rosa del Peru, Uva Chica Negra, Uva del Pais, Uva Negra, Uva Negra Vino, Uva Pais, Uva Tinta, Vina Blanca, Vina Negra, Zerhoun Noir | |
| Listrão Roxo | | 17248 | Rg | Unknown | Unknown | Listán Morado, Liatráo | |
| Lourela | 50708 | 6914 | N | Hebén = Mourisco Branco x Cainho da Terra | Douro PDO, Península de Setúbal PGI | Lourella, Lourello, Lourelo | |
| Loureiro Bravo | | 25085 | N | Unknown | Rare (Note: This variety was discovered in the former parish of Quinchães (the report incorrectly says "Queijães") in the municipality of Fafe in the Vinhos Verdes region. (p.55)) | | |
| Lusitano | 41503 | 7000 | N | Castelão x Alicante Henri Bouschet | Unknown | Lusitano 7 | |
| Malandra | 50608 | 12487 | N | Unknown | Douro PDO, Península de Setúbal PGI | Tinta Malandra | |
| Malbec | | As Côt - 2889 | N | Magdeleine Noire des Charentes x Prunelard | Scant (Note: Evidence shows that Malbec in being grown in the Pinhão Valley area of the Douro region and is being blended with Cabernet Sauvignon and is being labelled as a "Vinho Regional Duriense".) | Aggress, Agreste, Aneroir, Ausseres, Auxerrais, Auxerrois, Auxerrois de Laquenexy, Auxerrois de Moins de Picpus, Auxerrois du Mans, Auxerrois Le Fin, Balloussat, Ballouzat, Beran, Beraou, Berau, Besparo, Blanc de Kienzheim, Blanc de Keinzheim, Bordelais Noir, Boucares, Bouchalès, Bouchalles, Bouchares, Bourguignon Noir, Bouyssales, Bouyssalet, Cagors, Cahors, Calarin, Calavu, Caours, Cau, Cauly, Chalosse Petite Noire, Chaors, Chors, Claverie, Claverie Noire, Clavier, Co, Coly, Coq Rouge, Cor, Cors, Côs, Costa Rosa, Costa Rossa, Costo Roujo, Côt a Queue Rouge, Côt a Queue Verte, Côt de Bordeaux, Côt de Pays, Côt de Touraine, Côt Malbec, Cote Rouge, Cotes Rouges, Côts, Couisse, Cruchinet, Damas, Deux Seme, Doux Noir, Doux Same, Estrangey, Étaulier, Étranger, Étranger Petit, Fin Auxerrois Franc Moreau, Gôt Noir, Gourdaux, Gourdoux, Grand Vesparo, Grande Parde, Grappe Rouge, Grelot de Tour, Grelot de Tours, Griffarin, Grifforin, Gros Auxerrois, Gros Noir, Gros Pied Rouge, Gros Pied Rouge Merille, Grosse Merille, Guillan, Hourcat, Jacobain, Jacobin, Jacobin Blauer, Jacobin Noir, Kot, Le Côt, Lou Salabaire, Luckens, Lutkens, Magret, Magrot, Malbech, Malbeck, Malbeck Doux, Malbech Noir, Malbek, Malbett à Queue Rouge, Mançin, Margrot, Maurac, Mausat, Mauzac, Mauzain, Mauzat, Medoc, Merille, Monrame, Mourame, Mourane, Mouranne, Moussac, Moussin, Moustere, Mouzat, Moza, Navarien, Negre de Prechac, Negre Doux, Negre Prechac, Negre Prechat, Negrera, Noir de Chartres, Noir de Pressac, Noir Doux, Nuar de Presac, Nyar de Presak, Œil de Perdix, Parde, Peredy, Perigord, Petit Vesparo, Pied de Perdix, Pied Doux, Pied Noir, Pied Rouge, Pied Rouget, Piperdy, Plant d'Arles, Plants de Beraou, Plant de Meraou, Plant de Peraou, Plant de Roy, Plant du Lot, Plant dy Roi, Plant Houdée, Plant Rouge, Prechat, Pressac, Prolongeau, Prunelat, Prunieral, Quercy, Queue Rouge, Quille de Coq, Quillot, Raisin de Co, Romieu, Saint-Émilion, Saint-Hilaire, Soumansigne, Teinturier, Teinturin, Terranis, Tinturin, Tinturin de la Libarde, Vesparo | |
| Malvarisco | 53308 | 17249 | N | Alfrocheiro Preto x Tinto Cão | Península de Setúbal PGI | Malvarisko | |
| Malvasia | | | | | | | |
| Malvasia Cabral | 51212 | 23975 | Rs | Unknown | Unknown | | |
| Malvasia Cândida Roxa | | As Malvasia di Sardegna Rosada - 33667 | Rs | A colour mutation of Malvasia Cândida | Madeira PDO, Madeirense PDO | Malvasia di Sardegna Rosada, Malvasia Rosada, Malvasia Roxa | |
| Malvasia Fina Roxa | | 15677 | Rs | A colour mutation of Malvasia Fina | Beira Atlântico PGI, Terras do Dão PGI | Assario Roxo, Boal Roxo, Malvasia Roxa | |
| Malvasia Preta | 53205 | 15647 | N | Cayetana Blanca = Sarigo x Alfrocheiro Preto | Beira Atlântico PGI, Douro PDO, Península de Setúbal PGI, Porto PDO, Terras do Dão PGI, Trás-os-Montes - Chaves PDO | Black Malvasia, Moreto, Mureto, Muretto, Negro Moura, Pinheira Roxa, Sillas | |
| Malvasia Rei Tinta | | 41870 | N | Unknown | Unknown | | |
| Malvasia Trigueira (See Trigueira) | | | | | | | |
| Manseng Noir (See Espadeiro Mole) | | | | | | | |
| Manteúdo Preto | 41603 | 17251 | N | Unknown | PDO Alentejo, Península de Setúbal PGI | | |
| Mário Feld Tinto (Note: According to research findings summarised by VIVC Mário Feld has been assessed as a cultivar name for Pinot Noir. The original research report can be found at.) (See also Pinot Noir) | | | N | Unknown | Madeirense PDO, Península de Setúbal PGI | | |
| Marufo | 52002 | 8086 | N | Unknown | Beira Atlântico PGI, Douro PDO, Minho PGI Península de Setúbal PGI, Porto PDO, Trás-os-Montes - Chaves PDO, Trás-os-Montes - Planalto Mirandês PDO, Trás-os-Montes - Planalto Mirandês PDO, Terras do Dão PGI, Trás-os-Montes - Vàlpaçôs PDO | Abrunhal, Barrete de Padre, Brujidera, Brujidero, Brujigero. Brujiguero, Camera, Colgadera, Crujidera, Crujidero, Crujidero di Spagna, Lagrima Noir, Lamego, Lobo, Malvasia, Marouco, Marufa, Marufo Roxo, Marujo, Moravia Dulce, Moravia Tinto, Maroco, Morisco Tinto, Mourico, Mourisca, Mourisco, Mourisco du Douro, Mourisco nos Vinhos Verdes, Mourisco Preto, Mourisco Roxo, Mourisco Tinto, Olho de Rei, Rucial, Tinta Amarela Grossa, Tinta do Caramelo, Tinta Grossa, Tinta Amarela Grossa, Tinta do Caramelo, Tinta Gross, Trujidera, Trujidero, Uva de Rei, Uva Rei, Vigorosa | |
| Mazuelo | | As Carignan Noir - 2098 | N | Unknown | Alentejo PDO, DoTejo PDO, Douro PDO, Lisboa PGI, Lisboa - Alta-Estremadura PGI, Lisboa-Estremadura PGI, Lisboa - Óbidos PDO, Península de Setúbal PGI, Tejo PGI, Transmontano PGI | Many synonyms including Axina de Spagna, Babonenc, Babounenc, Blaue Shopatna, Blaue Sopatna, Blauer Carignan, Blauer Carignant, Boi Dur, Bois du Fer, Bois Dur, Bois Dur, Bois Dure, Bova Murru, Bovale, Bovale di Spagna, Bovale Grande, Bovale Grande di Spagna, Bovale Grosso, Bovale Mannu, Bovale Murru, Bovali Mannu, Bove Duro, Bove Duro di Signa, Bove Duro di Spagna, Cafalan, Cagnolaro, Cagnolaro Tinto, Caligan, Calignan, Carignan, Carignan CRNI, Carignan Francês, Carignan Mouillan, Carignan Noir, Carignan Francis, Carignan Noir, Carignane, Carignane Mouilla, Carignane Noir, Carignane Noire, Carignane Violette, Carignanne, Carignano, Carignano di Carmignano, Carignant, Carignena, Cariñano, Carinena, Carinena Mazuela, Carinena Negra, Cariñena, Carinyena, Carinhana, Catalan, Cencibel, Ciliegiolo, Concejon, Corcejon, Crignane, Crinana, Crni, Crujillón, Crusillo, Girard, Girarde, Gragnano, Grenache du Bois, Grenache du Bois Dur, Karignan, Karinian, Karinjan, Kek Carignan, Legno Duro, Legno Duro di Portoferraio, Manuelo Tinto, Manzuela, Marocain, Mataro, Mollard, Monastrell, Monestel, Moraiola Maggiore, Mostaia, Mounestesou, Nieddera, Nudo Corto, Pinot d'Evora, Pinot Evara (Despite the name, the variety is not related to the Pinot family of grapes), Plan d'Espagne, Plant d'Espagne, Plant de Ledenon, Plant de Lédenon, Pokovec, Pokovez, Quattro Rappe, Roussillonen, Samso, Samo Crusillo, Samsó (not to be confused with a different grape of the same name known as Cinsault in France), Sanso, Sopatna Blau, Tintiglia, Tintilia, Tintillosa, Tintillu, Tinterella, Tinto Mazuela, Tinto Mazuelo, Uva di Spagna, Uva di Spagne, Zinzillosa | |
| Melhorio | | 17255 | N | Unknown | Península de Setúbal PGI | Verdial Vinhos Verdes | |
| Melra | 41309 | 12474 | N | Mourisco Tinto = Marufo x Touriga Nacional | Douro PDO, Península de Setúbal PGI | Tinta da Melra, Tinta Melra | |
| Mencía (Note: WPL warns that Mencía "must not be confused with the varieties Juan García, Jaén Tinto and Loureiro Tinto, despite the fact that synonyms or morphological similarities appear to indicate this." Comments under "Mencia" also note the confusion of identity that has reflected itself in the synonyms: "Over the years, Mencía has been known under a variety of synonyms including: Fernão Pires Tinta, Giao, Jaén, Loureiro Tinto, Mencin, Negra, Negro, Mencia Roble, Tinto Mencia and Tinto Mollar. It is known as Jaén colorado in León, not to be confused with Jaén blanco or Jaén rosado (both of which are variants of Cayetana) and Jaén tinto, from Huelva.") (See also Jaen) | | 7623 | N | Alfrocheiro Preto x Patorra | | De Negra, Fernão Pires Tinta, Giao, Jaén, Jaén du Dão, Jaén Galego, Jaén Galeno, Jaén Noir, Jaén Tinto, Loureiro Tinto, Medoc, Mencía Pajaral, Mencía Pequeno, Mencin, Negra, Negro, Tinta Mollar, Tinta Mencía, Tinto Mollar | |
| Merlot Noir | | 7657 | N | Magdeleine Noire des Charentes x Cabernet Franc | Alentejo PDO, Bairrada PDO, Beira Atlântico PGI, DoTejo PDO, Duriense PGI, Lisboa PGI, Lisboa - Alta-Estremadura PGI, Lisboa-Estremadura PGI, Lisboa - Óbidos PDO, Madeirense PDO, Minho PGI, Palmela PDO, Península de Setúbal PGI, Tejo PGI, Terras do Dão PGI | Alicante, Alicante Noir, Begney, Bidal, Bidalhe, Bigney, Bigney Rouge, Bini, Bini Ruzh, Bioney, Black Alicante, Bordeleza Belcha, Bordeleze Belcha, Cabernet del Cleto, Crabutet, Crabutet Noir, Crabutet Noir Merlau, Ferjansckova, Hebigney, Higney, Higney Rouge, Lambrusco Munari, Langon, Lecchumski, Medoc Noir, Merlau, Merlau Rouge, Merlaud, Merlaut, Merlaut Noir, Merle, Merle Petite, Merleau, Merlo, Merlot Black, Merlot Blauer, Merlot Crni, Merlot Nero, Merlott, Merlou, Odzalesi, Odzhaleshi, Odzhaleshi Legkhumskii, Petit Merle, Picard, Pikard, Plan Medre, Planet Medok, Plant du Medoc, Plant Medoc, Saint Macaire, Seme de la Canau, Seme dou Flube, Semilhon Rouge, Semilhoum Rouge, Semilhoun Rouge, Memillon Rouge, Sud des Graves, Vidal, Vini Ticinesi, Vitrai, Vitraille | |
| Mindeço (See Verdelho Tinto) | | | | | | | |
| Mindelo | | 7834 | N | (Bouschet Petit x Castelão) x Black Muscat = Hamburg Muscat | Unknown | | |
| Molar (See Tinta Negra) | | | | | | | |
| Mollar Cano (See Negra Mole) | | | | | | | |
| Mondet | 50722 | As Durif - 3738 | N | Unknown | Douro PDO, Península de Setúbal PGI | Bas Plant, Diurif, Dure, Duret, Dureza, Durif, Durif Noir, Dyurif, Gros Beclan, Gros Noir, Kek Durif, Nerin, Pareux Noir, Petit Duret, Petit Sirah, Petit Syrah, Petite Serine, Petite Sirah, Petite Syrah, Pineau de l'Ermitage, Pineau de Romans, Pinot de l'Ermitage, Pinot de l'Hermitage, Pinot de Romans, Pinot Fourcat, Plant Durif, Plant Fourchu, Portoka, Serine, Serine des Mauves, Sirane de Tain, Sirane Fourchue, Syrah Petit | |
| Mondeuse Noire (See Rodo) | | | | | | | |
| Monvedro (See also Tinta Caiada) | 51804 | 17355 | N | Unknown | Beira Atlântico PGI, DoTejo PDO, Lagoa PDO, Lagos PDO, Lisboa-Estremadura PGI, Lisboa PGI, Península de Setúbal PGI, Portimão PDO, Tejo PGI, Terras do Dão PGI | Bastardão, Bastardo, Espagnin, Monvedro Dão, Monvedro do Algarve, Monvedro Tinto, Preto João Mendes | |
| Monvedro de Sines (See also Tinta Caiada) | | 26254 | N | Unknown | Unknown | Bonvedro | |
| Monvedro Tinto (See Monvedro) | | | | | | | |
| Moreto | 52301 | 7992 | N | Cayetana Blanca = Sarigo x Alfrocheiro Preto | Alentejo PDO, Beira Atlântico PGI, DoTejo PDO, Duriense PGI, Lagoa PDO, Lisboa PGI, Lisboa - Alta-Estremadura PGI, Lisboa-Estremadura PGI, Península de Setúbal PGI, Tejo PGI, Terras do Dão PGI | Arruya, Casculo, Castellão, Moreto d'Alenteijo, Moreto d'Alentejo, Moreto do Alentejo, Morito, Mureto, Mureto do Alentejo, Tinta de Altar | |
| Maroco (See Marufo) | | | | | | | |
| Moscargo | 41508 | 9611 | N | Black Muscat = Muscat Hamburg x Castelão | Unknown | Portalegre | |
| Moscatel de Bago Miúdo Tinto | | 24699 | N | Unknown | Unknown | Moscatello Nero, Moscato Nero | |
| Moscatel Galego Roxo (See Muscatel Roxo) | | | | | | | |
| Moscatel Galego Tinto | 41301 | 17697 | N | Muscat à Petits Grains Blancs x Alvarelhão | Duriense PGI, Península de Setúbal PGI | Moscatel Galego, Moscatel Galego T | |
| Moscatel Roxo (See Muscatel Roxo) | | | | | | | |
| Moscatel Tinto (See Moscatel Galego Tinto) | | | | | | | |
| Mouraton (See Tinta Gorda) | | | | | | | |
| Mourisco (Note: WPL ("Mourisco.") says this is a synonym for Marufo, Mourisco de Semente, Palomino and Tinta Castañal. As advised by Cunha et al., Castañal is registered in CAN under the name Mourisco.) | 51701 | As Castañal - 23051 | N | Unknown | Unknown | Castañal, Rabo de Cordeiro, Tinta Castañal | |
| Mourisco de Semente | 51402 | 12471 | N | Mourisco Tinto = Marufo x Caiño Tinto = Borraçal | Duriense PGI, Península de Setúbal PGI | Albino de Sousa, Albino de Souza (This is also a synonym for Touriga Franca), Mourisco (Mourisco is also a variety under this same name), Mourisco de Braga, Tinta de Barca (Tinta de Barca is also a variety under this same name) | |
| Mourisco de Trevões | 41306 | 17698 | N | Unknown | Duriense PGI, Península de Setúbal PGI, Transmontano PGI | Mourisco Trevões | |
| Mourisco Tinto (See Marufo) | | | | | | | |
| Mulata | 53407 | 8154 | N | Castelão x Alicante Henri Bouschet | Unknown | Leão Ferreira da Almeida 11-48-49 | |
| Murraçal (See Borraçal) | | | | | | | |
| Muscatel Roxo | | As Muscat à Petits Grains Rouge - 8248 | Rg | A colour mutation of Muscat à Petits Grains Blanc | Duriense PGI, Palmela PDO, Setúbal PDO, Trás-os-Montes - Chaves PDO | Apiana Moschata, Brauner Muskateller, Brown Frontignac, Brown Muscat, Busuioacă, Busuioacă de Bohotin, Busuioacă di Bohotin, Busuioaca Roza, Busuioaca Vanata, Busuioaca Vanata di Bohotin, Cehrayi Muskat, Cervena Dincha, Cervena Dinka, Grauer Muskateller, Grauroter Muskateller, Grizeline, Grizly Frontinac, Grizzly Frontignan, Gros Muscat Violet, Kümmeltraube, Madère, Montepulciano, Moscadello Rosso, Moscado Rosso, Moscatel de Grano Menudo Rojo, Moscatel Galego Roxo, Moscatel Gordomorado, Moscatel Menudo, Moscatel Menudo Morado, Moscatel Rojo, Moscatel Roxo, Moscatella Rubra, Moscato Rosata, Moscato Rosso, Moscato Rosso de Madera, Moscato Violetto, Moscha Aromatica, Moscodel Menudo Morado, Muscat à Petits Grains Rouges, Muscat Brun, Muscat Corail, Muscat d'Alsace Rouge, Muscat de Corail, Muscat Frontignan Rouge, Muscat Frontignon, Muscat Frontinyanskiy, Muscat Gris, Muscat Piemont, Muscat Pink, Muscat Red, Muscat Rouge, Muscat Rouge de Frontignan, Muscat Violet, Muscat Violet Commun, Muscat Violet Cyperus, Muscat Rouge à Petits Grains Muscat Rouge de Frontignac, Muscat Rouge de Frontignan, Muscat Rouge de Madeira, Muscat Rozovy, Muscat Violet, Muscat Violet Commun, Muscat Violet Cyperus, Muscat Violet de Madère, Muscateller Rubbra, Muscateller Rot, Muscateller Violet, Muskat Frontinyanskii, Muskat Frontinyanskiy, Muskat Kalyaba, Muskat Krasnyi, Muskat Krasnyj, Muskat Rozovyi, Muskat Rozovyj, Muskat Violetovii, Muskateller Grau, Muskateller Rot, Muskateller Roter, Muskateller Schwarzblau, Muskateller Violett, Piros Muskotaly, Qirmizi Muskat, Red Constantia, Red Frontignac, Red Frontignan, Red Muscadel, Red Muscat, Red Muskadel, Roter Muskateller, Rothe Schmeckende, Rothe Schmeckete, Rother Frontignac, Rother Muscateller, Rother Spanischer Muskateller, Rother Weihrauch, Rother Weirauch, Rothmuscateller, Schmeckende, Schmeckende Roth, Schmeckete, Tafeltraube Fleischmann, Tamaiioasa de Bohotin, Tamaioasa di Bohotin, Tamaioasa Violeta, Uva Turca Rubra, Violetter Muskateller, Weihrauch Roth, Wohlschmeckende Bisamrebe | |
| Negra Minor (See Negra Mole and Tinta Negra) | | | | | | | |
| Negra Mole | 52202 | As Mollar Cano - 7901 | N | Hebén = Mourisco Branco x ? | Algarve - Tavira - Ave PDO, Beira Atlântico PGI, DoTejo PDO, Lagoa PDO, Lagos PDO, Lisboa PGI, Lisboa - Alta-Estremadura PGI, Lisboa-Estremadura PGI, Madeira PDO, Madeirense PDO, Portimão PDO, Península de Setúbal PGI, Tejo PGI, Terras do Dão PGI | Boxo, Duhamelii, Listan Morado, Listan Negro, Molar, Mollar, Mollar Cano, Mollar de América, Mollar de Cádiz, Mollar de Granada, Mollar de Huelva, Mollar ICA, Mollar Negro, Mollar Prieto, Mollar Sevillano, Mollar Zucari, Mollis, Mollissima, Morisca, Mulata, Mulata Negra, Negra Criolla, Negra Mole, Negra Mole Tinta, Negra Moll, Negramoll, Negramoll Mulata, Negramolle, Pascoal, Rabo de Ovelha Tinto, Saborinho, Tinta de Madeira, Tinta Madeira, Tinta Negra, Tinta Negra Mole, Verdejo Negro, Verdejo Tinto | |
| Negramoll (See Negra Mole) | | | | | | | |
| Nevoeira | 52005 | 8504 | N | Unknown | Unknown (Note: WPL cites a source saying that no plantings were reported in 2016.) | Couceira, Fariheira, Farinhata, Navoeira, Nevoeiro, Tinta dos Pobres, Tinta dos Podres, Tinta Nevoeira | |
| Olho de Rei (See Marufo) | | | | | | | |
| Olho de Sapo (See Borraçal) | | | | | | | |
| Padeiro (See also Espadeiro Tinto) | 50806 | 17360 | N | Hebén = Mourisco Branco x Sezao | Minho PGI, Vinho Verde PDO, Vinho Verde - Ave PDO, Vinho Verde - Basto PDO, Vinho Verde - Cávado PDO | D. Pedro, Padeiro de Basto, Tinto Cão (This is also a variety in its own right but is often mistaken for Padeiro), Tinto Matias | |
| Padeiro de Basto (See Espadeiro Mole and Padeiro) | | | | | | | |
| Pagadividas (Note: VIVC lists Pagadividas as a variety in its own right and Paga Divida as a synonym. WPL does not list Pagadividas but has entry for Paga Divida which it says is a synonym for Baga.) | | 8868 | N | Unknown | Unknown | Paga Divida | |
| Palomino Negro | | 8890 | N | Unknown | Duriense PGI, | | |
| Pampal Gira | | 21424 | N | Unknown | | Pampal Guira | |
| Pardo Verdelho | | 21432 | Gr | Unknown | Unknown | Is Boal Pardo (Grey Boal) a synonym for this variety? | |
| Parreira Matias | 52702 | 15683 | N | Alfrocheiro Preto x Airén | DoTejo PDO, Lisboa PGI, Lisboa - Alta-Estremadura PGI, Lisboa-Estremadura PGI, Península de Setúbal PGI, Tejo PGI | Parreira Mathias, Parrilha | |
| Parraleta (See Tinta Caiada) | | | | | | | |
| Patorra | 52006 | 8977 | N | Unknown | Douro PDO, Península de Setúbal PGI | | |
| Pau Ferro (See Tinta Caiada) | | | | | | | |
| Pé Agudo | | 9062 | N | Unknown | Unknown | Pégudo | |
| Pé de Perdiz (See Vinhão | | | | | | | |
| Pechim | | 9069 | Rg | Unknown | Unknown | Pechem, Pevam, Pexam, Pichem | |
| Pedral | 52105 | 9078 | N | Unknown | Minho PGI, Península de Setúbal PGI, Vinho Verde PDO | Alvarinho Tinto, Cainho dos Milagres, Cainho Espanhol, Castelão, Dozal, Padral, Pardal, Pedral Noir, Pedrol, Pégudo, Perna de Perdiz, Verdejo Colorado | |
| Peloursin (See Tinta Penajoia) | | | | | | | |
| Penamacor (See Rufete) | | | | | | | |
| Periquito (See Castelão) | | | | | | | |
| Pêro Pinhão | | 17709 | N | Unknown | Península de Setúbal PGI | | |
| Petit Bouchet or Petit Bouschet (See Bouschet Petit) | | | | | | | |
| Petit Verdot (See Verdot Petit) | | | | | | | |
| Péxem | | 9212 | N | Unknown | Península de Setúbal PGI | Arjuncão | |
| Pical | 51007 | As Piquepoul Noir - 9298 | N | Unknown | Minho PGI, Península de Setúbal PGI | Avillo, Blaue Pique Poul, Kek Piquepoul, Languedocien, Pic à Poule Noir, Pic Pul, Pical, Pical Negro, Pical Polho, Pical Polo, Pical-Polho, Picalpolho, Picapoll, Picapoll Negro, Picapoll Tinta, Picapoll Tinto, Picapolla, Picapouia, Picapoula, Picapoule, Picapouya, Picapulla, Picpouille, Picpoul, Picpoule, Picquepoul, Picapulla, Picapouille, Picpoul, Picpoule, Picpoule, Picquepoul, Pikepul Chernyi, Pique Poule, Pique Poule Blaue, Pique Poule Bourret, Pique Poule Noir, Piquepoule, Piquepoul Noir Piquerette Noire | |
| Pilongo | 51606 | 16955 | N | Unknown | Unknown | Arinto Tinto (by the Domingo Soares Private Collection), Espanhol, Pé Tenro, Preto Cardana, Rosete Espalhado, Tinta Espanhola, Tourigo do Douro | |
| Pinot d'Evora (See Mazuelo) | | | | | | | |
| Pinot Evara (See Mazuelo) | | | | | | | |
| Pinot Gris or Pinot Grigio | | 9275 | Gr | A clone mutation of Pinot Noir | Alentejo PDO Beira Atlântico PG DoTejo PDO, Lisboa PGI, Lisboa-Estremadura PGI, Tejo PGI | Affumé, Anche Cendrée, Arnaison Gris, Arnoison Gris, Aserat, Auvergnas Gris, Auvergne Gris, Auvernas Gris, Auvernat Gris, Auvernet, Auzerrat, Auxerrois Gris, Auxoi, Auxois, Auzerois Gris, Baratszinszoeloe, Bayonner, Beurot, Bilibone, Blauer Riesling, Blauer Traminer, Borgogna Grigio, Boz Pino, Brombesta, Brot, Bureau, Burgundac Sivi, Burgunder, Burgunder Grauer, Burgunder Roter, Burgundi Szuerke, Burgunske Sede, Burgundske Sive, Burot, Casper, Champagner, Clävner Roth, Cordelier Gris, Cordonnier Gris, Crvena Klevanjka, Druher, Drusen, Drusent, Druser, Edelclävner, Edelklevner, Enfumé, Enfumé Griset, Faultraube, Fauvet, Friset, Fromenteau, Fromenteau Gris, Fromentot, Grau Clevner, Grau Malvasir, Grauburgunder, Grauclevner, Graue Burgunder, Graue Savoyertraube, Grauer Burgunder, Grauer Vlaevner, Grauer Clevner, Grauer Klevner, Grauer Mönch, Grauer Riesling, Grauer Ruländer, Grauer Tokayer, Grauklaeber, Grauklaevner, Grauklevner, Gris Cordelier, Gris de Dornot, Griset, Hamsas Szollo, Hamuszoeloe, Hamvas Szoeloe, Kapuziner Kutten, Kapuzinerkutten, Klebroth, Kleiner Traminer, Kleingrau, Klevanjka, Klevanjka Crvena, Klevner Rot, Levrant, Levraut, Malvasier Grau, Malvoisie, Malvoisien, Mauseri, Mauserl, Mausfarbe, Mönch Grau, Molvoisie Valais, Moreote Gris, Moreote Gris Rouge, Murys, Murysak, Muscade, Muscadet, Musler, Noirin Gris, Ouche Cendrée, Overnya Gri, Petit Gris, Pineau Cendré, Pineau Cindrée, Pineau Gris, Pineau Rosé, Pino Cernyi, Pino Gree, Pino Grey, Pino Gri, Pino Qri, Pino Servj, Pino Seryi, Pinor Gri, Pinot, Pinot Beurot, Pinot Buerot, Pinot Burot, Pinot Cendré, Pinot Franc Gris, Pinot Griccio, Pinot Griggio, Pinot Seryi, Pinot Sivi, Piros Kisburgundi, Pirosburbundi, Pyshik, Rajik, Rauchler, Rauländer, Rebfahl, Rehfahl, Rehfal, Reilander, Phein Traube, Rheingau, Rheingrau, Rheintraube, Riesling Grau, Rijick, Rijik, Rohlander, Rolander, Rollander, Roloender, Ronci Sedive, Roter Burgunder, Roter Vlevner, Roter Clewner, Roter Kläner, Roter Klevner, Rothe Savoyertaube, Rothe Savoyertraube, Rother Claevner, Rother Clevner, Rother Drusen, Rother Klävener, Rother Klävner, Rother Klevner, Rother Rulander, Rothfränkisch, Rouci Serive, Ruhländer, Ruhlandi, Ruländer, Ruländer Sivi, Ruland, Rulanda, Rulandac Sivi, Rulandec, Rulander, Rulander Grauer, Rulander Gray, Rulander Grigio, Rulandske, Rulandske Sede, Rulendac, Rulendac Sivi, Rulender, Ryjik, Ryzhik, Ryzik, Sarfeher Szoeloe, Sarfejerszoeloe, Schieler, Sivi Pinot, Skuerkebarat, Speierer, Speirer, Speyeren, Speyerer, Speyrer, Spinavy Hrozen, Spinovy Hrozen, Stahler, Strahler, Szürke Barat, Szürke Burgundi, Szürke Kisburgundi, Szürke Klevner, Szürke Rulandi, Szürke barat, Szürke barat, Tockay Gris, Tockayer, Tokai, Tokai Gris, Tokay, Tokay d'Alsace, Tokay de Alsace, Tokay di Alsace, Tokayer, Tokayer Grauer, Tromentau Gris, Valais, Viliboner, Villiboner, Vinum Bonum, Wiliboner, Zeleznak | |
| Pinot Noir | | 9279 | N | Savagnin Blanc = Traminer x ? | Alentejo PDO, Bairrada PDO, Beira Atlântico PGI, DoTejo PDO, Douro PDO, Lisboa PGI, Lisboa - Alta-Estremadura PGI, Lisboa-Estremadura PGI, Lisboa - Óbidos PDO, Minho PGI, Península de Setúbal PGI, Tejo PGI, Terras do Dão PGI, Transmontano PGI | Aprofekete, Arbst, Arbst Blau, Arbst Blauer, Assmannshäuser, Augustiner, Augustinier, Auvergnat, Auvergnat Nero, Auvergne, Auvernas, Auvernas Rouge, Auvernat, Auvernat Noir, Auvernat Teint Noir, Berligout, Black Burgundy, Black Cluster, Black Morillon, Blak Burgundy, Blau Boden See Traub, Blau Burgunder, Blauburgunder, Blauer, Blauer Arbst, Blauer Augustiner, Blauer Burgunder, Blauer Clävner, Blauer Clevner, Blauer Klävner, Blauer Kläver, Blauer Klevner, Blauer Klewner, Blauer Nürnberg, Blauer Nürnberger, BlauerRischling, Blauer Seeklevner, Blauer Seeklvner, Blauer Spätburgunder, Blauer Sylvaner, Blaurer Statburgunder, Bodenseetraube, Böhmischer, Bon Plant, Borgogna Nera, Borgogna Rosse, Bourgignon, Bourgignon Noir, Bourgoignon Noir, Bourguignon, Bourguignon Gros, Bourguignon Noir, Bourguignon Petit, Bruenlaeubler, Burgunda, Burgundac Cernii, Burgundac Crni, Burgundac Crni Pozni, Burgunder, Burgunder Blau, Burgunder Blauer, Burgunder Grosse Blaue, Burgunder Kleine Blaue, Burgunder Roter, Burgunder Schwarz, Burgundi Crni, Burgundi Kék Apio, Burgundi Kék Apro, Burgundi Kék Aproszemue, Burgundi Mic, Burgundske Modre, Burgundy, Cerna, Cerna Okrugla, Cerna Okrugata Banka, Cerna Ranka, Chambertin, Champagner, Cherna, Chiavenase, Chiavenna, Chpatchok, Clävner, Clävner Blau, Clävner Schwarz, Clavensis, Clevner, Clevner Mariafeld, Cluster, Coraillod, Cortaillod, Corton, Czerna Okrugla Rauka, Derice Auvernas Noir, Dickblau, Early Black, Echter Schwarzblauer Klevner, Elsasser Rot, Elsasser Rother, Fekete Cilifaut, Fin Noir, Fin Noir de Toulon, Fin Plant Doré, Formentin Noir, Fränkische Schwarze, Franc Noiren, Franc Noirien, Franc Pineau, Franc Pinot, François Noir, Frischschwarzer, Frühblaue, Frühblauer, Frühschwarzer, Fruhblauer, Gamais, Genetin de St Menin, Gentil Noir, Glävinger, Glasschwarz, Grauer Burgunder, Gribalet Noir, Grobes Süsschwarz, Grosse Burgunder, Grosse Frühschwarse, Grosse Burgunder, Gut Blau, Gutblau, Hohmann 28/95/46/4+5, Jakabscoeloe, Karapino, Kék Burgundi, Kék Kisburgundi, Kék Klevner, Kék Rulandi, Kis Burgundi, Kis Burgundikek, Kisburgundi, Kisburgundi Kék, Klävner, Klävner Schwarz, Klebrot, Klebroth, Klebrott, Kleine Burgunder, Kleiner Burgunder, Kleinrot, Kleinroth, Klevinger, Klevner, Klevner Kék, Klevner Schwarzblau, Kocinka, Korai Kekburgundi, Langedet, Mährchen, Malterdinger, Maltertinger, Mario Feld, Marillon N, Massouquet, Massoutel, Massoutet, Maurillon, Maurillon de Bourgogne, Mensois, Modra Burgunda, Modra Klevanja, Modra Klevanjka, Modra Klevanyka, Modri Pinot, Möhrchen, Möhrchen Blaues, Möhrlein, Mohrenkoenigin, Mohrenkoenigin Frühblaue, Mor Burgunder, Moreote Noir, Moreotische Traube, Morillon, Morillon Noir, Mourillon, Nagyburgundi, Nera, Nere, Neyran, Neyron Petit, Noble, Noble Joué, Noir de Franconie, Noir de Franconier, Noir de Versitch, Noiren, Noir Menu, Noir Meun, Noiried, Noirien, Noirien Franc, Noirien Ternent, Noirin, Noirun, Okrugla Ranka, Ordinärer Blauer, Ordinärer Rother, Orleanais, Orleans, Petit Bourguignon, Petit Noir, Petit Noirin, Petit Plant Doré, Petit Verot, Petite Lyonnaise, Pignol, Pignola, Pignolet, Pignoliga, Pignolo, Pignolus, Pignuola, Pimbart, Pineau, Pineau de Bourgogne, Pineau de Bourgoyne, Pineau de Chambertin, Pineau de Gevrey, Pineau Franc, Pineau Noir, Pino Black, Pino Ceren, Pino Cernii, Pino Cheren, Pino Chernyi, Pino Chernyj, Pino Corni, Pino Cornij, Pino Fran, Pino Go, Pino Negru, Pino Nero, Pino Nuar, Pino Qo, Pinot, Pinot Bianco, Pinot Cernii, Pinot Clevner Cl. Maria-Feld, Pinot Crni, Pinot d'Ay, Pinot de Bourgogne, Pinot de Chambertin, Pinot de Fleury, Pinot de Gevrey, Pinot de Migraine, Pinot de Ribeauvillers, Pinot de Volnay, Pinot de Vougeot, Pinot Droit, Pinot Fin, Pinot Franc Noir, Pinot Grigio, Pinot Liebault, Pinot Maré, Pinot Mariafeld, Pinot Negru, Pinot Nera, Pinot Nero, Pinot Noar, Pinot Noir Cortaillod, Pinot Noir Cortaillod 9-18, Pinot Noir Salvagnin, Pinot Salvagnin, Pinot Tinto, Plack Morillon, Plant á Bon Vin, Plant Dae, Plant de Cumière, Plant de Cumières, Plant de la Dole Noir, Plant de S. Martin, Plant Doré, Plant Fin, Plant Medaille, Plant Noble, Précoce de Ribeauvilliers, Pynoz, Qara Pino, Raisin de Bourgogne, Rauci Velke, Raucj, Raucy, Raucy Male, Rauka Druge Struke, Roter Aßmannhäuser, Roter Aßmannshäuser, Roter Burgunder, Roter Burgunder, Rother, Rother Aßmannshäuser, Rother Burgunder, Rouci, Rouci Male, Rouci Modre, Roucimodre, Rouget, Rulandske Modre, Sachemo, Salvagnin, Salvagnin Noir, Samoireau, Samoreau, Samtrot, Saumensois, Saumoireau, Savagin Noir, Savagnin Noir, Schnetzler, Schurzir Riesling, Schwartz Klevner, Schwarz Träuble, Schwarzblauer Klevner, Schwarze Fränkische, Schwarzer, Schwarzer Aßmannshäuser, Schwarzer Burgunder, Schwarzer Champagner, Schwarzer Klävner, Schwarzer Klevner, Schwarzer Riesling, Schwarzer Rissling, Schwarzer Süßling, Schwarzer Tokayer, Schwarzklävner, Schwarzklevner, Schwarzträuble, Servagnier, Servagnin, Servagnin Noir de Seyssel, Sevagnin Noir, Shpachock, Shpachok, Shpetburgunder, Spacok, Spätburgunder, Spätburgunder Blauer, Später Burgunder, Spätes Moehrchen, Spätes Moerchen, Spatburgunder, Spetburgunder, Stolle 514, Süßblau, Süßedel, Süßling, Süßrot, Süßroth, Süßschwarz, Süßschwarzer, Sußchwarzer, Süßschwarz Grober, Talvagnere Rouge, Talvagnüs Rouges, Ternent, Thalrother, Tinto, Traminer Blau, Traminer Schwarz, True Burgundy, Vert Doré, Vrai Auvernas, Waltertinger, Weißburgunder, Zuncic | |
| Piñuela (See Aragonez) | | | | | | | |
| Piquepoul Noir (See Pical) | | | | | | | |
| Pirraúvo (See Alvarelhão) | | | | | | | |
| Portalegre (See Moscargo) | | | | | | | |
| Português Azul | 50605 | As Portugieser Blau - 9620 | N | Blauer Portugieser x Sylvaner | Beira Atlântico PGI, Douro PDO, Península de Setúbal PGI, Terras do Dão PGI | Autrichien, Azul, Badener, Badner, Blanc Doux, Blau Fränkisch, Blau Fränkische, Blaufränkische, Blaufranchis, Blaufranchisch, Blaue Feslanertraube, Blaue Feslauertraube, Blauer Fraenchischer, Blauer Limberger, Blauer Oporto, Blauer Portugieser, Blue French, Blue Portuguese, Bonnette, Brina, Borgonja, Burgund Mare, Cerna Krajelvna, Cerna Kraljevina, Cerne Rane, Cerne Skalicke, Cerne Starosvetske, Cerny Muskatel, Cerny Syrk, Chirokolistny, Cierny Zierfandler, Crna Frankovka, Crna Kraljevina, Crna Moravka, Crne Kraljevina, Early Burgundy, Fernon, Feslauertraube, Fränkische, Fränkische Schwarz, Franconia, Franconia Nera, Franconia Nero, Franconien Noir, Frankinja, Frankinja Modra, Frankovka, Frankovka Modra, Frueher Blaure Portugieser, Frueher Voerlauer, Frueher Voeslauer, Fruehreife Garidelitraube, Fruh Portugieser, Gamay Noir, Gamé, Giugnaiola, Imbergher, Imbrina, Jubiläumsrebe, Karmazin, Ké Kopertó, Kék Frankos, Kék Oportó, Kék Portugizi, Kékfrank, Kékfrankos, Kékoportó (A name once used in Hungary but no longer), Kraljevina, Kraljlvina, Lampart, Laska Modrina, Lemberger, Limberg, Limberger, Limberger Blaur, Limberger Noir, Limburske, Maehrische, Maviona Rana, Mavrvona Rana, Modra Frankija, Modra Frankinja, Modra Kraljevina, Modra Portugalka, Modry Hyblink, Modrý Portugal, Mor Portugieser, Moravka, Moraske, Moravna, Muskateller Schwarz, Nagy Burgundi, Nagyburgundi, Nera Glabra di Modolo, Neskorak, Neskore, Neskore cierne, Noir de Franconie, Oporto, Oporto Kek, Oporto Vaeslauer, Oportoi, Oportorebe, Opporto, Orna Frankovka, Perequita, Plant de Oporto, Plant de Porto, Porthogese, Porthogese Nero, Porthogeze, Portjuge, Portoghese, Portoghese Nero, Portokiz, Portougalska, Portougalsky Siny, Portugais, Portugais Bleu, Portugais de Bingen, Portugais Lerouse, Portugais Noire, Portugais Rouge, Portugaise, Portugal, Portugalika, Portugaljka, Portugalka, Portugalkia, Portugalakja, Portugalské Modré, Portugalské Siva, Portugalski, Portugalskie, Portugalskii Sinii, Portugalskij Sinij, Portugalsky Siny, Portuge Bleu, Portughese, Portugieser, Portugieser Azul, Portugieser Blau, Portugieser Blauer, Portugieser Rother, Portugiesi, Portugiesische, Portugiezi, Portugizac, Portugizac Crni, Portugizal Crni, Portugizee, Portugizer, Portugizer N, Portugroljka, Portugues Azul, Pozdni, Pozdni Skalicke Cerne, Prokupac, Raisin des Roses, Rana Modra, Rana Modra Kraljevina, Ranina, Schwarz Limberger, Schwarze, Schwarze Fraenkische, Schwarzer Burgunder, Schwarzgrobe, Serina, Shirokolistnyi, Sirokolidtnyj, Sirokolstnii, Skalicke cerne, Skorak, Skore Cerne, Starovetsky hrozen, Sura Liscina, Szeleslevelü, Teltfürtü Kékfrankos, Uessinella, Vaghyburgundi, Velke bugundske, Veslaver, Veste de Monaco, Vojvodin, Vöslaner, Vöslauer, Voslaner, Weslau | |
| Preto Cardana | 52705 | 17356 | N | Cayetana Blanca = Sarigo x Molar = Tinta Negra | DoTejo PDO, Lisboa PGI, Lisboa-Estremadura PGI, Península de Setúbal PGI, Tejo PGI | Espanhol, Pé Tenro, Pilongo, Rosete Espalhado, Tinta Espanhola, Tourigo do Doura, Tourigo do Douro | |
| Preto Martinho | 51803 | 9685 | N | Mourisco Tinto = Marufo x Carrega Tinto | Unknown | Amostrinha, Preto Martinho do Oeste | |
| Primavera | 53102 | 9700 | N | Castelão x Alicante Henri Bouschet | Unknown | | |
| Primitivo | | 9703 | N | Unknown | Alentejo PDO, Beira Atlântico PGI, Duriense PGI, Lisboa PGI, Lisboa - Alta-Estremadura PGI, Lisboa-Estremadura PGI, Península de Setúbal PGI | Aglianica, Aglianico, Aglianico del Vulture, Bikača, Cjutiitza, Crljenak Crni, Crljenak Kastelanski, Crni Krstač, Gioia del Colle, Grakošija, Kastelanač, Krakošija, Kratkosiča, Kratkošija, Kratkošija Crna, Kratkošija ili Vran, Kratkošija Mala, Kratkošija sa dubokim urezima, Kratkošija Srednja, Krkošija, Ljutiča, Ljutiitza, Mali Crni Palvanc, Morellone, Palvanc Crni Mali, Palvanz, Palvanz Blauer, Palvanz Mali Zern, Plavac Veliki, Pribidrag, Primaticcio, Primativo, Primativo Nero, Primitivo di Gioia, Primitivo Nero, Reaviča, Rehuljača, Srdenji Vranac, Starinski Plavac, Trebidrig, Tribidrag, Uva della Pergola, Uva di Corata, Vagari Palvanz, Velji Vranac, Vran, Vrancič, Vrancina, Vranj, Zagarese, Zagarese Nero, Zin, Zinfandel | |
| Rabigato Franco | 51613 | As Grec Rouge - 4962 | Rs | Unknown | Duriense PGI | Barbarossa Verduna, Barbaroux, Caleb Grape, Chervony Grozdy, Cipar, Cipar Rumeni, Ciparka, Grec Rosé, Grec Rouge, Grecheskii Rozovyi, Grisa Rossa, Grisa Rousa, Grozdi, Ivernasso, Kalebstraube Wue 1201, Malvasia Purpura, Marokkanskii Vinograd, Napoletana, Poma Rosha, Pulitana, Rabigato Franco, Rabigato Francês, Rabigato Rosa, Sant'Anna, Shasla Grecheskaya, Soria | |
| Rabo de Anho | 52903 | 12460 | N | Unknown | Minho PGI, Península de Setúbal PGI, Vinho Verde PDO, Vinho Verde - Basto PDO | Medock, Rabo de Ovelha, Rabo de Ovelha nos Vinhos Verdes, Rabo de Ovelha Tinta, Rabo de Ovelha Tinto | |
| Rabo de Lobo | | 9860 | N | Unknown | Duriense PGI, Península de Setúbal PGI | | |
| Rabo de Ovelha Tinto (Note: In the past this variety has been classified as a Rabo de Anho cultivar, but this research program identified this as being incorrect, explaining why it has been listed here as a new genotype. (pp. 55-56) The variety is not listed by VIVC, and WPL says it is a synonym for Negramoll.) | | | N | Unknown | Rare (Note: This variety was discovered in the former parish of Ancede in the municipality of Baião in the Vinhos Verdes region. (p.55)) | | |
| Ramisco | 52203 | 9899 | N | Unknown | DoTejo PDO, Lisboa PGI, Lisboa - Colares PDO, Lisboa-Estremadura PGI, Península de Setúbal PGI, Tejo PGI | Ramisco Açores, Ramisco de Colares, Ramisco Enforcadado, Ramisco nos Açores, Ramisco Tinto | |
| Rayada Melonera (See Corropio) | | | | | | | |
| Redondal (See Alicante Henri Bouschet) | | | | | | | |
| Ricoca | 51103 | 12494 | N | Mourisco Tinto = Marufo x Trousseau Noir = Bastardo | Douro PDO, Península de Setúbal PGI | Tinta Recoca, Tinta Ricoca | |
| Roal | 53806 | 10298 | Rs | Unknown | Unknown | Rocia, Rocial, Rual, Rual Ferreira | |
| Rodo | 51708 | As Mondeuse Noire - 7921 | N | Mondeuse Blanche x Tressot Noir | Unknown | Angelique, Argillet, Argilliere, Begeain, Begean, Bon Savoyan, Chetouan, Chetuan, Chintuan, Cintuan, Cotillon des Dames, Gascon, Gneyne, Grand Chetuan, Grand Picot, Grand Picou, Gros Chetuan, Gros Picot, Gros Piquot, Gros Plant, Gros Rouge, Gros Rouge du Pays, Grosse Sirah, Grosse Sirrah, Grosse Syrah, Gueyne, Guyenne, La Same, Languedoc, Largillet, Maldoux, Mandos, Mandouse, Mandoux, Mandouze, Mantouse, Margilien, Margilieux, Margillien, Margillin, Marlanche Noire, Marsanne Noire, Marsanne Ronde, Marve, Maudos, Maudoux, Meximieux, Molette, Molette Noire, Mondeuse, Mondeuse Nera, Mondeuse Rouge, Monteuse, Montouse, Morlanche, Morlanche Noire, Mouteuse, Parcense, Persagne, Persaigne, Persance, Persanne, Petite Persaigne, Pinot Vache, Plant de Savoie, Plant Maldoux, Plant Mandos, Plant Maudos, Plant Medoc, Plant Modo, Plant Modol, Plant Noir, Prossaigne, Refosco, Rouget, Salanaise, Savoe, Savoete, Savouai, Savouette, Savoyan, Savoyanche, Savoyange, Savoyanne, Savoyant, Savoyard, Savoyen, Savoyet, Syrah Grosse, Terran, Terrano, Tinta do Rodo, Tinta Rodo, Tornarin, Tournarin, Tournerin, Vache | |
| Roseira | 50707 | 12497 | N | Unknown | Douro PDO, Península de Setúbal PGI | Tinta Roseira | |
| Rufete | 52106 | 10331 | N | Perepinhao Portalegre x Molar | Bairrada PDO, Beira Atlântico PGI, DoTejo PDO, Douro PDO, Lisboa PGI, Lisboa - Alta-Estremadura PGI, Lisboa - Encostas d'Aire PDO, Lisboa-Estremadura PGI, Península de Setúbal PGI, Porto PDO, Tejo PGI, Terras do Dão PGI Transmontano PGI | Castellana, Penamacor, Pennamaior, Pinot Aigret, Preto Rifete, Rifete, Riffete, Rofete, Rosete, Rosette, Ruceta, Rufeta, Rupeti Berra, Tinta Carvalha, Tinta Pinheira, Tinto Pinheira | |
| Saborinho (See Negra Mole) | | | | | | | |
| Samarim | | 10640 | N | Unknown | | Peleiro, Samarrim | |
| Samarrinho Tinto | | 10642 | N | Unknown | Unknown | Camarrinho Preto, Camarrinho Tinto, Samarrinho Preto | |
| Santarena | | 10698 | N | Black Muscat = Muscat Hamburg x Castelão | Unknown | | |
| Santareno | 52304 | As Étraire de la Dui - 3993 | N | Unknown | Douro PDO, Península de Setúbal PGI | Beccu de l'Aduï, Betu, Étraire, Étraire de la Dot, Étraire de la Dû, Étraire de la Due, Étraire de la Dui, Étraire de la Duï, Étraire de la Duy, Étraire de l'Adny, Gros Persan, Gros Étraire, Grosse Étraire, Santarém, Santareno | |
| São-Saúl | | | N | Unknown | Douro PDO, Península de Setúbal PGI | | |
| Sevilhão | 51403 | As Corbeau - 2826 | N | Unknown | Douro PDO, Península de Setúbal PGI | Alcantino, Aleante, Bathiolin, Batiolin, Blaue Gansfüßer, Bonarda, Bourdon noir, Carbonneau, Charbonneau, Charbono, Corbeau, Corbeau Noir, Cot Merille, Cot Rouge Merille, Cote Rouge, Dolcetto Grosso, Dolutz, Douce Noir, Douce Noire, Folle Noire d L'Ariege, Grenoblois, Korbo, Mauvais Noir, Ocanette, Picot Rouge, Plant de Calarin, Plant de Montmélion, Plant de Savoie, Plant de Turin, Plant Noir, Serbina, Turca, Turino | |
| Shiraz (See Syrah) | | | | | | | |
| Sezão (See also Vinhão) | 51901 | 22984 | N | Unknown | | Sousão, Sousão de Comer, Sousão Forte, Sousão Vermelho, Souzão | |
| Sousão (See Sezao and Vinhão) | | | | | | | |
| Sousão de Comer (See Sezao and Vinhão) | | | | | | | |
| Sousão Douro (See Vinhão) | | | | | | | |
| Sousáo Forte (See Sezao and Vinhão) | | | | | | | |
| Sousão Galego | | 23780 | N | Unknown | Rare (Note: This variety was discovered in the former parish of Gagos (the report lists this as "Gagos de Cima") in the municipality of Celorico de Basto in the Vinhos Verdes region. (p. 55)) | | |
| Sousão Vermelho (See Sezao and Vinhão) | | | | | | | |
| Souzão 02.1 (Note: FPS advises, "This selection was imported to Davis in 1984 by Dr. Harold Olmo (Professor, UC Davis) from the Regua Agricultural Station in the Douro region of Portugal. The original material was named Souzão II and was infected with leafroll virus. The selection underwent microshoot tip tissue culture therapy at FPS in 2007 and successfully completed testing to qualify for the Russell Ranch Foundation Vineyard in 2013." As this variety came from Douro and the date of its importation to UC Davis predated the genetic studies carried out by Castro et al. it seems likely that Souzão 02.1 is actually related to Vinhão.) (See also Vinhão) | | | N | A clone of Sezão or Vinhão? | | | |
| Syrah | | 11748 | N | Mondeuse Blanche x Dureza | Alentejo PDO, Algarve - Tavira - Ave PDO, Bairrada PDO, Beira Atlântico PGI, DoTejo PDO, Duriense PGI, Lagoa PDO, Lisboa PGI, Lisboa - Alenquer PDO, Lisboa - Alta-Estremadura PGI, Lisboa - Arruda PDO, Lisboa - Encostas d'Aire PDO, Lisboa-Estremadura PGI, Lisboa - Óbidos PDO, Lisboa - Torres Vedras PDO, Minho PGI, Palmela PDO, Península de Setúbal PGI, Portimão PDO, Tavira PDO, Tejo PGI, Terras do Dão PGI | Antournerein, Antournerein Noir, Antourenein, Antourenein Noir, Antournerin, Anzher Muskatnyi, Arnitas, Balsamina, Biaune, Biaune Noir, Bione, Blaue Schiraz, Blaue Serine, Blaue Sirah, Blauer Syrah, Bragiola, Candive, Candive Noir, Caudive, Ciras, Costigliola, Costiola, Damas Noir du Puy de Dôme, Damaszener Blau, Di Santi, EntourneIrein, Entournerein, Entournerin, Ermitage, Fresa Grossa, Hermitage, Hignin, Hignin Noir, Marsanne Noir, Marsanne Noire, Neiret di Saluzzo, Neiretta Cunese, Neiretta del Cuneese-Fassanese, Neiretta del Monregalese, Neiretta del Rosso, Neiretta dell'Albese, Neiretta di Saluzzo, Neiretto del Cuneese, Neiretto di Bene, Neiretto di Carru, Neiretto di Costigliole, Neiretto di Farigliano, Neiretto di Saluzzo, Nereta Piccola di Monre-Galese, Neretta Cuneese, Neretta del Cuneese-Fassanese, Neretta del Monregalese, Neretta di Costigliole, Neretta di Saluzzo, Neretta Piccola, Neretta Piccola di Dogliani, Neretto del Beinale, Neretto di Dogliani, Neretto di Saluzzo, Petite Chiras, Petite Sirah, Petite Sirrah, Petite Syrah, Petite Syras, Plan de la Biaune, Plant de Biaune, Plant de la Bianne, Plant de la Biaune, Schiras, Schiraz, Scyras, Seraene, Sereine, Serene, Serenne, Serine, Serine Noir, Serine Noire, Serinne, Sevene, Shiras, Shiraz, Shyrac, Sira, Sirac, Sirah, Sirah de l'Ermitage, Sirah dell'Ermitaggio, Siriaca, Sirrah, Syra, Syrac, Syrac de l'Ermitage, Syracuse, Syrah Crni, Zagarese, Zizak | |
| Tannat | | 12257 | N | Unknown | Alentejo PDO, Beira Atlântico PGI, DoTejo PDO, Duriense PGI, Lisboa PGI, Lisboa-Estremadura PGI, Palmela PDO, Península de Setúbal PGI, Tejo PGI | Bordelais Noir, Bordelez Beltza, Bordeleza Belcha, Harriague, Madiran, Madiron, Mouston, Moustron, Moustrou, Moustroun, Tanat, Tannat Gris, Tannat Noir Femelle, Tannat Noir Male | |
| Teinturier | 53807 | 12304 | N | Savagnin Blanc = Traminer x ? | Duriense PGI, Península de Setúbal PGI | Agreste Noir, Alicante, Auvernas Teint, Auvernat Teint, Avernas Teint, Bajonner, Barbantal, Bayonner, Bettice de l'Isère, Bettue de l'Isère, Black Spanish, Bluttraube, Borgugnon Nigrum, Bourguignon Noir, Bretonneria, Cinq Fois Coloré, Dix Fois Coloré, Egiziano, Fäber, Fäbertraube, Farbtraube, Furber, Garidel, Gros Noir, Gros Noir de Villebarou, Hollertraube, Kis Festoeszoeloe, Kleiner Farber, Maure, Moreau, Nagy Festoeszoeloe, Negrier, Negrin, Meraut, Nerone, Neurat, Nigrier, Noir à Tacher, Noir d'Espagne, Noir d'Orléans, Noiraut, Noireau, Pineau Teinturier, Plant d'Espagne, Plant d'Orléans, Plant de Bois, Plant des Bois, Pontac, Pontak, Pontäo, Pontiac, Portugal, Raisin d'Orléns, Rohrkläner, Rohrklevner, Rome, Rome Noir, Rubintraube, Socco, Tachant, Tachard, Tachat, Tachat du Jura, Tachoir, Teinjurin, Teinse, Teint, Teinteau, Teintevin, Teinturier à Bois Rouge, Teinturier du Cher, Teintirier Femelle, Teinturier Gros Noir, Teinturier Male, Teinturier Maschio, Teinturin, Tenjin, Tinta Francisca, Tintaszoeloe, Tintello, Tintentraube, Tintenwein, Tinto, Tinto di Spagna, Tintorello, Tintous, Tinturie, Tinturin, Uva Tinta, Vin Tint, Vint Tint | |
| Tempranillo Tinto (See Aragonez) | | | | | | | |
| Tinta Águiar | 50703 | 12459 | N | Mourisco Tinto = Marufo x Touriga Nacional | Douro PDO, Península de Setúbal PGI | | |
| Tinta Amarela (See Trincadeira Preta) | | | | | | | |
| Tinta Antiga (See Vinhão) | | | | | | | |
| Tinta Aurélio | 40609 | 17725 | N | Mourisco Tinto = Marufo x Tinta Pomar | Península de Setúbal PGI | Tinta do Aurélio, Tinto do Aurélio | |
| Tinta Barca (See Barca) | | | | | | | |
| Tinta Barroca | 52905 | 12462 | N | Mourisco Tinto = Marufo x Touriga Nacional | Alentejo PDO, Bairrada PDO, Beira Atlântico PGI, DoTejo PDO, Douro PDO, Lisboa PGI, Lisboa - Alenquer PDO, Lisboa - Alta-Estremadura PGI, Lisboa - Arruda PDO, Lisboa-Estremadura PGI, Lisboa - Óbidos PDO, Lisboa - Torres Vedras PDO, Madeirense PDO, Minho PGI, Península de Setúbal PGI, Porto PDO, Tejo PGI, Transmontano PGI, Trás-os-Montes - Chaves PDO, Trás-os-Montes - Planalto Mirandês PDO, Trás-os-Montes - Vàlpaçôs PDO | Baroccas, Barocca, Barroco, Boca de Mina, Tinta Barocca, Tinta das Baroccas, Tinta Gorda, Tinta Grossa, Tinta Vigaria | |
| Tinta Bastardinha (See Alfrocheiro Preto) | | | | | | | |
| Tinta Bragão (See Barreto) | | | | | | | |
| Tinta Caiada | 51905 | As Parraleta - 8951 | N | Unknown | Alentejo PDO, DoTejo PDO, Lisboa PGI, Lisboa-Estremadura PGI, Lisboa-Estremadura PGI, Península de Setúbal PGI, Tejo PGI | Barriadorgia, Barriagorja, Bastardo, Bombedra, Boogastro, Bomvedro, Bonifaccencu, Bonifacienco, Bonifazino, Bonvedro, Bunifazinu, Cacagliola, Carcaghjola Nera, Carcaghjola Neru, Carcaghjola Neru, Carcagiola, Carcagliolu Neru, Carcajiola, Carcajola Noir, Cargajola, Caricagiola, Cua Tendra, Espegnin, Espegnin Noir, False Carignan, Lambrusco de Alentejo, Marota, Monvedro, Monvedro de Sines, Monvedro do Algarve, Monvedro Tinto, Morteira, Murteira, Olho Branco, Paraletta, Parralada, Parrel, Parreleta, Pau Ferro, Perrel, Preto Foz, Preto João Mendes, Ribote, Salceño Negro, Salzenc, Tinta Caiada, Tinta Calada, Tinta da Lameira, Tinto do Lameiro, Tinta Grossa, Tinta Lameira, Tinta Murteira, Tintorro | |
| Tinta Cão (See Tinto Cão) | | | | | | | |
| Tinta Carvalha | 52201 | 12467 | N | Cainho da Terra x Cayetana Blanca = Sarigo | Alentejo PDO, Beira Atlântico PGI, DoTejo PDO, Douro PDO, Lisboa PGI, Lisboa - Alta-Estremadura PGI, Lisboa-Estremadura PGI, Península de Setúbal PGI, Tejo PGI, Transmontano PGI, Trás-os-Montes - Chaves PDO, Trás-os-Montes - Vàlpaçôs PDO | Lobão, Preto Gordo, Tinta Carvalha du Douro | |
| Tinta Castañal (See Mourisco) | | | | | | | |
| Tinta da Barca | 52101 | As Barca - 17359 | N | Mourisco Tinto = Marufo x Touriga Nacional | Douro PDO, Duriense PGI, Península de Setúbal PGI, Transmontano PGI | | |
| Tinta da Bairrada (See Baga) | | | | | | | |
| Tinta da Graciosa (See Graciosa) | | | | | | | |
| Tinta da Madeira, Tinta de Madeira or Tinta Madeira (See Negra Mole) | | | | | | | |
| Tinta da Melra or Tinta Melra (See Melra) | | | | | | | |
| Tinta de Alcobaça | 41504 | As Alcoa - 12475 | N | Grand Noir x Castelão | Unknown (Note: VIVC's records say that this variety was bred in 1948 by Ferreira de Almeida and José Leão at the former Estação Agronómica Nacional (National Agronomic Station), Quinta do Marques, Portugal. Its current use is unrecorded. (Estação Agronómica Nacional.)) | | |
| Tinta de Cidadelhe (See Cidadelhe) | | | | | | | |
| Tinta de Escrever (See Alicante Henri Bouschet) | | | | | | | |
| Tinta de Lisboa | 51108 | 17723 | N | Síria x Trousseau Noir = Bastardo | Lisboa PGI, Lisboa - Alta-Estremadura PGI, Lisboa-Estremadura PGI, Península de Setúbal PGI | Bastardo do Outeiro, Bastardo Espanhol, Bastardo Espanhol Noir, Bastardo Tinto, Tinta Lisboa | |
| Tinta de Parada (See Vinhão) | | | | | | | |
| Tinta de Santiago (See Aragonez) | | | | | | | |
| Tinta Engomada (See Engomada) | | | | | | | |
| Tinta Feijão (See Verdelho Tinto) | | | | | | | |
| Tinta Fina (See Alicante Henri Bouschet) | | | | | | | |
| Tinta Fontes (Note: VIVC lists Tinta Fontes as a variety in its own right. WPL lists Tinta de Fontes as a synonym for Graciano.) | 50706 | 26725 | N | Arinto x Trousseau Noir = Bastardo | Unknown | Tinta de Fontes, Tinta Miúda de Fontes, Tinta Miúda Fontes | |
| Tinta Francisca | 52502 | 15686 | N | Unknown | Beira Atlântico PGI, Douro PDO, Península de Setúbal PGI, Porto PDO, Terras do Dão PGI, Transmontano PGI | Teinturier Mâle, Tinta de França, Tinta Francesca, Tinta Franceza | |
| Tinta Gorda | 50607 | As Mouraton - 8082 | N | Cayetana Blanca = Sarigo x Alfrocheiro Preto | Duriense PGI, Transmontano PGI, Trás-os-Montes - Planalto Mirandês PDO | Cojon de Gato, Collon de Gallo, Collon de Gato, Gorda, Juan García, Malvasia Negra, Mençia Gorda, Negrada Tinta, Negreda, Negreda Preta, Negrera, Négron de Aldán, Nepeda, Tinta Negreda, Tinto Madrid, Villarino | |
| Tinta Grossa | 52906 | As Carrega Tinto - 2125 | N | Hebén = Mourisco Branco x Alfrocheiro Preto | Douro PDO, Península de Setúbal PGI | Carrega Tinto, Grossa, Tinta Grossa, Tinta Grossa d'Alentejo | |
| Tinta Lameira (Note: Parraleta, VIVC and WPL all indicate that Tinta Lameira is a synonym for Parraleta, the Spanish name for what is now listed in CAN as Tinta Caiada. DNA tests in Portugal, Sardinia and Spain on what were originally thought to be different varieties showed that Tinta Caiada, Tinta Lameira and Parraleta were identical. However, in this table Tinta Lameira has been listed separately from Tinta Caiada because some regions have appellation rights with EU under the name Tinta Caiada while Península de Setúbal has rights under both names, and Douro only has rights under Tinta Lameira.) | | As synonym for Parraleta - 8951 | N | Unknown | Douro PDO, Península de Setúbal PGI | Bastardão, Bonifaccencu, Bonifacienco, Bonvedro, Bomvedro, Carenisca, Caricagiola, Bastardo, Cua Tendra, Espagnin Noir, False Carignan, Lambrusco de Alentejo, Monvedro, Monvedro do Algarve, Monvedro de Sines, Murteira, Olho Branco, Parraleta, Parrel, Pau Ferro, Perrel, Preto Foz, Preto João Mendes, Salceño Negro, Tinta Caiada, Tinta Grossa, Tinta Lameira, Tintorro, Torres de Algarve | |
| Tinta Lisboa (See Tinta de Lisboa) | | | | | | | |
| Tinta Malandra (See Malandra) | | | | | | | |
| Tinta Martins | 50602 | 17727 | N | Mourisco Tinto = Marufo x Graciano | Douro PDO, Península de Setúbal PGI | Tinto Martins | |
| Tinta Melra or Tinta da Melra (See Melra) | | | | | | | |
| Tinta Merousa (See Castelão) | | | | | | | |
| Tinta Mesquita | 50604 | 12489 | N | Mourisco Tinto = Marufo x Vinhão | Douro PDO, Península de Setúbal PGI | | |
| Tinta Miúda | | As Graciano - 4935 | N | Arinto x Trousseau Noir = Bastardo | Alentejo PDO, Beira Atlântico PGI, DoTejo PDO, Duriense PGI, Lisboa PGI, Lisboa - Alenquer PDO, Lisboa - Alta-Estremadura PGI, Lisboa - Arruda PDO, Lisboa - Encostas d'Aire PDO, Lisboa-Estremadura PGI, Lisboa - Óbidos PDO, Lisboa - Torres Vedras PDO, Palmela PDO, Península de Setúbal PGI, Tejo PGI | Alicante, Bastardo Nero, Bois Dur, Bordelais, Bovale, Bovaledda, Bovaleddo, Bovaleddu, Bovaleddu Bianea, Bovale Sardo, Bovale Piccolo, Bovale Piticco, Bovale Sardo, Bovali. Bovali Mannu, Bovalis, Bualeddu, Cadelanisca, Cagliunari, Cagniulari, Caglunari, Caglunari Bastardo, Cagnelataat, Cagniulari, Cagnolari Nero, Cagnonale, Cagnolari Nero, Cagnovali, Cagnovali Nero, Cagnulari, Cagnulari Bastardo, Cagnulari Sardo, Cagnulatu, Caldareddhu, Calda Reio, Caldareddhu, Caldareddu, Caldarello, Caldelatta, Cardinissia, Cargo Muol, Carrixa, Casca, Cendron, Charge Mullet, Courouillad, Courouilade, Couthurier, Couturier, Drug, Enfarine, Graciana, Graciano 15-5, Graciano de Haro, Graciano Tinto, Gros Negrette, Grosse Negrette, Jerusano, Karis, Marastel, Maristeddo, Matarou, Materou, Minostello, Minustello, Minustellu, Minustillu, Monastel, Monasteou, Monaster, Monastrell Menudo, Monastrell Verdadero, Moraiola Minore, Morastel, Morastell, Morastell Tannot, Morestel, Moristell, Morrastel, Moura, Mourastel, Mouroustel, Mourrastel, Mrinsky, Murastellu, Muristeddo, Muristeddu, Muristellu, Mustinellu, Negrette de Montaugan, Negrette de Pays, Nieddu Prunizza, Perpignan, Perpigne, Plant de Ledenon, Tanat Gris, Tannat Bordelais, Tannat Gris, Tinta, Tinta de Fontes, Tinta do Padre Antonio, Tinta Fontes, Tinta Mencida, Tinta Menuda, Tintilla de Rota, Tintilho, Tintilla, Tintilla de Rota, Tintillo, Tintillo Alicante, Tintillu, Tinto, Tinto Menudo, Torrentes, Ualda, Uva Cagnelata, Verdadero, Xeres, Xerez, Zinzillosa | |
| Tinta Negra | 51703 | As Molar - 15678 | N | Prieto Picudo Tinto x Savagnin = Traminer | Lisboa PGI, Lisboa-Estremadura PGI, Tejo PGI | Baboso Negro, Boto de Gal, Boto de Gall, Boton de Gallo, Boton de Gallo Negro, Boton de Gato, Botton de Gallo Negro, Folha de Figueira Preta, Molar Preto, Mollar, Moyar, Negra Mole, Negra Mollar, Preto Salmura, Puesto Mayor, Rabo de Ovelha Tinto, Rabo de Ovelha Tinto em Pinhel, Rabo de Ovelha Tinto Pinhel, Ramisco Tinto, Saborinho, Tinta, Tinta da Madeira, Tinta de Madeira, Tinta de Porto Santo, Tinta Madeira, Tinta Mole, Tinta Negra Mole, Tinta Porto Santo, Tinta Sabreirinha, Verdejo Negro, Verdejo Tinto | |
| Tinta Negra Mole (See Negra Mole) | | | | | | | |
| Tina Mole (See Tinta Pomar) | | | | | | | |
| Tinta Penajóia | 51208 | As Peloursin Noir - 9107 | N | Unknown | Douro PDO, Península de Setúbal PGI | Belossard, Blaue Thuner, Chatille, Corsin, Durazaine, Duret, Dureza, Durif, Durif Fourchu, Famette, Feunette, Fumette, Gondran, Gro Nuar, Gronnat, Gronnay, Gros Beclan, Gros Nat, Gros Noir, Gros Noirin, Gros Plant, Mal Noir, Mauvais Noir, Mosaguin, Parlouseau, Parlousseau, Pelaursin, Pellorcin, Pellossard, Pellossard Noir, Pellourcin, Pellorsin, Pelossard, Pelossier, Peloursin, Peloursin Nero, Plant d'Abas, Plant de Paris, Pourret, Pourrot, Saler, Salet, Salis, Schöne Blaue von Quinta, Sella, Soler, Spartin, Thuner, Thuner Rebe, Tinta Penajoia, Tinta Roriz de Penajóia, Tinta Roriz Penajoia, Treillin, Verne, Vert Noir | |
| Tinta Pereira | 50907 | 12491 | N | Unknown | Douro PDO, Península de Setúbal PGI | Tinta Ferreira | |
| Tinta Pinheira (See Rufete) | | | | | | | |
| Tinta Poeirinha (See Baga) | | | | | | | |
| Tinta Pomar | 50807 | 12493 | N | Unknown | DoTejo PDO, Douro PDO, Lisboa PGI, Lisboa-Estremadura PGI, Península de Setúbal PGI, Tejo PGI | Tinta Mole | |
| Tinta Porto Santo (Note: Neither VIVC nor WPL list the variety.) | | | N | Unknown | Península de Setúbal PGI | Tinta do Porto Santo | |
| Tinta Ricoca (See Ricoca) | | | | | | | |
| Tinta Roriz (See Aragonez) | | | | | | | |
| Tinta Roseira (See Roseira) | | | | | | | |
| Tinta Tabuaço | 51307 | As Tinta de Tabuaço - 12482 | N | Unknown | Douro PDO, Península de Setúbal PGI | Tinta de Tabuaço | |
| Tinta Valdosa | 51608 | As Valdosa - 12461 | N | Unknown | Douro PDO, Península de Setúbal PGI | Tinta Baldossa, Valdosa | |
| Tintem | | As Benfica - 1132 | N | Castelão x Alicante Henri Bouschet | Beira Atlântico PGI, Terras do Dão PGI | | |
| Tintinha (Note: VIVC lists this as a variety in its own right with unknown parentage, whereas WPL says it is synonymous with Petit Bouschet with a parentage of Aramon Noir x Teinturier du Cher Under "Tintinha - Red", Wine & Winemakers says, "Tintinha is an unusual and very particular Portuguese grape variety. The true origin is uncertain since it is both synonym for Petit Bouschet and the name of a distinct variety whose DNA profile in Almadanim et al. (2004) is unique." Because this variety has PDO and PGI appellations with EU under its own name, in this table Tintinha is being interpreted as a distinct variety as described in VIVC's entry.) | | 14985 | N | Unknown | DoTejo PDO, Lisboa PGI, Lisboa - Alta-Estremadura PGI, Lisboa-Estremadura PGI, Península de Setúbal PGI, Tejo PGI | Leão Ferreira da Almeida 11-48-122 | |
| Tinto (See Vinhão) | | | | | | | |
| Tinto Cão | | 12500 | N | Unknown | Alentejo PDO, Bairrada PDO, Beira Atlântico PGI, DoTejo PDO, Douro PDO, Lisboa PGI, Lisboa - Alta-Estremadura PGI, Lisboa-Estremadura PGI, Palmela PDO, Península de Setúbal PGI, Porto PDO, Tejo PGI, Terras do Dão PGI, Trás-os-Montes - Chaves PDO, Trás-os-Montes - Vàlpaçôs PDO | Castellana Negra, Farmento, Farnento, Teinta Cam, Tinta Cam, Tintilla Castellan, Tinto Cam, Tinto Cão (The other common name) | |
| Tinto de Pegões | | 12503 | N | Castelão x Alicante Henri Bouschet | Unknown | | |
| Tinto Martins (See Tinta Martins) | | | | | | | |
| Tinto Mata (See Tinto Cão) | | | | | | | |
| Tinto Nacional (See Verdial Tinto) | | | | | | | |
| Tinto Sem Nome | | 17728 | N | Unknown | Douro PDO, Península de Setúbal PGI | Tinta Coimbra, Tinta Sem Nome, Touriga Brasileira, Tourigo Fêmea | |
| Touriga Fêmea | | 12592 | N | Touriga Nacional x Malvasia Fina | Duriense PGI, Península de Setúbal PGI, Terras do Dão PGI, Transmontano PGI | Tinta Coimbra, Touriga Brasileira, Tourigo Fêmea | |
| Touriga Franca | 52205 | 12593 | N | Touriga Nacional x Mourisco Tinto = Marufo | Alentejo PDO, Bairrada PDO, Beira Atlântico PGI, DoTejo PDO, Douro PDO, Lagoa PDO, Lisboa PGI, Lisboa - Alenquer PDO, Lisboa - Alta-Estremadura PGI, Lisboa - Arruda PDO, Lisboa - Encostas d'Aire PDO, Lisboa-Estremadura PGI, Lisboa - Óbidos PDO, Lisboa - Torres Vedras PDO, Madeirense PDO, Palmela PDO, Península de Setúbal PGI, Porto PDO, Setúbal PDO, Tejo PGI, Terras do Dão PGI, Transmontano PGI, Trás-os-Montes - Chaves PDO, Trás-os-Montes - Planalto Mirandês PDO, Trás-os-Montes - Vàlpaçôs PDO | Albino de Souza, Touriga Frances, Touriga Francesa, Tourigo Francês | |
| Touriga Nacional | | | N | Unknown | DoTejo PDO, Douro PDO, Lagoa PDO, Lagos PDO, Lisboa PGI, Lisboa - Alenquer PDO, Lisboa - Alta-Estremadura PGI, Lisboa - Arruda PDO, Lisboa - Encostas d'Aire PDO, Lisboa-Estremadura PGI, Lisboa - Óbidos PDO, Lisboa - Torres Vedras PDO, Madeirense PDO, Minho PGI, Palmela PDO, Portimão PDO, Porto PDO, Península de Setúbal PGI, Setúbal PDO, Tavira PDO, Tejo PGI, Terras do Dão PGI, Transmontano PGI, Trás-os-Montes - Chaves PDO, Trás-os-Montes - Planalto Mirandês PDO, Trás-os-Montes - Vàlpaçôs PDO | Azal Espanhol, Bical, Bical Tinto, Carabuñera, Mortágua, Mortágua Preto, Preto Mortágua, Toiriga, Touriga, Touriga Femea, Touriga Fina, Touriga National, Tourigao, Tourigo, Tourigo Antigo, Tourigo Antiguo, Tourigo do Dão, Touringa, Touriva, Turiga | |
| Tourigo (See Alvarelhão) | | | | | | | |
| Transâncora | | 17734 | N | Unknown | Península de Setúbal PGI | | |
| Trigueira | | 17250 | Rg | Unknown | Unknown | | |
| Trincadeira Preta | | 15684 | N | Unknown | Alentejo PDO, Algarve - Tavira - Ave PDO, Beira Atlântico PGI, DoTejo PDO, Douro PDO, Lagos PDO, Lisboa PGI, Lisboa - Alenquer PDO, Lisboa - Alta-Estremadura PGI, Lisboa - Arruda PDO, Lisboa - Encostas d'Aire PDO, Lisboa-Estremadura PGI, Lisboa - Óbidos PDO, Lisboa - Torres Vedras PDO, Minho PGI, Palmela PDO, Portimão PDO, Porto PDO, Setúbal PDO, Tejo PGI, Terras do Dão PGI, Transmontano PGI, Trás-os-Montes - Chaves PDO Trás-os-Montes - Planalto Mirandês PDO, Trás-os-Montes - Vàlpaçôs PDO | Black Alicante, Black Portugal, Castelão de Cova da Beira, Castico, Castico Pret0, Crato Preto, Crato Tinto, Espadeiro, Espadeiro de Setúbal, Espadeiro do Sul, Espadeiro Tinto, Folha de Abobora, Malvasia, Moreto Mortagua, Mortagua, Mortagua Preto, Mourisco Branco, Mourisco Branco Noir, Mourisco Vero, Mourteira, Mourteiro, Murteira, Negreda, Padeiro Bravo, Portugal, Preto Martinho, Preto Rifete, Rabo de Ovelha Tinto, Rifete, Rosete Espalhado, Rosete Espanhol, Tinta Amarela, Tinta Amarelha, Tinta Amarella, Tinta Ameralha, Tinta Carvallera, Tinta Manuola, Torneiro, Trincadeira | |
| Triunfo | | 12658 | N | Castelão x Black Muscat = Muscat Hamburg | Unknown | | |
| Trousseau Noir (See Bastardo) | | | | | | | |
| Uva de Rei (See Marufo) | | | | | | | |
| Valbom | | 12858 | N | Castelão x Alicante Henri Bouschet | DoTejo PDO, Lisboa PGI, Lisboa-Estremadura PGI, Tejo PGI | | |
| Valdosa (See Tinta Valdosa) | | | | | | | |
| Varejoa | | 12498 | N | Unknown | Douro PDO, Península de Setúbal PGI | Tinta Varejoa | |
| Verdelho Feijão | | 12956 | N | Unknown | Unknown | Feijão | |
| Verdelho Quelho | | 25087 | N | Unknown | Rare (Note: This variety was discovered in the former parish of Bairros in the municipality of Castelo de Paiva in the Vinhos Verdes region. (p. 55)) | | |
| Verdelho Tinto | | As Verdelho Tinto - 12957 | N | Unknown | Madeira PDO, Minho PGI, Península de Setúbal PGI | Feijão, Mindesco, Miudesso, Verdelho, Verdelho Feijão | |
| Verdial Tinto | | 23217 | N | Unknown | Minho PGI, Península de Setúbal PGI (Note: WPL cites a source saying that no plantings were reported in 2016.) | Verdial Douro, Verdial Roxo | |
| Verdot Petit | | 12974 | N | Unknown | Alentejo PDO, Beira Atlântico PGI, DoTejo PDO, Duriense PGI, Lisboa PGI, Lisboa - Alta-Estremadura PGI, Lisboa-Estremadura PGI, Palmela PDO, Península de Setúbal PGI, Tejo PGI | Bonton Blanc, Bouton, Carmelin, Heran, Lambrusquet, Lambrusquet Noir, Peti Verdo, Petit Verdau, Petit Verdot, Petit Verdot Nero, Petit Verdot Noir, Plant de Paulus, Verdau, Verdot, Verdot Rouge | |
| Vinhão (See also Sezao | | 13100 | N | Unknown | Beira Atlântico PGI, DoTejo PDO, Douro PDO, Lisboa PGI, Lisboa - Alta-Estremadura PGI, Lisboa-Estremadura PGI, Minho PGI, Península de Setúbal PGI, Tejo PGI, Terras do Dão PGI, Transmontano PGI, Vinho Verde PDO, Vinho Verde - Amarante PDO, Vinho Verde - Ave PDO, Vinho Verde - Baião PDO, Vinho Verde - Basto PDO, Vinho Verde - Cávado PDO, Vinho Verde - Lima PDO, Vinho Verde - Paiva PDO, Vinho Verde - Sousa PDO | Azal Tinto, Caino Gordo, Espadeiro Basto, Espadeiro da Tinta, Espadeiro de Basto, Espadeiro do Basto, Espadeiro Preto, Loureira Tinta, Negrão, Negrão Pé de Perdiz, Negron, Pazão, Pé de Perdiz, Pinhão, Pinta Fêmea, Retinto, Sesão, Sousao, Sousão, Sousão de Correr, Sousão do Douro, Sousão Forte, Sousen, Sousón, Sousón Retinto, Souza, Souzam, Souzao, Souzão, Souzão Forte, Souzón Retinto, Tinta, Tinta Antigua, Tinta de Luzin, Tinta Fêmea, Tinta Nacional, Tinta País, Tinta Pais, Tintilla, Tinto, Tinto Antigo, Tinto da Parada, Tinto do Parada, Tinto Nacional, Verdello Tinto, Vermelha, Vinon | |
| Xara | | 15629 | N | Unknown | Beira Atlântico PGI, Península de Setúbal PGI | | |
| Zé do Telheiro | | 17738 | N | Unknown | Península de Setúbal PGI | | |
| Zinfandel (See Primitivo) | | | | | | | - |

=== White varieties ===
Abbreviations

- CAN - Coleção Ampelográfica Nacional (National Ampelographic Collection)
- Colour of Berry Skin – B (blanc – yellow or green)
- FPS – Foundation Plant Service Grape Registry
- ha - hectare, a measurement of land area
- NCVV – '"Catálogo Nacional de Variedades de Videira" (National Catalogue of Vine Varieties)
- VIVC – Vitis International Variety Catalogue
- WPL – Wein.Plus Lexicon

| Grape | NCVV Ref No | VIVC Ref No | Colour of Berry Skin | Pedigree | Region | International Homonyms and Synonyms |
|---|---|---|---|---|---|---|
| Abelhal | | 12 | B | Unknown | Unknown | |
| Academica | | 40 | B | Black Muscat = Muscat Hamburg x Castelão | Unknown | |
| Agulha | | 129 | B | Fernão Pires x Sultana Moscata | Unknown | |
| Albariño (See Alvarinho) | | | | | | |
| Alfrocheiro Branco (See Trebbiano Toscano) | | | | | | |
| Alicante Branco (See also Boal de Alicante Moscatel) | 50711 | As Planta Fina - 9542 | B | Hebén = Mourisco Branco x ? | Unknown | Planta Fina |
| Almafra | 52313 | 5191 | B | Síria x Malvasia Fina | DoTejo PDO, Lisboa PGI, Lisboa - Alta-Estremadura PGI, Lisboa-Estremadura PGI, Península de Setúbal PGI, Tejo PGI | Almafre |
| Almanhaca (See Dedo de Dama) | | | | | | |
| Alva (See Síria) | | | | | | |
| Alvadurão | 52114 | 20806 | B | Unknown | Lisboa PGI, Lisboa - Alta-Estremadura PGI, Lisboa-Estremadura PGI, Península de Setúbal PGI, Tejo PGI | |
| Alvadurão do Dão (See Síria) | | | | | | |
| Alvar Branco | | 363 | B | Unknown | Beira Atlântico PGI, DoTejo PDO, Península de Setúbal PGI, Terras do Dão PGI | Alvar |
| Alvaraça or Alvaraça Branco (see Batoca) | | | | | | |
| Alvarega | | 2088 | B | Unknown | Rare (Note: VIVC says there were 73 ha planted in Portugal in 1989.) | Alvarega di Ozieri, Arvarega, Bariadorgia, Bariadorgia Bianca, Bariadorza, Barria Dorgia, Barriadorgia, Barriadorgia Bianca, Barriadorja, Barriadorza, Carcaghiolu, Carcaghijola Bianca, Cracaghjiolu Biancu, Carcagliolu, Carcajola, Carcojolo Bianco, Carcajolo Blanc, Cargajola Blanc, Erbisedda, Fragrante, Gregu Bianco, Praecox, Variatoghja, Verzolina Bianca |
| Alvarelhão Branco (See Touriga Branca, Touriga Franca and Planta Nova | | | | | | |
| Alvarinho | 52007 | 15689 | B | Montúa = Diagalves x Sercial (Note: WPL says DNA testing shows that this variety has a close relationship with Loureiro) | Alentejo PDO, Beira Atlântico PGI, DoTejo PDO, Lisboa PGI, Lisboa - Alenquer PDO, Lisboa - Alta-Estremadura PGI, Lisboa-Estremadura PGI, Lisboa - Óbidos PDO, Lisboa - Torres Vedras PDO, Minho PGI, Palmela PDO, Península de Setúbal PGI, Tejo PGI, Terras do Dão PGI, Trás-os-Montes - Chaves PDO, Vinho Verde PDO, Vinho Verde - Monção e Melgaço PDO | Albariña, Albariño, Albelleiro, Alvarin Blanco, Alvarinha, Azal Blanco, Cainho Branco, Galego, Galeguinho, Padernã |
| Alvarinho Lilás | 40701 | 372 | B | Montúa = Diagalves x Uva Cão | Madeirense PDO, Península de Setúbal PGI | Alvarinho Liláz |
| Alvaroça (See Batoca) | | | | | | |
| Antão Vaz | 52316 | 493 | B | Cayetana Blanca = Sarigo x João Domingos | Alentejo PDO, Beira Atlântico PGI, DoTejo PDO, Lisboa PGI, Lisboa - Alta-Estremadura PGI, Lisboa-Estremadura PGI, Lisboa - Óbidos PDO, Palmela PDO, Setúbal PDO, Tejo PGI | Antonio Vaz |
| Arinto (See also Malvasia Fina and Loureiro) | 52311 | 602 | B | Unknown | Açores - Biscoitos PDO, Açores - Graciosa PDO, Açores - Pico PDO, Alentejo PDO, Algarve - Tavira - Ave PDO, Bairrada PDO, Beira Atlântico PGI, DoTejo PDO, Douro PDO, Lagoa PDO, Lagos PDO, Lisboa PGI, Lisboa - Alenquer PDO, Lisboa - Alta-Estremadura PGI, Lisboa - Arruda PDO, Lisboa - Bucelas PDO, Lisboa - Carcavelos PDO, Lisboa - Encostas d'Aire PDO, Lisboa-Estremadura PGI, Lisboa - Óbidos PDO, Lisboa - Torres Vedras PDO, Minho PGI, Palmela PDO, Portimão PDO, Porto PDO, Setúbal PDO, Tavira PDO, Tejo PGI, Terras do Dão PGI, Transmontano PGI, Trás-os-Montes - Chaves PDO, Trás-os-Montes - Vàlpaçôs PDO, Vinho Verde PDO, Vinho Verde - Amarante PDO, Vinho Verde - Ave PDO, Vinho Verde - Baião PDO, Vinho Verde - Basto PDO, Vinho Verde - Cávado PDO, Vinho Verde - Lima PDO, Vinho Verde - Paiva PDO, Vinho Verde - Sousa PDO, | Arintho, Arintho du Dao, Arinto Cachudo, Arinto Cercial, Arinto d'Anadia, Arinto de Bucelas, Arinto do Dão (Also another name for Malvasia Fina), Arinto do Douro, Arinto Galego, Asal Espanhol (Also a synonym for Batoca), Asal Galego, Assario Branco, Boal Cachudo, Espanhol, Cerceal, Chapeludo, Malvasia Fina (Although Malvasia Fina is a variety in its own right, Arinto is often mistakenly identified as it), Pe de Perdiz Branco, Pedernã, Pedernão, Pedrena, Terrantez de Terceira, Torrontes, Val de Arinto |
| Arinto Branco (See Dorinto and Loureiro) | | | | | | |
| Arinto de Alcobaça (See Bical) | | | | | | |
| Arinto de Bucelas (See Arinto) | | | | | | |
| Arinto de Tras-os-Montes (See Arinto do Interior) | | | | | | |
| Arinto do Douro (See Arinto do Interior and Dorinto) | | | | | | |
| Arinto do Dão (See Malvasia Fina) | | | | | | |
| Arinto do Interior | 51412 | 17362 | B | ? x Savagnin Blanc = Traminer | Beira Atlântico PGI, Duriense PGI, Península de Setúbal PGI, Terras do Dão PGI | Arinto de Tras-Os-Montes, Arinto do Douro |
| Arinto dos Açores (Note: While VIVC lists this as a variety in its own right, WPL lists it only as a synonym for Sercial and Terrantez da Terceira.) | 51412 | 40707 | B | Unknown | | Arinto do Pico, Terrantes da Terceira, Terrantez, Terrantez da Terceira |
| Arinto Galego (See Malvasia Fina) | | | | | | |
| Arinto Gordo (See Tamarez) | | | | | | |
| Arnsburger | | 630 | B | Müller-Thurgau x Chasselas Blanc | Madeirense PDO, Península de Setúbal PGI | Arns Burguer, Arnsburguer, Geisenheim 22-74, GM 22-74 |
| Assaraky | 40404 | As Assaraka - 713 | B | Malvasia Fina x Rosaki = Chaouch Blanc | Beira Atlântico PGI, Terras do Dão PGI | Assaraka |
| Assario (See Malvasia Rei) | | | | | | |
| Assario Branco (See Malvasia Fina) | | | | | | |
| Avesso | 52310 | 798 | B | Unknown | Douro PDO, Minho PGI, Península de Setúbal PGI, Vinho Verde PDO Vinho Verde - Amarante PDO, Vinho Verde - Baião PDO, Vinho Verde - Paiva PDO, Vinho Verde - Sousa PDO | Bornal, Bornão, Borracal Branco, Borral, Jaén Blanco de Andalucia |
| Azal | 52809 | As Azal Branco - 815 | B | Unknown | Beira Atlântico PGI, Lisboa - Encostas d'Aire PDO, Minho PGI, Península de Setúbal PGI, Vinho Verde PDO, Vinho Verde - Amarante PDO, Vinho Verde - Baião PDO, Vinho Verde - Basto PDO, Vinho Verde - Sousa PDO | Asal, Asal Branco, Asal da Lixa, Azal, Azal Branco, Azal da Lixa, Carvalha, Carvalhal, Es Pinheira, Espinheira, Gadelhudo, Pinheira |
| Azal Espanhol (See Arinto) | | | | | | |
| Azal Galego (See Arinto) | | | | | | |
| Azal Santo Tirso | | As Azal Sto Tirso - 25081 | B | Unknown | Rare (Note: This variety was discovered in the parish of Refojos de Riba de Ave in the municipality of Santo Tirso in the Vinhos Verdes region. (p. 55)) | |
| Babosa (See Malvasia Babosa and Folha de Figueira) | | | | | | |
| Babosa Blanca or Babosa Blanco (See Sarigo) | | | | | | |
| Barcelo | 52407 | 980 | B | Azal x Amaral | Beira Atlântico PGI, Península de Setúbal PGI, Terras do Dão PGI, | Barcello, Barcelos |
| Barranquesa (See Carrega Branco) | | | | | | |
| Bastardo Branco | 51117 | 1026 | B | Unknown | Península de Setúbal PGI | Bastardo Branca |
| Batalhinha (See Boal Espinho) | | | | | | |
| Batoca | 52507 | 1037 | B | Unknown | Douro PDO, Minho PGI, Península de Setúbal PGI,/> Vinho Verde PDO, Vinho Verde - Basto PDO | Alvadurão Portalegre, Alvaraça, Alvaraça Branco, Alvarça, Alvaroça, Alvaroço, Asal Espanhol (Also a synonym for Arinto, Blanca Mar, Blanca Mantilla, Espadeiro Branco (No connection to the red variety Espadeiro or subvariety Espadeiro Branco), Sa Douro, Sedouro |
| Beba | 51808 | 22710 | B | Hebén = Mourisco Branco x ? | Douro PDO, Península de Setúbal PGI | Abeaci, Abeaci Blanca, Abeacin Blanca, Abeicin Blanco, Abuqui Verdal, Agaloppo di Jerzu, Ain el Kelb, Ain Kelb, Albacanna, Alloppu, Angiola, Apesorgia Bianca, Ascot Royal, Augevin, Augibi, Autsebi, Autsib, Axina de Angelus, Axina de Angiulus, Axinangelus, Beba de Huelva, Beba de Jaén, Beba de Jerez, Beba de los Santos, Beba de los Santos de Maimona, Beba de Palos, Beba Dorada, Beba Dorada de Huelva, Beba Dorada de Jaén, Beba Dorada de Jerez, Bebas, Beva, Bevah, Bevan, Blanca de Mesa, Blanca Superior de Parral, Blanca Superior para Parral, Blanca Superior Parral, Boal de Praça, Boutayoz, Breval, Butayol, Calop, Calop Blanca, Calop Blanco, Calop Mallorqui, Calop Rojo, Carrega Sumeres, Cedoti, Centi, Ceoti, Chelva, Chelva Blanca, Cinti, Ciuti, Coerbei, Colgariega, Colgariegas, Corazon de Angel, Croquant Blanc, Cruijedero, Crujidero, Crujidero Blanc, Datilera, Datilera Blanca, Espagnol Feher, Eva, Eva de los Santos, Eva de los Santos de Maimona, Festeqi, Festequi, Galoppo, Galoppu, Grosse Panse, Grumer, Grumer Blanc, Grumet, Grumier, Grumier Blanco, Grumiere Blanco, ISO, Jaumes, Jaumet, Jerez Fina, Jerez Fino, Lairen, Lanjaron, Lanxaron, Lardot, Larga, Loja, Malaga, Malvasia de la Cartuja, Malvasiya Shartres, Malvoisie de la Chartreuse, Malvoisie des Chartreux, Manchega, Mantua, Mantua Perruna, Mantuda, Mantuo, Mantuo de Granada, Mantuo Jerezano, Mateo, Mateu, Messeguera Commun, Moqrani, Muagur, Muagur Blanc d'Espagne, Muagur Blanc de Sardaigne, Muscat d'Espagne, Muscat Sefrou, Nasco, Occhivi, Olivette de Cadenet, Palop, Palop Dulce, Paloppo, Palot, Pansa, Pansa Larga, Panse, Panse Blanche, Panse Blanco, Panse Commune, Pansa d'Espagne, Panse d'Espagne Blanche, Panse de Provence, Panse de Rouquevaire, Panse Gruen, Panse Jaune, Panse Valenciana, Panse Valenciano, Panzale ula Tirso, Paphly, Pasa Larga, Passerille Blanche, Pecho de Perdiz, Perruno, Petracine, Petricine, Pontocorvo Grogellone, Porto Farina, Praca, Praça, Pranta, Punxo Gros, Raisin de Notre-Dame, Raisin Notre-Dame, Reale d'Ascot Bianco, Regina di Pontecorvo, Reisentraube, Saint Sebastien, Saint Sebastien Blanc, Sant Jaume, Serotina, Spanier Weiss, Taloppo, Tebourbi, Tenerife, Tenerife de Cadenet, Tenerife de Vaucluse, Tenerife de Vaucluse, Tenerife Olivette de Cadenet, Teneron, Teneron de Cadenet, Teneron de Vaucluse, Teneron di Vaucluse, Teneron du Vaucluse, Teneron Olivette de Cadenet, Teta da Vaca, Trobbat Blanco, Uva degli Angeli, Uva de Pasa, Uva de Planta, Uva degli Angeli, Uva del Rey, Uva Rey, Valdeores, Valenci, Valenci Blanc, Valencí Blanco, Valenci Real, Valencia, Valencia Aledo, Valenciana Blanca, Valenciana Ceuti, Valenciana Real, Valencyn Crujidero, Valensi, Valensi Royal, Valensy, Valensy Real, Verdello, Viduena Blanca, Vinater, Vinyater, White Malaga, Zurumi |
| Bical | 52016 | 1568 | B | Malvasia Fina x ? | Alentejo PDO, Bairrada PDO, Beira Atlântico PGI, DoTejo PDO, Douro PDO, Lisboa PGI, Lisboa - Alta-Estremadura PGI, Lisboa - Encostas d'Aire PDO, Lisboa-Estremadura PGI, Península de Setúbal PGI, Tejo PGI, Terras do Dão PGI, Trás-os-Montes - Chaves PDO, Trás-os-Montes - Planalto Mirandês PDO, Trás-os-Montes - Vàlpaçôs PDO | Arinto de Alcobaça, Barada da Mosca, Barrados das Moscas, Bical de Bairrada, Borrado das Moscas, Fernão Pires do Galego, Fernão Pires Galego, Pedro, Pintado da Moscas, Pintado dos Pardais, Torrontes (Also a synonym for Arinto) |
| Boais (see Boal Branco) | | | | | | |
| Boal Barriero | | 1476 | B | Unknown | Península de Setúbal PGI | |
| Boal Branco (See also Malvasia Fina) | 52116 | 1478 | B | Malvasia Fina x Dedo de Dama | DoTejo PDO, Douro PDO, Lisboa PGI, Lisboa - Alta-Estremadura PGI, Lisboa - Encostas d'Aire PDO, Lisboa-Estremadura PGI, Península de Setúbal PGI, Tejo PGI, Trás-os-Montes - Chaves PDO, Trás-os-Montes - Planalto Mirandês PDO, Trás-os-Montes - Vàlpaçôs PDO | Boal Branco do Algarve, Boal Cachudo, Boal Calhariz, Boal de Alicante, Boal de Calhariz, Boal de Madere, Boal na Madera, Boais, Bual, Malvasia Fina, Semilão |
| Boal Cachudo (See Boal de Alicante Moscatel and Malvasia Fina) | | | | | | |
| Boal Carrasquenho (See Sarigo) | | | | | | |
| Boal de Alicante Moscatel | | 1481 | B | Boal x Muscat of Alexandria | PDO Alentejo, DoTejo PDO, Douro PDO, Lisboa PGI, Lisboa - Alenquer PDO, Lisboa - Arruda PDO, Lisboa - Alta-Estremadura PGI, Lisboa - Encostas d'Aire PDO, Lisboa-Estremadura PGI, Lisboa - Óbidos PDO, Lisboa - Torres Vedras PDO, Península de Setúbal PGI, Tejo PGI, Terras do Dão PGI | Alicante Bouschet, Alicante Branco, Alicante Henri Bouschet, Beldi, Boal Cachudo, Boal de Alicante, Branco Conceição, Damaschena, Damaschina, Damaschino, Farana, Faranah, Farranah, Mayorquen, Majorquin, Mayorcain, Mayorkin, Mayorquen, Mayorquen Blanc, Mayorquin Blanc, Pérola, Planta Fina, Planta Fina de Pedralba, Planta Pedralba, Spagnol, Valencí |
| Boal de Praça (See Beba) | | | | | | |
| Boal de Santarém (See Santoal) | | | | | | |
| Boal Doce (See Ratinho) | | | | | | |
| Boal Espinho | 52017 | 14154 | B | Hebén = Mourisco Branco x Malvasia Fina | DoTejo PDO, Lisboa PGI, Lisboa - Alta-Estremadura PGI, Lisboa-Estremadura PGI, Península de Setúbal PGI, Tejo PGI | Batalhinha |
| Boal Prior (See Tamarez) | | | | | | |
| Boal Ratinho (See Ratinho) | | | | | | |
| Boal Vencedor (See Vencedor) | | | | | | |
| Borrado das Moscas (See Bical) | | | | | | |
| Branca de Anadia | 50314 | 442 | B | Fernão Pires x Montúa = Diagalves | Beira Atlântico PGI, | Anadia Branca, H-1-49-80 |
| Branco Conceição (See Boal de Alicante Moscatel) | | | | | | |
| Branco de Guimarães (See Branco Guimarães) | | | | | | |
| Branco Desconhecido | | 17659 | B | Unknown | Península de Setúbal PGI | |
| Branco Escola (See Pintosa) | | | | | | |
| Branco Espanhol (See Arinto) | | | | | | |
| Branco Especial | 51216 | As Madeleine Royale - 7068 | B | Pinot (Note: The exact identity of this Pinot has not been established; but considering that Branco Especial is a white variety and its second parent, Schiava Grossa is a red, the first parent could be assumed to be Pinot Blanc.) x Trollinger = Schiava Grossa | Douro PDO, Península de Setúbal PGI | Branco Especial, Especial Branco, Königliche Magdalenentraube, Royal Magdalenentanie, Maddaleina Royal, Maddalena Reale, Madeleine Impériale, Madlen Blond, Madlen Roial, Madlen Roiyal, Madlen Royal, Madlen Korolevskaia, Madlen Roial, Madlen Roiyal, Madlen Royal, Madlenka Kralovska, Magdalena Kralovska, Magdalena Real, Magdalene Real, Magdalenka Kralovska, Magdalenka Kralyurska, Plant du Caporal |
| Branco Gouvães (See also Touriga Branca) | 41105 | 17657 | B | Unknown | Península de Setúbal PGI | Alvarelhão Branco, Branco de Gouvães, Touriga Branca |
| Branco Guimarães | 51018 | 17658 | B | Rabigato x Castellana Blanca | Douro PDO, Península de Setúbal PGI | Branco de Guimarães |
| Branco João or Branco Sr. João | | 17660 | B | Unknown | Unknown (Note: WPL says this variety was "cultivated in tiny amounts in the Centro and Norte regions" and cited a source saying that 0.2 ha of vines were reported in 2016.) | Branco Sr. João |
| Branco Lameiro (See Lameiro) | | | | | | |
| Branco sem Nome (See Ratinho) | | | | | | |
| Branco Valente | 40502 | As Heunisch Weiß - 5374 | B | Unknown | Douro PDO, Península de Setúbal PGI | 224 synonyms including Absenger, Bauernweinbeer, Bauernweinbeer Weiße, Bauernweintraube, Belina, Belina Debela, Belina Domaca, Belina Drobna, Belina Krupna, Belina Plslavacka, Belina Pikasta, Belina Stara, Belina Starinska, Belina Starohrvatska, Belina Velika Bijela, Benila Welka, Belina Zuta, Bellina, Bests Nº 4, Bettschisser, Blanc de Serres, Blanció, Boarde, Bogatyur, Bon Blanc, Bordenauer, Borzenauer, Bouillan, Bouillaud, Bouilleaud, Bouillen, Bouillenc, Bourgeois, Bourgignon, Branco Gigante, Branestraube, Braun, Braun Traube, Braune, Burgegger, BurgeggerWeißer, Burger, Cagnou, Champagner Langstielig, Colle, Coulis, Dickweiße, Dickweißer, Dickwiss, Elbe Saurer, Enfariné Blanc, Esslinger, Fejer Szozeloe, Figuier, Flour White, Foirard, Foirard Blanc, Frankenthaler, Gau, Gauche Blanc, Gemeine Weiße Traube, Gigante, Gigante Branco, Goe, Goet, Goez, Gohet, Goi, Goin, Goix, Gôt, Gouai, Gouais, Gouais Blanc, Gouais Jaune, Gouais Long, Gouais Rond, Gouas, Gouaulx, Gouay, Gouche, Gouche Blanche, Goue, Gouest Sauge, Gouet Blanc, Gouette, Gouge, Gouget Blanc, Gouillaud, Gouis de Mardeuil, Gousse, Goys, Graubuensch, Grauhuensch, Grises Blanc, Grobe, Grobe Saurer, Grobes, Grobes Saures, Grobhuensch, Grobwein, Grobweiße, Grobweißer, Gros Blanc, Gueuche Blanc, Gwäss, Hajnos, Hensch, Heunisch, Heinisch, Heinsch, Hensch, Hentschler, Heunisch Weiß, Grünling, Guache, Guay Jaune, Gueche Blanc, Guest Salviatum, Gueche Blanc, Guilan, Guillan, Guinlan, Guy, Guy Blanc, Gwäß, Haehnisch, Hajnos, Hartuensch, Heinisch, Heinish, Heinsch, Heinschen, Heinschen Weiß, Henisch, Hennische Weiß, Hensch, Heunisch, Heunisch Blanc, Heunisch Weißer, Heunischen Gruene, Heunischer, Heunscher, Heunschler, Hinschen, Hinschene, Hintsch, Huensch, Huenschene, Huentsch, Hunnentraube, Hunsch, Hünsch, Hunschrebe, Huntsch, Hynsch, Hyntsch, Isadora Nobilis, Isadortraube Edle, Issol, Kleinbeer, Kleinberger, Kleinberger Saurer, Krapinska Belina, Laxiertraube, Lisoera, Liseiret, Lisoera, Lisora, Lissora, Lombard Blanc, Luxiertraube, Malvasir, Mehlweisse, Mehlweisse Gruen, Mendic, Moreau Blanc, Mouillet, Nargouet, Nargouet Enfariné, Pendrillart Blanc, Perveiral, Perveiral Bianco, Petit Gouge, Pichons, Pikanina Bijela, Plant de Séchex, Plant Madame, Plant Seche, Président, Preveiral, Preveiral Bianco, Preveiral Blanco, Proveiral, Provereau Blanc, Pruvera, Rebula Old, Rebula Stara, Regalaboue, Riesling Grob, Rous Hette, Roussaou Blanc, Rudeca Belina, Saboule Boey, Sadoulo Bouyer, Squarer, Scheißtraube, Schilcher, Seestock Grob, Stajerska Belina, Stara Hrvatska Belina, Stock Deutscher, Thalburger, Thalburger Grünling, Trompe Bouvier, Trompe Valt, Valente, Verdet, Verdin Blanc, Vionnier, Vitis Cathartica, Weinstock Deutscher, Weiße Aechte, Weiße Gemeine, Weiße Grob, Weiße Ordinaere, Weiße Traube, Weißer Heinisch, Weißer Heunisch, Weißgrobe, Weißer Heunische, Weißerheunisch, Weißgrobe, Weißheinisch, Weißstock, Weißtock, Wellina, White Zapfner, Wippacher, Wolschestraube, Zapner Weisser, Zoeld Hajnos |
| Branda | 52117 | 17676 | B | Unknown | Douro PDO, Península de Setúbal PGI, Transmontano PGI | Alvaro de Soire. Alvaro de Sousa, Boal, Boal Cachudo, Colhao de Gallo, Dame Blanche, Dona Blanca, Dona Branca, Dona Branco no Dão, Graciosa, Gracioso, Graziolo, Jampal, Malvasia, Malvasia Branca, Malvasia Grosso, Moza Fresca, Pinheira Branca, Roupeiro, Santo Estêvão, Voal Cachudo, Voal Esparrapado |
| Branquinha (See Trebbiano Toscano) | | | | | | |
| Budelho (See Samarrinho | | | | | | |
| Cachorrinho (See Uva Cão) | | | | | | |
| Caíño Blanco | | 371 | B | A natural crossing of Caíño Bravo = Amaral x Albarino = Alvarhino | Minho PGI, Península de Setúbal PGI | |
| Caracol | 50914 | 17664 | B | Unknown | Península de Setúbal PGI | Cedres, Olho de Pargo, Uva das Eiras |
| Caraméla (Note: WPL says this variety possibly originated from Portugal and cites a source saying that 0.5 ha were reported in 2016.) | 51016 | As Luglienga Bianca - 6982 | B | Unknown | Douro PDO, Península de Setúbal PGI | Agliana, Agostenga, Agostenga di Aosta, Algiana, Augustaner, Augustaner Uese, Augustaner Weiß, Augustauer, Belga Seidentraube, Belle Alliance, Blanc de Bovelle, Blanc de Champagne, Blanc de Pages, Blanc Précoce de Kientsheim, Blanc Précoce de Kientzheim, Blussard Weiß, Blussard Weißer, Blussart Weiß, Bona in Ca, Bona in Casa, Budazgoher, Buona in Casa, Burchardt's Amber Cluster, Busby's Golden Hamburgh, Caramélo, Champion Doré, Charnu, Cibeba Bila, Early Green Maderia, Early Kienzheim, Early Leipzig, Early White Malvasia, Eichelttraube, Fresa di Mensa, Früher Grosser Gelber Malvasier, Früher Grosser Malvasier, Früher Leipziger, Früher Orleans, Frühleipziger, Frühweiße Zibebe, Früweißer, Gelbe Seidentraube, Giugnettina, Godvabne Zhelte, Golden Hamburg, Gostana, Gros Blanc, Grove and Sweetwater, Grove End Sweetwater, Grübe Seidentraube, Gustana, Gustina, Hedvabne Zlute, Joannen Charnu, Joannenc, Jouanen, Jouanenc, Jouannen, Jouannen Charnu, Jouannenc, Jouannenc Charnus, Jouannene, Juanen, Juliatique, Julliatique Blanc, Julliatique Blanche, Karmelitanka, Karmelitanka Bibela, Kientsheim, Kilianer, Krim Ai Izium, Krim Aj Izyum, Krim Ai Izyum, Krim Yai Izium, Krymskii Rannii Vinograd, Leipziger, Lignan, Lignan Blanc, Lignenga, Lilanica, Limian, Linian, Linian Belii, Linyan, Linyan Belyi, Lipsia Précoce, Lugiana Bianca, Lugiodega, Lugliana, Lugliata, ugliatica, Lugliatica Bianca, Luglienca, Luglienco Bianco, Luglienga, Luglienga Bianka, Luglienga Blanca, Lugliesa Toscana Bianca, Lugliese, Lugliese Bianca, Lugliolina, Lugliota, Luigese, Lulienga, Madaleine Blanche, Madalenen, Maddalena Bianca, Madeleine Alb, Madeleine Blanche, Madeleine Verte de la Dorée, Madlen Belii, Madlen Belii Rannii, Madlen Belyj Rannij, Margit Fegher, Margit Feher, Margit Korai Feher, Menga, Meslier, Morillon Blanc, Précoce de Hongrie, Précoce de Vaucluse, Pulsar Belyi, Ragnusaner Weiß, Raisin de la Saint Jean, Raisin de Vilmorin, Ranka, Retica, Rognaneau, Rumamellas, Rumena Svilvka, S. Anna, S. Giacomo, Saint John's, San Jacopo, Sant' Anna, Santa Anna di Lipsia, Seidentraube, Seidentraube Belga, Seidentraube Gelb, Selkovaia Kist, Shelkovaya Kist, Silltraube, Sokol, St. Anna di Lipsia, St. John's, Svivlanka, Uglienga, Uva Buona in Casa, Uva di Saint' Anna, Uva di Santanna, Uva Pastora, Uvenga, Vert Précoce de Madère, Vigriega, Vigne de Mantoue, Wälsch Gelb, Weiße Zibebe, Weißer Kilianer, Witte Leipziger, Zibibe Weiße |
| Carão de Moça (See Folgasão) | | | | | | |
| Carnal (See Diagalves) | | | | | | |
| Carrasquenho (See Sarigo) | | | | | | |
| Carrega Branco | 51816 | 2124 | B | Unknown | Douro PDO, Península de Setúbal PGI, Trás-os-Montes - Planalto Mirandês PDO | Barranquesa, Blanca de Monterrei, Branca de Monterrei, Carrega, Carrega Somera, Chavacana, Colgadeira, Malvasia Polta, Poilta |
| Carvalhal (See Azal) | | | | | | |
| Cascal | 51517 | 9064 | B | Unknown | Unknown< (Note: WPL says this variety is grown in the Vinho Verde region but cites a source saying that no stocks were reported in 2016.) | Morrão, Murrão, Pé de Perdiz, Pé de Perdrix, Pied de Perdrix, Terrantês, Terrantez |
| Cascal Blanc (See Terrantez) | | | | | | |
| Castália | 40702 | 2153 | B | Muscat of Alexandria x Montúa = Diagalves | Unknown | |
| Castelão Branco | 52615 | 2321 | B | Hebén = Mourisco Branco x Alfrocheiro Preto | Península de Setúbal PGI | Castellão Branco |
| Castelo Branco | 50309 | 23974 | B | Fernão Pires x Montúa = Diagalves | | |
| Cayetana Blanca (See Sarigo) | | | | | | |
| Cerceal (See Sercial) | | | | | | |
| Cerceal Branco | 52410 | 2389 | B | Arinto x ? | Bairrada PDO, Beira Atlântico PGI, DoTejo PDO, Douro PDO, Lisboa - Alta-Estremadura PGI, Lisboa - Encostas d'Aire PDO, Lisboa-Estremadura PGI, Lisboa PGI, Península de Setúbal PGI, Porto PDO, Tejo PGI, Terras do Dão PGI | Cerceal, Cerceal du Douro, Cerceo, Cercial, Cercial do Douru, Cercial du Dão |
| Cercial | 52412 | 16437 | B | Sercial x Malvasia Fina | Unknown (Note: WPL cites a report saying that no planting were reported in 2016.) | Cerceal Branco, Cerceal na Bairrada, Cercial da Barraida |
| Chapeludo (See Arinto) | | | | | | |
| Chardonnay Blanc | | 2455 | B | Gouais Blanc = Heunisch Weiß = Branco Valente x Pinot Noir | Alentejo PDO, Bairrada PDO, Beira Atlântico PGI, DoTejo PDO, Duriense PGI, Lisboa PGI, Lisboa - Alenquer PDO, Lisboa - Alta-Estremadura PGI, Lisboa - Arruda PDO, Lisboa - Encostas d'Aire PDO, Lisboa-Estremadura PGI, Lisboa - Óbidos PDO, Lisboa - Torres Vedras PDO, Madeirense PDO, Minho PGI, Palmela PDO, Península de Setúbal PGI, Tejo PGI, Terras do Dão PGI, Transmontano PGI | Aligote, Arboisier, Arnaison, Arnaison Blanc, Arnoison, Aubain, Aubaine, Auvergnat Blanc, Auvernas, Auvernas Blanc, Auvernat, Auvernat Blanc, Auxeras, Auxerras Blanc, Auxerrois Blanc, Auxois, Auxois Blanc, Bargeois Blanc, Bearnois, Beaunois, Biela Klevanjika, Blanc de Bonne Nature, Blanc de Champagne, Blanc de Cramant, Blanc de Breisgauer Süßling, Blanca del Pais, Bon Blanc, Breisgauer, Breisgauer Süßling, Breisgauer Sußling, Burgunder Weißer, Burgundi Feher, Chablis, Chardenai, Chardenay, Chardenet, Chardennet, Chardennet de Chablis, Chardennay de Pouilly, Chardonais, Chardonay, Chardonet, Chardoney, Chardonet, Chardonnay, Chardonnay Bjieli, Chardonnet, Chatenait, Chatey P, etit, Chatte, Chaudenay, Chaudenet, Chaudent, Clävner, Clevner, Clevner Weiß, Cravner, Dannerie, Danserrie d'Arnaison, d'Arnoison, d'Auvernat Blanc, d'Epinette, Epinette, Epinette Blanc, Epinette Blanche, Epinette de Champagne, Ericey, Ericey Blanc, Fehér Chardonnay, Fehérburgundi, Feinburgunder, Fin Plant Dore, Gamay Blanc, Gelber Schimber, Gelber Schimper, Gelber Weissburgunder, Gentil Blanc, Greco, Gros Blanc, Grosse Bourgogne, Gruendel, Klawner, Kleinedel, Kleiner Heinsch, Klevanjka Biela, Klevner, Klingelberger Grosser, Lisant, Luisant, Luiza, Luizannais, Luizant, Luzannois, Maconnais, Maurillon Blanc, Melier, Melon, Melon Blanc, Melon d'Arbois, Melon du Jura, Melona Queue Rouge, Meroué, Meunier Blanc, Moreau Blanc, Moreote Blanche, Morillon Blanc, Moulan, Moulon, Muscadet, Noiren Blanc, Noirien Blanc, Noirien Blanc Chardonnay, Obaideh, Petit Chantey, Petite Sainte Marie, Petite Sainte-Marie, Petit Sainte-Marie, Pineau Blanc, Pineau Blanc Chardonnay, Pino Plan Shardone, Pino Sardone, Pino Shardone, Pinot Bianco Chardonnay, Pinot Blanc Chardonnay, Pinot Chardonnay, Pinot Blanc à Cramant, Pinot Blanc Chardonnay, Pinot Chardonnay, Pinot de Bourgogne, Pinot Giallo, Pinot Planc, Plant de Breze, Plant de Tonnerre, Plant Doré, Plant Doré Blanc, Plant Doré de Champagne, Rolänner, Romere, Romeret, Rouci Bile, Rousseau, Roussette, Roussot, Ruländer, Ruländer Weiß, Rullenner, Sainte-Marie-Petite, Sardone, Shardone, Shardonne, Später Weiß Burgunder, Suessling, Trappling, Veis Edler, Veiser Klevner, Vitis Aurelianensis Acinic Crni, Wais Edler, Weiß Arbs, Weiß Burgunder (Normally refers to Pinot Blanc), Weiß Clevner, Weiß Cloevner, Weiß Edler, Weiß Elder, Weiß Klewner, Weiß Silber, Weißedler, Weißarbst, Weißarbst Rolander, Weißeklävler, Weißer Burgunder, Weißer Clävner, Weißer Clevner, Weißer Klävner, Weißer Rohlander, Weißer Rolander, Weißer Ruhländer, Weißer Rulander, Weißgelber Clävner, Weißgelber Klevner, Weißklävner, Weißklevner |
| Chasselas (See Chasselas Blanc) | | | | | | |
| Chasselas Blanc | | 51317 | B | Unknown | Alentejo PDO, Douro PDO, Península de Setúbal PGI | Abelione, Abelone, Albilloidea, Alsacia blanca, Amber Chasselas, Amber Muscadine, Aube, Bar sur Aube, Bassiraube, Bela Glera, Bela Žlahtnina, Berezka Prostaya, Berioska Casla, Beyaz Gutedel, Biela Plemenika Praskava, Biela Plemincka Chrapka, Biela Plemincka Pruskawa, Blanchette, Blanquette, Bois Rouge, Bon Blanc, Bordo, Bournet, Bournot, Ceasla, Charapka, Chasselas Angevin, Chasselas Bianco, Chasselas Blanc, Chasselas Blanchette, Chasselas Blanc Royal, Chasselas Crognant, Chasselas Croquant, Chasselas de Barde Montauban, Chasselas de Bar-sur-Aube, Chasselas de Bordeaux, Chasselas de Florence, Chasselas de Fontainebleau, Chasselas de Jalabert, Chasselas de la Contrie, Chasselas de la Naby, Chasselas de Moissac, Chasselas de Montauban, Chasselas de Mornain, Chasselas de Pondichéry, Chasselas de Pontchartrain, Chasselas de Pouilly, Chasselas de Quercy, Chasselas de Rappelo, Chasselas de Tenerife, Chasselas de Teneriffe, Chasselas de Thomeri, Chasselas de Thomery, Chaselas de Toulaud, Chasselas de Vaud, Chasselas di Fountanbleau, Chasselas di Thomery, Chasselas Dorada, Chasselas Dorato, Chasselas Doré, Chasselas Doré Hatif, Chasselas Doré Salomon, Chasselas du Doubs, Chasselas du Portugal, Chasselas du Roi, Chasselas du Serail, Chasselas du Thor, Chasselas Dugommier, Chasselas Dur, Chasselas Fendant, Chasselas Giclet, Chasselas Hatif de Tenerife, Chasselas Haute Selection, Chasselas Jalabert, Chasselas Jaune Cire, Chasselas Musqué, Chasselas Piros, Chasselas Plant Droit, Chasselas Queen Victoria, Chasselas Reine Victoria, Chasselas Salsa, Chasselas Tokay Angevine, Chasselas Vert de la Cote, Chasselas White, Chasselat, Chrupka, Chrupka Biela, Chrupka Bílá, Chrupka Červená, Chrupka Fialová, Chrupka Petržlenová, Chrupka Petrželová. Chrupka Muškátová, Chrupka Ružová, Chrupka Ušľachtilá, Common Muscadine, Danka Belaya, Dinka Belaya, Dinka blanche, Dobrorozne, Doppelte Spanische, Dorin, Dorin, Doucet, Eau Douce Blanche, Edelschoen, Edelwein, Edelweiss, Edelxeiss, Elba Toro, Elsaesser, Elsasser Weiss, Fabian, Fabiantraube, Fabianszölö, Fehér Chasselas, Fehér Fabianszölö, Fehér Gyöngyszőlő, Fehér ropogós, Fendant, Fendant Blanc, Fendant Roux, Fendant Vert, Florenci Jouana, Fondan Belyi, Franceset, Franceseta, Frauentraube, Gamet, Gelber Gutedel, Gemeiner Gutedel, Gentil blanc, Gentil vert, Golden Bordeaux, Gamet, Gelber Gutedel, Gemeiner Gutedel, Gentil blanc, Gentil vert, Chasselas, Großblättrige Spanische, Grosse Spanische, Grosser Spaniger, Gruener Gutedel, Gutedel, Gutedel Weiss, Gyöngyszőlő, Junker, Koenigs Gutedel, Kracher, Krachgutedel, Krachmost, Lacrima Christi Rose, Lardat, Lardeau, Lardot, Lausannois, Lourdet, Maisa, Markgräfler, Marzemina Bianca, Marzemina Niduca, Morlenche, Mornan blanc, Mornant Blanc, Mornen, Mornen Blanc, Most, Most Rebe, Moster, Pariser Gutedel, Perlan, Pinzutella, Plamenka Belyi, Plant de Toulard, Plant de Toulaud, Plemenka, Plemenka Bela, Plemenka Bijela, Plemenka Raba, Pleminka Biela, Praskava, Pruscava Biela, Queen Victoria, Queen Victoria White, Raisin d'Officier, Ranka, Rdeča Žlahtnina, Rebe Herrn Fuchses, Reben Herm Fuchs, Reben Herrn, Rheinrebe, Rosmarinentraube, Rosmarintraube, Rougeasse, Royal Muscadine, Sasla, Sasla Bela, Saszla, Schönedel, Shasla Belaya, Shasla Doré, Shasla Lechebnaya, Shasla Viktoria, Silberling, Silberling Plemenka Rana, Silberweiß, Silberweißling, Silberwisli, Silberwissling, Strapak, Süßling, Süßtraube, Sweetwater, Sweetwater White, Temprana Agostena, Temprana Tardía, Tempranillo de Nav, Temprano, Temprano Blanco, Terravin, Tribi Vognoble, Tribiano Tedesco, Ugne, Uslechtile Bile, Valais Blanc, Viala, Viviser, Wälsche, Wälscher, Weißer Gutedel, Weißer Krachgutedel, White Chasselas, White Muscadine, White Sweetwater, White Van der Laan, Žlahtina, Žlahtnina, Žlahtnina bijela, Zlatina, Župljanka |
| Chasselas Cioutat (See Uva Salsa) | | | | | | |
| Chasselas Sabor | | 40684 | B | Unknown | Península de Setúbal PGI | |
| Chenin Blanc | | 2527 | B | Savagnin Blanc = Traminer x ? | Beira Atlântico PGI, DoTejo PDO, Duriense PGI, Lisboa PGI, Lisboa-Estremadura PGI, Madeirense PDO, Minho PGI, Península de Setúbal PGI, Tejo PGI | Agudelo, Agudillo, Anjou, Blamancep. Blanc d'Anjou, Blanc d'Aunis, Blanc Emery, Blanco Legitimo, Bon Blanc, Canton, Capbreton Blanc, Chenen Belyi, Chenin, Chenin Bijeli, Confort, Coue Fort, Crouchinet, Cugnette, Fehér Chenin, Franc Chenin, Franche, Gamay Blanc, Gout Fort, Gros Chenin, Gros Pineau, Gros Pineau de Vouvray, Luarskoe, Mancais Blanc, Pera, Pineau Blanc, Pineau d'Anjou, Pineau de Briollay, Pineau d la Loire, Pineau de Savennieres, Pineau de Vouvray, Pineau Gros, Pineau Gros de Vouvray, Pineau Nantaid, Pineau Vert, Pinot d'Anjou, Plant de Breze, Plant de Clair de Lune, Plant de Maille, Plant de Salces, Plant de Salles, Plant du Clair de Lune, Plant Vole, Pointu de Savennieres, Que Fort, Quefort, Rajoulain, Rajoulin, Ronchalin, Rouchalin, Rouchelein, Rouchelin, Rougelin, Rousselin, Rouxalin, rouzoulenc, Senin, Steen, Stein, Tête de Crabe, Tite de Crabe, Ugne Lombarde, Vaalblaar Stein, Verdot de Montlucon, Verdurant, White Pinot |
| Côdega (See Síria) | | | | | | |
| Côdega de Larinho | 51317 | As Codega do Larinho - 2743 | B | Hebén = Mourisco Branco x Rabigato | Beira Atlântico PGI, DoTejo PDO, Douro PDO, Península de Setúbal PGI, Tejo PGI, Trás-os-Montes - Chaves PDO, Trás-os-Montes - Planalto Mirandês PDO, Trás-os-Montes - Vàlpaçôs PDO | Côdega do Larinho, Codega Larinho |
| Colombard | | 2771 | B | Gouais Blanc = Heunisch Weiß = Branco Valente x Chenin Blanc | Minho PGI, Península de Setúbal PGI | Barbero, Blanc Emery, Blanquette, Bon Blanc, Chabrier Vert, Charbrier Vert, Colombar, Colombard Bijeli, Colombeau, Donne Rousse, Donne Verte, French Colombard, Gros Donc Doux, Gros Blanc Doux, Guenille, Jacquère, Kolombar, Martin Cot, Pied Tendre, Queue Tendre, Queue Vert, Queue Tendre, Queue Verte, Semilão, West's White Prolific |
| Cornichon | 40708 | As Cornichon Blanc - 16488 | B | Unknown | | Aetonychi, Aitonychi Lefko, Alicante Preto, Angnur, Angour, Anguur Rimisi Blanc, Ariddu di Gaddu, Ariddu di Gaddu Bianco, Bec d'Oiseau, Bec d'Oiseaux, Bezzoul El Kelba, Bisutelli, Bisutello, Bisutolla, Boston de Gallo, Bottuna, Bottuna di Gattu, Buttuna di Gaddu, Cara, Cara de Vaca, Cara di Vaca, Carason de Cabrito, Cetrinola, Chadym, Chadym Barmak, Cibibo, Corazón de Cabrito, Coriandri Blanc, Corna, Cornacchia di Brioni, Cornetto, Cornicciola, Cornichidu, Cornichiola, Cornichon, Cornichon à Grappe Colosalle, Cornichon Blanc, Cornichon Blanco, Cornichon Doré, Cornichon Feher, Cornichon Serpovidinii, Cornichon White, Corniola, Corniola Bianca, Corniola Bianca Lunga, Corniola di Lipari, Corniole, Crochu, Crochu de Provence, Crouchu, Croque, Cugnier Blanc, Dattola, De Cuerno, Dedo de Doncella, Dedos de Doncella, Del Cuerno, Ditella, Dito di Dama, Doigts de Donzelle, Eicheltraube, Eicheltraube Weiß, Eicheltraube Weiße, Finger, Finger Grape, Fingergrape, Fischblastentraube, Fourchou, Frauenfinger, Galeta, Galleta, Galla di Montalto, Galleta, Galletta, Galletta Bianca, Galoppa Bianca, Gobbe Szolo Feher, Gobernador Benegas, Goerbeszoeloe Feher, Griffe d'Aigle, Halholyag Feher, Hanem Chelvarie, Hirschbollen, Horntraube, Kaden Parmak, Kadim, Kadim Barmak, Kadim El Barmak, Kadin Barmak, Kadin Parmak, Kornishon Belyi, Kornishon Cerpovidnyi, Kosu Titki, Kosw Tifki, Kümmerling Traube, Ladyfinger, Lagrima di Madonna, Lemba El Adja, Leonada Blanca, Leube El Adja, Melona, Menna di Vacca, Moc de Gall, Nab El Diemel, Nab El Djemel, Pergolese, Pinquant Paul, Pissutelle, Pisutelle, Pisutelli, Pizzelute, Pizzutedda, Pizzutella, Pizzutello Bianco, Quijal de Gos, Raisin Concombre Blanc, Raisin d'Afrique, Rilisi Blanc, Rognon de Coq, Santa Paula, Santa Paula Bianca, Santa Paula de Granada, Santa Paula de Grenade, Souba El Hadja, Speron di Gallo, Spitzwälscher Weißer, Teta de Vaca, Teta de Vaca Blanca, Teta de Vaca Weiße, Teta di Vaca, Teta di Vacca, Titta di Vacca, Tittiacca, Ughia d'Aquila, Unghia d'Aquila, Uovo di Gallo, Uva Ciolinna, Uva Corna, Uva Cornea, Uva Cornetta, Uva Cornicella, Uva Corniola, Uva Corruda, Uva de Africa, Uva de Cuerno, Uva de Vaca, Uva di Africa, Vegiga de Fez, Vegiga de Pez, Vessie de Poisson, Vitis Longissima, Vogelschnabel, Weißer Spitzwelscher, White Cucumber Grape, Zelodowna Bela, Zirnjaca Bela, Zirnjaca Biela |
| Corval | | 17667 | B | Unknown | Península de Setúbal PGI | |
| Crato Branco (see Síria) | | | | | | |
| Crato Espanhol (See Síria) | | | | | | |
| Dedo de Dama | | | B | Dika II x ? | Almenhaca, Alminhaca, Bougseb, Bouqseb, Bouqsob, Fedit 51-C, Ferral Branco, Lambrusque A, Teta de Cabra | |
| Diagalves (Note: The actual identity of Diagalves is confused by contradictory notes from different sources. VIVC does not list a white variety under the name Diagalves, but the option arises under the name Montúa where Diagalves is listed as a synonym. They this variety originated in Spain. WPL lists Diagalves which the say originated in Portugal and list a number of synonyms identical to VIVC's list for Montúa, and including Montúa itself which they say is the "second main name." Because of confusion arising from the sharing of synonyms with other varieties, WPL goes on to warn that Diagalves "should not be confused with either Beba (Eva) or Malvasia Fina (Diagalves) "despite seemingly suggestive synonyms or morphological similarities." As far as Portugal's official listing of varieties is concerned, the findings of Cunha et al. was that the Spanish variety Mantúo (only listed by VIVC as a synonym for Montúa and by WPL as a synonym for "Beba, Chelva and Diagalves) was equivalent to Montúa.) | | As Montúa - 2520 | B | A natural cross between Hebén = Mourisco Branco x Dedo de Dama | Alentejo PDO, Algarve - Tavira - Ave PDO, PDO, Douro PDO, Lisboa PGI, Lisboa - Alta-Estremadura PGI, Lisboa - Encostas d'Aire PDO, Lisboa-Estremadura PGI, Minho PGI, Península de Setúbal PGI, Tavira PDO, Tejo PGI | Carnal, Chelva, Chelva de Cebreros, Chelva de Guareña, Dependura, Diagolo, Diagalves, Diego Alves, Diogalves, Diog'Alves, Eva, Fernan Fer, Forastera Blanca, Formosa, Formosa Dourada, Formosa Portalegre, Gabriela, Guareña, Mantúa, Mantúo, Mantúo de Pilas, Montúa, Montúo, Montúo de Villanueva, Monyúo Gordo, Murecana, Pendura, Pendura Amarela, Raisin de Port Royal, Raisin du Roi, Uva de Puerto Real, Uva de Rey, Uva del Rey, Uva Rey, Villanueva |
| Diagalves Faux | | | B | Hebén = Mourisco Branco x Alfrocheiro Preto | Douro PDO, | Carnal, Dependura, Diego Alves, Diogalves, Eva, Fernan Fer, Formosa (Formosa is also a variety under its own name and not to be confused with Diagalves), Formosa Dourada, Formosa Portalegre, Pendura, Pendura Amarela, Villanueva |
| Dona Branca (see Branda and Síria) | | | | | | |
| Dona Joaquina | 51609 | 17261 | B | Muscat of Alexandria x Tamarez | Península de Setúbal PGI | |
| Donzelinho Branco | 52307 | 3651 | B | Cainho da Terra x Gouveio | Douro PDO, Península de Setúbal PGI, Porto PDO, Transmontano PGI, Trás-os-Montes - Planalto Mirandês PDO, Trás-os-Montes - Vàlpaçôs PDO | Donzellinho Branco, Rabigato, Terranetz, Terrantes |
| Dorinto (Note: WPL points out that this variety's former name "Arinto do Douro or Arinto no Douro was changed to Dorinto (combination of Douro and Arinto) to avoid confusion.") | 51411 | 23982 | B | Unknown | Duriense PGI, Península de Setúbal PGI, Transmontano PGI | Arinto, Arinto Branco, Arinto Cachudo, Arinto de Trás-os-Montes, Arinto do Douro, Arinto do Interior, Arinto no Douro |
| Douradinha | 51610 | 8864 | B | Amaral x Alfrocheiro Preto | | Alfrecheiro, Alfrocheiro, Alfrocheiro Branco, Branquinha, Engana Rapazes, Esgana Rapazes, Espadeiro Branco, Fernão Pires de Becco, Fernão Pires de Beco, Malvasia Fina, Padeiro Branco, Talia, Trebiano, Ugni Blanc |
| Douradinho or Douradinha dos Vinhos Verdes (See Trebbiano Toscano) | | | | | | |
| Encruzado | 52207 | 3909 | B | Unknown | Alentejo PDO, Beira Atlântico PGI, DoTejo PDO, Duriense PGI, Lisboa PGI, Lisboa - Alta-Estremadura PGI, Lisboa-Estremadura PGI, Península de Setúbal PGI, Tejo PGI, Terras do Dão PGI | Salgueirinho |
| Esgana Cão (Note: VIVC has two listings, Esgana Cão and Esgana Cão dos Vinhos Verdes, either of which could be relevant to a report on new genotypes identified in the Vinhos Verdes region. The report itself lists the variety as Esgana Cão (p. 55) and its relevance might depend on whether there are two distinct varieties or whether Esgana Cão dos Vinhos Verdes is an unrecognised synonym for Esgana Cão.) | | 25084 | B | Unknown | Rare (Note: A variety listed as Esgana Cão was discovered in the former parish of Oleiros (the report lists this as "Gagos de Cima") in the municipality of Ponte da Barca in the Vinhos Verdes region. (p.55). It is unclear whether this refers to this variety or to Esgana Cão dos Vinhos Verdes.) | |
| Esgana Cão dos Vinhos Verdes (Note: VIVC has two listings, Esgana Cão and Esgana Cão dos Vinhos Verdes, either of which could be relevant to a report on new genotypes identified in the Vinhos Verdes region. The report itself lists the variety as Esgana Cão (p. 55) and its relevance might depend on whether there are two distinct varieties or whether Esgana Cão dos Vinhos Verdes is an unrecognised synonym for Esgana Cão.) | | 40724 | B | Unknown | Rare (Note: A variety listed as Esgana Cão was discovered in the former parish of Oleiros (the report lists this as "Gagos de Cima") in the municipality of Ponte da Barca in the Vinhos Verdes region. (p. 55) It is unclear whether this refers to this variety or Esgana Cão.) | |
| Esgana Cão Furnicoso (See Esganoso) | | | | | | |
| Esgana Rapozes (See Trebbiano Toscano) | | | | | | |
| Esganinho (Note: VIVC lists Esganinho as a variety in its own right, whereas WPL says it is a synonym for Sercial.) | 41103 | 17679 | B | Unknown | Minho PGI, Península de Setúbal PGI | |
| Esganoso (Note: VIVC lists Esganoso as a variety in its own right whereas WPL lists it only as a synonym for Esganoso de Ponte de Lima and Sercial.) (See also Esganoso de Ponte de Lima and Sercial) | 50915 | 17680 | B | Unknown | Minho PGI, Península de Setúbal PGI | Esganosa de Ponte de Lima, Esganose de Lima, Esganoso de Ponte, Esganoso de Ponte de Lima, Esganoso de Ptede Lima |
| Esganoso de Ponte de Lima (Note: VIVC lists Esganoso de Ponte de Lima as a synonym for Esganoso, whereas WPL lists it as a variety in its own right.) (See also Esganoso) | | | B | Unknown | Unknown | Esganosa de Ponte de Lima, Esganoso, Esganoso de Lima, Esganoso de Ponte |
| Espadeiro Branco (See Trebbiano Toscano) | | | | | | |
| Especial Branco (See Branco Especial) | | | | | | |
| Estreito (See Estreito Macio) | | | | | | |
| Farinheira (See Malvasia Parda) | | | | | | |
| Estreito Macio | 51017 | 3983 | B | Unknown | Douro PDO, Península de Setúbal PGI | Estreito, Rabigato |
| Farinheira (See Malvasia Parda) | | | | | | |
| Fernão Pires | 52810 | 4100 | B | Malvasia Fina x ? | Açores - Graciosa PDO, Alentejo PDO, Bairrada PDO, Beira Atlântico PGI, DoTejo PDO, Douro PDO, Lisboa PGI, Lisboa - Alenquer PDO, Lisboa - Alta-Estremadura PGI, Lisboa - Arruda PDO, Lisboa - Encostas d'Aire PDO, Lisboa-Estremadura PGI, Lisboa - Torres Vedras PDO, Minho PGI, Palmela PDO, Setúbal PDO, Tejo PGI, Terras do Dão PGI, Transmontano PGI, Trás-os-Montes - Chaves PDO, Trás-os-Montes - Planalto Mirandês PDO, Trás-os-Montes - Vàlpaçôs PDO | Camarate, Fernam Pires, Fernan Piriz, Fernão Pirão, Fernao Pires, Fernão Pires do Beco, Gaeiro, Gaieiro, Maria Gomes (Second main name), Molinha, Molinha Macia, Molinho, Torrontes |
| Fernão Pires do Galego (See Bical) | | | | | | |
| Folgasão | | 4178 | B | Savagnin Blanc = Traminer x ? | Beira Atlântico PGI, Douro PDO, Madeira PDO, Madeirense PDO, Minho PGI, Porto PDO, Península de Setúbal PGI, Terras do Dão PGI, Transmontano PGI | Alfrocheiro Branco, Cabugueiro, Cagarnixo, Cagarrizo, Carao de Moca, Carão de Moça, Cagarnizo, Cagarrizo, Cumbrão, Folgacção, Folgasona, Folgazão, Folgosão, Folgusão, Fulgasão, Gagarnixo, Laga, Malvasia da Trincheira, Silveiriña, Terrantez, Terrantez da Madeira, Terrantez de Madre, Uva do Laga, Uva do Lage |
| Folha de Figueira | 51514 | 14142 | B | Unknown | Beira Atlântico PGI, Península de Setúbal PGI, Terras do Dão PGI, | Alligator, Babosa, Botelheira, Bourmel, Couche, Dona Branca, Folha de Figo, Malvasia de Porto, Prieto Picudo, Prieto Picudo Blanco, Tortozón |
| Fonte Cal | 52314 | 14141 | B | Unknown | Beira Atlântico PGI, Península de Setúbal PGI, Terras do Dão PGI, | Fonte de Cal, Fonte da Cal, Fontecal, Rabigata |
| Gadelhudo (See Azal) | | | | | | |
| Galego (See Alvarinho) | | | | | | |
| Galego Dourado | 52913 | 4325 | B | Unknown | DoTejo PDO, Lisboa PGI, Lisboa - Carcavelos PDO, Lisboa-Estremadura PGI, Península de Setúbal PGI, Tejo PGI (Note: According to VIVC, the planting of Galego Dourado in Portugal has declined from 10 ha in 2007 to 6 ha in 2010. Robinson et al. say it still manages to thrive on the east coast but link its decline in the Lisboa region to "severe urban encroachment on its vineyards.”) | Assario, Dourada, False Pedro, Galego, Gallego, Moscato Galego Dourado, Olho de Lebre, Pedro Luis, Rutherglen Pedro, False Pedro |
| Galeguinho (See Alvarinho) | | | | | | |
| Generosa (See also Moscatel Galego Branco) | 40808 | 15810 | B | Fernão Pires x Sultana Moscata | Unknown | |
| Gigante Branco (See Branco Valente) | | | | | | |
| Godelho or Godello (See Gouveio) | | | | | | |
| Gouais Blanc (See Branco Valente) | | | | | | |
| Gouveio (Note: VIVC lists Gouveio as a variety in its own right, whereas WPL says it is the synonym for Godello.) | | 12953 | B | Castellana Blanca x Savagnin Blanc = Traminer | Alentejo PDO, Beira Atlântico PGI, DoTejo PDO, Douro PDO, Minho PGI, Península de Setúbal PGI, Porto PDO, Tejo PGI, Terras do Dão PGI, Transmontano PGI, Trás-os-Montes - Chaves PDO, Trás-os-Montes - Planalto Mirandês PDO, Trás-os-Montes - Vàlpaçôs PDO, | Agodello, Agodenho, Agudanho, Agudelha, Agudelho, Agudello, Agudelo, Agudenho, Berdello, Cumbrão, Godelho, Godella, Godello (The second main name), Godenho, Godilho, Gouveio Branco, Gouveio Real, Guvejo, Ojo de Gallo, Prieto Picudo Blanco, Quveyo, Trincadente, Verdeiho, Verdejo Blanco, Verdeleu, Verdelho, Verdelho Branco, Verdelho de Madeira, Verdelho do Dão, Verdelho du Dão, Verdello |
| Gouveio Estimado (Note: WPL advises, "Despite apparently indicative synonyms or morphological similarities, it should not be confused with the varieties Godello (Gouveio), Gouveio Preto or Gouveio Real.") | 50617 | 4925 | B | Unknown | Douro PDO, Península de Setúbal PGI | |
| Gouveio Real (Note: WPL advises, "Despite apparently indicative synonyms or morphological similarities, it should not be confused with the varieties Godello (Gouveio), Gouveio Estimado or Verdelho.") | 50616 | 4927 | B | Hebén = Mourisco Branco x ? | Douro PDO, Península de Setúbal PGI | Agodello, Verdelho |
| Granho | 40606 | 17247 | B | Unknown | Península de Setúbal PGI | |
| Grés (See Malvasia Rei) | | | | | | |
| Gros Vert Blanc (See Malvasia Branca) | | | | | | |
| Hebén (See Mourisco Branco) | | | | | | |
| Heunisch Weiß (See Branco Valente) | | | | | | |
| Jacquère | | 5604 | B | Gouais Blanc = Heunisch Weiß = Branco Valente x ? | Península de Setúbal PGI | Altesse de Saint-Chef, Blanc des Ecoutoux, Buisserate, Cherche, Confechien, Coufechien, Cugnete, Cugnette, Cugniette, Jacquère Blanche, Jacquèrre, Jacquière, Jaquère, Martin Côt, Martin Côt Blanc, Molette de Montmélian, Patois Rosette, Plant de Myans, Plant des Abîmes, Plant des Abymes, Plant des Abymes de Myans, Raisin des Abîmes, Redin, Robinet, Rossettin, Roussette, Roussette de Montmélian |
| Jampal | 52515 | 5662 | B | Alfrocheiro Preto x Cayetana Blanca = Sarigo | Beira Atlântico PGI, DoTejo PDO, Douro PDO, Lisboa PGI, Lisboa - Alenquer PDO, Lisboa - Alta-Estremadura PGI, Lisboa - Arruda PDO, Lisboa - Encostas d'Aire PDO, Lisboa-Estremadura PGI, Lisboa - Óbidos PDO, Lisboa - Torres Vedras PDO, Península de Setúbal PGI, Tejo PGI, Terras do Dão PGI, | Boal Rosada, Boal Rosado, Cercial, Jampaulo, Jampolo, Jampoulo, Jeampaul, Joao Paolo, Joao Paulo, Pinheira Branca, Pineiro Branco |
| Lameirinho (See Lameiro) | | | | | | |
| Lameiro | 50611 | 6706 | B | Unknown | Beira Atlântico PGI, Minho PGI Península de Setúbal PGI, Terras do Dão PGI, Transmontano PGI, | Branco da Lama, Branco Lameiro, Lameira, Lameirinho, Lucidio, Luzidia, Luzidio, Molarinha, Molarinho |
| Larião | 51113 | 6796 | B | Hebén = Mourisco Branco x Ahmeur bou Ahmeur = Ferral | Alentejo PDO, Península de Setúbal PGI | |
| Leira | | 6796 | B | Unknown | Península de Setúbal PGI | Leiria |
| Lilás or Liláz (See Alvarinho Lilás) | | | | | | |
| Listrão (See Malvasia Rei) | | | | | | |
| Loureira (See Loureiro) | | | | | | |
| Loureiro | 52213 | As Loureiro Blanco - 6912 | B | Amaral x Branco Escola | Beira Atlântico PGI, DoTejo PDO, Lisboa PGI, Lisboa - Alta-Estremadura PGI, Lisboa-Estremadura PGI, Lisboa - Óbidos PDO, Minho PGI Palmela PDO, Península de Setúbal PGI, Tejo PGI, Terras do Dão PGI, Vinho Verde PDO, Vinho Verde - Ave PDO, Vinho Verde - Cávado PDO, Vinho Verde - Lima PDO, Vinho Verde - Paiva PDO, Vinho Verde - Sousa PDO | Amarante, Arinto, Arinto Branco, Baião, Basto, Basto Redondo, Basto Redondos, Cheiro, Dorada, Dourada, Dourado, False Pedro, Loureira, Loureiro Blanco, Loureiro Branco, Marques, Marquez, Rutherglen Pedro |
| Loureiro Blanco (See Loureiro) | | | | | | |
| Luzidio | 51115 | 17688 | B | Unknown | Unknown | |
| Madeleine Royale (See Branco Especial) | | | | | | |
| Malvasia | | | | | | |
| Malvasia (Note: Relevant to this listing, WPL says Malvasia is the short name for Malvasia de Colares and points out that it unrelated to all other varieties whose names include the word Malvasia.) | 52714 | 22968 | B | Hebén = Mourisco Branco x Amaral | Unknown (Note: WPL says the variety grows "exclusively in the Colares area northwest of Lisbon" and cites a source saying 1,031 ha were reported in 2010.) | Malvasia de Colares |
| Malvasia Babosa | 40603 | 14139 | B | Unknown | Unknown (Note: Malvasia Babosa was once grown on Madeira where its nickname was "Lazy Malmsey". According to one source, it was introduced to the islands in 1515 but is no longer cultivated there.) | Babosa, Babosa de Madère |
| Malvasia Bianca (Note: VIVC lists this as a variety in its right, whereas WPL raises doubts about whether there is an independent variety of this name.) | | 7256 | B | Malvasia Aromatica di Parma x ? | DoTejo PDO, Lisboa PGI, Lisboa - Alta-Estremadura PGI, Lisboa - Colares PDO, Lisboa-Estremadura PGI, Madeirense PDO, Península de Setúbal PGI | Alicante Espagnol du Dão, Früher Weißer Malvasier, Invarella, Iuvarella, Lavarella, Lavarella Verdana, Mährer, Malvasia, Malvasia Bastarda, Malvasia de la Rioja, Malvasia Puntinata, Malvazija Bela, Masovy Hrozon, Μονεμβασία, Monemvasia, Monemvassia, Sarga Malvazia, Tobia, Uva Greca, Verdana, White Malvasia |
| Malvasia Branca | 50912 | As Gros Vert Blanc - 5082 | B | Unknown | | Abbondaza, Aubin, Augevin, Autsebi, Autsibi, Cargue Saoume, Gros Guillaume, Gros Ver, Gros Vert, Gros Vert Bijeli, Gros Vert Tardif, Guerbaz, Guerbez, Late Syrian, Malvasia, Panse de Syrie, Pedro Ximenes Faux, Plant de Michel, Raisin de Michel, Raisin de Saint-Jeannet, Rheinelbe, Saint-Jeannet, Saint-Jeannet Tardif, Servan Blanc, Trionfo dell'Espozione, Trionfo di Gerusalemme, Verdal, Verdona, Vigne de Barriere |
Malvasia Branca de São Jorge (See Malvasia de São Jorge
| Malvasia Cândida | | 25523 | B | Unknown | Madeira PDO, Madeirense PDO, Península de Setúbal PGI | Avarega, Balsamina Bianca, Biancame, Cheres, Graeco, Gray Blanc, Grec Blanc, Greca, Greca Bianca, Greco, Greco Bianco, Greco Biondello, Greco Dactellano, Greco Bianco di Bianco, Greco Bianco di Cosenza, Greco del Vescovo, Greco del Vesuvio, Greco delle Torre, Greco Bianco di Gerace, Greco di Bianco, Greco di Ciro, Greco di Cosenza, Greco di Gerace, Greco di Rogliano, Greco Maceratino, Greco Moneccio, Greco Montecchio, Grieco, Griesco, Malmasia, Malmsey, Malavagia, Malvagia, Malvasia, Malvasia Aromatica, Malvasia Cândida, Malvasia de Banyalbufar, Malvasia de la Palma, Malvasia de Lanzarote, Malvasia de Lipari, Malvasia de Sitges, Malvasía de Tenerife, Malvasia delle Lipari, Malvasia di Bosa, Malvasia di Cagliari, Malvasia di Cagliari, Malvasia di Ragusa, Malvasia di Sardegna, Malvasia di Sitjes, Malvasia Grossa, Malvasía Rosada, Malvasija Dubrovačka, Malvasija Dubrovačka Bijela, Malvasija Kandida, Malvasija Tvrda, Malvasiya Lipaiiskaya, Malvoisie de Doubrovnik Blanche, Malvoisie de Lipari, Mavoisie de Sitges, Malvoisie Doubrovnik, Manusia, Marmaxia, Montecchiese, Morbidella, Ragusano Bianco, Trebianello, Uva Cerreto, Uva Greca, Uva Malvatica |
| Malvasia Cândida Branca (See Malvasia Cândida Romana) | | | | | | |
| Malvasia Cândida Romana (See also Malvasia Romana) | | 23164 | B | Unknown | Unknown | Malvasia Romana |
| Malvasia Colares (See Malvasia) | | | | | | |
| Malvasia Corada (See Vital) | | | | | | |
| Malvasia da Trincheira (See Folgasão) | | | | | | |
| Malvasia de Colares (See Malvasia) | | | | | | |
| Malvasia de Oeiras (See Malvoeira) | | | | | | |
| Malvasia de São Jorge (See also Malvasia-Branca | 40604 | As Malvasia Branca de São Jorge - 17689 | B | Vital x Uva Cão | Madeirense PDO, Península de Setúbal PGI | Malvasia, Malvasia B de S. Jorge, Malvasia Branca de S. Jorge, Malvasia Branca de São Jorge, Malvazia |
| Malvasia de Setúbal (See (Malvia) | | | | | | |
| Malvasia del Tomar (See Ratinho) | | | | | | |
| Malvasia di Lipari (See Malvasia Cândida) | | | | | | |
| Malvasia Dubrovačka (See Malvasia Cândida) | | | | | | |
| Malvasia Fina (See also Trebbiano Toscano) | 52512 | 715 | B | Hebén = Mourisco Branco x Alfrocheiro Preto | Açores - Graciosa PDO, Alentejo PDO, Beira Atlântico PGI, DoTejo PDO, Douro PDO, Lagos PDO, Lisboa PGI, Lisboa - Encostas d'Aire PDO, Lisboa-Estremadura PGI, Madeira PDO, Madeirense PDO, Minho PGI, Palmela PDO, Porto PDO, Setúbal PDO, Tejo PGI, Terras do Dão PGI, Transmontano PGI, Trás-os-Montes - Chaves PDO, Trás-os-Montes - Planalto Mirandês PDO, Trás-os-Montes - Vàlpaçôs PDO | Arinto, Arinto Cachudo, Arinto do Dão, Arinto du Dão, Arinto Galego, Arinto Tinto, Arinto-Arinto, Assario, Assario Branco, Boal, Boal Branco, Boal Cachudo, Boal Cachudo do Ribatejo, Boal da Madeira, Boal de Graciosa, Boal de Madeira, Boal de Madere, Bual, Cachudo, Cercial de Madere, False Clairette, Galego, Gual, Lagrima Blanc, Malmsey, Malmsey Galega, Malvasia Galega, Tamarezhino, Terrantes do Pico, Terrantez do Pico, Torrontés |
| Malvasia Parda | 41304 | 7276 | B | Unknown | Península de Setúbal PGI, Transmontano PGI | Farinheira, Malvazia Parda |
| Malvasia Polta (See Carrega Branco) | | | | | | |
| Malvasia Rei (Note: VIVC, WPL and Palomino all list this variety as a synonym for Palomino. Malvasia says under the heading "Portuguese varieties", "Malvasia Rei is believed to be the Palomino grown in Spain for Sherry production which may be related to the Malvasia family. In Portugal, Malvasia Rei is grown in the Douro, Beiras and Lisboa region." Because this variety is widely called Malvasia Rei in Portugal and therefore a number of regions have listed it under this name through EU's certification system, with regard to those regions, the variety will be listed here under this name.) | 53013 | As Palomino Fino - 8888 | B | Unknown | Alentejo PDO, Beira Atlântico PGI, DoTejo PDO, Douro PDO, Lisboa PGI, Lisboa - Alenquer PDO, Lisboa - Alta-Estremadura PGI, Lisboa - Arruda PDO, Lisboa-Estremadura PGI, Lisboa - Óbidos PDO, Lisboa - Torres Vedras PDO, Minho PGI, Península de Setúbal PGI, Tejo PGI, Terras do Dão PGI, Transmontano PGI | Over 130 synonyms including Albán, Albar, Albillo de Lucena, Assario, Bianco, Blanc d'Anjou, Chasselas de Jesus, Diagalves, Fransdruif, Golden Chasselas, Guignard de Saintours 1, Jerez, Jerezana, Jerez de la Frontera, Jerez Dorado, Jerez Fina, Jerez Fino, Listan, Listán Blanco, Listán Commun, Listán de Jerez, Listão, Listrão, Madera, Manzanilla de Sanlúcar, Merseguera, Mourisco, Ojo de Liebre, Olho de Lebre, Orcaculo, Palomina Blanca, Palomina Blanche, Palomino, Palomino Basto, Palomino de Chipiona, Palomino de Jerez, Palomino del Pinchito, Palomino Fino, Palomino Fino des Xeres, Palomino Listán, Palomino Macho, Palomino Pelusón, Palominos, Palote, Paulo, Perrum, Point Noir, Temprana, Tempranilla, Tempranillo de Granada, White French, White French Fransdruif, Xeres, Xerez, Zarcillarda |
| Malvasia Romana | | 23164 | B | Unknown | Península de Setúbal PGI | |
| Malvia | | 23164 | B | Unknown | Unknown | Malvasia de Setúbal |
| Malvoeira | | 7259 | B | Fernão Pires x Montúa = Diagalves | Unknown | Malvasia de Oeiras |
| Manteúdo | 51413 | 7346 | B | Arinto x Síria | Alentejo PDO, Algarve - Tavira - Ave PDO, Lagoa PDO, Lagos PDO, Portimão PDO, Tavira PDO | Castellano, Lisátn, Listán Blanca, Listân de Huelva, Litán del Condado, Listán Huelva, Manteúdo Branco, Manteúdo do Algarve, Manthendo, Mantheúndo, Monetudo, Moreto Branco, Val Grosso, Vale Grosso |
| Mantúo (See Diagalves) | | | | | | |
| Maria Gomes (See Fernão Pires) | | | | | | |
| Marquinhas | 53312 | 17254 | B | Fernão Pires x Sultana Moscata | DoTejo PDO, Lisboa PGI, Lisboa-Estremadura PGI, Tejo PGI | Mariquinhas |
| Medock (See Rabo de Ovelha) | | | | | | |
| Meslier-Saint-François (See Moscadet) | | | | | | |
| Molinha Macia | | 40728 | B | Unknown | Unknown (Note: Pictorial evidence and its caption shows the variety growing at Herdade do Esporão, Évora, in the Alentejo region.) | |
| Montúo (See Diagalves) | | | | | | |
| Moscadet | 51417 | As Meslier-Saint-François - 7677 | B | Unknown | Douro PDO, Península de Setúbal PGI, Transmontano PGI | Anereau, Annereau, Blanc Ramé, Blanc Ramet, Blayais, Bonne Blanche, Bordeaus Blanc, Chalosse, Chalosse de Bordeaux, Co de France, François Blanc, Gros Meslier, Grosse Blanche, Hartig 373, Meslier, Meslier Blanc, Meslier d'Orleans, Meslier de Seine et Oise, Meslier du Gâtinais, Meslier du Gers, Meslier Gros, Meslier Jaune, Meslier Vert, Moscade, No 373, Pelegarie, Pelgarie, Pot de Vin, Purgarie |
| Moscatel Graúdo or Moscatel Graúdo Branco (See Muscat of Alexandria) | | | | | | |
| Moscatel Branco (See Moscatel Nunes) | | | | | | |
| Moscatel Carré (See Malvasia Rei) | | | | | | |
| Moscatel de Bago Miúdo (See Moscatel Galego Branco) | | | | | | |
| Moscatel de Setúbal (See Muscat of Alexandria) | | | | | | |
| Moscatel Galego Branco | 52915 | As Muscat à Petits Grains Blancs - 8193 | B | Unknown | DoTejo PDO, Douro PDO, Palmela PDO, Porto PDO, Setúbal PDO, Tejo PGI, Transmontano PGI, Trás-os-Montes - Chaves PDO, Trás-os-Montes - Planalto Mirandês PDO, Trás-os-Montes - Vàlpaçôs PDO | Ag Muskat, Alpianae de los Romanos, Anatholicon Moschaton, Apiana, Bala Dinka, Barzsing, Barzsing Bjala Tamjanka, Beala Tameanka, Bela Dinka, Beli Muscat, Beli Muskat, Belii Muscatnii, Beyaz Misket, Biblina, Bily Muscatel, Bily Muskatel, Bjala Tamjanka, Black Muscat, Blanche Douce, Bornova Misketi, Brown Muscat, Busuioaca, Busuioaca de Moldava, Busuioaca de Moldavia, Busuioaca di Moldavia, Busuiok, Chungi, Scikos Muskotaly, Csikos Muskotaly, Csikos Zoeld Szagos, Cungy, Dinka Bela, Early Silver Frontignan, Fehér Muskotaly, Franczier Veros Muscatel, Franczier Voros Muscatel, Frankincense, Frontignac, Frontignan, Gelber Muscateller, Gelber Muskateller, Gelber Weirauch, Generosa, Gray Muscat, Grüner Musk, Grüner Muskateller, Hazai Muskotály, Honi Muskotály, Irmes, Istarski Muškat, Joenica, Joszagu, Katzendreckler, Kedves Muskotaly, Khungi, Kilianstraube, Kungi, Kunqi, Kustidini, Ladanniy, Ladanny, Ladannyi, Ladany, Lidannyi, Lidannyj, Malvasia Bianca, Malvasia di Viggiano, Momjanski, Moscadello, Moscadello Giallo, Moscat Bianco, Moscata Bianca, Moscatel, Moscatel Amizclerco, Moscatel Blanco, Moscatel Branco, Moscatel Branco de Grand Menudo, Moscatel Castellano, Moscatel Commun, Moscatel Comun, Moscatel de Bago Miúdo, Moscatel de Bago Miúdo Blanco, Moscatel de Bago Miúdo Branco, Moscatel de Canelli, Moscatel de Frontignan, Moscatel de Grano, Moscatel de Grano Menudo, Moscatel de Grano Menudo Blanco, Moscatel de Grano Pequeno, Moscatel de Douro, Moscatel de Jéus, Moscatel de la Tierra, Moscatel de Toro, Moscatel del Pais, Moscatel do Douro, Moscatel Dorado, Moscatel Encarnado, Moscatel Fino, Moscatel Galego, Moscatel Grano Menudo, Moscatel Menudo, Moscatel Menudo Bianco, Moscatel Menudo Blanco, Moscatel Menudo Branco, Moscatel Morisco, Moscatel Morisco Fino de Málaga, Moscatel Nunes, Moscatel Romano, Moscatelillo, Moscatella Bianca, Moscatella Generosa, Moscatella Isidori, Moscatello, Moscatello Antico, Moscatello Bianco, Moscatello di Saracena, Moscatello di Taggia, Moscatellone, Moscato, Moscato Bianco, Moscato Bianco Comune, Moscato Bianco dell'Elba, Moscato Blanco, Moscato Canelli, Moscato d'Arqua, Moscato d'Asti, Moscato dei Colli, Moscato dei Colli Euganei, Moscato di Candia, Moscato di Canelli, Moscato di Chambave, Moscato di Frontignan, Moscato di Momiano, Moscato di Montalcino, Moscato di Noto, Moscato di S. Maria, Moscato di Sardegna, Moscato di Siracusa, Moscato di Sorso-Sennori, Moscato di Tempio, Moscato di Tempio Pausania, Moscato di Trani, Moscato Forlivese, Moscato Reale, Moscato Samos, Moscatofilo, Moschato, Μοσχάτο Άσπρο (Moschato Aspro), Μοσχάτο Κερκύρας (Moschato Kerkyras), Moschato Lefko, Moschato Mazas, Moschato of Samos, Moschato of Spinas, Moschato Riou, Moschato Samou, Moschato Spinas, Moschato Trani, Moschonidi, Moschostaphylo Aspro, Moschoudi, Moschoudi Proïmo, Moscodellone, Moscovitza, Moshato Spinas, Moskat Bianco, Moskat I Bardhe, Muscadel, Muscadel Morisco, Muscat, Muscat Blanc à Petits Grains, Muscat à Petit Graine, Muscat à Petit Grains, Muscat Blanc à Petits Grains Blanc, Muscat Belli, Muscat Belyi, Muscat Blanc, Muscat Blanc Commun, Muscat Blanc de Frontignan, Muscat Blanc de Valois, Muscat Canelli, Muscat Commun, Muscat d'Alsace, Muscat d'Alsace Blanc, Muscat d'Astrakhan, Muscat de Alsace, Muscat de Chambave, Muscat de Colmar, Muscat de Die, Muscat de Frontignan, Muscat de los Angeles, Muscat de los Franceses, Muscat de Lunce, Muscat de Lunel, Muscat de Narbonne, Muscat de Narbonne, Muscat de Rivesaltes, Muscat de Samos, Muscat de Spina, Muscat di Frontignan, Muscat du Puy de Rome, Muscat du Valais, Muscat Frontignan, Muscat Frontiniansky, Muscat Frontinianskyii, Muscast Hatif du Puy de Rome, Muscat Lunel, Muscat Patras, Muscat Psilos, Muscat Quadrat, Muscat Sámos, Muscast Spitak, Muscata Bianca, Muscatel Branco, Muscatel do Douro, Muscateller, Muscateller Weiß, Muscatellus, Muscato Bianco, Muscattler, Musk Grüner, Musk Weißer, Muskacela, Muskadel White, Muskat, Muskat Beli, Muskat Belii, Muskat Belij, Muskat Belyi, Muskat Belyj, Muskat Bijeli, Muskat Frontinjan, Muskat Frontinyanskii, Muskat Frontnyanskyii, Muskat Iyunel, Muskat Ljunel, Muskat Lyunel, Muskat Monjanski, Muskat Morujanski, Muskat Peti Gran, Muskat Rannii, Muskat Rumeni, Muskat Traube Weiße, Muškát Istarski, Muškát Momjanski, Muškát Žltý, Muškát Žlutý, Muškát Muskuti, Muškát Žuti, Muskatály, Muskatel, Muskateller, Muskateller Gelb, Muskateller Gelber, Muskateller Grün, Muskateller Grüner, Muskateller Weißer, Muskateller Weißgelber, Muskatentraube Weißer, Muskota, Muskotály, Muskuti, Mysket, Myskett, Piros Muskotály, Ranfler, Red Muscat, Rozsdas Muskotály, Rumeni Mušikát, Rumeni Muškát, Saint-Jacques-Blanc, Sárga Muskatàly, Sárga Muskotály, Sari Muscateller, Schmeckende, Schmeckende Weyrer, Schmeeckender, Schmekender, Seidentraube, Szagos Weirer, Tamâioasa, Tamâioasa Alba, Tamâioasa Alba de Drăgășani, Tamâioasa Alba Romaneasca, Tamâioasa de Drăgășani, Tamâioasa de Moldava, Tamâioasa di Moldavia, Tamâioasa Romaneasca, Tamâioaza, Tamayaza, Tamianka, Tamiiata, Tamâiioasa, Tamâiioasa Alba de Bohotin, Tamâiioasa Alba Romineasca, Tamiioasa de Bohotin, Tamiioasa de Drăgășani, Tamiioasa de Moldava, Tamiioasa de Muntenia, Tamiioasa Romineasca, Tamiiosa Alba, Tamiiosa de Drăgășani, Tamiiosa de Moldava, Tamjanika Bela, Tamjanika Bijela, Tamjanka, Tamnjanika Bela, Tamyanika, Tamyanka, Temjanika, Uva Apiana, Uva de Chiero, Uva Moscatello, Wanzenweinbeer, Weier, Weier Muskatály, Weihrauch, Weihrauch Gelg, Weihrauch Weiß, Weihrauchtraube, Weiße Muskattraube, Weißer Grüner, Weißer Muskateller, Weißgelber, Weißgelber Muskateller, Weyrauch Weißer, Weyrer, White Frontignac, White Frontignan, White Muscadel, White Muscat, Weirer, Yellow Muscat, Zoruna, Žuti Muskat, Žtimuscat |
| Moscatel Graúdo (See Muscat of Alexandria) | | | | | | |
| Moscatel Nunes | 53015 | 15680 | B | Hebén = Mourisco Branco x Muscat of Alexandria | Península de Setúbal PGI | Moscatel Branco |
| Mourisco (See Trajadura) | | | | | | |
| Mourisco Branco | 50916 | As Hebén - 5335 | B | Unknown | Douro PDO | Alzibib, Aparia, Augibi, Auzeby, Ben, Calabrese di Oliena, Edenes, Even de Yepes, Fragilis, Gibi, Hebén, Jeven, Jubi Blanc, Laco Blanco, Lard de Pouerc, Lekel Aneb, Lekhal Aneb, Maccabeu à Gros Grains, Monica Bianca, Monica Bianca di Sini, Mora Bianca, Mourisco Branco, Pansale, Panse Blanche, Pansera, Pansero, Panzale, Passerille Blanche, Tercia Blanc, Torrontés |
| Müller-Thurgau | | 24446 | B | Riesling x Madeleine Royale = Branco Especial | Duriense PGI, Minho PGI, | Miler Turgau, Mueller, Mueller Thurgau, Mueller Thurgeau White, Müller, Müllerka, Müllerovo, Müller Thurgau Bijeli, Müller Thurgau Blanc, Müller Thurgau Rebe, Müller Thurgau Weißer, Müller-Thurgaurebe, Muller, Muller-Thurgau, Muller-Thurgeau, Mullerka, Mullerovo, Riesling-Silvaner, Riesling-Sylvaner, Riesling x Silvaner, Reisling x Sylvaner, Reisvaner, Rivaner, Rizanec, Rizlingsilvani, Rizlingszilvani, Rizlingzilvani, Rizvanac, Rizvanac Bijeli, Rizvanec, Rizvaner, Uva di Lauria |
| Muscat à Petits Grains Blanc (See Moscatel Galego Branco) | | | | | | |
| Muscat of Alexandria or Muscat d'Alexandrie | | 8241 | B | Heptakilo x Muscat à Petits Grains Blanc | Alentejo PDO, Algarve - Tavira - Ave PDO, DoTejo PDO, Duriense PGI, Lagoa PDO, Lagos PDO, Lisboa PGI, Lisboa - Alta-Estremadura PGI, Lisboa-Estremadura PGI, Lisboa - Óbidos PDO, Palmela PDO, Península de Setúbal PGI, Portimão PDO, Setúbal PDO, Tavira PDO, Tejo PGI | More than 300 synonyms from around the world including Acherfield's Early Muscat, Albillo di Toro, Alexandriai Muskotály, Aleksandrijski Muscat, Angliko, Apostoliatiko, Argelino, Augibi Blanc, Cibeben Muscateller, Cibib, Cibib Muscatan Bijeli, Daroczy Musko, Gerosolimitana Bianca, Gordia, Gordo, Gordo Zibibo, Gorosolimitana Bianca, Hanepoot, Isidori, Iskendiriye Misketi, Jubi Blanc, Lexia, Malaga, Meski, Moscatel Bianco, Moscatel Blanco, Moscatel d'Alessandria, Moscatel de Alejandría, Moscatel de Chipiona, Moscatel de Grano Gordo, Moscatel de Jesus, Moscatel de Malaga, Moscatel de Málaga, Moscatel de Setúbal, Moscatel Flamenca, Moscatel Gordo, Moscatel Gordo Blanco, Moscatel Gordo Morado, Moscatel Graúdo, Moscatel Graúdo Branco, Moscatel Romano, Moscatellone, Moscato di Pantelleria, Moscato Francese, Moscato Gordo, Moschato Alexandrias, Moschato Limnou, Muscat à Gros Grains, Muscat Boxwood, Muscat d'Alexandrie Blanc, Muscat de Berkain, Muscat de Fandouk, Muscat de Jerusalem, Muscat de Raf-Raf, Muscat de Rome, Muscat d'Espagne, Muscat El Adda, Muscat Gordo Blanco, Muscat Grec, Muscat of Alexandria, Muscat Romain, Paradisia, Roode Hanepoot, Salamanca, Seralamanna, Tamîioasa de Alexandria, Uva di Pantelleria, Weißer Spanier, Weißer Zibeben-Muscateller, White Muscat of Alexandria, White Hanepoot, Zibeben Muskateller, Zibibo, Zibibo Blanco |
| Muscat Blanc (See Moscatel Galego Branco) | | | | | | |
| Muscatel Galego (See Moscatel Galego Branco) | | | | | | |
| Naia | 40703 | 8333 | B | Ferral Roxo x Castelão | Unknown | |
| Nehelescol | 40501 | 8467 | B | Unknown | Península de Setúbal PGI | Eparce, Eparse, Eparse Blanche, Eparse Menué, Esparse, Geant de la Palestine, Geant de Palestine, Gelobten Landestraube, Heilinglandtraube, Jerusalem, Jupp's Rosenkranztraube, Kanaani, Maraviglia, Negelescol, Neguelescol, Neheleschol, Olivette à Petits Grains, Olivette Jaune à Petit Grain, Olivette Jaune à Petits Grains, Palestina, Palestina Bianca, Palestine, Promicão, Promissão, Promissão Branca, Raisin Blanc de Jerusalem, Raisin de Jericho, Raisin de la Palestine, Raisin de la Terre Promise, Raisin de Palestine, Raisin de Poche Blanc, Struguri de Jerusalem, Syrian, Terra Promessa, Terra Promessa Bianca, Terre Promise, Uva de Promissão, Uva della Terra Promessa, Uva di Gerusalemme, Uva di Palestina |
| Olho de Lebre (See Malvasia Rei) | | | | | | |
| Padernã (See Arinto) | | | | | | |
| Palomino Fino (See Malvasia Rei) | | | | | | |
| Pé Comprido | 41002 | As Bourboulenc - 1612 | B | Gouais Blanc = Heunisch Weiß = Branco Valente x ? | Douro PDO, Península de Setúbal PGI | Asprokondoura, Berlou Blanc, Blanquette, Blanquette du Frontonnais, Blanquette du Gard, Blanquette Menue, Bourboulenc, Bourboulenco, Bourboulene, Bourbouleng, Bourboulenque, Bourbounenco, Burbulen, Clairette à Grains Ronds, Clairette Blanche, Clairette Dorée, Clairette Grosse, Clairette Rousse, Clairette Rousse du Var, Claretta, Doucillon, Doucillon Blanc, Frappad, Grosse Clairette, Lou Piouran, Malvoisie, Mouretille, Ondenc, Picardin, Roussaou, Roussette, Roussette du Vaucluse |
| Pé de Periz Branco (See Arinto) | | | | | | |
| Pedernã (See Arinto) | | | | | | |
| Pedro (See Bical) | | | | | | |
| Pedro Ximenez Canario (See Samarrinho) | | | | | | |
| Pêra de Bode (See Trebbiano Toscano) | | | | | | |
| Perigo | | 17708 | B | Unknown | Península de Setúbal PGI | Peringo |
| Pérola (See Boal de Alicante Moscatel and Malvasia Rei) | | | | | | |
| Perrum (Note: VIVC lists this as a variety in its right, whereas WPL raises doubts about whether there is an independent variety of this name, whereas WPL says it is a synonym for Malvasia Rei and Pedro Ximénez.) (See also Malvasia Rei) | 51617 | 9183 | B | Hebén = Mourisco Branco x ? | Alentejo PDO, Lagoa PDO, Lagos PDO, Portimão PDO | Perrmo, Perrum Branco, Perruna, Perruno |
| Pinheira (See Azal) | | | | | | |
| Pinheira Branca (See Branda and Jampal) | | | | | | |
| Pinot Blanc | | 9272 | B | A point genetic mutation of Pinot Noir | Bairrada PDO, Beira Atlântico PGI, DoTejo PDO, Duriense PGI, Lisboa PGI, Lisboa-Estremadura PGI, Minho PGI, Palmela PDO, Península de Setúbal PGI, Tejo PGI, Terras do Dão PGI, Transmontano PGI | Ag Pino, Arbst Weiß, Arnaison Blanc, Arnoison, Auvernas, Auvernat, Auvernat Blanc, Auxerrois, Beli Pinot, Beyaz Burgunder, Biela Klevanjka, Bijeli Pino, Blanc de Champagne, Bon Blanc, Borgogna Bianca, Borgogna Bianco, Borgognino, Borgona Blanco, Borgonja Dela Mala, Borgonja Malo Zrno, Burgunda, Burgundac, Burgundac Beli, Burgundac Bijeli, Burgunder Blanc, Burgunder Weiß, Burgunder Weißer, Burgundi Fehér, Burgundi Kisfehér, Burgundische Ximenstraube, Burgundske Bieli, Burgundske Bile, Chardonnet Pinot Blanc, Clävner, Clevner, Epinette, Epinette Blanche, Fehér Burgundi, Fehér Kisburgundi, Fehér Klevner, Fehérburgundi. Fin Plant Doré, Gentil Blanc, Grossburgunder, Kisburgundi Fehér, Klävner, Klävner Weißer, Kleinedel, Kleinedel Weißer, Kleiner Weiß, Klevanjka Bijela, Klevner, Klevner Weiß, Moretoe Varieté Blanche, Morillon Blanc, Noirien Blanc, Pineau, Pineau Blanc, Pineau Blanc Vrai, Pino Belii, Pino Belyi, Pino Blan, Pino na Vino, Pinot Bianco, Pinot Bianco Verde, Pinot Bijeli, Pinot Blanc Chardonnet, Pinot Blanc d'Alsace, Pinot Blanc Vrai, Pinot Branco, Pinot Doux, Pinot Verde, Plant de la Dole, Plant Doré, Rehfall, Roci Bile, Rouci Bile, Ruländer Weiß, Rulandske Biele, Rulandske Bile, Rulandsky Bile, Spätburger Doré, Später Weißer Burgunder, Vejser Burgunder, Vert Plant, Weiß Elder, Weißarbst, Weißburdunder, Weißcläven, Weißclevener, Weißer Arbst, Weißer Klävner, Weißer Klevner, Weißgelber Klevner, Weißklävler, Weißklevner, Ximenesia Burgundica |
| Pintosa | | As Branco Escola - 9290 | B | Unknown | Minho PGI, Península de Setúbal PGI | Asal de Santo Tirso, Azal de Santo Tirso, Azal de São Tirso, Borrado das Moscas (Also a synonym for Bical), Branco de Asa, Cagado das Moscas |
| Planta Fina (See Alicante Branco) | | | | | | |
| Planta Nova | | | B | Rojal Tinta x Heptakilo | Península de Setúbal PGI | Alligator, Alva, Alvarelhão Branco, Coma, Malvasía, Tardana, Tortozon, Tortozón, Tortozôn |
| Posto Branco (See Síria) | | | | | | |
| Praça | 51715 | 9655 | B | Rabigato x Castellana Blanca | Douro PDO, Península de Setúbal PGI, | Praça Dura |
| Promissão (See Nehelescol) | | | | | | |
| Rabigato (See also Estreito Macio and Rabo de Ovelha) | 52014 | 9857 | B | Unknown | Douro PDO, Península de Setúbal PGI, Porto PDO, Transmontano PGI, Trás-os-Montes - Chaves PDO, Trás-os-Montes - Planalto Mirandês PDO, Trás-os-Montes - Vàlpaçôs PDO, | Alva, Baldoeira, Baldsena, Boal, Camarate, Carrega Besta, Donzellindo Branco, Donzellinho Branco, Estreito, Estreito Macio, Estuito, Medoc, Moscatel Bravo, Muscatel Brava, Muscatel Bravo, Não Há, Nozedo, Pastora, Puesta en Cruz, Rabigato du Douro, Rabigato Respigueiro, Rabigato Respinguiero, Rabisgatos, Ribagatos, Rodrigo Affonso, Rodrigo Alfonso, Roupeiro |
| Rabigato Moreno | 50917 | 9859 | B | Hebén = Mourisco Branco x Rabigato | Douro PDO, Península de Setúbal PGI | |
| Rabisgato (See Rabo de Ovelha) | | | | | | |
| Rabo de Carneiro (See Rabigato) | | | | | | |
| Rabo de Gato (See Rabo de Ovelha) | | | | | | |
| Rabo de Ovelha | 52011 | 16956 | B | Unknown | Alentejo PDO, Bairrada PDO, Beira Atlântico PGI, DoTejo PDO, Douro PDO, Lagoa PDO, Lisboa PGI, Lisboa - Alenquer PDO, Lisboa - Alta-Estremadura PGI, Lisboa - Arruda PDO, Lisboa - Bucelas PDO, Lisboa - Encostas d'Aire PDO, Lisboa-Estremadura PGI, Lisboa - Óbidos PDO, Minho PGI, Lisboa - Torres Vedras PDO, Palmela PDO, Portimão PDO, PDO Setúbal, Setúbal PDO, Tejo PGI, Terras do Dão PGI, | Fernan Piriz, Laemmerschwanz, Medic, Medock, Rabigato, Rabigato dos Vinhos Verdes, Rabo de Gato, Rabo de Ovelha Branco, Rabo de Ovelha de Colares, Rabo de Ovella, Rabo del Ovelho Branco |
| Ratinho | 52309 | 9927 | B | Malvasia Fina x Síria | DoTejo PDO, Douro PDO, Lisboa PGI, Lisboa - Alenquer PDO, Lisboa - Alta-Estremadura PGI, Lisboa - Carcavelos PDO, Lisboa - Encostas d'Aire PDO, Lisboa - Óbidos PDO, Lisboa-Estremadura PGI, Lisboa - Torres Vedras PDO, Península de Setúbal PGI, Tejo PGI, Transmontano PGI | Boal das Abelhas, Boal Ratinho, Branco Sem Nome, Carniceira, Malvasia de Tomar, Malvasia Rasteiro, Manteúdo, Mantheúdo, Saborosa, Ratinha, Uva Doce Malvasia |
| Riesling | | 10077 | B | ? x Heunisch Weiß = Branco Valente | Alentejo PDO, Beira Atlântico PGI, DoTejo PDO, Duriense PGI, Lisboa PGI, Lisboa - Alta-Estremadura PGI, Lisboa-Estremadura PGI, Lisboa - Óbidos PDO, Minho PGI, Península de Setúbal PGI, Tejo PGI, Terras do Dão PGI, Transmontano PGI | Belo Vodno, Beregi Riesling, Beyaz Riesling, Bialo Vodno, Biela Disuca Grasiva, Biela Grasevina, Biela Grasevina Bey Pecke, Bukettriesling, Dinca Grasiva Biela, Edelriesling, Edle Gewüztraube, Fehér Rajnai, Fehér Rajnai Rizling, Gelber Riesling, Gentil Aromatique, Gentile Aromatique, Gentile Aromatique Petracine, German Riesling, Gewürsriesling, Gewürztraube, Gräfenberger, Graschevina, Graschewina, Grasevina, Grasevina Rajnska, Grauer Riesling, Grobriesling, Grosser Riesling, Hochheimer, Johanisberger, Johannisberg, Johannisberger, Johannisberger Gontil Aromatique, Johannisberger Riesling, Johannisberger Weißer, Johannisberger White, Johannisberg Riesling, Karbacher, Karbache Riesling, Kastellberger, Kis Rizling, Kleigelberger, Kleiner Riesling, Kleinriesler, Kleinriesling, Klingelberger, Klingenberger, Klingerberger, Krauses, Kraußes Rößling, Lipka, Moselriesling, Nieberlander, Nieberländer, Noble Riesling, Oberkircher, Oberlander, Petit Rhin, Petit Riesling, Petracine, Pfaelzer, Pfefferl, Pfoelzer, Piros Rajnai Rizling, Plinia Rhenana, Plinia Submoschata, Pussila, Raisin du Rhin, Rajinski Riesling, Rajnai Rizlin, Rajnai Rizling, Rajnai Rizlin GM 239-20, Rajnski Rizling, Rajnski Ruzling, Rano, Rauschling Blanc, Reichsriesling, Reissler, Remo, Rendu, Reno, Renski Rizling, Reuschling, Rey Rislinqi, Reyn Rislinqi, Reyn's Risling, Reynai, Rezlik, Rezlin, Rezling, Rheingauer, Rheinriesling, Rhine Riesling, Riesler, Riesling Blanco, Riesling Blanc, Riesling Blanc sans Pepins, Riesling de Rhin, Riesling Echter Weißer, Riesling Edler, Riesling Giallo, Riesling Grau, Riesling Grosso, Riesling Grüner Mosel, Riesling im Elsass, Riesling Mosel, Riesling Reinskii, Riesling Renano, Riesling Renano Blanc, Riesling Rhénan, Riesling Rhine, Riesling Rothsieliger, Riesling Weiß, Riesling Weißer, Riesling White, Rieslinger, Rieslingtraube, Rislinenoc, Risling, Risling Reinski, Risling Rejnski, Risling Renano, Rislinoc, Risinlock, Rislinok, Rislinq, Rissling, Ritzling, Rizling Linner, Rizling Rajinski, Rizling Rajnski, Rizling Rajnai, Rizling Rajnski, Rizling Rajnski Bijeli, Rizling Rejnskij, Rizling Rýnsky, Rösling, Rössling, Rösslinger, Rüßel, Rüsseling, Рислінг (Riesling), Ryn-Riesling, Rynse Druie, Rynsky Ryzlink, Ryzlink Rýnský, Schloss Johannisberg, Starovetzke, Starovetski, Szuerke Rizling, Uva Pussila, Vitis Rhenensis, Weiser Riesler, Weiß Kleiner Riesling, Weißer Riesling, White Riesling, Yellow Riesling |
| Rio Grande | 40809 | 10102 | B | Montúa = Diagalves x Fernão Pires | Madeirense PDO, | |
| Roupeiro (See Roupeiro Branco and Síria) | | | | | | |
| Roupeiro Branco | 51314 | 17716 | B | Hebén = Mourisco Branco x Folgasão | DoTejo PDO, Palmela PDO, Península de Setúbal PGI Setúbal PDO | Roupeiro, Roupeiro de Alcobaca |
| Sabro | | 25056 | B | Hebén = Mourisco Branco x ? | Península de Setúbal PGI | Sabr |
| Sasla (See Chasselas Blanc) | | | | | | |
| Samarrinho | 40707 | 15684 | B | Savagnin Blanc = Traminer x ? | Douro PDO, Península de Setúbal PGI, Porto PDO, Trás-os-Montes - Planalto Mirandês PDO | Budelho, Pedro Ximenez Canario |
| Santoal | | 14155 | B | Unknown | Península de Setúbal PGI | Boal de Santarem |
| São Mamede | 51611 | 25524 | B | Unknown | Minho PGI, Península de Setúbal PGI | |
| Sarigo | 51316 | As Cayetana Blanca - 5648 | B | Hebén = Mourisco Branco x ? | PDO Alentejo, Douro PDO, Península de Setúbal PGI, Transmontano PGI | Albillo, Amor Blanco, Aujubi, Avesso do Minho, Baladi, Baladi Verdejo, Balai, Balay, Belledy, Blanca Cayetana, Blanco Jaén, Blanco Maizancho, Boal Carrasquenha, Boal Carrasquenho, Cagazal, Calagrano, Calagraño, Calagraño Blanc, Calagraño Blanco, Calegrano, Carrasquenha, Carrasquenho, Cayatana, Cayatana Parda, Cayetana, Cayetana Blanco, Cazagal, Charello, Charelo, Chaselo, Cheres, Cirial, Clagrano, Dedo, Dedro, Djiniani, Dona Branca, Doradillo, Farta Gosos, Garillo, Garri Blanc, Calagraño, Esclafacherri, Farta Gosos, Fartagosos, Garrida, Garrido, Garriga, Garrilla, Garrillo, Hoja Vuelta, Jaén, Jaén Blanco, Jaén Doradillo, Jaén Empinadillo, Jaén Preto, Jaén Prieto Blanco, Jaeneps, Jaenes, Jaina, Jainas, Jaines, Jarime, Jean, Jean de Castilla, Jean de Letur, Jean de Letur de Maratella, Jean Doradillo, Jean Dore, Jean Prieto, Machuenco, Maizancho, Malaguena, Malvasia, Malvoisie Espagnole, Mariouti, Marisancha, Marisanchas, Marisancho, Morisca, Morisca Blanca, Morisco, Mourisco Arsello, Mourisco Branco, Mourisco Portalegre, Naves, Naves Cazagal, Neruca, Padero, Parda, Pardilla, Pardina, Pardina Blanca, Pardinas, Pardino, Parino, Pirulet, Plateadillo, Plateado, Robal, Sarigo, Tierra de Barros, Verdeja, Virules, Xarelllo |
| Sauvignon Blanc | | 10790 | B | Savagnin Blanc = Traminer x ? | Alentejo PDO, Bairrada PDO, Beira Atlântico PGI, DoTejo PDO, Duriense PGI, Lagoa PDO, Lisboa PGI, Lisboa - Alenquer PDO, Lisboa - Alta-Estremadura PGI, Lisboa - Arruda PDO, Lisboa-Estremadura PGI, Lisboa - Óbidos PDO, Lisboa - Torres Vedras PDO, Madeirense PDO, Palmela PDO, Península de Setúbal PGI, Tejo PGI, Terras do Dão PGI, Transmontano PGI | Beyaz Sauvignon, Blanc Doux, Blanc Fumé, Blanc Fumet, Bordeaux Bianco, Douce Blanche, Fehér Sauvignon, Feigentraube, Fie, Fie dans le Neuvillois, Fumé, Fumé Blanc, Fumé Surin, Genetin, Gennetin, Gentin à Romorantin, Gros Sauvignon, Libournais, Melkii Sotern, Melkij Sotern, Muskat Silvaner, Muskat Sylvaner, Muskat Sylvaner Weißer, Muskatani Silvanec, Muskatni Silvanac, Muskatni Silvanec, Muskatsilvaner, Painechon, Pellegrina, Petit Sauvignon, Picabon, Piccabon, Pinot Mestny Bely, Pissotta, Puinechou, Punechon, Punechou, Quinechon, Rouchelin, Sampelgrina, Sarvonien, Sauternes, Sauvignon, Sauvignon à Gros Grains, Sauvignon Bianco, Sauvignon Bijeli, Sauvignon Blanc Musque, Sauvignon Blanco, Sauvignon Fumé, Sauvignon Gris, Sauvignon Gros, Sauvignon Janne, Sauvignon Jaune, Sauvignon Jeune, Sauvignon Musque, Sauvignon Petit, Sauvignon Rose, Sauvignon Rouge, Sauvignon Vert, Sauvignon White, Savagnin, Savagnin Blanc, Savagnin Musque, Savagnou, Savignon, Savvy B, Servanien, Servonien, Servoyen, Sobinion, Sobinjon, Sobinyon, Sotern Marunt, Sotern Small, Souternes, Sovignion Blan, Sovinak, Sovinjon, Sovinjon Beli, Sovinon, Sovinon Belyi, Sovinyon, Spergolina, Surin, Suvinjo, Sylvaner Musque, Uva Pelegrina, Verdo Belii, Verdo Belyi, Weißer Sauvignon, Xirda Sotern, Zeleni Sauvignon, Zöld Ortlibi |
| Seara Nova | 40403 | 10850 | B | Montúa = Diagalves x Fernão Pires | DoTejo PDO, Lisboa PGI, Lisboa - Alenquer PDO, Lisboa - Alta-Estremadura PGI, Lisboa - Arruda PDO, Lisboa - Encostas d'Aire PDO, Lisboa-Estremadura PGI, Lisboa - Óbidos PDO, Lisboa - Torres Vedras PDO, Tejo PGI | H-8-21-59 |
| Sedouro (See Batoca) | | | | | | |
| Semilão (See Sémillion and Boal Branco) | | | | | | |
| Sémillon | | 11480 | B | Unknown | Alentejo PDO, Beira Atlântico PGI, DoTejo PDO, Douro PDO, Lisboa PGI, Lisboa-Estremadura PGI, Minho PGI, Palmela PDO, Península de Setúbal PGI, Porto PDO, Tejo PGI, Terras do Dão PGI, Transmontano PGI | Barnawartha Pinot, Blanc Doux, Blanc Semillon, Boal, Boal no Douro, Cheviler, Chevrier, Chevrier Blanc, Colombar, Colombar Blanc, Colombarride, Colombier, Daune Verte, Dausne, Goulu Blanc, Greengrape, Groendruif, Gros Sémillon, Hunter River Riesling, Maisois, Malaga, Málaga Bianco, Mances Blanc, Mansois Blanc, Marcillac, Monsois Blanc, Oron Sémillon, Petit Sémillon, Petrichtraube Weiße, Saint Émilion, Saint Sémillon, Sauternes, Semijon, Semilão (A synonym often used for Boal Branco in the Dour region), Semilhão, Semilion, Semillon Bianco, Semillon Bijeli, Sémillon Blanc, Sémillon Crucillant, Semillon Fehér, Sémillon Grande, Semillon Muscat, Semillon Piccolo, Sémillon Roux, Semillon White, Semilon, Semilyon, Seminon, Sotern, St Emilion, Teisor |
| Seminário (See Malvasia Rei) | | | | | | |
| Sercial | 40505 | 11497 | B | Unknown | Alentejo PDO, Beira Atlântico PGI, DoTejo PDO, Douro PDO, Lisboa PGI, Lisboa - Alta-Estremadura PGI, Lisboa - Bucelas PDO, Lisboa-Estremadura PGI, Madeira PDO, Madeirense PDO, Minho PGI, Península de Setúbal PGI, Porto PDO, Tejo PGI, Terras do Dão PGI, Transmontano PGI | Arintho, Arinto, Arinto dos Acores, Cachorrinho, Cerceal, Cerceal de Jaes, Esaninho, Escanoso, Esgana, Esgana Cão, Esgana Dão, Esgana de Castelo de Paiva, Esganacão Bianco, Esganinho, Esganiso, Esganosa, Esganoso, Esganoso de Bicelas, Esganoso de Castelo de Paiva, Esganoso de Penafiel, Eskanoza, Espadeiro Louriero, Etrangle Chien, Madera, San Mamede, Sarcial, Serceal, Sercial de Madeira, Sercial de Madere, Sersial, Uca Cão, Verdelho Branco |
| Sercialinho | 51011 | As Sercealinho - 11496 | B | Sercial x Alvarinho | Bairrada PDO, Beira Atlântico PGI, Terras do Dão PGI | Cercealinho, Cercialinho, Sercealinho |
| Síria | 51213 | 2742 | B | Hebén = Mourisco Branco x Folgasão | Alentejo PDO, Algarve - Tavira - Ave PDO, Beira Atlântico PGI, DoTejo PDO, Douro PDO, Lagoa PDO, Lagos PDO, Lisboa PGI, Lisboa-Estremadura PGI, Portimão PDO, Porto PDO, Tavira PDO, Tejo PGI, Terras do Dão PGI, Transmontano PGI, Trás-os-Montes - Chaves PDO, Trás-os-Montes - Planalto Mirandês PDO, Trás-os-Montes - Vàlpaçôs PDO | Doña Blanca or Dona Branca, (Note: Whether Doña Blanca is a unique variety or a synonym for Síria appears to be a matter of debate. One source says,Doña Blanca is an obscure white grape variety used in the production of White Port and, less frequently, dry table wines. It finds its home on the northwestern corner of the Iberian Peninsula, particularly in the vineyards of northern Portugal and Galicia in Spain." Doña Blanca seems to be suggesting wider usage in Portugal: "Doña Blanca (Spanish "White Lady", also known as Dona Branca in Portuguese) is a white Spanish and Portuguese grape variety that is grown … throughout Portugal from the Douro northward." WPL does not treat Doña Blanca as a variety in its own right but as a synonym of Síria. In IVV's "Lista da Castas: Castas Brancas" there is no listing of Dona Branca under its own name, but it is mentioned as a Sinónimo Reconhecido (Recognised Synonym) of Folha de Figueira There is no mention of it against Síria.) Dona Branca do Dão, Dona Branca no Dão, Doninha, Erica, Faphly, Gooellone, Graciosa, Gracioso, Grumere Blanco, Jampal, Malvasía, Malvasia Branca, Malvasía Castellana, Malvasía Grossa, Malvasía Grosso, Malvazia, Malvazia Grossa, Malvoise des Chartreux, Malvoisie Grosse, Mennavacca, Mokrani, Moza Fresca, Muagur, Paloppo, Posto Branco, Roupeiro, Roupeiro Chachudo, Roupeiro de Alcobaca, Roussna, Sabra, Sabro, Santo Estêvão, Tamarez, Tamarez d'Algarve, Trebbiano de Toscana, Uva Gorda, Uva Grossa, Valenciana, Valenciana Blanca, Verdegudillo, Vermentino de Corse, Voal Cachudo |
| Tália (See Trebbiano Toscano) | | | | | | |
| Tamarez (See also Trincadeira das Pratas) | 51910 | 12231 | B | Unknown | Alentejo PDO, Algarve - Tavira - Ave PDO, Beira Atlântico PGI, DoTejo PDO, Douro PDO, Lisboa PGI, Lisboa - Alta-Estremadura PGI, Lisboa - Encostas d'Aire PDO, Lisboa-Estremadura PGI, Península de Setúbal PGI, Tavira PDO, Tejo PGI, Terras do Dão PGI, Transmontano PGI | Arinto Gordo, Folha de Figueira, Boal Prior, Camarate, Crato Branco, Dona Branca, Folha de Figueira, Malvasia, Molinha, Molinha do Vau, Mollinha, Roupeiro, Santo Estêvão, Tamares, Tamares de Ribatejo, Tamarez Branco, Tamarez d'Azeitão, Tamarez Portalegre, Trincadeiro, Trincadeiro das Pratas, Trincadeiro do Douro |
| Tamarez Moscatel | | 12234 | B | Trincadeira das Pratas x Muscat of Alexandria | | |
| Terrantes du Dão (See Terrantez) | | | | | | |
| Terrantez | 52210 | As Terrantes du Dão - 12377 | B | Unknown | Açores - Biscoitos PDO, Açores - Graciosa PDO, Açores - Pico PDO, Beira Atlântico PGI, Douro PDO, Minho PGI, Península de Setúbal PGI, Terras do Dão PGI, | Cascal, Folgasão, Morrão, Murrão, Pé de Perdiz, Pé de Perdrix, Pied de Perdix, Terrantes, Terrantes du Dão, Terrantez da Madeira, Terrantez du Dão, Torrontes Português |
| Terrantez da Terceira (See Arinto) | | | | | | |
| Terrantez do Pico | 50216 | 26140 | B | Verdelho Branco x Trousseau Noir = Bastardo | Península de Setúbal PGI, | Terrantes do Pico, Terrantez |
| Touriga Branca (Note: VIVC lists this as Branco Gouvães with Touriga Branca as a synonym.) (Note: The warning from WPL is that Touriga Branca "must not be confused with the other Touriga varieties or Planta Nova (Alvarelhão Branco), despite the fact that the synonyms and morphological similarities seem to indicate this.") (See also Branco Gouvães | | As Branco Gouvães - 17657 | B | Unknown | Douro PDO, Península de Setúbal PGI | Alvarelhão Branco, Branco de Gouvães, Branco Gouvães |
| Trajadura | 52710 | 12629 | B | Unknown | Beira Atlântico PGI, Minho PGI, Península de Setúbal PGI, Vinho Verde PDO, Vinho Verde - Amarante PDO, Vinho Verde - Ave PDO, Vinho Verde - Basto PDO, Vinho Verde - Cávado PDO, Vinho Verde - Lima PDO, Vinho Verde - Paiva PDO, Vinho Verde - Sousa PDO | Teixadura Blanca, Tragadura, Teixadura, Trinca Dente, Trincadeira, Trincadente, Verdello Rubio |
| Trebbiano Toscano | | 12628 | B | Unknown | Alentejo PDO, Beira Atlântico PGI, DoTejo PDO, Duriense PGI, Lisboa PGI, Lisboa - Alta-Estremadura PGI, Lisboa-Estremadura PGI, Madeirense PDO, Minho PGI, Península de Setúbal PGI, Tejo PGI, Terras do Dão PGI, | Albano, Albana Secco, Biancone, Blanc Auba, Blanc de Cadillac, Blancoun, Bobiano, Bonebeou, Branquinha, Brocanico, Bubbiano, Buriano, Buzzetto, Cadillac, Cadillate, Castelli, Castelli Romani, Castillone, Chator, Clairette d'Afrique, Clairette de Vence, Clairette Ronde, Engana Rapazes, Espadeiro Branco, Falanchina, Greco, Gredelin, Hermitage White, Juni Blan, Lugana, Malvasia Fina, Muscadet Aigre, Padeiro Branco, Perugino, Procanico, Procanico Dell Isola d'Elba, Procanico Portoferraio, Queue de Renard, Romani, Rossan de Nice, Rossetto, Rossola, Rossula, Roussan, Roussea, Rusciola, Saint Emilion, Saint Emilion des Charentes, Santoro, Shiraz White, Spoletino, Talia, Trebbianello, Trebbiano, Trebbiano della Fiamma, Trebbiano di Cesene, Trebbiano di Empoli, Trebbiano di Lucca, Trebbiano di Tortona, Trebbiano Fiorentino, Trebbiano Toscano, Trebbianone, Tribbiano, Tribbiano Forte, Turbiano, Ugni Blanc, Bouan, Beau, Thalia, Trebbiano d'Abruzzo, Trebbiano di Soave, Trebbiano Gallo, Trebbiano Romagnolo, White Hermitage |
| Trebiano (See Trebbiano Toscano) | | | | | | |
| Trincadeira (See Trajadura) | | | | | | |
| Trincadeira Branca | 51012 | 14130 | B | Hebén = Mourisco Branco x Trousseau Noir = Bastardo | DoTejo PDO, Lisboa PGI, Lisboa - Alta-Estremadura PGI, Lisboa - Encostas d'Aire PDO, Lisboa-Estremadura PGI, Península de Setúbal PGI, Tejo PGI | Santarem Branco, Trincadeira, Trincadeira Branco, Trincadeiro Branco |
| Trincadeira das Pratas | 52216 | 15688 | B | Hebén = Mourisco Branco x Alfrocheiro Preto | Alentejo PDO, DoTejo PDO, Lisboa PGI, Lisboa - Alta-Estremadura PGI, Lisboa-Estremadura PGI, Península de Setúbal PGI, Tejo PGI | Arinto Gordo, Boal Prior, Tamarêz, Tamarêz d'Azeitão, Tamarêz do Alentejo |
| Trincadeiro do Douro (See Tamarez) | | | | | | |
| Ugni Blanc (See Trebbiano Toscano) | | | | | | |
| Uva Cão | 51415 | 12812 | B | Unknown | Beira Atlântico PGI, Península de Setúbal PGI, Terras do Dão PGI, (Note: WPL said the variety was being grown in small quantities in the Centro and Norte regions and cited a source saying that there were 0.4 ha reported in 2016.) | Cachorrinho |
| Uva Cavaco | 51211 | 23219 | B | Unknown | Península de Setúbal PGI | |
| Uva Rei (See Boal de Alicante Moscatel) | | | | | | |
| Uva Salsa | 50311 | As Chasselas Cioutat - 2476 | B | A laciniated leaf mutation of Chasselas Blanc | Península de Setúbal PGI | Africana, Chasselas à Feuille de Persil, Chasselas à Feuilles de Persil, Chasselas à Feuille Laciniées, Chasselas à Foglie di Prezzemolo, Chasselas à Foglie Frastagliate, Chasselas Cicutal, Chasselas Ciotat, Chasselas Ciotat Blanc, Chasselas Ciouta, Chasselas Ciutat, Chasselas Ciotat, Chasselas Ciotat Blanc, Chasselas Ciouta, Chasselas Cioutat, Chasselas Ciutat, Chasselas Ciutat, Chasselas d'Autriche, Chasselas Frastagliato, Chasselas Laciniato, Chasselas Laciniées, Chasselas Lacine, Chasselas Lacinefolie, Chasselas Patrunjel, Chasselas Persil, Chasselas Persille, Shasselas Salsa, Chiotat, Chrupka Petrzlenova, Ciotat, Cioutat, Csipkes Levelii Fabian, Csipkeslevelue Chasselas, Csipkeslevelue Fabian, De Spangna Veronese, Erabski, Fehér Petrezselem, Geschlitztblättriger Gutedel, Geschlitzter Gutedel Grün, Gutedel Geschlitzt Blättrig, Gutedel Geschlitztblättriger, Gutedel Geschlitzter, Jerusalemstraube, Jeruzalemszloeloe, Kremitscher, Malmsey, Malmsey Muscadine, Malvoisie, Parseley Lascinate Vine White, Parsely Ilascinate Vine, Parsley Leaved, Parsley Leaved Muscadine, Pata de Perdiz, Perejil, Persillade, Persilliere, Persunasta Sasla, Peterselyem Szoeloe, Peterselyer Szoeloe, Petersilien Gutedel, Peter silien Weinstock, Petersilka, Petrezselyemlevelue, Petrezselyemlevelue Chasselas, Petrezselyemlevelue Saszla, Petrezselyemszoeloe, Petrzelawe, Pirixileira, Plemenka, Plemenka Persinasta Bijela, Plemenka Regana, Raisin d'Autriche, Raisin de Virginie, Sasia Razsicennie, Schlitserredel, Shasla Rassechennaya, Spagnuola, Spagnuola dei Toscani, Spania, Spanier, Spaniger, Spanischer, Spanischer Gutedel, Spaniska, Spanolska Plemenka, Treille de Jericho, Uva d'Egitto, Uva da Vaso, Uva di Gerusalemme, Uva Salsa, Vite Meraviglia, White Parsley Leaved, Waelsche, Zlahtnina Narazljana |
| Uva sem Bagulho | | 12835 | B | Unknown | Unknown | |
| Vale Grosso (See Manteúdo) | | | | | | |
| Valente (See Branco Valente) | | | | | | |
| Valveirinho | | 12882 | B | Vital x Alvarinho | Península de Setúbal PGI | Valveirhina |
| Vencedor | 52111 | As Boal Vencedor - 14152 | B | Malvasia Fina x Cayetana Blanca = Sarigo | Península de Setúbal PGI | Boal Cachudo, Boal Vencedor |
| Verdelho | 51509 | As Verdelho Branco - 22304 | B | Savagnin Blanc = Traminer x ? | Açores - Biscoitos PDO, Açores - Graciosa PDO, Açores - Pico PDO, Alentejo PDO, Bairrada PDO, Beira Atlântico PGI, DoTejo PDO, Duriense PGI, Lisboa PGI, Lisboa - Alta-Estremadura PGI, Lisboa-Estremadura PGI, Lisboa - Óbidos PDO, Madeira PDO, Palmela PDO, Porto PDO, Setúbal PDO, Tejo PGI, Terras do Dão PGI, Transmontano PGI | Arinto da Terceira, Verdelho, Verdelho Branco, Verdelho Branco da Madeira, Verdelho Branco dos Açores, Verdelho da Madeira, Verdelho de Madeire, Verdelho de Madere, Verdelho de Pico, Verdelho di Madera, Verdelho dos Açores, Verdelho Pico, Verdellio, Verdello, Verdello de Galicia, Verdello no Peluda Finca Natero, Weißer Verdelho |
| Verdelho 11 (Note: FPS advises, "This white wine grape selection was donated to the Foundation Plant Services public grapevine collection in 2007 by Jorge Böhm, Viveiros Plansel S.A., Portugal. It is JPB clone 300 from Madeira. The original plant material tested positive for virus and underwent microshoot tip tissue culture therapy at FPS in 2008. The treated material qualified for the California Grapevine Registration & Certification Program in 2012 as Verdelho 11.") | | | B | A clone of Verdelho | Unknown | |
| Verdelho 11.1 (Note: FPS advises, "This white wine grape selection was donated to the Foundation Plant Services public grapevine collection in 2007 by Jorge Böhm, Viveiros Plansel S.A., Portugal. It is JPB clone 300. The original plant material tested positive for virus and underwent microshoot tip tissue culture therapy at FPS in 2008. The treated material qualified for the FPS foundation vineyard in 2012 as Verdelho 11.1. The treated material also successfully completed testing to qualify for the Russell Ranch Foundation Vineyard in 2014.") | | | B | A clone of Verdelho | Unknown | |
| Verdelho 11.2 (Note: FPS advises, "This white wine selection was donated to the public grapevine collection at Foundation Plant Services in 2007 by Jorge Böhm, Viveiros Plansel S.A., in Portugal. The material is JBP clone 300 from Madeira. The original material tested positive for virus and underwent microshoot tip tissue culture therapy at FPS in 2008. This selection was planted as a backup selection to Verdelho 11 once disease testing was completed in 2012. The name for the selection was changed in 2014 when the material successfully passed 2010 Protocol testing for Russell Ranch. There are vines in the Classic Foundation Vineyard for Verdelho 11.2.") | | | B | A clone of Verdelho | Unknown | |
| Verdial Branco | | As Alva Verdial - 23980 | B | Unknown | Beira Atlântico PGI, Douro PDO, Madeirense PDO, Península de Setúbal PGI, Terras do Dão PGI, | Alva Verdial, Verdial |
| Viognier | | 13106 | B | Unknown | Alentejo PDO, Beira Atlântico PGI, DoTejo PDO, Duriense PGI, Lisboa PGI, Lisboa - Alta-Estremadura PGI, Lisboa-Estremadura PGI, Lisboa - Óbidos PDO, Península de Setúbal PGI, Tejo PGI | Galopine, Petit Viognier, Petit Vionnier, Viogné, Viogner, Viognier Bijeli, Viognier Blanc, Viognier Jaune, Viognier Vert, Vionjer, Vionnier, Vionnier Jaune, Vionnier Petit, Vionnier Vert |
| Viosinho | 52715 | 13109 | B | Savagnin Blanc = Traminer x ? | Alentejo PDO, Beira Atlântico PGI, DoTejo PDO, Douro PDO, Lisboa PGI, Lisboa - Alenquer PDO, Lisboa - Alta-Estremadura PGI, Lisboa - Arruda PDO, Lisboa-Estremadura PGI, Lisboa - Óbidos PDO, Lisboa - Torres Vedras PDO, Minho PGI, Palmela PDO, Porto PDO, Península de Setúbal PGI, Setúbal PDO, Tejo PGI, Terras do Dão PGI, Transmontano PGI, Trás-os-Montes - Chaves PDO, Trás-os-Montes - Planalto Mirandês PDO, Trás-os-Montes - Vàlpaçôs PDO | Veozinho Verdeal |
| Vital | 52614 | 13122 | B | Malvasia Fina x Rabo de Ovelha | Beira Atlântico PGI, DoTejo PDO, Douro PDO, Lisboa PGI, Lisboa - Alenquer PDO, Lisboa - Alta-Estremadura PGI, Lisboa - Encostas d'Aire PDO, Lisboa-Estremadura PGI, Lisboa - Óbidos PDO, Lisboa - Torres Vedras PDO, Península de Setúbal PGI, Porto PDO, Tejo PGI, Terras do Dão PGI, Transmontano PGI | Boal Bonifacio, Cagado dos Pardais, Malvasia Corada, Malvasia Fina (not to be confused with the Malvasia Fina variety), Malvasia Fina de Douro, Malvasia Fina do Douro, Malvasia ou Malvazia, Malvazia Corada |

== Other recommended lists ==
- Castas portuguesas (Portuguese varieties) (In Portuguese)
- List of Port wine grapes
- Regiões (Regions)

== Supplemental references used for charts ==
- "Catálogo Nacional de Variedades de Videira" (National Catalogue of Vine Varieties or NCVV). Direção-Geral de Alimentação e Veterinária, Ministério da Agricultura, Florestas e Desenvolvimento Rural (Directorate-General for Food and Animal Health, Ministry of Agriculture, Forestry and Rural Development). 2017. Accessed 18 January 2021.
- Cunha, Jorge Manuel Martins, João Brazão, Margarida Teixeira-Santos, José Eduardo Eiras-Dias, P. Fevereiro, Jose Miguel Martinez-Zapater, et al. "A identidade das castas de videira portuguesas aptas à produção de vinho no contexto ibérico e europeu. O uso de marcadores moleculares do tipo SNP para a sua discriminação" (The identity of Portuguese grape varieties suitable for wine production in the Iberian and European context. The use of molecular markers of the SNP type for their discrimination), Instituto Nacional de Investigação Agrária e Veterinãria (National Institute for Agricultural and Veterinary Research or INIAV), January/February/March 2017. p. 18. Available online at . Accessed 24 December 2020.
- Ferreira, Vanessa, Olinda Pinto-Carnide, Teresa Mota, Juan Pedro Martin, Jéus M Ortiz and Isaura Castro. "Identification of minority grapevine cultivars from Vinhos Verdes Portuguese DOC Region." Vitis, Vol 54 (Special edition), 2015. p. 55. Available on ResearchGate at Accessed 1 February 2021.
- "FPS Grape Registry: Grapevine Varieties." Foundation Plant Services, College of Agricultural and Environmental Sciences, University of California, Davis. Accessed 23 February 2020.
- "Guide to Portuguese Grape Varieties". Cellar Tours. Accessed 13 November 2009.
- "Lista da Castas" (List of Grape Varieties). Instituto da Vinha e do Vinho, I.P. 2018.. Accessed 20 February 2020.
- Maul, Erika, et al. "Vitis International Variety Catalogue" (VIVC). Julius Kühn-Institut - Federal Research Centre for Cultivated Plants (JKI), Institute for Grapevine Breeding. 2020. Accessed 23 February 2020.
- Mayson, Richard. The Wines of Portugal. Infinite Ideas, 2019. ISBN 978-1-999619-30-5
- Robinson, Jancis. Vines, Grapes & Wines, pp. 215–219 & 246-249. Mitchell Beazley, 1986. ISBN 1-85732-999-6.
- Robinson and Julia Harding, et al. The Oxford Companion to Wine. 4th Edition. Edited by Jancis Robinson and Julia Harding. Oxford University Press, 2015. ISBN 978-0-19-870538-3
- Robinson, Harding and José Vouillamoz. Wine Grapes: A complete guide to 1,368 vine varieties, including their origins and flavours. HarperCollins, 2013. ISBN 0-14-196882-6. Access available online at Apple Books. ISBN 0-06-232551-5. Accessed 20 February 2020. (NB When viewing this text online, the page numbering varies depending on the settings in View. All grape varieties are listed alphabetically.)
- Tischelmayer, Norbert, et al. Glossary. Wein.Plus (WPL). Accessed 20 February 2020.

== Bibliography ==
- Anderson, Kym, and Signe Nelgen. Which Winegrape is Grown Where?: A Global Empirical Picture, Revised Edition. Edited by Kym Anderson and N R Aryal. University of Adelaide Press, 2020. ISBN 978-1-925261-86-8 Published online 2020. ISBN 978-1-925261-87-5.
- Castro, Isauro, Olinda Pinto-Carnide, Jesús-María Ortiz, Vanessa Ferreira and Juan Pedro Martín. "A comparative analysis of genetic diversity in Portuguese grape germplasm from ampelographic collections fit for quality wine production." Spanish Journal of Agricultural Research, Volume 14, Issue 4, 2016. pp. 1–11. Available online at ResearchGate. Accessed 3 January 2021.
- "Catálogo Nacional de Variedades de Videira" (National Catalogue of Vine Varieties or NCVV). Direção-Geral de Alimentação e Veterinária, Ministério da Agricultura, Florestas e Desenvolvimento Rural (Directorate-General for Food and Animal Health, Ministry of Agriculture, Forestry and Rural Development). 2017.
- Cunha, Jorge Manuel Martins, João Brazão, Margarida Teixeira-Santos, José Eduardo Eiras-Dias, P. Fevereiro, Jose Miguel Martinez-Zapater, et al. "A identidade das castas de videira portuguesas aptas à produção de vinho no contexto ibérico e europeu. O uso de marcadores moleculares do tipo SNP para a sua discriminação" (The identity of Portuguese grape varieties suitable for wine production in the Iberian and European context. The use of molecular markers of the SNP type for their discrimination), Instituto Nacional de Investigação Agrária e Veterinãria (National Institute for Agricultural and Veterinary Research or INIAV), January/February/March 2017. Available online at .
- Ferreira, Vanessa, Olinda Pinto-Carnide, Teresa Mota, Juan Pedro Martin, Jéus M Ortiz and Isaura Castro. "Identification of minority grapevine cultivars from Vinhos Verdes Portuguese DOC Region." Vitis, Vol 54 (Special edition), 2015. p. 55. Available online at ResearchGate at
- Mayson, Richard. The Wines of Portugal. Infinite Ideas, 2019. ISBN 978-1-999619-30-5
- Santos, Micael Queiroga dos, Xosé Antón Rodríguez, Ana Alexandra Marta-Costa. "Efficiency analysis of viticulture systems in the Portuguese Douro region." International Journal of Wine Business Research, Vol 32 No 4, 2020. pp. 573–591. Acvailable online at ResearchGate.
- Oczkowski, Eddie. "The strategic use of synonyms for varietal names in labelling." Winetitles Media, November 2018.
- Robinson, Jancis. Vines, Grapes & Wines. Mitchell Beazley, 1986. ISBN 1-85732-999-6.
- Robinson and Julia Harding, et al. The Oxford Companion to Wine. 4th Edition. Edited by Jancis Robinson and Julia Harding. Oxford University Press, 2015. ISBN 978-0-19-870538-3
- Robinson, Harding and José Vouillamoz. Wine Grapes: A complete guide to 1,368 vine varieties, including their origins and flavours. HarperCollins, 2013. ISBN 0-14-196882-6. Available online at Apple Books. ISBN 0-06-232551-5.
