= Península de Setúbal VR =

Portuguese wine region

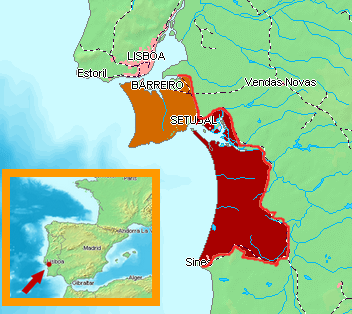
Península de Setúbal, formerly Terras do Sado

Península de Setúbal, until 2009 named Terras do Sado, is a Portuguese wine region covering Península de Setúbal and most of the Sado River region. The area is classified as a Vinho Regional (VR), a designation similar to a French vin de pays region. With the Setúbal DOC to the northwest and the Atlantic Ocean to the west, the region is almost completely surrounded by the Alentejo VR.

In 2009, the region was renamed from Terras do Sado to Península de Setúbal, to associate the region's name with the name of its internationally most well-known subregion, Setúbal.

== Subregions ==
Within the Península de Setúbal region there are two designated subregions with a higher level of wine classification:

- Palmela DOC
- Setúbal DOC

== Grapes ==
Red wines produced under the Península de Setúbal VR must contain a blend of at least 50% Aragonez, Cabernet Sauvignon, Merlot, Moscatel Roxo, Periquita, Tinta Amarela and Touriga Nacional. The remaining 50% can include Alfrocheiro Preto, Alicante Bouschet, Bastardo, Carignan, Grand noir, Monvedro, Moreto and Tinta Miuda. The white wines of the region must contain at least 50% Arinto, Chardonnay, Fernão Pires, Malvasia Fina, Muscat of Alexandria and Roupeiro. The remaining 50% can include Antão Vaz, Esgana Cão, Sauvignon blanc, Rabo de Ovelha, Trincadeira das Pratas and Ugni blanc.

== See also ==
- List of Portuguese wine regions
