= Beiras wine region =

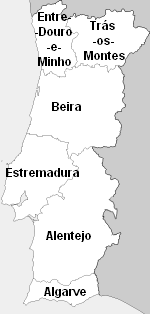
Beiras region within Portugal

Beiras is a Portuguese wine region producing wines with the classification Denominação de Origem Controlada. Located in the northern regions of Portugal, the Beiras region produces a wide range of wines, including sparkling and fortified wine. Quality varies dramatically depending on producer and region.

== Wine regions ==
Within the Beiras, the following regions exist at the IPR or DOC level:

- Dão DOC
- Bairrada DOC
- Beira Interior DOC, with the following three subregions:
  - Castelo Rodrigo, formerly a separate IPR
  - Cova de Beira, formerly a separate IPR
  - Pinhel, formerly a separate IPR
- Lafoes IPR
- Távora-Varosa DOC
- Encostas da Nave IPR
- Encostas d'Aire DOC-overlaps with the Lisboa VR

== Grapes ==
The main grapes of the Beiras region include Arinto, Baga, Bastardo, Borrado das Moscas, Camarate, Sercial, Fernão Pires, Jaen, Malvasia, Marufo, Monvedro, Periquita, Rabo de Ovelha, Rufete, Tinta Amarela, Touriga Nacional and Vital.

== See also ==
- List of Portuguese wine regions
