= Valpaços wine =

Portuguese wine region

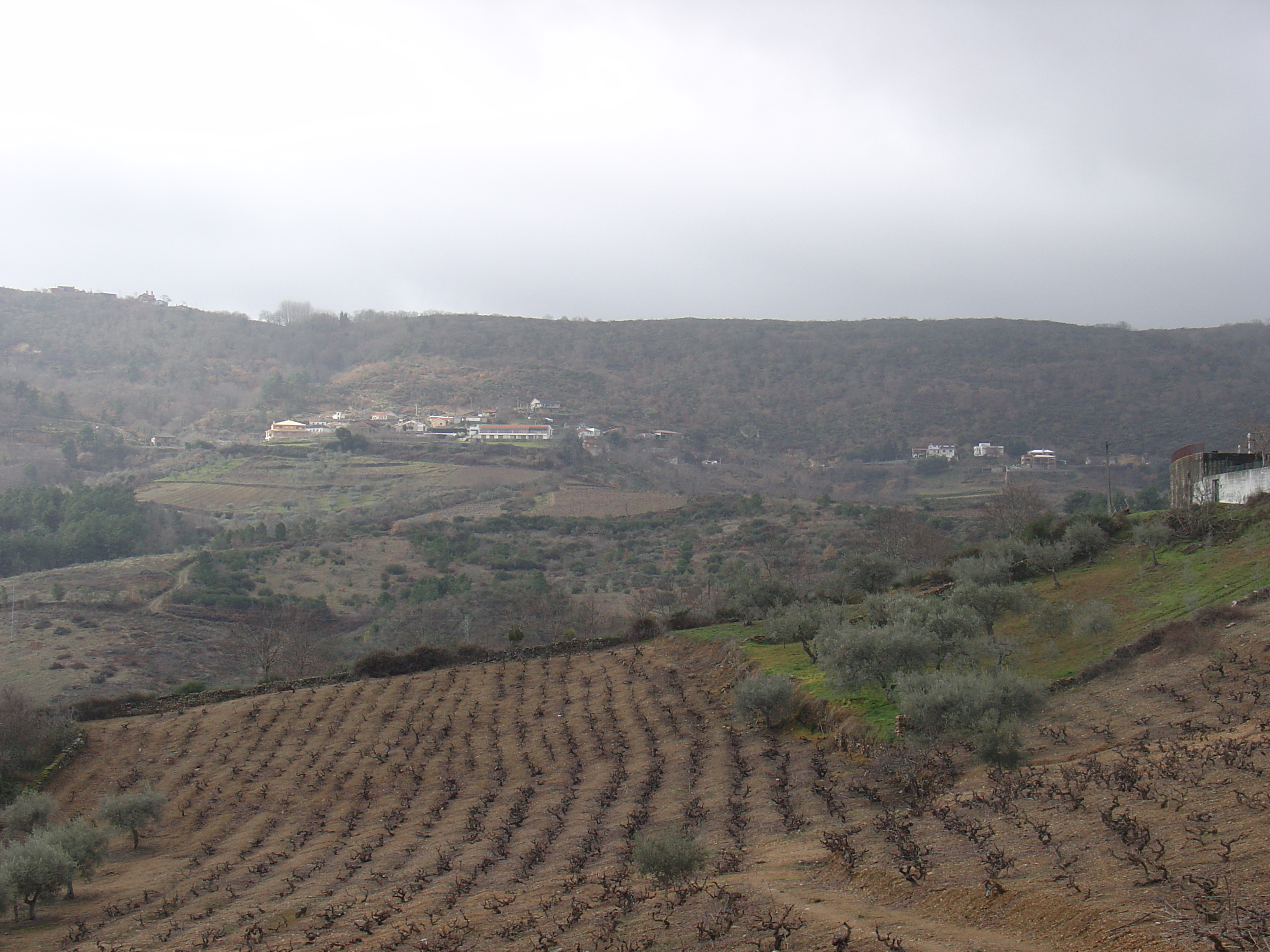
Vineyards in the Valpaços region.

Valpaços is a Portuguese wine region centered on the town of Valpaços in the Trás-os-Montes e Alto Douro region. The region was initially a separate Indicação de Proveniencia Regulamentada (IPR) region, but in 2006, it became one of three subregions of the Trás-os-Montes DOC, which has the higher Denominação de Origem Controlada (DOC) status. Its name may still be indicated together with that of Trás-os-Montes, as Trás-os-Montes-Valpaços. Located along the Tua River, the region is known for its slightly sparkling rosé.

== Grapes ==
The principle grapes of the Valpaços region include Bastardo, Boal, Codega, Cornifesto, Fernao Pires, Gouveio, Malvasia Fina, Mourisco Tinto, Rabo de Ovelha, Tempranillo, Tinta Amarela, Tinta Carvalha, Touriga Francesa and Touriga Nacional.

== See also ==
- List of Portuguese wine regions
