= Palmela DOC =

Portuguese wine region

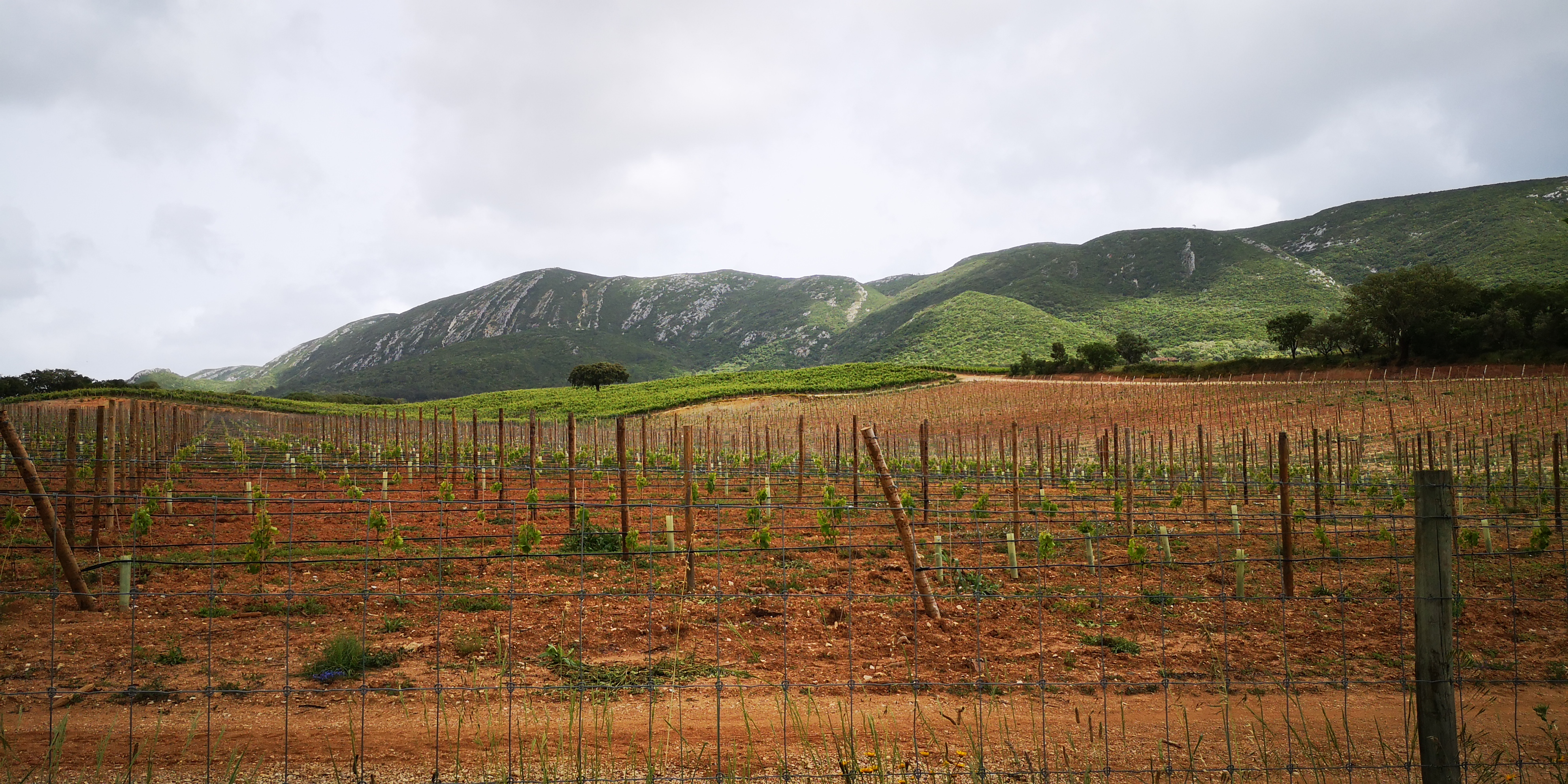
Vineyards at the foot of Serra da Arrábida

Palmela is a Portuguese wine region centered on the town of Palmela in the Setúbal Peninsula subregion. The wine region has the Denominação de Origem Controlada (DOC) status after having been elevated from its former Indicação de Proveniencia Regulamentada (IPR) status. At the same time, the former Arrábida IPR, centered on the Arrabida hills, was absorbed into Palmela DOC.

Palmela first gained attention for its off dry white wines made from Muscat grapes harvested early but has recently turned its attention to producing dry red and white table wines. The soil of the area of the former Arrábida IPR is predominantly limestone with good drainage potential for the cultivation of red wine varieties.

== Grapes ==
The principal grapes of the Palmela region (including the former Arrábida IPR) include Alfrocheiro, Arinto, Cabernet Sauvignon, Fernao Pires, Muscat of Alexandria, Periquita, Rabo de Ovelha, Roupeiro, Tamarez and Tinta Amarela.

== See also ==
- List of Portuguese wine regions
