= Cova da Beira wine =

Portuguese wine region

Cova da Beira is a Portuguese wine region centered on the Cova da Beira region between the Dão and Vinho Verde DOCs in the wider Beiras VR wine region. Cova da Beira was initially a separate Indicação de Proveniencia Regulamentada (IPR) region (and was the largest IPR in Portugal in terms of land planted with vines), but in 2005, it became one of three subregions of the Beira Interior DOC, which has the higher Denominação de Origem Controlada (DOC) status. Its name may still be indicated together with that of Beira Interior, as Beira Interior-Cova da Beira.

Cova da Beira produces a broad range of wines similar to those found in the Beiras wine region but is primarily known for its light bodied red wines.

== Grapes ==
The principal grapes of the Cova da Beira region include Arinto, Assario Branco, Jaen, Marufo, Periquita, Perola, Rabo de Ovelha, Rufete and Tinta Amarela.

== See also ==
- List of Portuguese wine regions
