= Vidigueira wine =

Vidigueira (European Portuguese pronunciation: [viðiˈɣɐjɾɐ]) is a Portuguese wine region centered on the Vidigueira municipality in the Alentejo region. The region was initially an Indicação de Proveniencia Regulamentada (IPR) region, then elevated to Denominação de Origem Controlada (DOC) status. In 2003, it became one of eight subregions of the Alentejo DOC. Its name may still be indicated together with that of Alentejo, as Alentejo-Vidigueira.

Within Alentejo DOC, this subregion is bordered by the Reguengos subregion to the northeast and the Moura subregion to the southeast. Viticulture has a long history in the volcanic soils of the region with name Vidigueira itself being derived from the Portuguese videira meaning "wine". Vidigueira produces primarily white wine.

== Grapes ==
The principle grapes of the Vidigueira region includes Alfrocheiro, Antão Vaz, Manteudo, Moreto, Periquita, Perrum, Rabo de Ovelha, Roupeiro and Trincadeira.

== See also ==
- List of Portuguese wine regions
