= Tejo wine region =

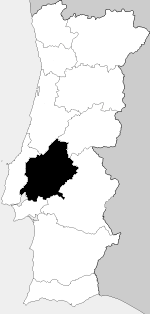
Tejo VR/Ribatejo Province

Tejo, until 2009 named Ribatejo, is a Portuguese wine region covering the same areas as the Ribatejo Province. It takes its name from the river Tejo (Tagus). The entire region is entitled to use the Vinho Regional designation Tejo VR, while some areas are also classified at the higher Denominação de Origem Controlada (DOC) level under the designation DoTejo DOC. VR is similar to the French vin de pays and DOC to the French AOC.

Located between the Lisboa and Alentejo VRs, the region is dominated by the influence of the Tagus river. The river moderates the region's climate, making it more temperate than other areas of Portugal. Vineyards are planted on the fertile alluvial plains along the river and can be prone to producing excessive yields.

In 2009, the region was renamed from Ribatejo to Tejo, the same name as the river flowing through the region, as part of a drive to increase the wine region's international reputation. However, the DOC has kept its name Ribatejo, which removed the previous problem of having the same name applied to wines at two different levels of classification.

== Subregions ==
There are six subregions of the Tejo region that are entitled to the Ribatejo DOC designation. The names of the subregions may be indicated on the label together with the name Ribatejo, for example as Ribatejo-Cartoxa. These subregions were initially created as separate Indicação de Proveniencia Regulamentada (IPR) wine regions, but in 2003, these IPRs were put together as the Ribatejo DOC. The six subregions are the following:

- Almeirim
- Cartaxo - Overlaps into the Lisboa VR
- Chamusca
- Coruche
- Santarém
- Tomar

== Grapes ==
The principal grapes of the Tejo region includes Arinto, Cabernet Sauvignon, Camarate, Carignan, Chardonnay, Esgana Cão, Fernão Pires, Jampal, Malvasia Fina, Malvasia Rei, Merlot, Periquita, Pinot noir, Rabo de Ovelha, Sauvignon blanc, Syrah, Tamarez, Tinta Amarela, Tinta Muida, Touriga Nacional, Trincadeira das Pratas, Ugni blanc and Vital.

== See also ==
- List of Portuguese wine regions
