= Redondo wine =

Wine region in Redondo, Alentejo, Portugal

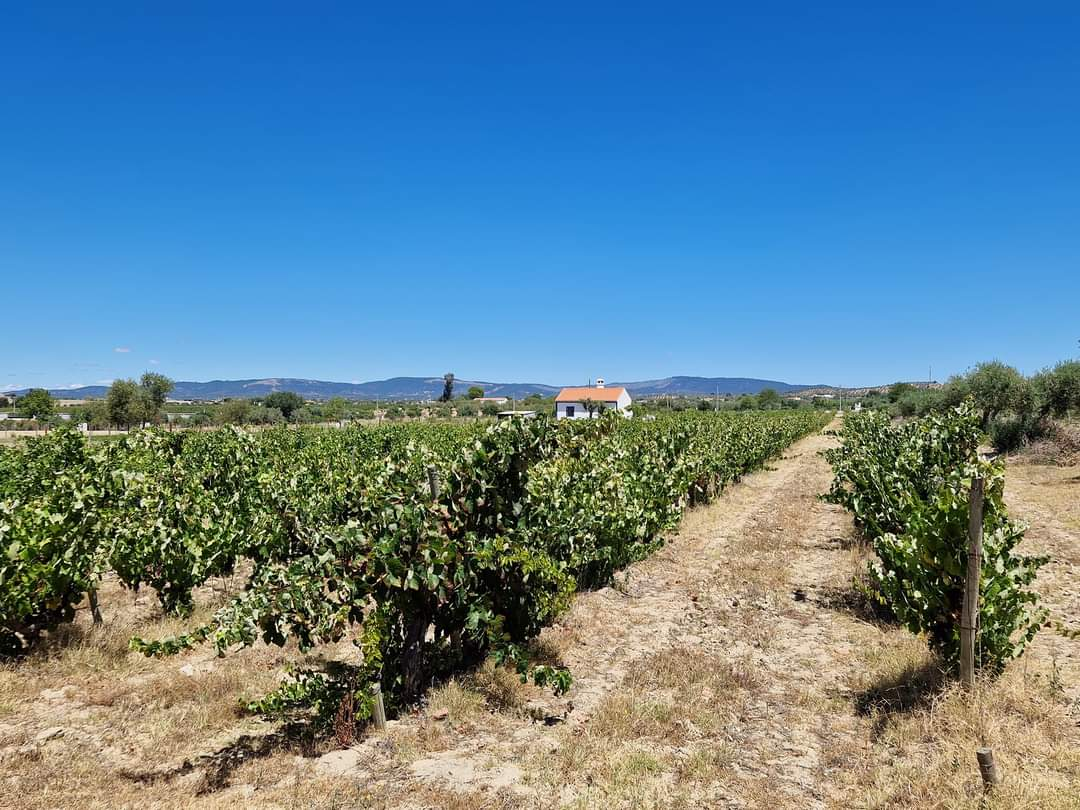

Redondo is a Portuguese wine region centered on the Redondo municipality in the Alentejo region. The region was initially an Indicação de Proveniencia Regulamentada (IPR) region, then elevated to Denominação de Origem Controlada (DOC) status. In 2003, it became one of eight subregions of the Alentejo DOC. Its name may still be indicated together with that of Alentejo, as Alentejo-Redondo.

The region is bordered by the Borba subregion to the northeast, the Evora subregion to the west and the Reguengos subregion to the southeast. The area is known predominantly for its fruity red wines.

In 2025, the municipality of Redondo submitted a bid together with its wine-producing neighbours of Alandroal, Borba, Estremoz, and Vila Viçosa, under the collective title of Vinhos de Serra d'Ossa (Wines of Serra d'Ossa, the mountain range around which they are clustered), and they were awarded the prestigious Cidade do Vinho (City of Wine) status for 2025 by the Associação de Municípios Portugueses do Vinho.

== Grapes ==
The principle grapes of the Redondo region includes Aragonez, Fernao Pires, Manteudo, Moreto, Periquita, Rabo de Ovelha, Roupeiro, Tamarez and Trincadeira.

== See also ==
- List of Portuguese wine regions
