= Santarém wine =

Santarém is a Portuguese wine region centered on the town of Santarém in the Ribatejo region. The region was initially a separate Indicação de Proveniência Regulamentada (IPR) region, but in 2003, it became one of six subregions of the Ribatejo DOC, which has the higher Denominação de Origem Controlada (DOC) status. Its name may still be indicated together with that of Ribatejo, as Ribatejo-Santarém.

== Grapes ==
The principal grapes of the Santarém region include Arinto, Castelão Nacional, Fernão Pires, Periquita, Preto Martinho, Rabo de Ovelha, Tinta Amarela, Trincadeira das Pratas, Ugni blanc and Vital.

== See also ==
- List of Portuguese wine regions
