= Trás-os-Montes wine region =

Wine making region in Portugal

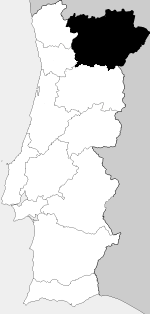
Tras-os-Montes

Trás-os-Montes is a Portuguese wine region located in the Trás-os-Montes e Alto Douro region. The entire wine region is entitled to use the Vinho Regional designation Transmontano VR, while some areas are also classified at the higher Denominação de Origem Controlada (DOC) level under the designation Trás-os-Montes DOC. VR is similar to the French vin de pays and DOC to the French AOC.

Located in the northeastern corner of Portugal, the Trás-os-Montes region has vineyards across a wide range of altitudes that produces a vast spectrum of wine. The vineyards in the cooler high altitude produces wines that are light bodied while the lower altitude region produces full bodied, highly alcoholic wines. One of the first wines to gain international attention was the semi-sweet, semi-sparkling wine known as rosado.

Douro DOC, which is famous as the Port wine region, is also located in Trás-os-Montes e Alto Douro and could use the former Trás-os-Montes VR designation. However, with the creation of a separate Duriense VR, Douro vineyards are now separate from both the Trás-os-Montes DOC and Transmontano VR.

== Subregions ==
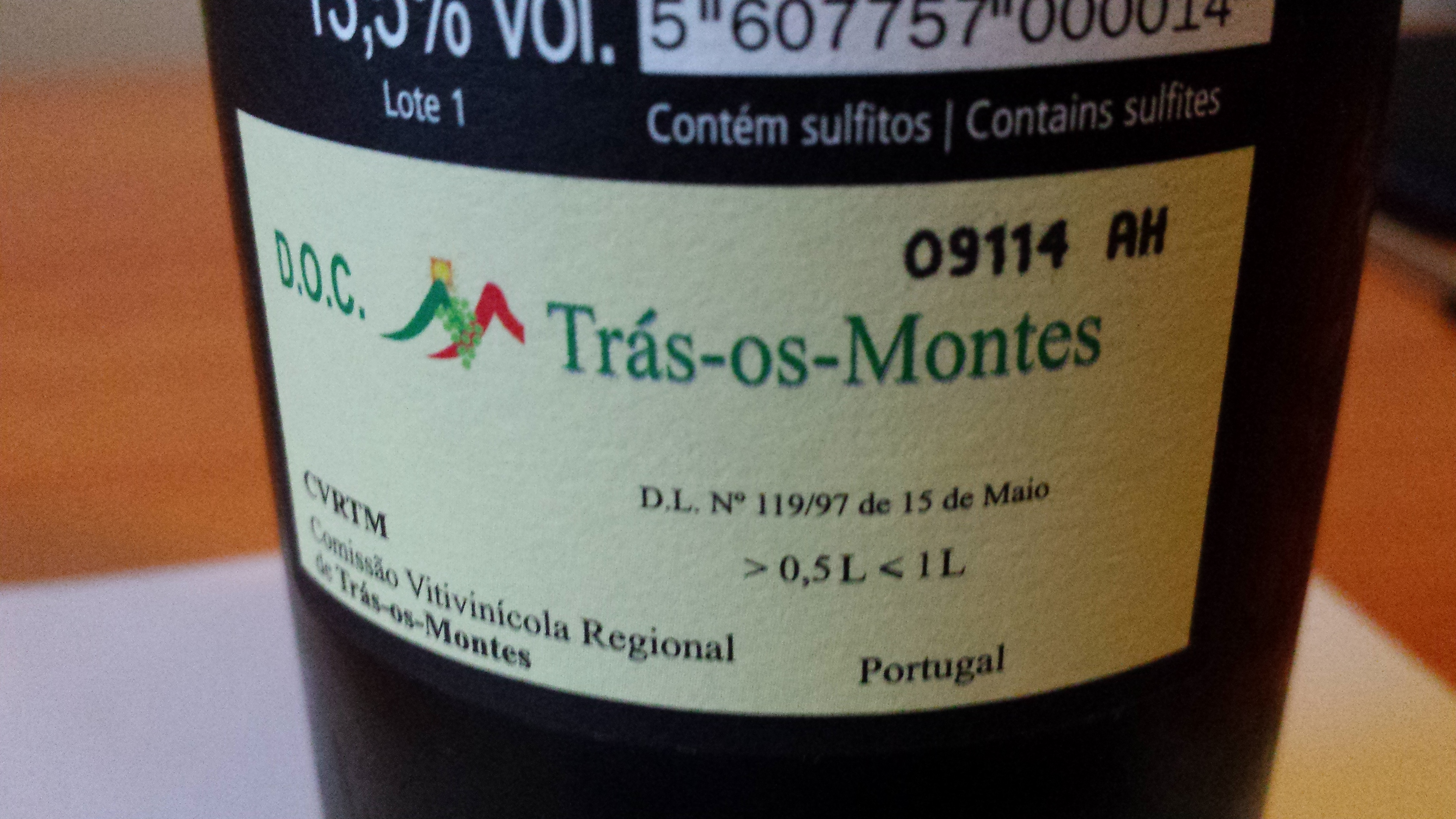
DOC Trás-os-Montes

There are three subregions of the Trás-os-Montes region that are entitled to the Trás-os-Montes DOC designation. The names of the subregions may be indicated on the label together with the name Trás-os-Montes, for example as Trás-os-Montes-Chaves. These subregions were initially created as separate Indicação de Proveniencia Regulamentada (IPR) wine regions, and in 2006 were put together as the Trás-os-Montes DOC. The three subregions are:

- Chaves
- Planalto Mirandês
- Valpaços

== Grapes ==
The principal grapes of the Trás-os-Montes region include Bastardo, Cabernet Franc, Cabernet Sauvignon, Chardonnay, Donzelinho branco, Gewürztraminer, Gouveio, Malvasia Fina, Merlot, Mourisco Tinto, Pinot noir, Rabo de Ovelha, Sauvignon blanc, Semillon, Tempranillo, Tinta Amarela, Tinta Barroca, Tinta Cao, Touriga Francesa, Touriga Nacional and Viosinho.

== See also ==
- List of Portuguese wine regions
