= Chamusca wine =

Portuguese wine region

Chamusca is a Portuguese wine region centered on the town of Chamusca in the Ribatejo region. The region was initially a separate Indicação de Proveniencia Regulamentada (IPR) region, but in 2003, it became one of six subregions of the Ribatejo DOC, which has the higher Denominação de Origem Controlada (DOC) status. Its name may still be indicated together with that of Ribatejo, as Ribatejo-Chamusca. Located east of Almeirim IPR, the wines of this region are very similar to Almeirim.

== Grapes ==
The principle grapes of the Chamusca region include Arinto, Castelao Nacional, Fernao Pires, Periquita, Tinta Amarela, Trincadeira das Pratas, Ugni blanc and Vital.

== See also ==
- List of Portuguese wine regions
