= Planalto Mirandês wine =

Planalto Mirandes is a Portuguese wine region centered on the town of Miranda do Douro in the Trás-os-Montes e Alto Douro region. The region was initially a separate Indicação de Proveniencia Regulamentada (IPR) region, but in 2006, it became one of three subregions of the Trás-os-Montes DOC, which has the higher Denominação de Origem Controlada (DOC) status. Its name may still be indicated together with that of Trás-os-Montes, as Trás-os-Montes-Planalto Mirandês.

Located in the very north eastern corner of Portugal, the region borders Spain and produces full bodied red and white wines.

== Grapes ==
The principle grapes of the Planalto Mirandes region include Bastardo, Gouveio, Malvasia Fina, Mourisco Tinto, Rabo de Ovelha, Tinta Amarela, Touriga Francesa, Touriga Nacional and Viosinho.

== See also ==
- List of Portuguese wine regions
