= Évora wine =

Wine region in Évora, Alentejo, Portugal

Évora is a Portuguese wine region centered on the town of Évora in the Alentejo region. The region was initially a separate Indicação de Proveniência Regulamentada (IPR) region, but in 2003, it became one of eight subregions of the Alentejo DOC, which has the higher Denominação de Origem Controlada (DOC) status. Its name may still be indicated together with that of Alentejo, as Alentejo-Évora.

The region is known for its creamy, full bodied red wines.

== Grapes ==
The principle grapes of the Évora region include Aragonez, Arinto, Periquita, Rabo de Ovelha, Roupeiro, Tamarez, Tinta Caiada and Trincadeira.

== See also ==
- List of Portuguese wine regions
