= Cartaxo wine =

Portuguese wine region

Cartaxo is a Portuguese wine region centered on the town of Cartaxo and overlapping the Estremadura and Ribatejo VR regions. The region was initially a separate Indicação de Proveniencia Regulamentada (IPR) region, but in 2003, it became one of six subregions of the Ribatejo DOC, which has the higher Denominação de Origem Controlada (DOC) status. Its name may still be indicated together with that of Ribatejo, as Ribatejo-Cartaxo.

The region is known for simple, fruity red and white wines.

== Grapes ==
The principle grapes of the Cartaxo region include Arinto, Castelao Nacional, Fernao Pires, Periquita, Preto Martinho, Tinta Amarela, Trincadeira das Pratas, Ugni blanc and Vital.

== See also ==
- List of Portuguese wine regions
