= Távora-Varosa DOC =

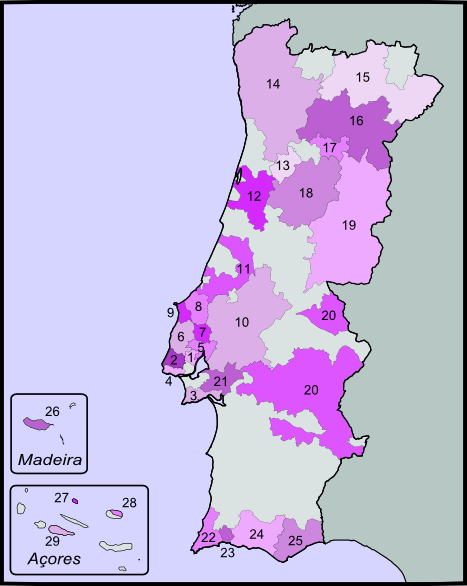
Map of the DOCs and IPRs of Portugal - number 17 is Távora-Varosa DOC.

Távora-Varosa is a Portuguese wine region located in the northwestern section of the Beiras region. The region is designated as Denominação de Origem Controlada (DOC) after it was promoted from its former Indicação de Proveniencia Regulamentada (IPR) status, when it was called Varosa IPR. At the same time, the former Encostas da Nave IPR, bordering the Douro, was absorbed into the Távora-Varosa DOC.

The white wines of Távora-Varosa have traditionally been used by Portuguese sparkling wine producers as part of a base cuvée, while the wines of the former Encostas da Nave IPR are very similar to the wines of the Douro region.

== Grapes ==
The principle grapes of the Távora-Varosa region (including the former Encostas da Nave IPR) include Alvarelhão, Arinto, Borrado das Moscas, Cercial, Chardonnay, Fernão Pires, Folgosão, Gouveio, Malvasia Fina, Mourisco Tinto, Pinot blanc, Pinot noir, Tempranillo, Tinta Barroca, Touriga Francesa and Touriga Nacional.

== See also ==
- List of Portuguese wine regions
