= Almeirim wine =

Almeirim is a Portuguese wine region centered on the town of Almeirim in the Ribatejo wine region. The region was initially a separate Indicação de Proveniencia Regulamentada (IPR) region, but in 2003, it became one of six subregions of the Ribatejo DOC, which has the higher Denominação de Origem Controlada (DOC) status. Its name may still be indicated together with that of Ribatejo, as Ribatejo-Almeirim.

Vineyards are planted in the fertile plains region and along the left bank of the Tagus river.

== Grapes ==
The principle grapes of the Almeirim region include Arinto, Baga, Fernao Pires, Periquita (or Castelão), Rabo de Ovelha, Tinta Amarela (or Trincadeira), Trincadeira das Pratas, Ugni blanc and Vital.

== See also ==
- List of Portuguese wine regions
