= Tomar wine =

Tomar is a Portuguese wine region centered on the town of Tomar in the Ribatejo region. The region was initially a separate Indicação de Proveniencia Regulamentada (IPR) region, but in 2003, it became one of six subregions of the Ribatejo DOC, which has the higher Denominação de Origem Controlada (DOC) status. Its name may still be indicated together with that of Ribatejo, as Ribatejo-Tomar.

Vineyards are planted on the limestone slopes along the right bank of the Tagus river.

== Grapes ==
The principle grapes of the Tomar region include Arinto, Baga, Castelao Nacional, Fernao Pires, Malvasia, Periquita, Rabo de Ovelha, and Ugni blanc.

== See also ==
- List of Portuguese wine regions
