= Moura wine =

Wine region in Portugal

Moura is a Portuguese wine region centered on the town of Moura in the Alentejo wine region. The region was initially a separate Indicação de Proveniencia Regulamentada (IPR) region, but in 2003, it became one of eight subregions of the Alentejo DOC, which has the higher Denominação de Origem Controlada (DOC) status. Its name may still be indicated together with that of Alentejo, as Alentejo-Moura.

Vineyards in this warm climate region are planted in cool, red clay based soils that can extend the grape's ripening period and add finesse to the wines.

== Grapes ==
The principle grapes of the Moura region include Alfrocheiro, Antao Vaz, Fernao Pires, Moreto, Periquita, Rabo de Ovelha, Rouperio and Trincadeira.

== See also ==
- List of Portuguese wine regions
