= Reguengos wine =

Reguengos is a Portuguese wine region centered on the Reguengos de Monsaraz municipality in the Alentejo region. The region was initially an Indicação de Proveniencia Regulamentada (IPR) region, then elevated to Denominação de Origem Controlada (DOC) status. In 2003, it became one of eight subregions of the Alentejo DOC. Its name may still be indicated together with that of Alentejo, as Alentejo-Reguengos.

The region is bordered by the Redondo subregion to the north and the Granja-Amarelja subregion to the southeast.

== Grapes ==
The principal grapes of the Reguengos region include Aragonez, Manteudo, Moreto, Periquita, Perrum, Rabo de Ovelha, Roupeiro and Trincadeira.

== See also ==
- List of Portuguese wine regions
