= Castelo Rodrigo wine =

Portuguese wine region

Coordinates: 40.883333°N 6.95°W

Castelo Rodrigo (Portuguese pronunciation: [kɐʃˈtɛlu ʁuˈdɾiɣu]) is a Portuguese wine region centered on the town of Figueira de Castelo Rodrigo in the wider Beiras wine region south of the Douro river. Castelo Rodrigo was initially a separate Indicação de Proveniencia Regulamentada (IPR) region, but in 2005, it became one of three subregions of the Beira Interior DOC, which has the higher Denominação de Origem Controlada (DOC) status. Its name may still be indicated together with that of Beira Interior, as Beira Interior-Castelo Rodrigo.

Located along the border with Spain, this warm climate region is known for its full bodied, spicy red wines.

== Grapes ==
The principal grapes of the Castelo Rodrigo region include Arinto, Assario Branco, Bastardo, Codo, Fonte Cal, Marufo, Rufete and Touriga Nacional.

== See also ==
- List of Portuguese wine regions
