= Granja-Amareleja wine =

Portuguese wine region

Granja-Amareleja is a Portuguese wine region centered on the town of Mourão in the Alentejo region. The region was initially a separate Indicação de Proveniencia Regulamentada (IPR) region, but in 2003, it became one of eight subregions of the Alentejo DOC, which has the higher Denominação de Origem Controlada (DOC) status. Its name may still be indicated together with that of Alentejo, as Alentejo-Granja-Amareleja.

The combination of the region's schist-based soils and harsh climate has the potential to produce bold, full bodied, spicy red wines.

== Grapes ==
The principle grapes of the Granja-Amareleja region include Manteudo, Moreto, Periquita, Rabo de Ovelha, Roupeiro, and Trincadeira.

== See also ==
- List of Portuguese wine regions
