= Pinhel wine =

Pinhel is a Portuguese wine region centered on the town of Pinhel in the wider Beiras wine region. Pinhel was initially a separate Indicação de Proveniencia Regulamentada (IPR) region, but in 2005, it became one of three subregions of the Beira Interior DOC, which has the higher Denominação de Origem Controlada (DOC) status. Its name may still be indicated together with that of Beira Interior, as Beira Interior-Pinhel.

Located south of the Douro region, Pinhel is known primarily for its earthy, full bodied white wines used by Portuguese sparkling wine producers as part of a base cuvée.

== Grapes ==
The principle grapes of the Pinhel region include Arinto, Assario Branco, Bastardo, Codo, Fonte Cal, Marufo, Rufete and Touriga Nacional.

== See also ==
- List of Portuguese wine regions
