= Borba wine =

Borba is a Portuguese wine region centered on the Borba Municipality in the Alentejo region. The region was initially an Indicação de Proveniencia Regulamentada (IPR) region, then elevated to Denominação de Origem Controlada (DOC) status. In 2003, it became one of eight subregions of the Alentejo DOC. Its name may still be indicated together with that of Alentejo, as Alentejo-Borba.

Borba is located south of the Portalegre subregion and north of the Redondo subregion. It was the first subregion of Alentejo to gain international attention for the quality of its wines.

== Grapes ==
The principal grapes of the Borba region includes Aragonez, Periquita, Perrum, Rabo de Ovelha, Roupeiro, Tamarez and Trincadeira.

Borba is also the name of a Spanish grape variety grown in Extremadura.

== See also ==
- List of Portuguese wine regions
