= History of Portuguese wine =

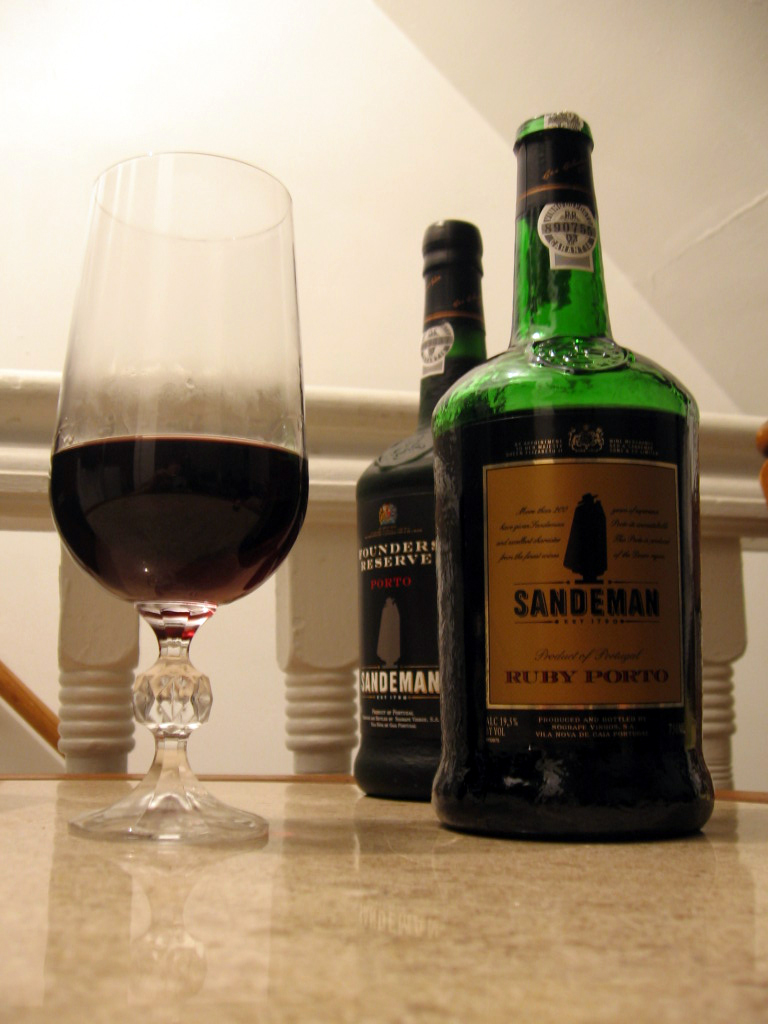
Port has been one of the most well known and successful wines in the history of Portuguese wine.

The history of Portuguese wine has been influenced by Portugal's relative isolationism in the world's wine market, with the one notable exception of its relationship with the British. Wine has been made in Portugal since at least 2000 BC when the Tartessians planted vines in the Southern Sado and Tagus valleys. By the 10th century BC, the Phoenicians had arrived and introduced new grape varieties and winemaking techniques to the area. Up until this point, viticulture was mostly centered on the southern coastal areas of Portugal. In later centuries, the Ancient Greeks, Celts and Romans would do much to spread viticulture and winemaking further north.

Portuguese wines were first shipped to England in the 12th century from the Entre Douro e Minho region (which today includes modern Portuguese wine regions such as the douro and vinho verde). In 1386, Portugal and England signed the Treaty of Windsor which fostered close diplomatic relations between the two countries and opened the door for extensive trade opportunities. Portuguese wine production increased fivefold between the late 17th century and early 18th century due to a boom in demand within Portugal, its overseas possessions, and Britain. The 1703 Methuen Treaty furthered advanced English economic interest in Portugal by reducing tariffs and giving Portuguese wines preferential treatment in the British wine market over French wines. Around this time, the fortified wine known as port was increasing in popularity in Britain. The lucrative trade in Port prompted the Portuguese authorities to establish one of the world's first protected designation of origin when Sebastião José de Carvalho e Melo, Marquis of Pombal established boundaries and regulations for the production of authentic Port from the Douro in 1756.

For centuries afterwards, Portuguese wines came to be associated with Port (and to some extent Madeira which was a popular drink of British colonies around the globe, such as the American colonies.) In the mid-to-late 20th century, sweet, slightly sparkling rosé brands from Portugal (Mateus and Lancers being the most notable) became immensely popular around the globe-with the British wine market again leading the way. In the mid-1980s, Portugal's introduction to the European Union brought a flood of financing and grants to the stagnant Portuguese wine industry. These new investments paved the way for upgrades in winemaking technology and facilities. Renewed interest in the abundance of unique Portuguese wine grape varieties shifted focus to more premium wine production with a portfolio of unique dry red and white wines being marketed on a global scale.

== Early history ==
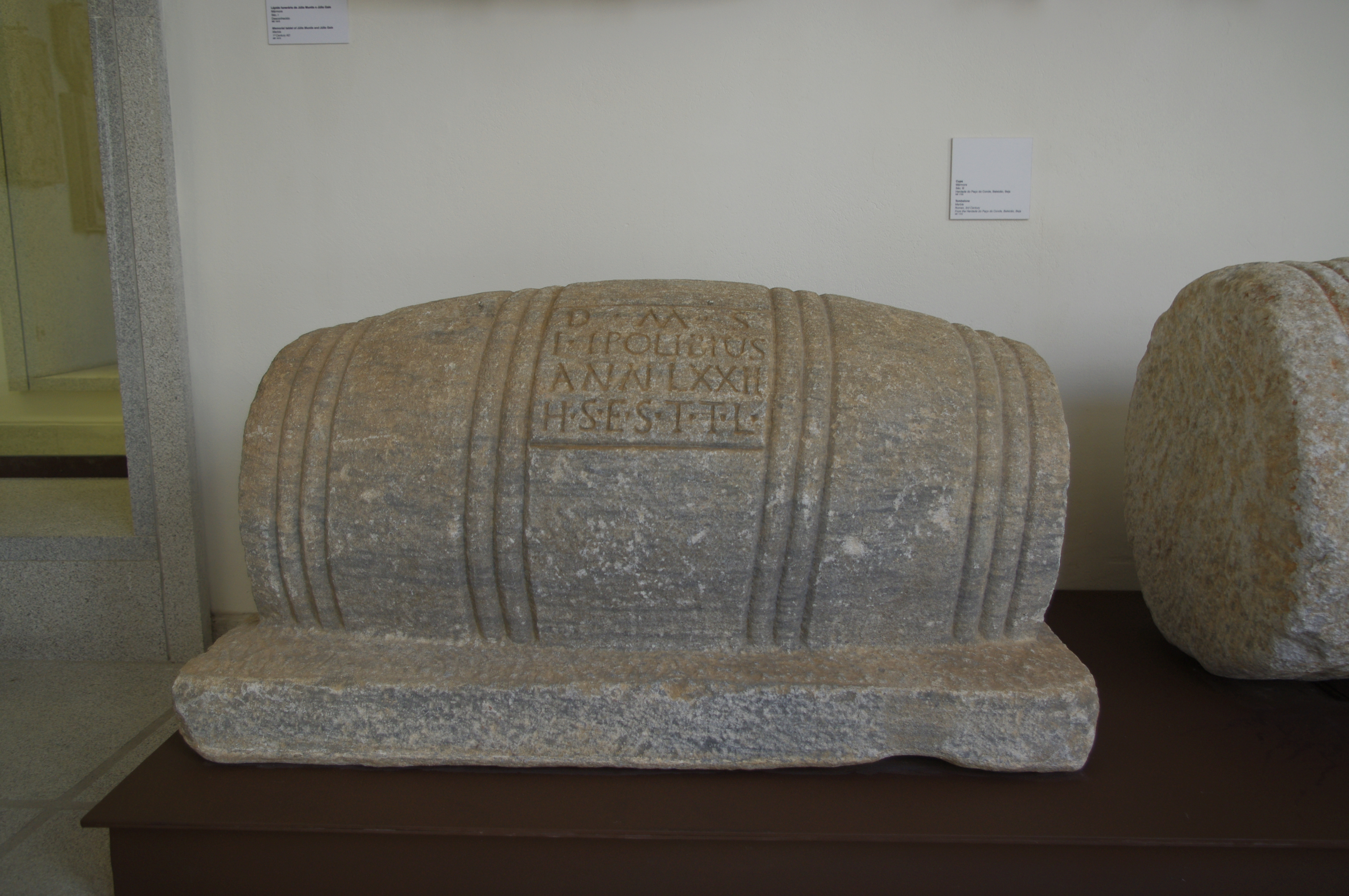
"cupa", Roman tombstones into the shape of a wooden wine barrels, were used to mark the grave wine makers in the 3rd century AD in Alentejo, a region already famous for its wines, Museu de Évora

Viticulture has existed on the Iberian Peninsula (home to modern day Spain and Portugal ) for thousands of years. The Tartessians are believed to have cultivated the first vineyards in the Tagus vineyards around 2000 BC. When the Phoenicians reached the area in the 10th century BC, they brought with them grape varieties and winemaking techniques from the Middle East and Carthage. The Ancient Greeks settlers of the 7th century BC, furthered the advance of viticulture in Southern Portugal and left evidence of their influence. In the area around the modern day town of Alcácer do Sal, archeologists have uncovered numerous pieces of cratera or Greek vases used to dilute wine with water with gives evidence of the Greeks drinking local Portuguese wine.

When the Romans reached Portugal, they named the area Lusitania after Lusus, the son of the Roman god of wine Bacchus. As they did before in Italy, France, Germany and Spain, the Romans did much to expand and promote viticulture in their settlements in Portugal. Wines were produced across the territory for both local consumption as well as export to Rome. Vineyards extended further north and inland, being firmly established in places such as Douro by the end of Roman rule. Following the Fall of the Roman Empire, local barbarian tribes sustained the tradition and practice of viticulture in the area. In the mid-9th century AD, Ordoño the Gothic king of Asturias (in what is now northern Spain) granted vineyards and landowning privileges around Coimbra to a monastic Christian order in the area. While most historian's accounts of the history of wine following Roman rules suggest that the Christian Church took the lead in preserving viticulture across the former Roman empire, the evidence suggest that, at least in Portugal, the ruling authorities played an important role.

== Relationship with England ==
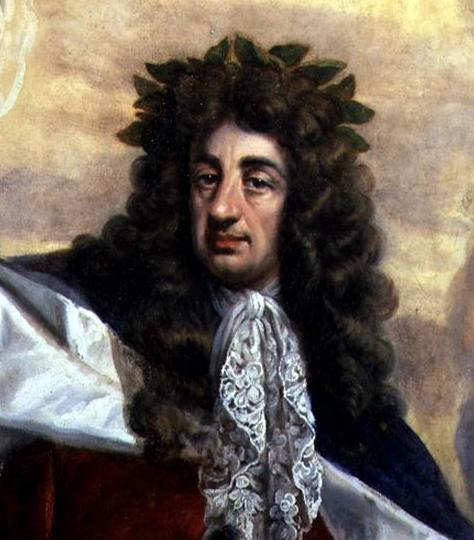
The fortunes of the Portuguese wine industry has been sharply influenced by the politics and conflicts of England such as when the English Parliament enacted an embargo on all French wine imports in order to limit the income of Charles II (pictured). Looking for an alternative source of wine, English wine merchants started importing vast amounts of Portuguese wine.

The climatic condition in England of a cool weather country has made the country unfavorable for viticulture, making the country a ready market for imported wines; its proximity to France, made French wines a natural source. At times the supply was threatened by political and military conflicts between the English and French crowns. New sources had to be found such as the wines of Portugal. Documents exist detailing Portuguese wine shipments from the Minho region to England occurring as early as the 12th century. These wines, including those from the wet northern region of modern-day Vinho Verde, were often light and astringent with noticeable acidity. Despite the new source, the variety of French wines (particularly those of Bordeaux) for English wine drinkers prevailed.

In 1386, the Portuguese and English signed the Treaty of Windsor. The pact of mutual support fostered a strong diplomatic alliance between the two countries (and was still valid and applicable as of 2009). Over the ensuing centuries, whenever England was in conflict with other European powers (most notably France), Portugal and its many vineyards were there to fill in the gap caused by the disruption of trade. Portuguese wine also served as a bargaining chip in English politics. In 1679, the English Parliament banned all imports of French wine as a means of limiting the tariff income of Charles II and forcing him to come to Parliament and ask them directly for funds. Charles and the English wine merchants turned again to Portugal, dramatically increasing imports of Portuguese wines from 427 tuns in 1678 to averaging over 14,000 tuns (roughly equivalent to 16 million liters or over 4 million US gallons) a year by 1685. However, it is very likely that not all these imported tuns were truly Portuguese wines, as some wine merchants found their way around the French wine embargo by shipping their wares in Portuguese wine barrels with forged documentation.

While the English wine market was lucrative, the relationship was essentially monopolistic with the vast majority of control in the hands of the English wine merchants. Portuguese growers and wine producers had little other avenues for trade with other countries and thus prices were largely dictated by the English. The 1703 Metheun Treaty further promoted English interest in Portuguese wines. The treaty established a system of preferential tariffs for Portuguese wine, at the expense of wines from other countries. It specifies that the tariffs for Portuguese wine should never be more than two-thirds that of which was levied on French wines. At the time, the levy on French wines was roughly equivalent to £20 a barrel with the levies on Portuguese wines dropping to around £7 a barrel. By 1717, Portuguese wines accounted for more than 66% of all wine imported into England, while French wines imports shrank to a mere 4%.

During this period, fortified Portuguese wines such as Port and Madeira were increasing in popularity in the English/British market. In the Atlantic, the Portuguese controlled island of Madeira was a vital trading stop to British colonies in the New World and beyond. The process of fortification was discovered to enhance the flavor and stability of wines on these long sea voyages. Madeira wine became particularly popular in the American colonies, with an established market that continued to thrive even after the colonies gained independence from Great Britain.

=== The rise of Port ===
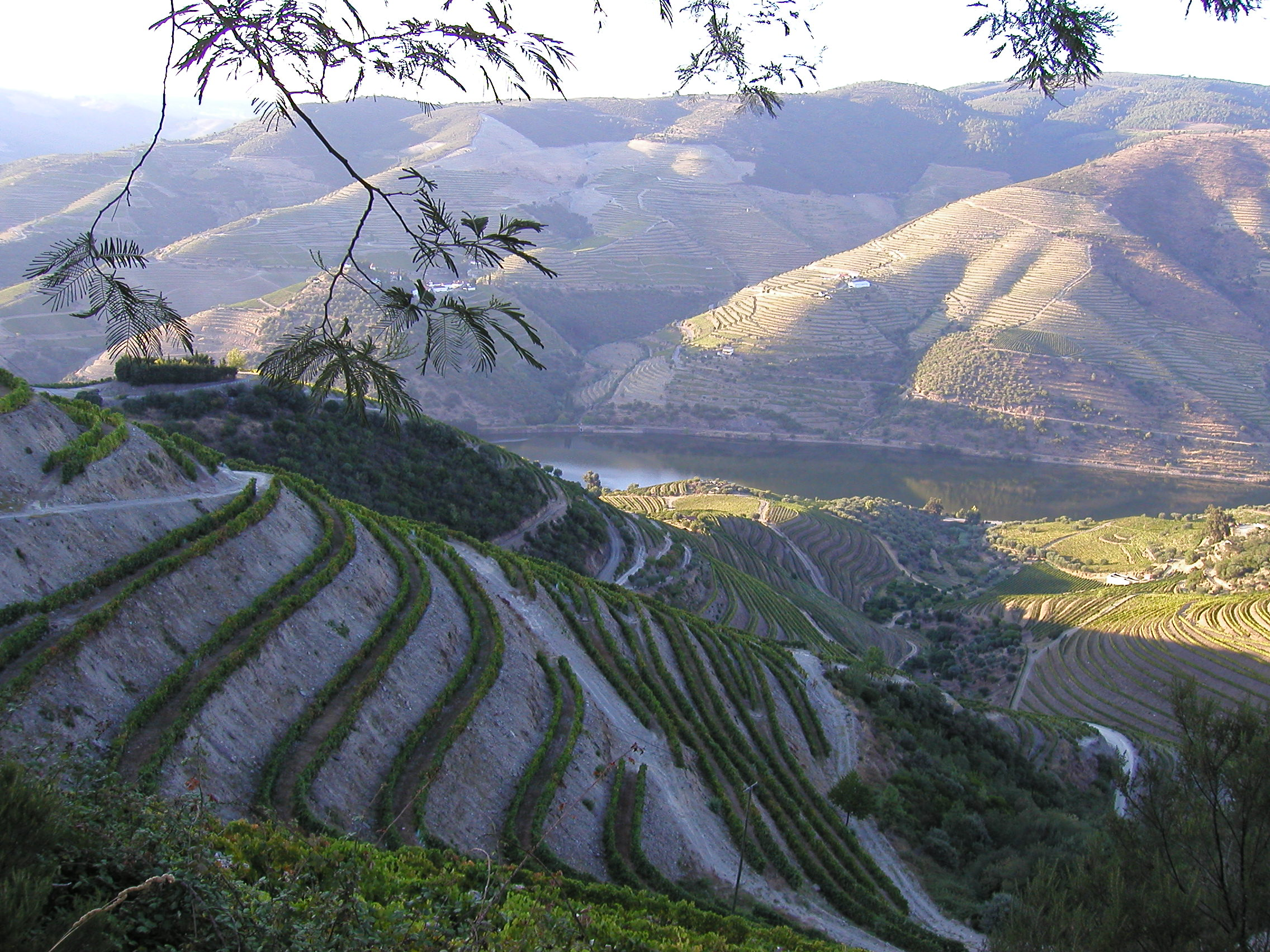
In the 17th century, the English discovered a new style of wine from among the steep vineyards of the Douro Valley.

Of all the wines most closely associated with Portugal, and most reflective of the immense influence that the British have had on the Portuguese wine industry, it is Port. So close is the relationship that wine writer Karen MacNeil notes "If Portugal is the mother of Port, Britain is certainly its father". While there are many theories as to the origin of the fortified wine known as Port, one of the most prevalent is that of the 1678 visit by English wine merchants to a monastery in the Portuguese town of Lamego located along the Douro river. In search of new wines to ship back to England, the merchants came across an abbot in Lamego who was producing a style of wine that the merchants had never encountered before. While fortification of wine had been known for centuries, the fortifying grape spirit was usually added after fermentation, when the wine was already fermented dry. The abbot of Lamego was fortifying his wine during fermentation, which had the effect of killing off the active yeast cells and leaving the wine with high levels of residual sugar. This method produced a very strong, alcoholic wine with noticeable levels of sweetness that was very successful in the English wine market.

In 1693, amidst another conflict with the French, King William III of England imposed punitive levels of taxation on French wine imports. This very high level of taxation, drove even more English wine merchants to the Douro. The popularity of Port, or "blackstrap" as it was sometimes known because of its dark color and astringency, continued to increase when the War of the Spanish Succession essentially severed all trade in French wine among the English. With that rising popularity also came an increase in wine fraud and adulteration. Less than scrupulous producers were adding sugar and elderberry juice to the wine to increase alcohol content and enhance color more cheaply. Various spices such as black pepper, cinnamon and ginger were added to give the wine additional flavors. Grapes grown in other regions of Portugal and even Spain were trucked into Porto and Vila Nova de Gaia to be misrepresented as authentic Port from the Douro. As news of the scandal spread, sales and imports of Port wine in England dropped dramatically. Imports dropped from a high 116,000 hectoliters (over 3 million US gallons) in 1728 to 54,900 hectoliters (around 1.45 million US gallons) in 1756. Worse still for the Port producers was the precipitous drop in pricing.

==== After the scandal ====
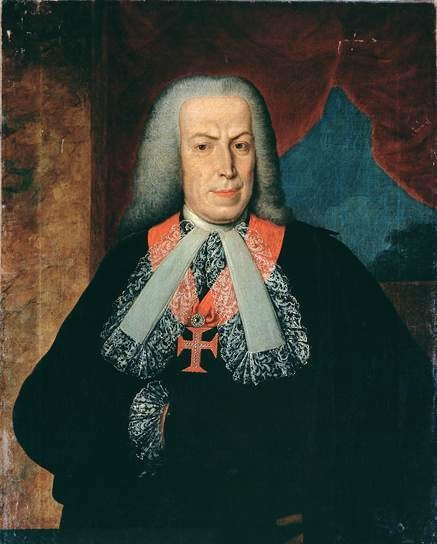
In 1756, the Marquis of Pombal (pictured) established the declaration that delineated the Douro wine region, making it one of the world's oldest established appellation.

The economic turmoil as well as growing complaints and dissatisfaction over the business dealings of the British caused the Marquis of Pombal, in 1756, to create the Douro Wine Company to regulate the Port wine trade. One of the company's first regulations was the delineation of the Douro wine region as the only sanction area that could produce wine labeled and sold as "Port". This 1756 declaration made the Douro region, one of the world's oldest established appellations. The aim of the organization was to supervise the production of Port in all stages of winemaking from harvesting to winemaking to aging and finally shipping. In addition to their supervisory role, the organization also sought to remove the temptation for fraud by ordering that all elderberry plants in the Douro be ripped out.

The efforts of the Portuguese government and the General Company helped restore the Port market and sales quickly rebounded. In 1799, 44 million liters (over 11.6 million US gallons) of port were imported by the English-an equivalent of five liters for every man, woman and child in England. During this period, Port became associated with the "Englishman's drink" with social clubs touting membership of "three-bottle men" or those who were able to drink at least three bottles of Port in one sitting. Among the notable men who touted this accomplishment were William Pitt the Younger and the playwright Richard Brinsley Sheridan.

So intimately tied was port to the English that during the Napoleonic Wars, French and Spanish troops invaded Northern Portugal and Douro in an attempt to hurt British trade interest. While the vineyards themselves sustained little damage, the two French invasions of the Douro between 1807 and 1809 had a damaging economic effect on the Douro wine growers. The British merchants of Porto fled before the French arrival which sealed off that valuable export market. While the foreign troops themselves provided some local market, more often than not cellars were raided rather than actually purchased. In 1808, a group of Portuguese soldiers and growers staged a series of guerrilla attacks in the Douro. Hiding among the high, terraced vineyards of the Douro, the Portuguese would fire upon and attack the French soldiers stationed along the roads bordering the river below. By 1809, the French invasions ended but British Port sales were slow to return. Despite the British population boom of the mid-19th century, sales of Port was mostly leveled with the totals of the previous century. The likely cause was the diversification of British tastes which started to include the popularity of teas, coffees, beers, chocolates and other fortified wines such as sherry from Spain.

== Markets in the New World ==
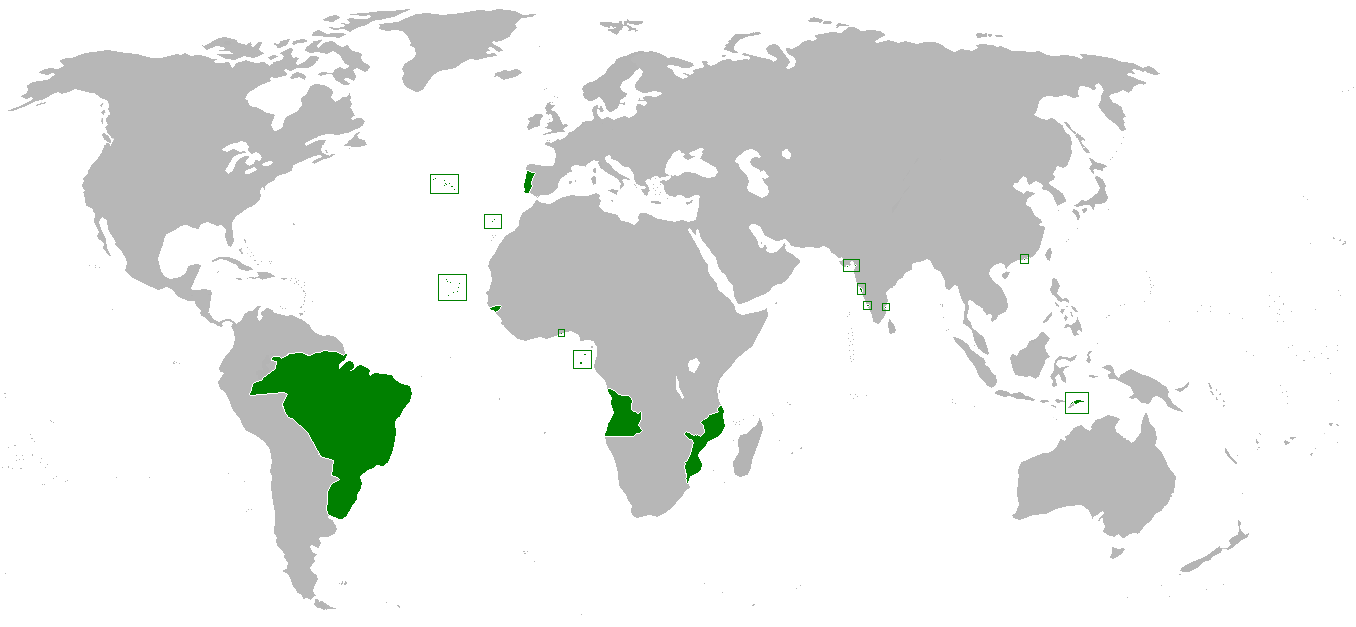
As the British wine market leveled, Portuguese wine producers looked to their colonies (particularly Brazil) for wine sales.

As the British market waned, Portuguese wine producers turned their attention the Portuguese colonies of West Africa and South America. Wanting to protect their own interest, the Portuguese developed monopolistic policies that practically forbade their colonies from importing wines from other countries or trying to produce wine of their own. In Brazil, the wealthy market of Rio de Janeiro was given exclusively to the Douro producers at the expense of other Portuguese wine regions. The monopoly of control allowed Portuguese wine merchants to set excessively high prices on their wines, often five times the price that the wines would fetch in Britain or Portugal. Dissatisfaction over restrictions such as these contributed to the growing movement for Brazilian Declaration of Independence which was eventually achieved on 7 September 1822. With the loss of the Brazilian market and the limited markets in West Africa, Portuguese wine producers retreated further into their relative isolationism when it came to the wine market. While Britain still remained a strong market, the Portuguese wine industry entered a period of stagnation that was further punctuated by the devastation of the phylloxera louse.

== Phylloxera epidemic to the mid-20th century ==
In the late 19th century the phylloxera epidemic that devastated vineyards across Europe reached Portugal with similar devastation. Only the Ramisco vines planted in the sandy terrain of Colares escaped the destructive louse. Many wine regions, especially those in the south, never recovered and shifted their attention to other agricultural endeavors. Among the industries that took root was the raising and harvesting of cork material, with Portugal today being the world's biggest producer. Those who did replant, turned their attention to high-yielding varieties and French hybrids. The quality of wine produced from these grapes were relatively low and, outside the steady market for Port, the Portuguese wine industry faded out of the public attention.

The early 20th century brought a period of much political and domestic instability in Portugal, continuing until the ascension of António de Oliveira Salazar as dictator of the Estado Novo or Second Republic of Portugal. During Salazar's 40-year reign, the entire Portuguese wine industry was revamped beginning with the founding of the Junta Nacional do Vinhos (JNV) in 1937. The JNV encouraged the consolidation of small vineyard landowners into co-operative wine producers. While the rise of co-operatives brought more order and structure to the Portuguese wine industry, it also had the negative effect of curbing creativity and free enterprise. As co-operatives rose to nearly absolute power in several wine regions, the winemaking and hygiene standards of some of the more lax co-operatives declined, which cast a pale reputation on the whole of the Portuguese wine industry. The lone bright spot during this period was the international success of a style of mass-produced, sweet, slightly sparkling rosés that came out of Portugal. Following World War II, brands such as Mateus and Lancer marketed this style of wine to great success in British supermarkets and around the globe. Outside port, these wines also came to be readily associated with Portuguese wine.

== To the modern day ==
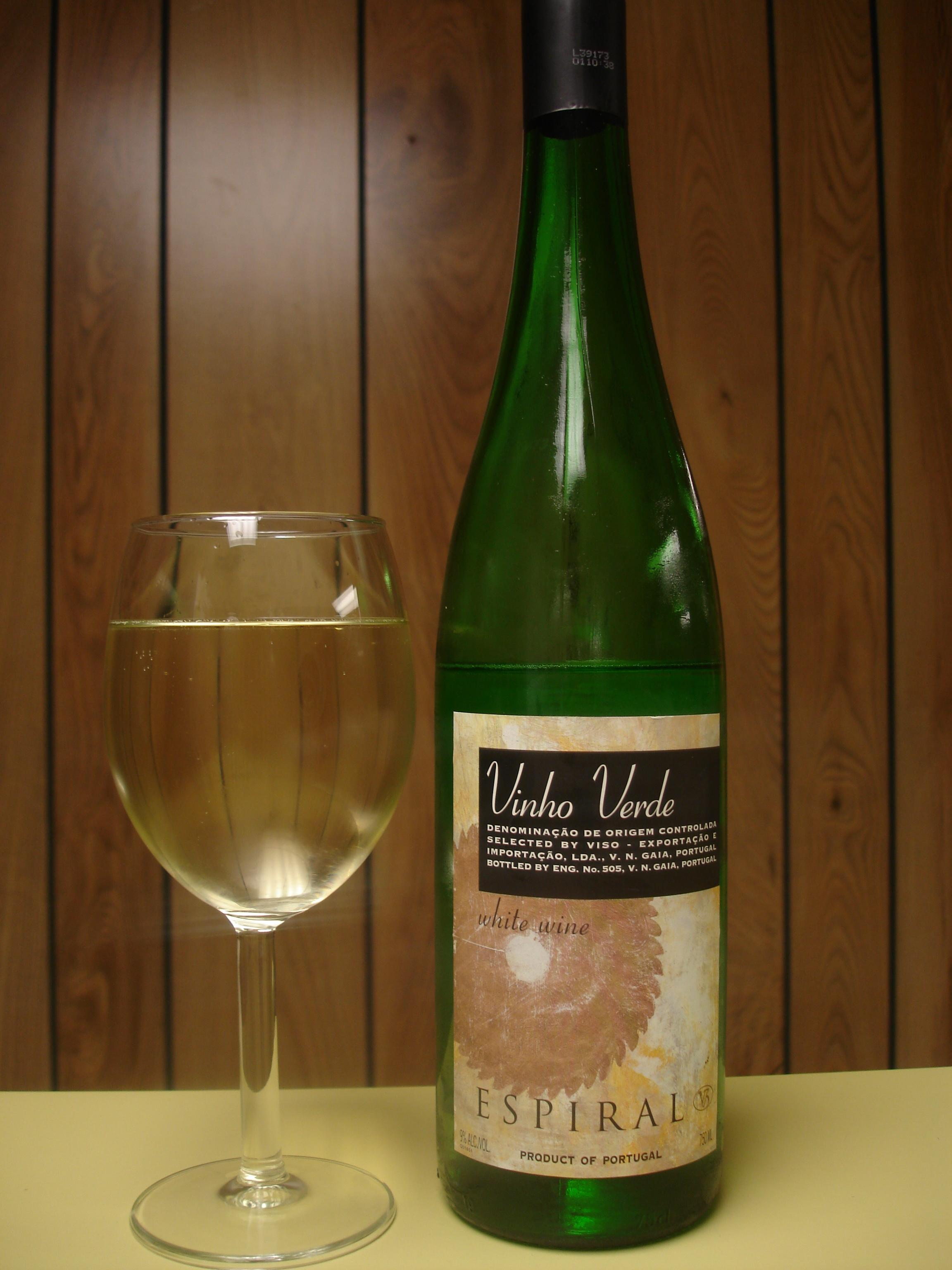
Today, Portugal is known for more than just Port and Madeira with wines such as Vinho Verde (pictured) gaining international attention.

The late 20th century saw another period of domestic upheaval with the military coup known as the Carnation Revolution. Eventually military rule gave way to Portugal's transition to democracy which led to Portugal's entry into the European Union in 1986. Admission into the EU has had an immense impact on the Portuguese wine industry. In order to comply with EU standards, many of the country's monopolistic legislation that unfairly benefited co-operatives were overturned. Smaller growers and wine producers received millions of dollars of subsidies and grants from the EU to improve their vineyards and winemaking facilities. The stability brought by democracy and the European Union also encouraged more foreign investments, which brought expansions and upgrades of winemaking technology and know how to Portugal. The Portuguese appellation system of Denominação de Origem Controlada (DOC) was also upgraded to be more in line with its French, Italian and Spanish counterparts.

The rise of smaller boutique wineries or quintas has brought about a revolution in Portuguese wine making. Prior to this, non-fortified Portuguese wines were characterized as being "rustic" and "oxidized". Advancements in better winemaking techniques have allowed producers to make cleaner, softer wines that are more palatable to the international wine market. While historically the Portuguese wine industry was seemingly split into two: the producers who made Port and those who made everything else, the distinction between the two sides of the industry is now blurred. Many Port producers are now making premium dry wines from grapes grown in the Douro and producers in other areas of Portugal have been experimenting with making fortified wine in the style of Port (though it can not legally be called Port). In recent times, producers have been focusing more experimenting with the abundance of unique Portuguese grape varieties as well as international varieties. Wines from Portuguese regions such as Dão, Vinho Verde and Alentejo have been exported around the globe and garnered attention from wine critics.

== See also ==
- Factory House
