= Chaves wine =

Portuguese wine region in the town of Chaves

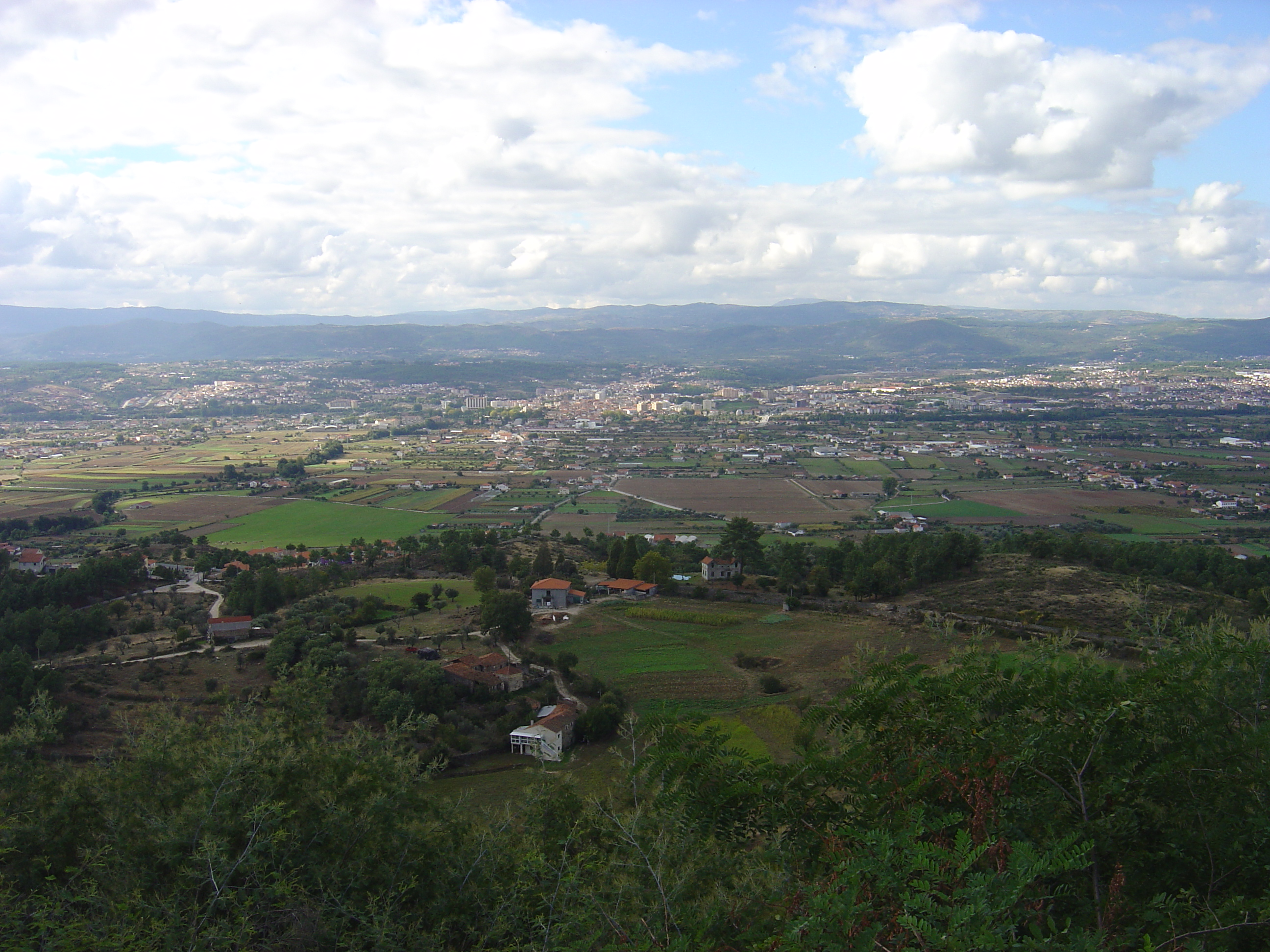
Chaves

Chaves is a Portuguese wine region centered on the town of Chaves in the Trás-os-Montes e Alto Douro region. The region was initially a separate Indicação de Proveniencia Regulamentada (IPR) region, but in 2006, it became one of three subregions of the Trás-os-Montes DOC, which has the higher Denominação de Origem Controlada (DOC) status. Its name may still be indicated together with that of Trás-os-Montes, as Trás-os-Montes-Chaves.

Located along the Tamega river, the region produces light bodied wines that are similar in style to wines produces in the Douro DOC.

== Grapes ==
The main grapes of the Chaves region include Bastardo, Boal, Codega, Gouveio, Malvasia Fina, Tinta Carvalha and Tinta Amarela.

== See also ==
- List of Portuguese wine regions
