= Redondo, Portugal =

Redondo
- Municipality
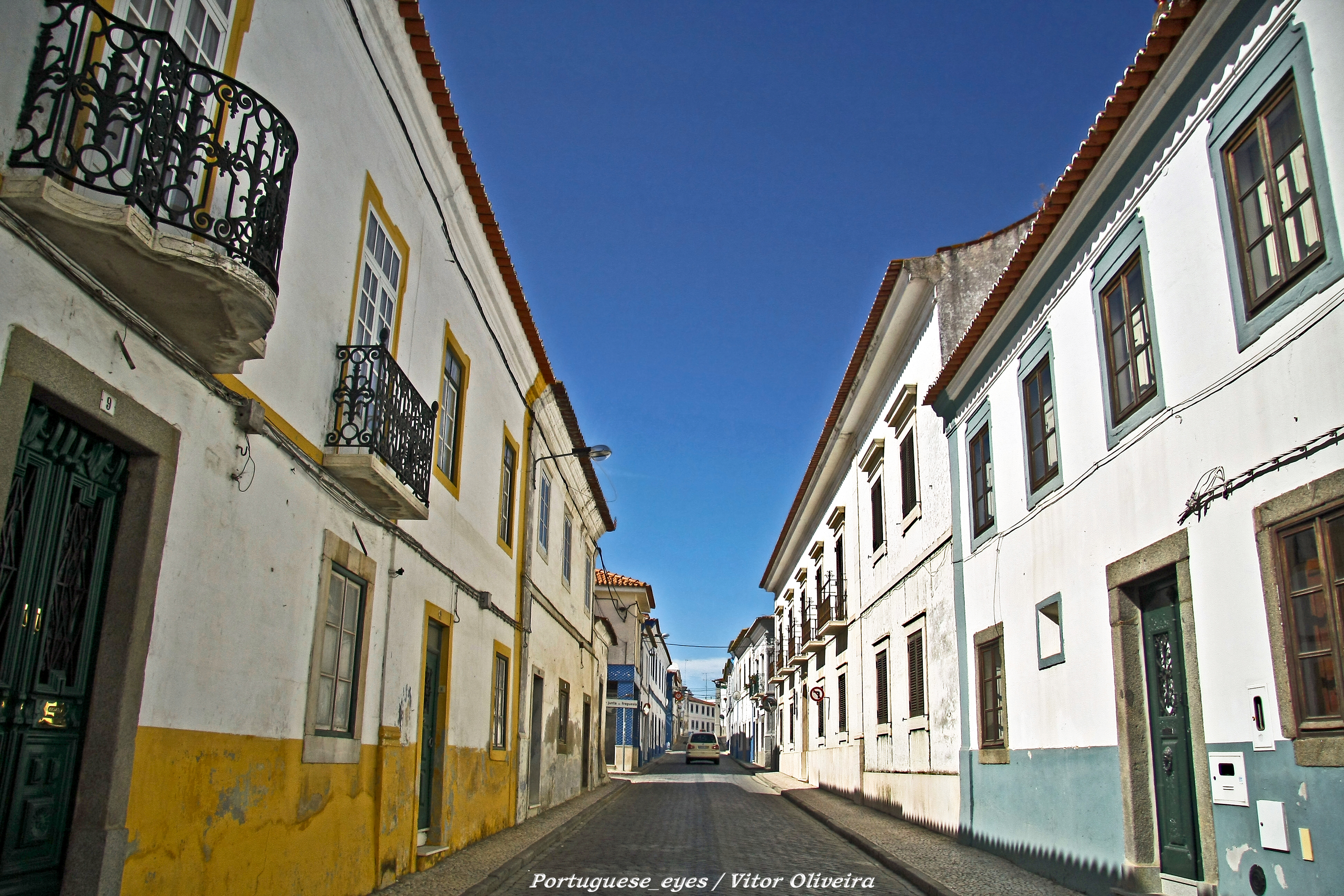

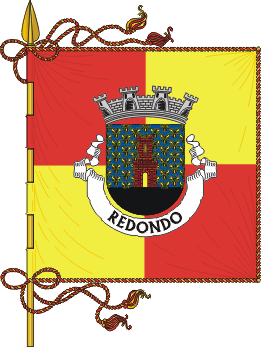
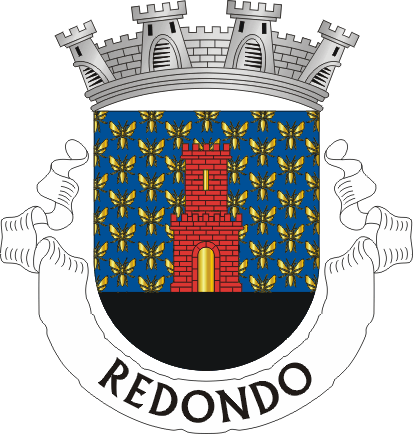
- Flag Coat of arms
- Interactive map of Redondo
- Coordinates: 38°38′N 7°32′W
- Country: Portugal
- Region: Alentejo
- Intermunic. comm.: Alentejo Central
- District: Évora
- Parishes: 2

Government
  - President: David Galego (PSD/CDS)

Area
  - Total: 369.51 km^{2} (142.67 sq mi)

Population (2025)
  - Total: 6,431
  - Density: 17.40/km^{2} (45.08/sq mi)
- Time zone: UTC+00:00 (WET)
  - Summer (DST): UTC+01:00 (WEST)
- Local holiday: Easter Monday date varies
- Website: www.cm-redondo.pt

Redondo (European Portuguese pronunciation: [rɨˈðõdu]) is a municipality in the District of Évora in Portugal. The population in 2025 was 6,431, in an area of 369.51 square kilometres (142.67 mi^{2}).

== Etymology ==
"Redondo" is a Portuguese word that translates to "round" in English. According to legend, the town of Redondo may be named after a round boulder that existed in its primitive medieval wall.

== History ==
The territory of the modern municipality of Redondo has been inhabited since pre-historic times. It features several megaliths and a fortified settlement at the São Pedro hilltop dating back to the 3rd millennium BC. This human presence continued through the Roman period in Iberia, due to its proximity to the city of Évora.

Redondo was given a foral (royal charter) in 1318 by King Dinis, which was later revised in 1517 by King Manuel I. In 1500, the town was granted to captain Vasco Coutinho, the 1st Count of Redondo.

At the start of the 14th century, the town of Redondo hosted a small population, leading to João I to impose an obligation for those travelling from Évora to Vila Viçosa and Alandroal to pass through Redondo. However, by 1463, inhabitants had fully utilized the area within castle walls and inhabitants started occupying areas outside of the wall. That same year, inhabitants of this new area of the town were given the same rights as those living inside castle walls.

The town's expansion accelerated during the 17th and 18th centuries, supported by higher textile manufacturing. This period was also marked by the rehousing of the town hall from Castelo street to its present day location. However, during the first half of the 19th century, growth began to slow down. The town expanded again in the late 19th and early 20th centuries, driven by increased viticulture and pottery production.

== Geography ==
Redondo is located in Évora District in southern Portugal, within the Alentejo region. The town of Redondo is located 35 kilometres (22 mi) east of the city of Évora. The municipality occupies an area of 369.51 square kilometres (142.67 mi^{2}) and it is bordered by the municipalities of Estremoz and Borba to the north, Vila Viçosa and Alandroal to the east, Reguengos de Monsaraz to the southeast and Évora to the west.

Redondo has a mediterranean climate, with precipitation oscillating between 500 millimetres (20 in) during the fall and winter and just 170 millimetres (6.7 in) during the rest of the year. The municipality contains hilly terrain, such as the Serra de Ossa in the north at around 650 metres (2,130 ft) and the peaks of Bamburra and Carrascal. The municipality is also home to some water streams, such as Calado, Silveirinha, Freixo and Alcorovisca.

== Culture ==
Major cultural events include the Ruas Floridas street festival, held every two years in August, during which the streets are transformed by large floral displays. Literary and poetic events include the Prémio Literário Hernâni Cidade Literary Prize and the Palavras ao Vento literary festival.

The extensive viticulture and vinicultural heritage of the area, protected as part of the Alentejo DOC, is celebrated in an annual series of cultural events and wine tastings, such as Wine Land and Wine Sunset. Noted producers in the area include the Adega de Redondo co-operative winery and Courelas da Torre organic winery. In 2025, Redondo linked with its wine-producing neighbours of Alandroal, Borba, Estremoz, and Vila Viçosa, all clustered around the Serra d'Ossa hill range, and they were awarded, under the collective title of Vinhos de Serra d'Ossa (Wines of Serra d'Ossa), with the prestigious Cidade do Vinho (City of Wine) status for 2025 by the Associação de Municípios Portugueses do Vinho.

Redondo is also known for its ceramics (olarias), producing traditionally hand-painted items decorated with local agricultural themes. The more widely known potteries include Olaria Pirraça and Olaria Xico Tarefa.

== Administration ==
The current mayor is David Manuel Fialho Galego, having been elected in 2022. The municipal holiday is Easter Monday.

=== Parishes ===
Administratively, the municipality is divided into 2 civil parishes (freguesias):

- Montoito
- Redondo

== Notable people ==
- Hernâni Cidade (born 1887, died 1975), a Portuguese professor, essayist, historian, and First World War veteran who was a noted scholar of classical Portuguese literature and literary critic. The local school in Redondo and a literary prize are named in his honour.
- Bruno Pires (born 1981), a Portuguese former professional road bicycle racer, who competed professionally between 2002 and 2016
- Vitorino (born 1942), a Portuguese singer-songwriter known for his work combining the music of his native Alentejo with urban popular song

== See also ==
- Redondo DOC
- Alentejo DOC
