= List of Portuguese wine regions =

Geographical Denominations of Wine Producing Regions in Portugal

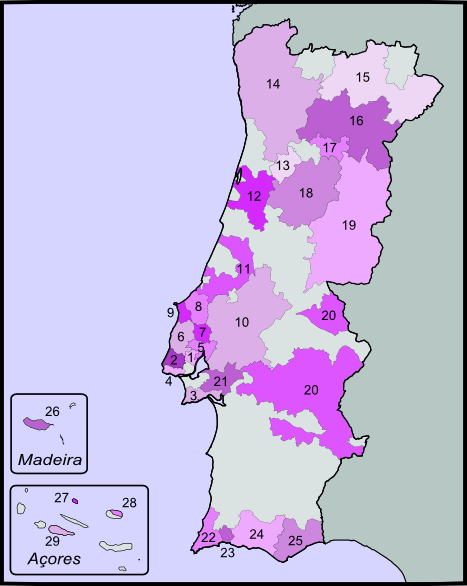
Map of the DOCs and IPRs of Portugal. 1. Bucelas DOC, 2. Colares DOC, 3. Setúbal DOC, 4. Carcavelos DOC, 5. Alenquer DOC, 6. Torres Vedras DOC, 7. Arruda DOC, 8. Óbidos DOC, 9. Lourinhã DOC (produces brandy typically called aguardente), 10. Ribatejo DOC, 11. Encostas d'Aire DOC, 12. Bairrada DOC, 13. Lafões IPR, 14. Vinho Verde DOC, 15. Trás-os-Montes DOC, 16. Porto DOC & Douro DOC, 17. Távora-Varosa DOC, 18. Dão DOC, 19. Beira Interior DOC, 20. Alentejo DOC, 21. Palmela DOC, 22. Lagos DOC, 23. Portimão DOC, 24. Lagoa DOC, 25. Tavira DOC, 26. Madeira DOC & Madeirense DOC, 27. Graciosa IPR, 28. Biscoitos IPR, 29. Pico IPR

Portuguese wine regions are grouped into three levels of classification. At the top are the Denominação de Origem Controlada (or DOCs) which are Quality Wines Produced in Specified Regions (QWpsr) under the European Union wine regulations and thus correspond roughly to the French Appellation d'origine contrôlée (AOC) and Spanish Denominación de Origen (DO) classifications. The second group consist of Indicação de Proveniência Regulamentada (IPRs), and are also QWpsr. IPRs are used for DOC candidates "in training", and this level roughly corresponds to the French vin délimité de qualité supérieure (VDQS) system. The final group are the Vinho Regional (VRs), which are table wines with a geographical indication under EU regulations. VRs each cover a larger area and are similar to the French Vin de pays at regional/departmental level.

The early 2000s has seen many changes in the classification and naming of Portuguese wine regions. Many previous IPRs have been elevated to DOC status, either on their own or to create a new, larger DOC from either IPRs or a mixture or smaller DOCs and IPRs. At the same time, the name of some VRs have been modified to allow them to be differentiated from some newly created DOCs which have taken over names of former VRs.

As of 2009, there were 26 DOCs for wine (not counting special designations and subregions), 4 IPRs and 11 VRs.

== Denominação de Origem Controlada ==
- Alenquer DOC
- Alentejo DOC, with the eight subregions Borba, Évora, Granja-Amareleja, Moura, Portalegre, Redondo, Reguengos, and Vidigueira.
- Arruda DOC
- Bairrada DOC
- Beira Interior DOC, with the three subregions Castelo Rodrigo, Cova da Beira, and Pinhel.
- Bucelas DOC
- Carcavelos DOC
- Colares DOC
- Dão DOC, with the seven subregions Alva, Besteiros, Castendo, Serra da Estrela, Silgueiros, Terras de Azurara, and Terras de Senhorim, and the special designation Dão Nobre.
- Douro DOC, with the three subregions Baixo Corgo, Cima Corgo, and Douro Superior, and the special designation Moscatel do Douro.
- Encostas d'Aire DOC, with the two subregions Alcobaça and Ourém.
- Lagoa DOC
- Lagos DOC
- Madeira DOC
- Madeirense DOC
- Óbidos DOC
- Palmela DOC
- Porto DOC
- Portimão DOC
- Tejo DOC, with the six subregions Almeirim, Cartaxo, Chamusca, Coruche, Santarém, and Tomar. (until 2009 known as Ribatejo DOC)
- Setúbal DOC with the special designations Moscatel de Setúbal and Setúbal Roxo.
- Tavira DOC
- Távora-Varosa DOC
- Torres Vedras DOC
- Trás-os-Montes DOC, with the three subregions Chaves, Planalto Mirandês, and Valpaços.
- Vinho Verde DOC, with the nine subregions Amarante, Ave, Baião, Basto, Cávado, Lima, Monção e Melgaço, Paiva, and Sousa, and the two special designations Vinho Verde Alvarinho and Vinho Verde Alvarinho Espumante.

=== Former DOCs ===
Some former separate DOCs have been absorbed into larger DOCs:

- Borba DOC, a subregion within Alentejo DOC since 2003.
- Portalegre DOC, a subregion within Alentejo DOC since 2003.
- Redondo DOC, a subregion within Alentejo DOC since 2003.
- Reguengos DOC, a subregion within Alentejo DOC since 2003.
- Vidigueira DOC, a subregion within Alentejo DOC since 2003.

== Indicação de Proveniência Regulamentada ==
- Biscoitos IPR
- Graciosa IPR
- Lafões IPR
- Pico IPR

=== Former IPRs ===
While many former IPRs have been elevated to DOC status under the same name, some have instead been absorbed into larger DOCs:

- Alcobaça IPR, a subregion within Encostas d'Aire DOC since 2005.
- Almeirim IPR, a subregion within Ribatejo DOC since 2003.
- Arrábida IPR, now a part of Palmela DOC.
- Cartaxo IPR, a subregion within Ribatejo DOC since 2003.
- Castelo Rodrigo IPR, a subregion within Beira Interior DOC since 2005.
- Chamusca IPR, a subregion within Ribatejo DOC since 2003.
- Chaves IPR, a subregion within Trás-os-Montes DOC since 2006.
- Coruche IPR, a subregion within Ribatejo DOC since 2003.
- Cova da Beira IPR, a subregion within Beira Interior DOC since 2005.
- Encostas da Nave IPR, now a part of Távora-Varosa DOC.
- Évora IPR, a subregion within Alentejo DOC since 2003.
- Granja-Amareleja IPR, a subregion within Alentejo DOC since 2003.
- Moura IPR, a subregion within Alentejo DOC since 2003.
- Pinhel IPR, a subregion within Beira Interior DOC since 2005.
- Planalto Mirandês IPR, a subregion within Trás-os-Montes DOC since 2006.
- Santarém IPR, a subregion within Ribatejo DOC since 2003.
- Tomar IPR, a subregion within Ribatejo DOC since 2003.
- Valpaços IPR, a subregion within Trás-os-Montes DOC since 2006.
- Varosa IPR, now a part of Távora-Varosa DOC.

== Vinhos Regionais ==
- Açores VR
- Alentejano VR
- Algarve VR
- Beiras VR
- Duriense VR
- Lisboa VR (until 2009 known as Estremadura VR)
- Minho VR (previously Rios do Minho VR)
- Tejo VR (until 2009 known as Ribatejo VR)
- Península de Setúbal VR (until 2009 known as Terras do Sado VR)
- Terras Madeirenses VR
- Transmontano VR (previously Trás-os-Montes VR)

== See also ==
- History of Portuguese wine
