= Cova da Beira =

Cova da Beira may refer to:

== Places ==
=== Portugal ===
- Cova da Beira Subregion, NUTS 3 region of Portugal
- Cova da Beira IPR, wine region in Portugal
