= Lafões IPR =

Coordinates: 40.7925394°N 8.034938°W

Lafões is a Portuguese wine region, near Viseu, overlapping into the Dão and Vinho Verde DOCs. The region has the second tier Indicação de Proveniencia Regulamentada (IPR) classification and may some day be promoted to Denominação de Origem Controlada (DOC). The region is known for its acidic, light bodied, red and white wines.

== Grapes ==
The principle grapes of the region include Amaral, Arinto, Cerceal and Jaen.

== See also ==
- List of Portuguese wine regions
