= Muscatel =

Wine made from muscat grapes

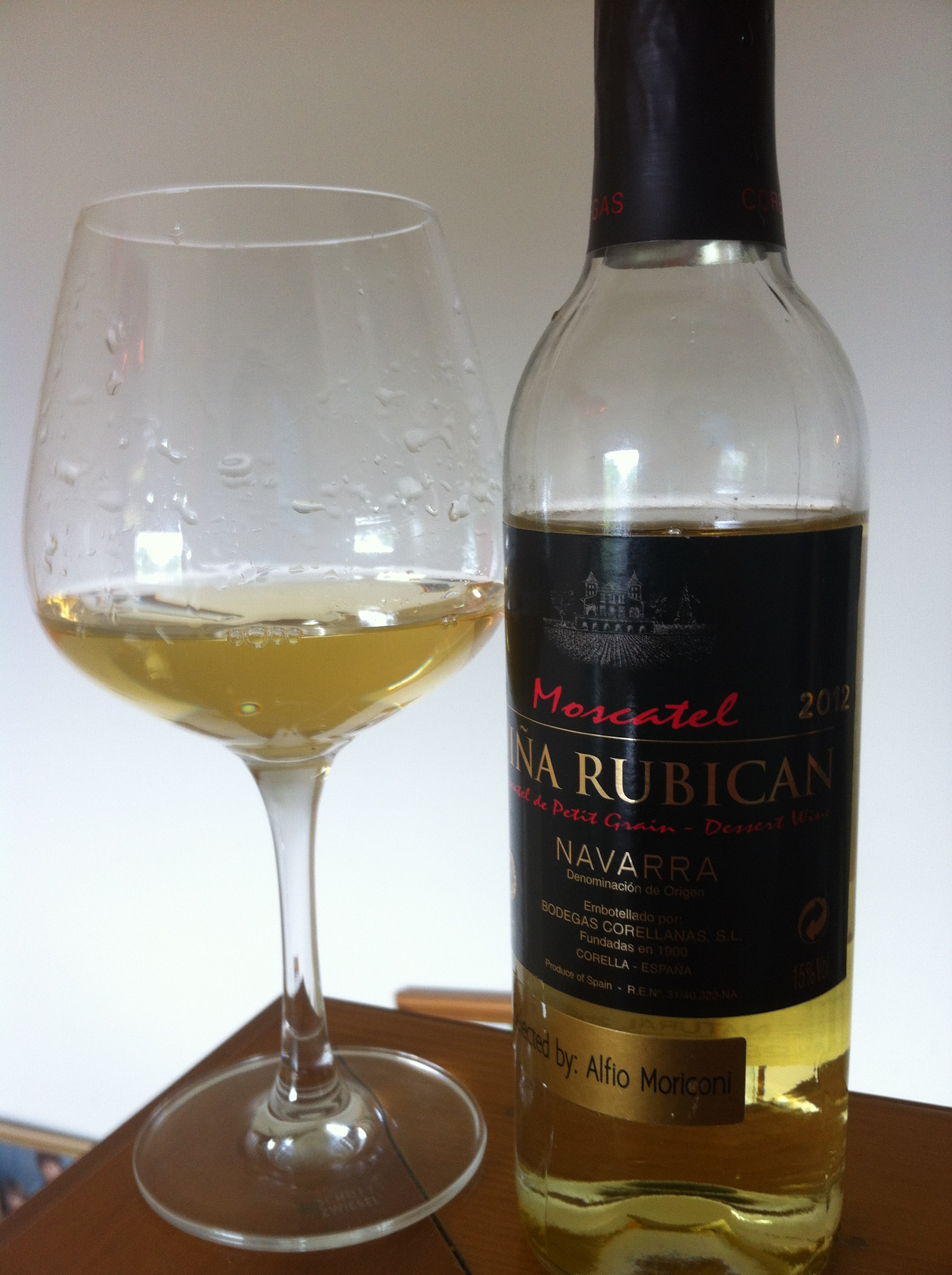
Fortified Spanish wine from the Navarre region made from Muscat blanc a Petits Grains

Muscatel (/ˌmʌskəˈtɛl/ MUSK-ə-TEL) is a term used for wines made from grapes of the Muscat family. The Muskat family comprises numerous grape variations grown internationally and is associated with a range of wine styles. In modern wine usage, "Muscat" is the family name, while related terms such as "Moscato" (Italian) and "Moscatel" (Iberian) are used in regional naming traditions. Outside the United States, "muscatel" (sometimes spelled "moscatel") is a general term referring to wines made from Muscat grapes in styles including still, sparkling, dry, sweet, and fortified wines.

== Usage ==
=== United States usage ===
In the United States, the term "muscatel" normally refers only to inexpensive fortified wine made from grapes. Fortified muscatel became popular in the United States at the end of Prohibition, when, in order to meet the sudden surge in demand for wine, some inferior strains of muscat grapes (normally sold as table grapes or made into raisins) were mixed with sugar and cheap brandy to produce what came to be pejoratively referred to as "wino wine." As a result, the label "muscatel" became associated in the U.S. with inferior-quality wine, so that today in that country, fine wines made from superior strains of muscat grapes tend not to be called "muscatel." However, outside the U.S., "muscatel" (sometimes spelled "moscatel") refers to the full range of wines made with muscat grapes.

International usage

In international wine terminology, related terms such as Muscat, Moscatel, and Moscato are applied to a broad range of wines made from Muscat-family grapes.In Spain, Moscatel is associated with sweet wines from Málaga, Alicante, and Valencia. In Portugal, Moscatel is associated with Moscatel de Setúbal, a traditional fortified wine from the Península de Setúbal.

Historical usage in Germany

In 16th-century Germany, "muscatel" was also the term for Rhine wines to which elderflower-infused Salvia sclarea had been added to make a more potent beverage. The varietal of the plant used in this concoction thus acquired the common name, "muscatel sage".

== Protected geographical indications ==
In Portugal, the designation Setúbal is reserved for Moscatel de Setúbal and Moscatel Roxo wines from the Península de Setúbal.

== See also ==
- Moscatel de Setúbal
