= Beira Interior DOC =

Beira Interior is a Portuguese wine Denominação de Origem Controlada (DOC) located in central Portugal in the Beiras VR wine region. It was created in 2005 when three Indicação de Proveniencia Regulamentada (IPR) regions were put together into one DOC.

== Subregions ==
Beira Interior has three subregions, which may be indicated on wine labels together with the name Beira Interior. The subregions, which correspond to the former IPRs, are:

- Castelo Rodrigo
- Cova da Beira
- Pinhel
