= Borba, Portugal =

Borba
- Municipality
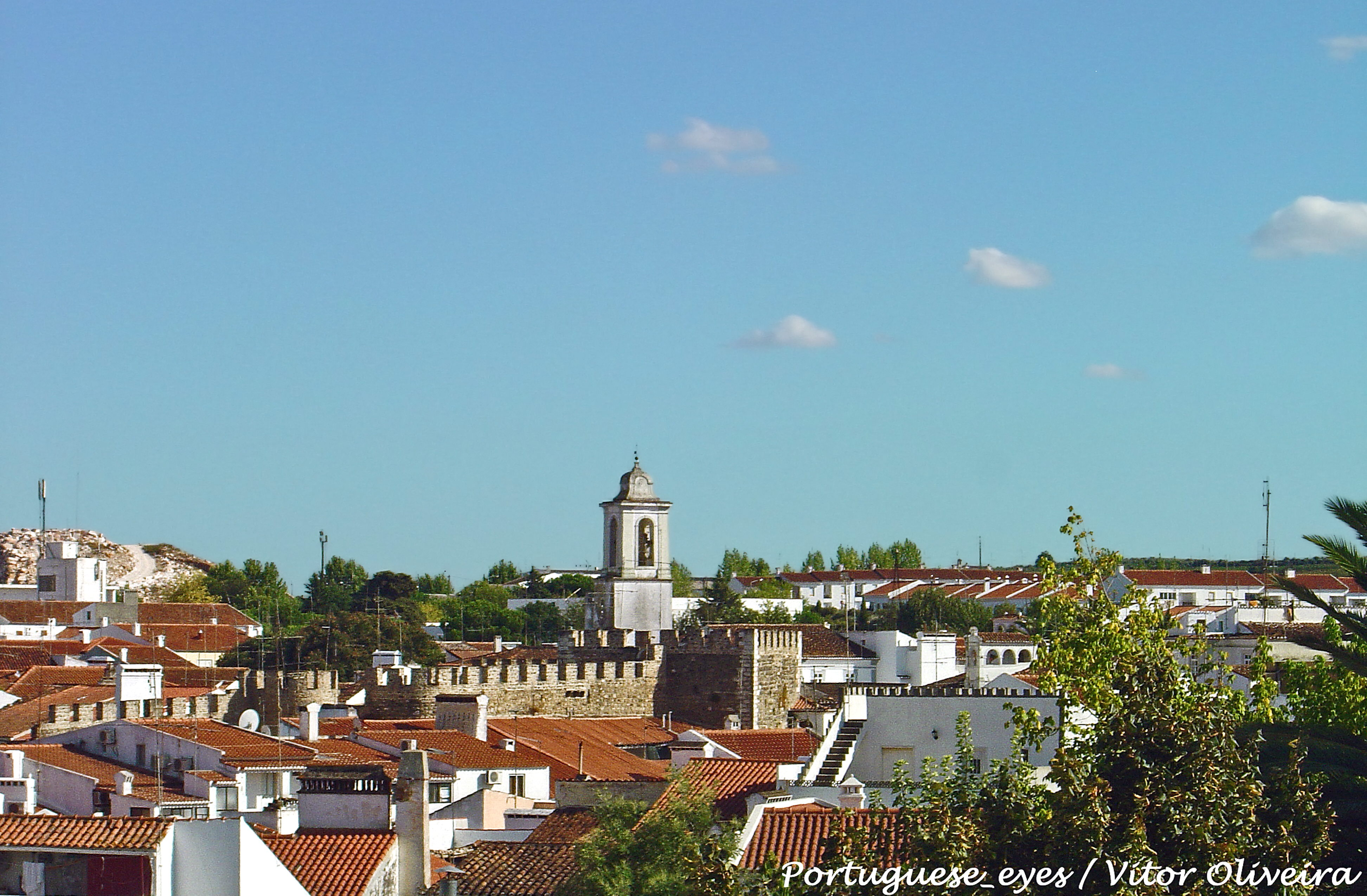

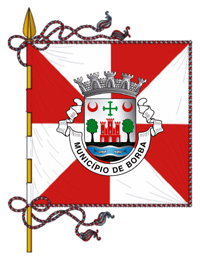
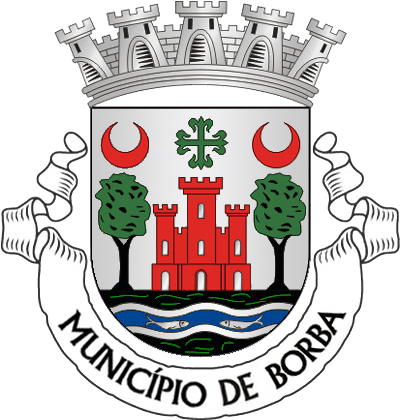
- Flag Coat of arms
- Interactive map of Borba
- Location in Portugal
- Coordinates: 38°48′N 7°27′W
- Country: Portugal
- Region: Alentejo
- Intermunic. comm.: Alentejo Central
- District: Évora
- Parishes: 4

Area
  - Total: 145.19 km^{2} (56.06 sq mi)

Population (2011)
  - Total: 7,333
  - Density: 50.51/km^{2} (130.8/sq mi)
- Time zone: UTC+00:00 (WET)
  - Summer (DST): UTC+01:00 (WEST)
- Local holiday: Easter Monday (date varies)
- Website: www.cm-borba.pt

Borba (European Portuguese pronunciation: [ˈbɔɾβɐ]), officially the Municipality of Borba (Portuguese: Município de Borba), is a municipality in the District of Évora in Portugal. The population in 2011 was 7,333, in an area of 145.19 km^{2}. It was elevated from town to city status on 12 June 2009.

The municipal holiday is Easter Monday.

== Parishes ==
Administratively, the municipality is divided into 4 civil parishes (freguesias):

- Borba (Matriz)
- Borba (São Bartolomeu)
- Orada
- Rio de Moinhos

== Notable people ==
- Vítor Norte (born 1951) an actor and voice actor.
- Luís Bilro (born 1971) a Portuguese retired football with 411 club caps

== See also ==
- Borba DOC
