= Tamarez =

Variety of grape

Tamarez is a white grape variety that is the basis for a white Portuguese wine. It is associated with the Alentejo region, and is used to produce Borba, Redondo, and Moscatel de Setúbal wines, among others. It is often added to wines to increase the yield from other grapes.
