= Mourisco tinto =

Variety of grape

Marufo
- Grape (Vitis)
- Color of berry skin: Noir
- Species: Vitis vinifera
- Also called: Mourisco Tinto and other synonyms
- Origin: Portugal
- VIVC number: 8086

Marufo or Mourisco tinto is a red Portuguese wine grape that is planted primarily in the Douro DOC. It is a recommended grape in Port wine production.

== Synonyms ==
Marufo is also known under the synonyms Abrunhal, Barrete De Padre, Brujidera, Crujidera, Lagrima Noir, Malvasia, Marouco, Marufa, Marujo, Morisco tinto, Moroco [sic], Mourico, Mourisca, Mourisco, Mourisco Du Douro, Mourisco Preto, Mourisco tinto, Tinta Amarela Grossa, Tinta Do Caramelo, and Tinta Grossa, Tinto Martinho.
