= Roupeiro =

Variety of grape

Roupeiro is a white Portuguese wine grape planted primarily in the Alentejo and Douro regions. In Alentejo, the grape is known as Alva. In the Douro, it is known as Codega.

== See also ==
- List of Portuguese wine grape varieties
