= Rabo de Ovelha =

Variety of grape

Rabo de Ovelha (Portuguese for "Sheep's tail") is white Portuguese wine grape variety that is grown all over Portugal. It should not be confused with the red Rabo de Anho grape variety that is found in the Vinho Verde region. Rabo de Ovelha is an authorized grape variety in the Bairrada, Borba, Bucelas, Redondo, Reguengos, Setúbal and Vidigueira Denominação de Origem Controlada (DOC). The grape variety gets its name from the way its grape bunches resembles the end of a ewe's tail. In winemaking, Rabo de Ovelha is known for producing highly alcoholic wines that wine expert Jancis Robinson describes as lacking subtlety.
