= Fernão Pires =

Variety of grape

- Grape (Vitis)
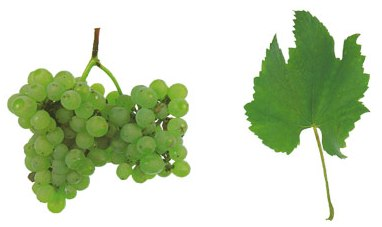
- Color of berry skin: Blanc
- Species: Vitis vinifera
- Also called: See list of synonyms
- Origin: Portugal
- Notable regions: Tejo, Bairrada
- Formation of seeds: Complete
- Sex of flowers: Hermaphrodite
- VIVC number: 4100

Fernão Pires is a white Portuguese wine grape grown throughout Portugal, especially in the Tejo and Bairrada, where it is also known as "Maria Gomes". This variety is known to produce wines with a spicy aromatic character, though often with delicate exotic fruity notes. Generally not expected to be a long-living wine, this wine is best drunk in its infancy or matured for up to 2 or 3 years. Outside of Portugal there are some significant plantings in South Africa.

== Synonyms ==
Fernão Pires is also known under the synonyms Camarate, Fernam Pires, Fernan Piriz, Fernão Pirão, Fernao Pires, Fernão Pires do Beco, Gaeiro, Gaieiro, Maria Gomes, and Molinha.

== See also ==
- List of Portuguese grape varieties
