= Denominação de Origem Controlada =

Highest Level of Protected Geographical Designation for Portuguese Wine

The denominação de origem controlada (or DOC) is the system of protected designation of origin for fruit, wines, cheeses, butters, and other agricultural products from Portugal.

== Wines ==
Portuguese wine regions, as well as producers of several other products, established this system following Portugal's entry into the European Union in 1986. It is similar to the French Appellation d'origine contrôlée (AOC), the Italian Denominazione di origine controllata (DOC), and the Spanish Denominación de Origen (DO) systems. The DOC system replaced the earlier Região Demarcada system of Portuguese appellations developed in the early 20th century.

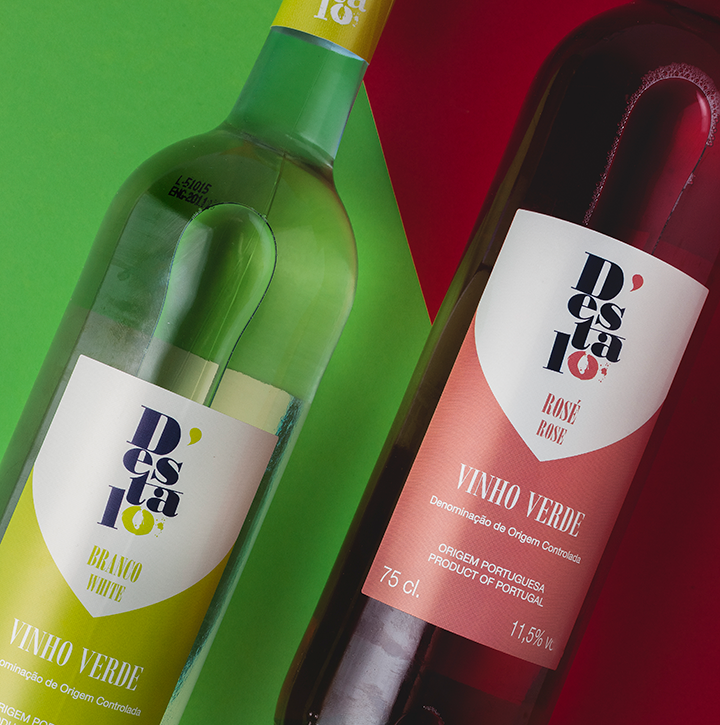
Example of a Portuguese Bottle of Vinho Verde with a Denominação de Origem Controlada stamp.

=== Regulation ===
In addition to protecting the designation of origin, the DOC also establishes regulations aimed at maintaining the quality level of the wines associated with a particular wine region. This includes establishing permitted grape varieties, regulating maximum crop yields at harvest, establishing minimum alcohol content, and periods of bottle or oak aging. Producers are required to submit finished wine samples to a regulating body to ensure compliance with DOC standards.

=== Other levels ===
In addition to the top-level DOC designation, there are two secondary tiers: Indicação de Proveniência Regulamentada (IPR) and Vinho Regional. IPRs are similar to DOC "in training" and indicate regions that have established their own regulating bodies but have not yet established an internationally recognizable identity for their wines. It is similar to the French Vin Délimité de Qualité Supérieure (VDSQ) system. Vinho Regional is similar to the French Vin de pays and is sort of a "catchall" classification for wines that do not qualify under the DOC or IPR designations.

== See also ==
- Agriculture in Portugal
- Protected designation of origin
  - Appellation (for wines)
- List of Portuguese wine regions
