= Sayago =

- Comarca
- Location in the province of Zamora.
- Country: Spain
- Autonomous community: Castile and León
- Province: Zamora
- Capital: Bermillo de Sayago
- Municipalities: List: Alfaraz de Sayago, Almeida de Sayago, Argañín, Bermillo de Sayago, Cabañas de Sayago, Carbellino, Fariza, Fermoselle, Fresno de Sayago, Gamones, Luelmo, Mayalde, Moral de Sayago, Moraleja de Sayago, Moralina, Muga de Sayago, Peñausende, Pereruela, Roelos de Sayago, Salce, Torregamones, Villadepera, Villar del Buey, Villardiegua de la Ribera

Area
  - Total: 1,484.6 km^{2} (573.2 sq mi)

Population
  - Total: 9,677
  - Density: 6.518/km^{2} (16.88/sq mi)
- Demonym: Sayaguese
- Time zone: UTC+1 (CET)
  - Summer (DST): UTC+2 (CEST)

Sayago is a comarca (county, but with no administrative role) in the province of Zamora in central Spain.

== Geography ==
The comarca is located at the southwest of the Zamora Province. The main geographical characteristic is the isolation caused by the Douro and Tormes rivers canyons. Its borders are, consequently, well defined, specially to the north (Douro canyon separates Sayago from Aliste comarca), to the west (Douro canyon separates Sayago from Portugal) and to the south (Tormes canyon and Almendra Dam separate Sayago from the province of Salamanca). East is the less marked border, which makes communications easy with Tierra del Pan and Zamora, the capital city of the province of Zamora.

Douro canyons are especially deep in the stretch shared with Portugal, as the erosion found better conditions to act than in previous zones. That has been the cause for the relatively low relations between the comarca and Portugal. The canyons have been used to build some reservoirs along the river in its journey through the comarca: San Román Dam, Villalcampo Dam, Castro Dam, Miranda Dam, Picota Dam and Bemposta Dam (the last three owned by Portugal), apart from the mentioned Almendra Dam. They all are for electricity production, making Sayago one of the most important hydroelectric areas in the whole country.

It is not only the canyons which define the landscape of Sayago. The highlands, where towns are located, form an extended peneplain with successions of hills and valleys caused by streams that join the Douro and Tormes rivers. Geologically, the most common terrain is composed by low-quality ground and many granite outcrops, with few areas of fertile floor around the streams.

The high value of this ecosystem has been recognized when in 2002 the Arribes del Duero Natural Park was declared. The Spanish — also known as the Sayaguese — word arribes refers to the Douro and Tormes canyons. This area is the home for many endangered bird species such as black stork and is known for a well-preservation of the native flora. Holm oak, common oak, juniper, broom or thyme are some of the species that dominates the flora scenario in Sayago.

== History ==
Human presence is dated since the Prehistoric Age, with examples like the stone boar in Villardiegua de la Ribera, few dolmens or other Yacimientos in municipalities such as Peñausende or Almeida de Sayago. But the first human settlement which left any kind of cultural presence was Vettones, a pre-Roman Celtic people, strongly influenced by the Central European cultures. The Roman Empire also made its mark in the comarca, with the foundation of some towns (an example is Fermoselle) and a net of Roman roads across the area, joining the towns and communicating them with the closest important cities. One of the main Roman roads in the Iberian Peninsula, Vía de la Plata, touches the east of the comarca, and helped the trading and the husbandry. Roman steles can be seen in some houses as they have been used as stones in the walls. Viriathus was the leader of the Lusitanian people during the resistance to the Roman expansion and was born in a Sayago's hamlet belonging to Bermillo de Sayago, Torrefrades.

During the Visigothic Kingdom in Spain, an own kingdom, called Sabaria, existed in the zone, but it was soon conquered by the Visigoths in the 6th century. Middle age passes by without any relevance and the isolation of Sayago begin to leave a deep mark in the character of the comarca. The Umayyad conquest of Hispania did not leave any remarkable architecture or tradition in Sayago. In contrast, the Catholic Church dominate the life of the Sayaguese people over the High Middle Ages, submitting the towns to a strict regime where peasants had to pay the tithe from what they collect in their respective farms and give it to the local Church.

There is a worrying lack of documents about all the period between the 14th century and 18th century. Only few inscriptions about the building of hermitages, cemeteries, and other religious points remained in archives. Unfortunately, it was necessary to wait for a bad date, the Peninsular War between Spain and the Napoleonic France to have any kind of news about the comarca. In its way to Portugal, the Grande Armée went through Sayago leaving awful memories in the Sayaguese people.

The Spanish Civil War also struck the county, with dozens of people killed because of their political sympathies. From then to now, Sayago has experimented phenomena like the rural exodus, or the 20th century diaspora that has led its population to decrease markedly. First it was attributed to the industrialization of Spanish cities, and now the lack of opportunities for young people is what makes them to move to urban areas. Isolation plays a crucial role in this situation. This could be attenuated by new initiatives like rural tourism or high-quality husbandry and agriculture.

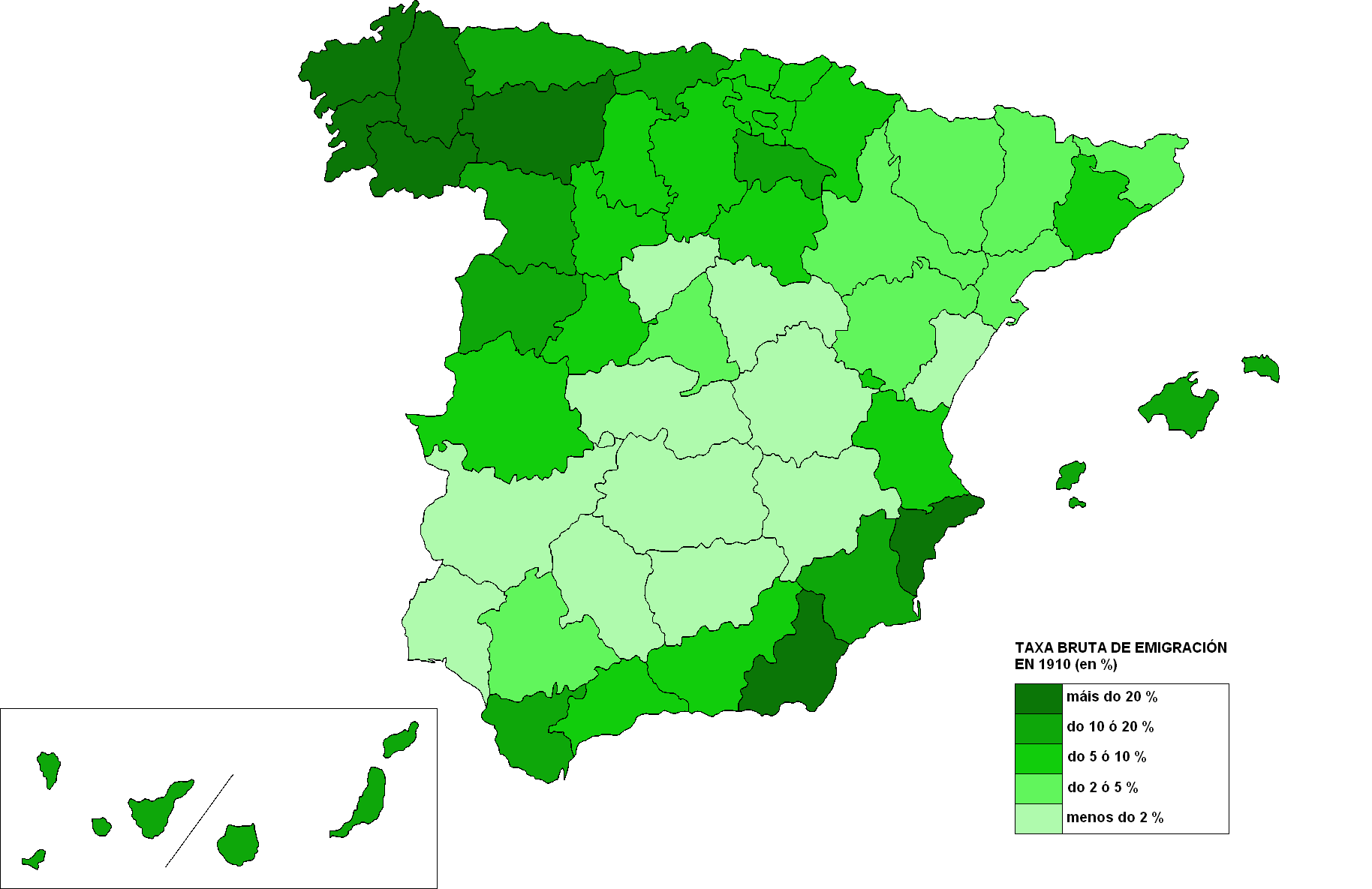
Map showing the incidence of emigration in 1910. Zamora province was an important emission point.

== Sayaguese dialect ==
Sayaguese dialect (in Spanish usually named Habla sayaguesa) is a local variant of Leonese language, an old vernacular Romance language used in the ancient Kingdom of León, and nowadays survives in some areas of León, Zamora and Bragança (Portugal). It is really similar to Asturian language. It is often characterized as a rustic way of expression, remarked by the Sayaguese people themselves because the historical isolation that affects the comarca. Indeed, during 16th and 17th centuries some Spanish authors (Lucas Fernández, Sánchez Badajoz,) included the term "Sayaguese" to imprint rurality and coarseness to his characters. This use strongly distorts the real nature of the dialect, adding some features or words that are not present in Sayago.

The main characteristics that define the dialect are the following ones:

- Conservation of the Latin /f/ instead of the /h/ used in Spanish (facer and not hacer)
- Double /l/ (llucha instead of Lucha)
- Conservation of an ending vocal, specially /e/ (sede instead of sed)

== Economy ==
The geography has played an important role in the characteristics of the county's economy. Because of its isolation, only saved by the "Puente Pino" (bridge linking with Aliste county through the canyon) and the two reservoirs of Miranda and Bemposta, that link by road Sayago with Portugal, the development possibilities had been so weak.

Farming has been an important activity, but the landscape (especially the common granite outcrops) set important difficulties to concentrate the lands of each owner in one (technique called Flurbereinigung), reducing the opportunities to be competitive in agriculture. The dispersion of the properties has to be found in the inheritance methods, dividing the plots between the heirs of each owner.

These conditions make the development of agriculture difficult, so these kind of land uses have not gone far from subsistence agriculture. Market gardens are supported by the local inhabitants to provide fresh vegetables and fruits.

Domestic life maintains many characteristics from the subsistence economy, as happens in the majority of the rural areas of Spain. In Sayago this is even a stronger phenomenon than in other counties, again because the geographical isolation that historically delays every forward from the urban areas. For example, running water is a relatively new service, there's no gas pipelines supplying the area (people have to use electrical heaters) or the Internet has been really difficult to introduce. It is also common to not have mobile coverage except in some elevated areas.

== See also ==
- Arribes del Duero Natural Park
- Zamora, Spain
- Province of Zamora
