= Arribes =

Arribes may refer to:

== Geography ==
- Arribes (geography), the banks of the rivers in the southeast of the province of Zamora and the northeast of the province of Salamanca, Castile and León, Spain.
- La Ribera de Salamanca (also named Las Arribes), a historic-traditional comarca in the province of Salamanca, Castile and León, Spain.
- Arribes del Duero Natural Park, a protected area in the southeast of the province of Zamora and the northeast of the province of Salamanca, Castile and León, Spain.
- Mancomunidad Arribes del Duero, a mancomunidad of the province of Salamanca, Castile and León, Spain.

== Gastronomy ==
- Arribes (wine), a wine denominación de origen of the province of Zamora and the province of Salamanca, Castile and León, Spain.
- Queso Arribes de Salamanca, a cheese marca de garantía of the province of Salamanca, Castile and León, Spain.
