= Fermoselle =

- Municipality
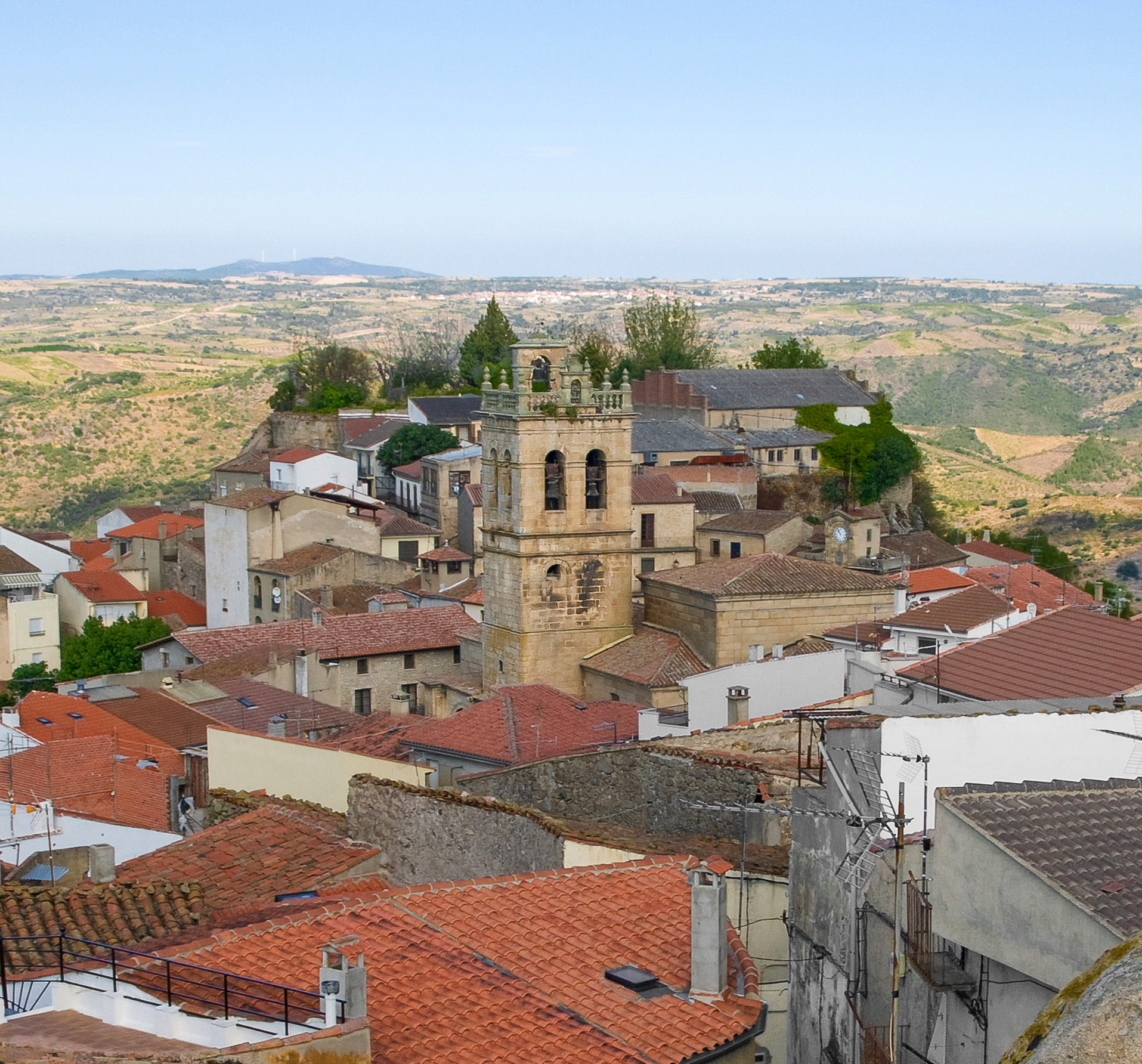

- Flag Coat of arms

- Location in Castile and León Location in Spain
- Coordinates: 41°19′N 6°24′W
- Country: Spain
- Autonomous community: Castile and León
- Province: Zamora
- Comarca: Sayago

Government
  - Mayor: José Manuel Pilo Vicente

Area
  - Total: 69.34 km^{2} (26.77 sq mi)

Population (2025-01-01)
  - Total: 1,131
  - Density: 16.31/km^{2} (42.25/sq mi)
- Time zone: UTC+1 (CET)
  - Summer (DST): UTC+2 (CEST)
- Website: www.fermoselle.es

Fermoselle is a small medieval village located in the province of Zamora, western Spain, and is part of the region of Castile and León in the south-west region of the province. It has a population of fewer than 1500.

The village of Fermoselle dates back more than 2,000 years to pre-Roman times, and has been well preserved through the centuries. It is the birthplace of Juan de La Encina (born Juan de Fermoselle), considered 'the father of Spanish theatre' by Oxford University. Fermoselle stands at over 700 metres (2,310 feet) above sea level on the Duero, near the edge of the Arribes cliffs over that river's 163 kilometre-long gorge.

The gorge is noted for green rock formations, some exceeding 150 metres in height, and is known as the Arribes del Duero.

Nearby is the largest natural park in Castile and León, the Arribes del Duero Natural Park, at the confluence of the Duero and the Tormes; the Duero forms the border with Portugal. It is a sanctuary for several endangered bird species, including as the black stork and the royal owl.

Fermoselle has been named a Historic, Cultural, Artistic and Architectural Conjunct of the Patrimony of Spain, as designated by The Commission of Spaniard Patrimony of Castile and León.

There are many extant examples of Roman architecture, including stellas found at the pilgrimage chapel of Santa Cruz, and working Roman water fountains. The area has many rustic stone houses, and narrow medieval streets set on stone pavers.

Fermoselle has a long history of viticulture. It harvests an autochthonous grape variety called Juan García, a survivor of the phylloxera blight, from terraced vineyards on the rim of the river gorge. The local micro-climate and terrain conditions are similar to Tuscany in Italy.

A Centre for the Interpretation of the Natural Park of The Arribes del Duero offers information, in various media, about the park environment.
