= Almeida de Sayago =

Coordinates: 41.2675°N 6.07506°W

Almeida de Sayago, Spain
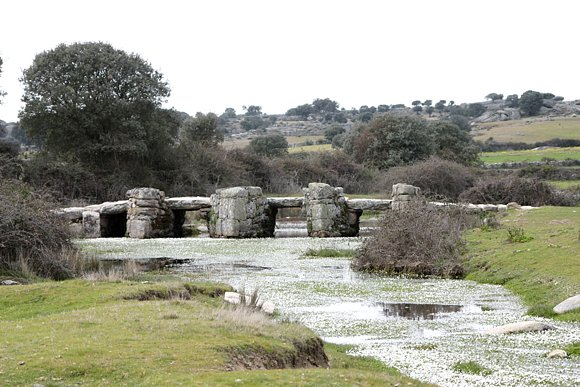
- El Rebollar bridge

- Flag Coat of arms
- Interactive map of Almeida de Sayago, Spain
- Country: Spain
- Autonomous community: Castile and León
- Province: Zamora
- Municipality: Almeida de Sayago

Area
  - Total: 76 km^{2} (29 sq mi)

Population (2025-01-01)
  - Total: 411
  - Density: 5.4/km^{2} (14/sq mi)
- Time zone: UTC+1 (CET)
  - Summer (DST): UTC+2 (CEST)
- Climate: Csb

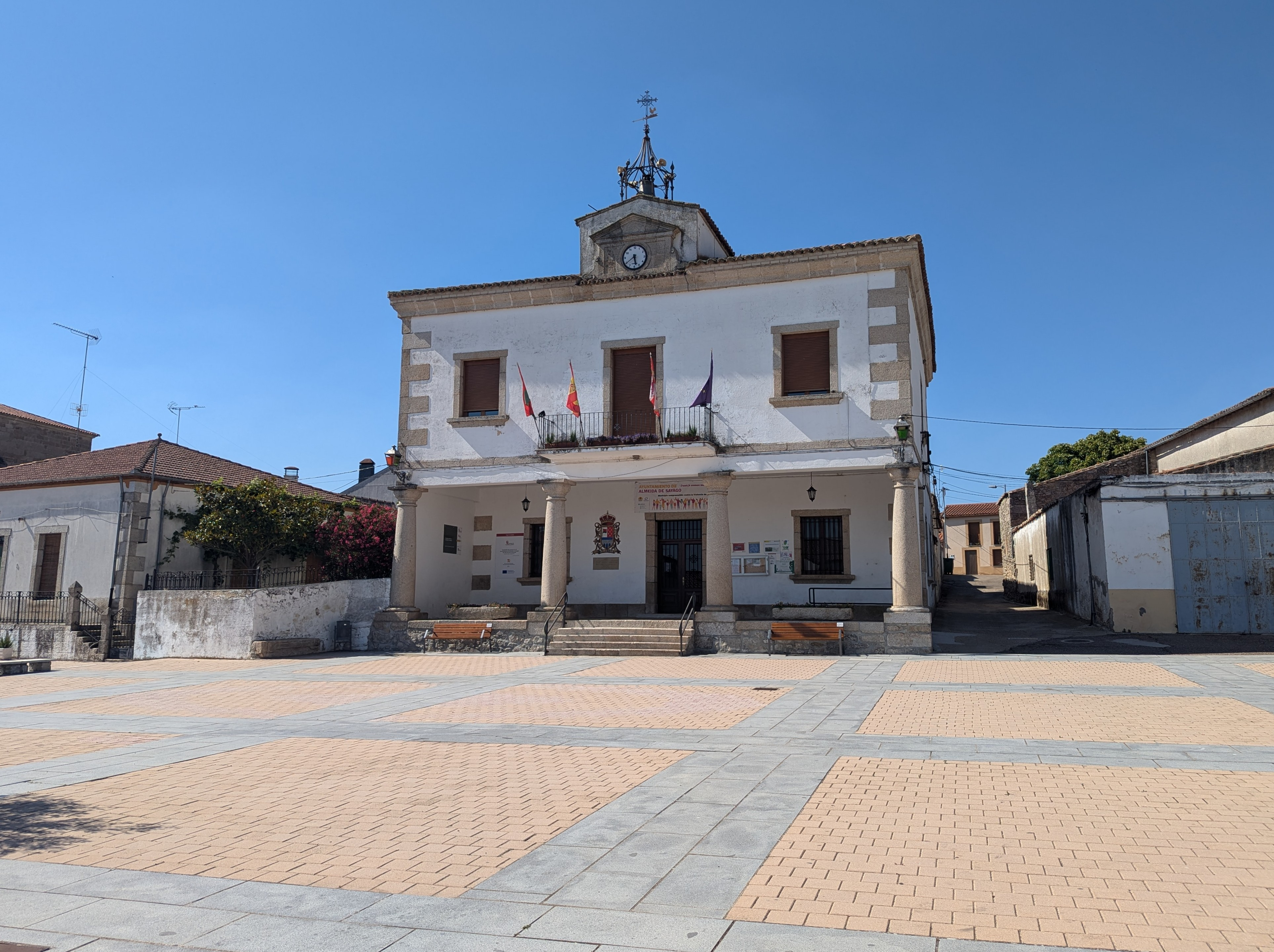
Casa consistorial de Almeida de Sayago

Almeida de Sayago is a municipality located in the province of Zamora, Castile and León, Spain. According to the 2024 Municipal Register of Spain, the municipality has a population of 422 inhabitants.

== Featured places ==
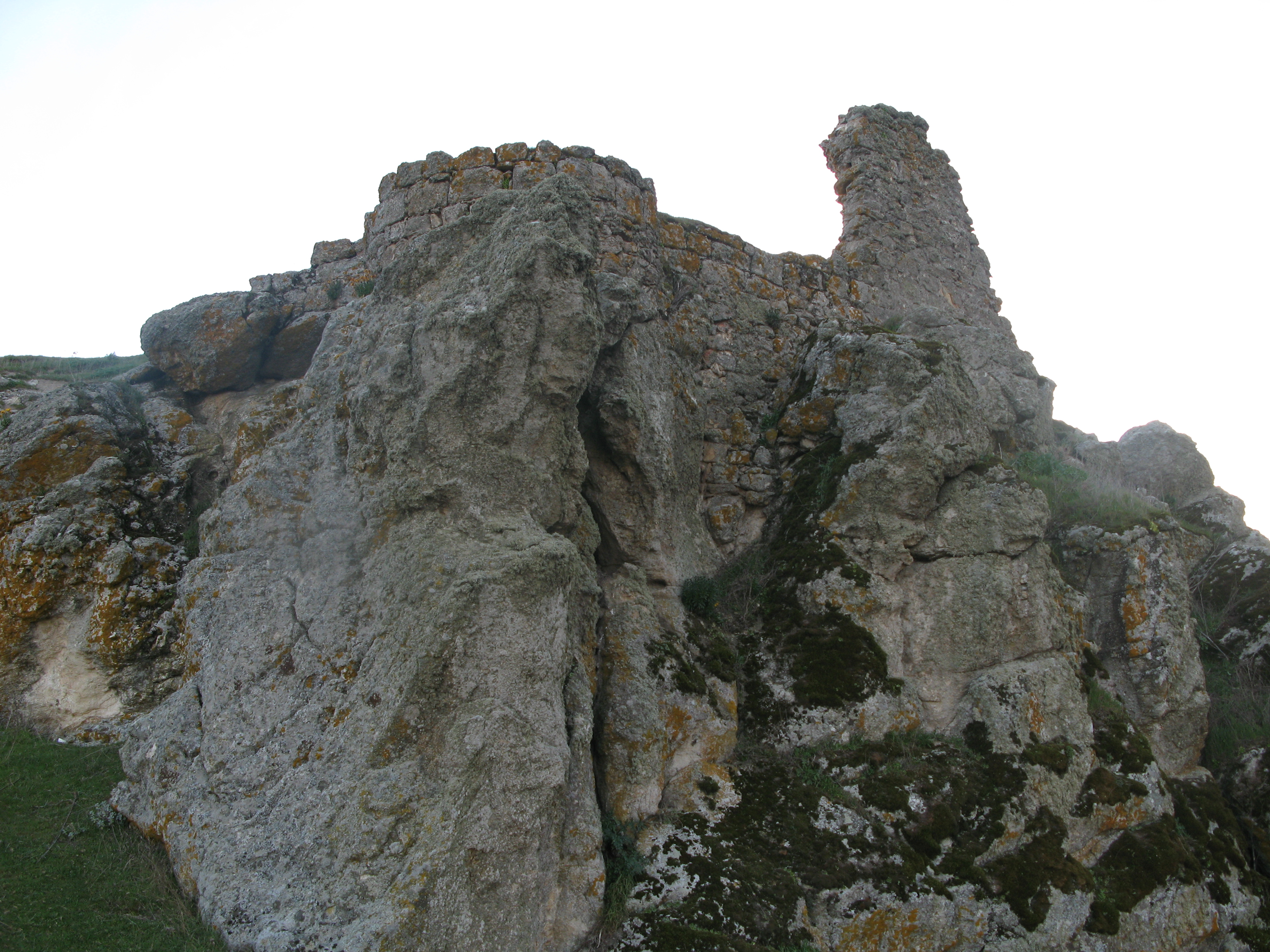
Castillo (Castle) de Peñausende

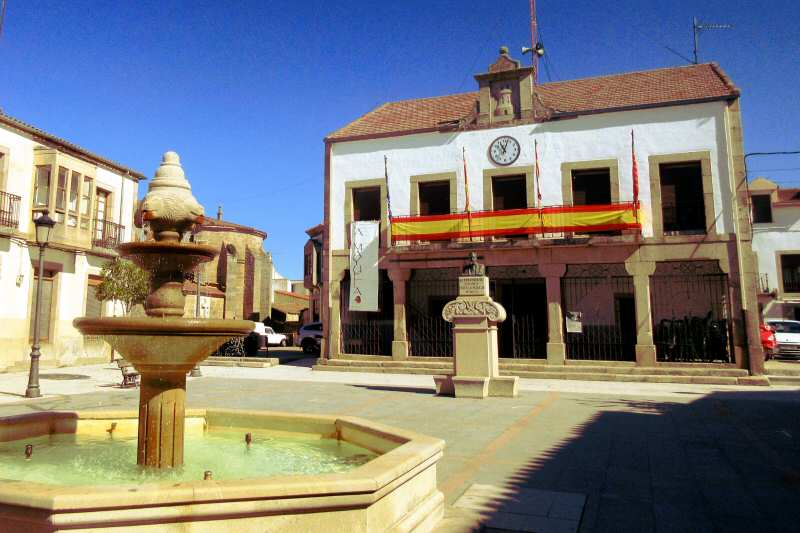
Plaza Mayor (main square) Bermillo de Sayago

There are many highlights in Almeida de Sayago. Some of the main ones are: Castillo de Asmesnal, Castillo de Peñausende, Iglesia de Santa Marina de Villar del Buey, Iglesia de Santa Marina de Villar del Buey, and Plaza Mayor de Bermillo de Sayago.

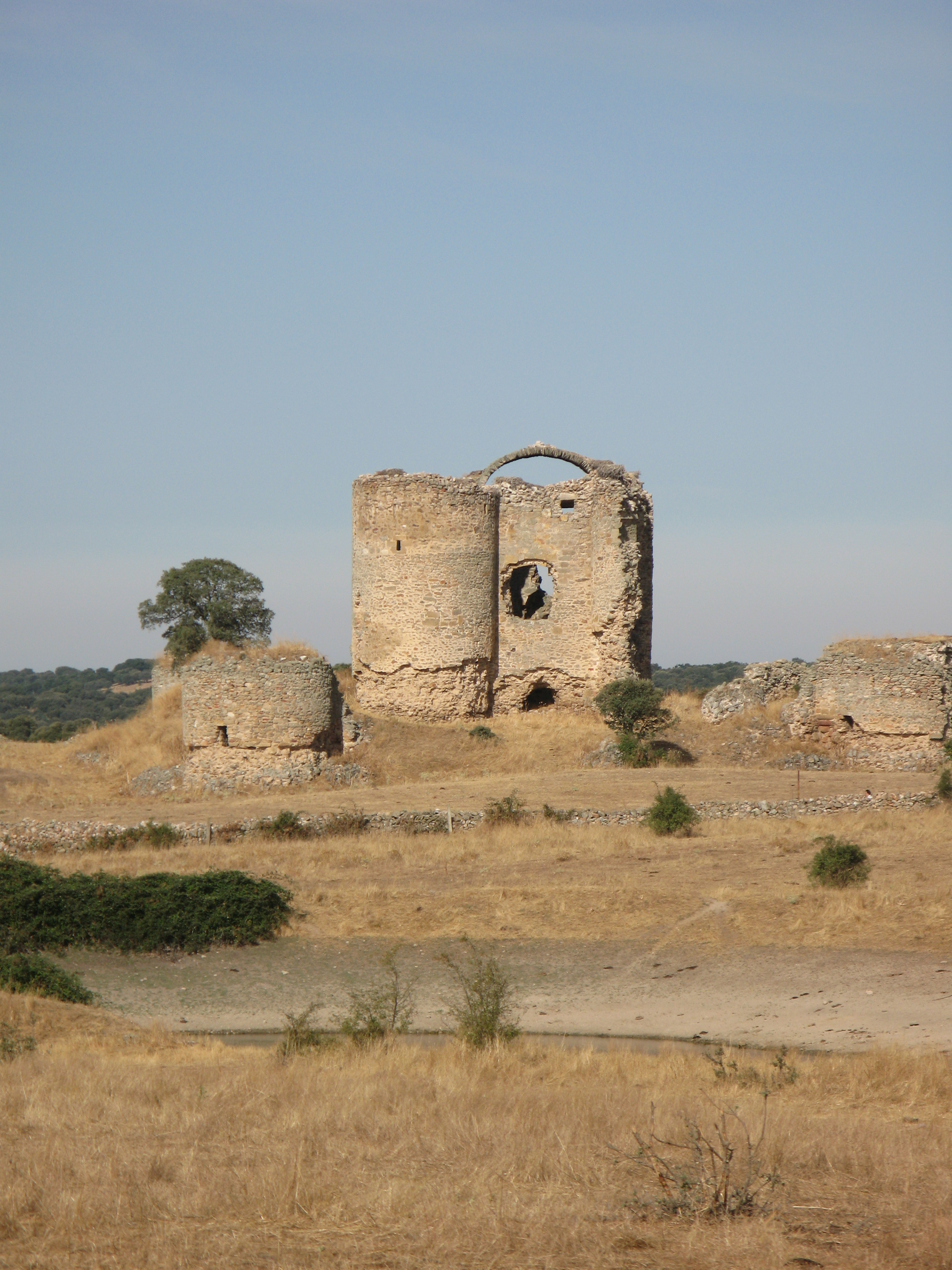
Castillo (Castle) del Asmesnal

== See also ==
- Arribes del Duero Natural Park
- Zamora city
- Zamora province
