= Moralina =

Coordinates: 41°29′N 6°08′W

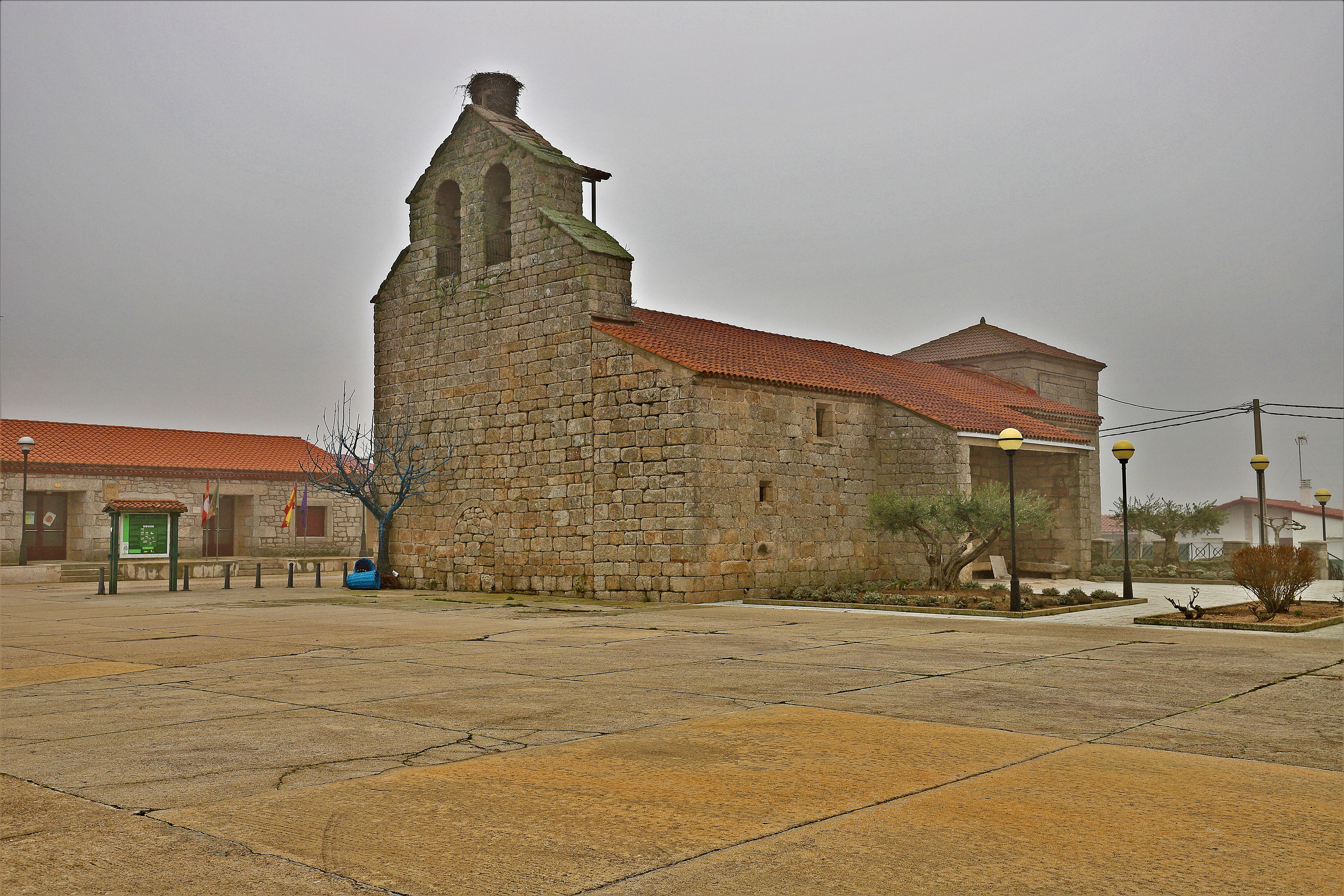

- Coat of arms
- Interactive map of Moralina
- Country: Spain
- Autonomous community: Castile and León
- Province: Zamora
- Municipality: Moralina

Government
  - Mayor: Edesio Cardeñosa (PSOE)

Area
  - Total: 21 km^{2} (8.1 sq mi)
- Elevation: 758 m (2,487 ft)

Population (2025-01-01)
  - Total: 211
  - Density: 10/km^{2} (26/sq mi)
- Time zone: UTC+1 (CET)
  - Summer (DST): UTC+2 (CEST)
- Website: Official website

Moralina (also called Moralina de Sayago) is a municipality located in the province of Zamora, Castile and León, Spain. According to the 2004 census (INE), the municipality has a population of 346 inhabitants. It is 42 km (26 mi) away from the city of Zamora. The village belongs to the Sayago county or comarca, and participates in the association Sayagua, which supplies the water and the recycling system in the whole county, as the municipies are too small and weak to maintain this kind of services by themselves.

The dominating landform in the area is the peneplain, with some streams eroding the surface in their path to the arribe, the canyon located at the east of the municipality. There are two old dehesas (an Iberian traditional form of pasturelands) called "Trabanquina" and "Requejo". Both, as many in this county, were sold to the municipalities between the 18th 19th centuries, and distributed among the inhabitants. That has disfigured the characteristics of both dehesas, changing the type of holding from a large estate to a small holding.

The economy is based in agriculture and husbandry (especially cows and sheep). Within last few years rural tourism has provided a new and hopeful source of income since the surrounding areas were declared as a natural reserve, called Arribes del Duero Natural Park. This declaration was justified by the high ecological value of the river Duero canyons (called "Arribes" in Sayago).

Although is suffering the effects of the general depopulation that involves the rural areas of the province, it is one of the most actives villages in the Sayago county. One example of this activity is the craft fair that takes place on every 15 August. Statistics show the mentioned depopulation since the rural flight started in Spain in the 1960s:
