= Biodiversity of Portugal =

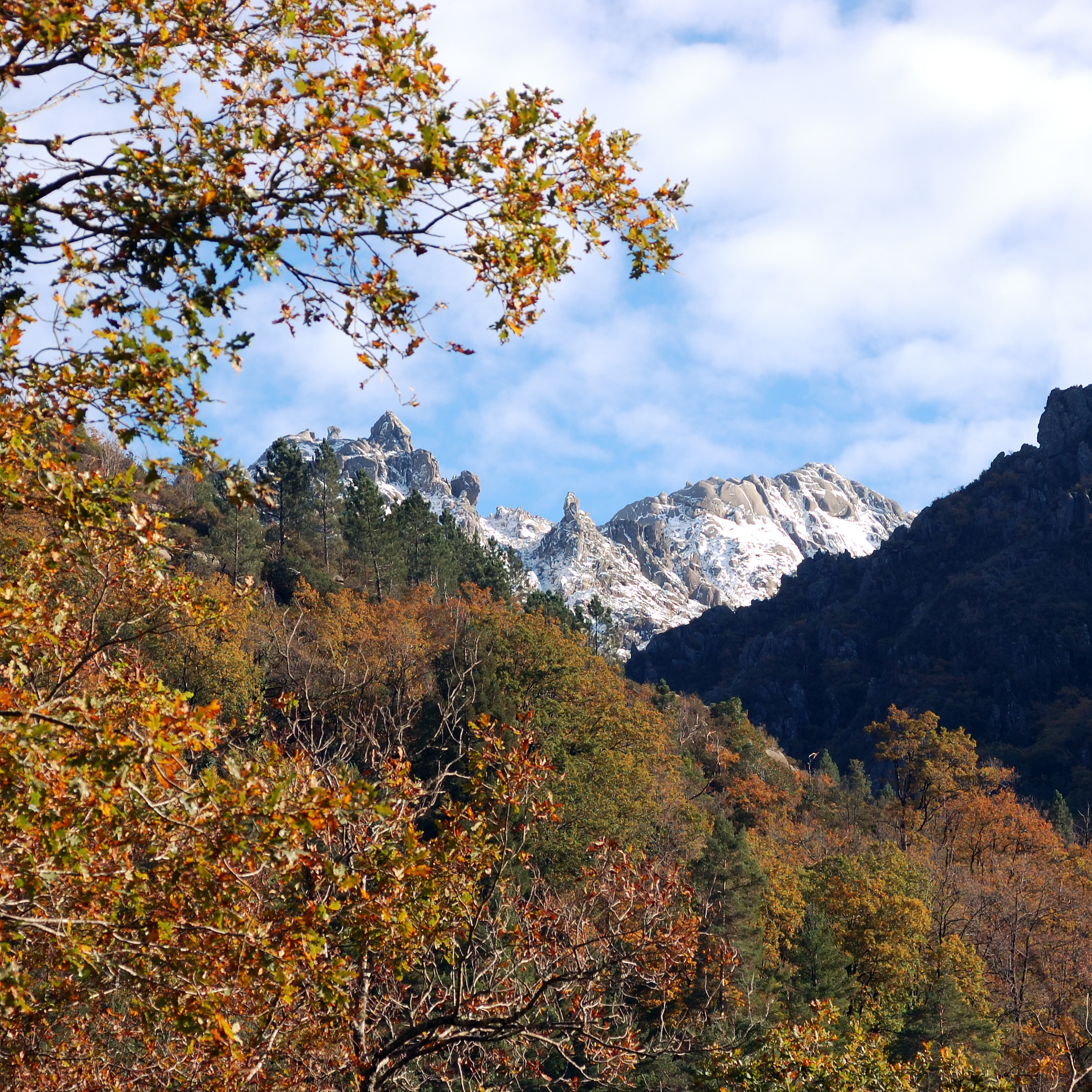
Peneda-Gerês National Park is the only nationally designated park in Portugal, owing to the rarity and significance of its environment.

Portugal is located on the Mediterranean Basin, the third most diverse hotspot of flora in the world. Due to its geographical and climatic context - between the Atlantic and Mediterranean - Portugal has a high level of biodiversity on land and at sea. It is home to six terrestrial ecoregions: Azores temperate mixed forests, Cantabrian mixed forests, Madeira evergreen forests, Iberian sclerophyllous and semi-deciduous forests, Northwest Iberian montane forests, and Southwest Iberian Mediterranean sclerophyllous and mixed forests. Over 22% of its land area is included in the Natura 2000 network, including 62 special conservation areas and 88 types of protected landscape natural habitats.

Eucalyptus (non-native, commercial plantations), cork oak and maritime pine together make up 71% of the total forested area of continental Portugal, followed by the holm oak, the stone pine, the other oak trees (Q. robur, Q. faginea and Q. pyrenaica) and the sweet chestnut, respectively. In Madeira, laurisilva (recognized as a World Heritage Site) dominates the landscape, especially on the northern slope. The predominant species in this forest include Laurus novocanariensis, Apollonias barbujana, Ocotea foetens and Persea indica. Before human occupation the Azores were also rich in dense laurisilva forests, today these native forests are undermined by the introduced Pittosporum undulatum and Cryptomeria japonica. There have been several projects aimed to recover the Laurisilva present in the Azores. Remnants of these laurisilva forests are also present in continental Portugal with its few living testimonies Laurus nobilis, Prunus lusitanica, Arbutus unedo, Myrica faya and Rhododendron ponticum.

These geographical and climatic conditions facilitate the introduction of exotic species that later turn to be invasive and destructive to the native habitats. Around 20% of the total number of extant species in continental Portugal are exotic. In Madeira, around 36% and in the Azores, around 70% species are exotic. Due to this, Portugal was placed 168th globally out of 172 countries on the Forest Landscape Integrity Index in 2019.

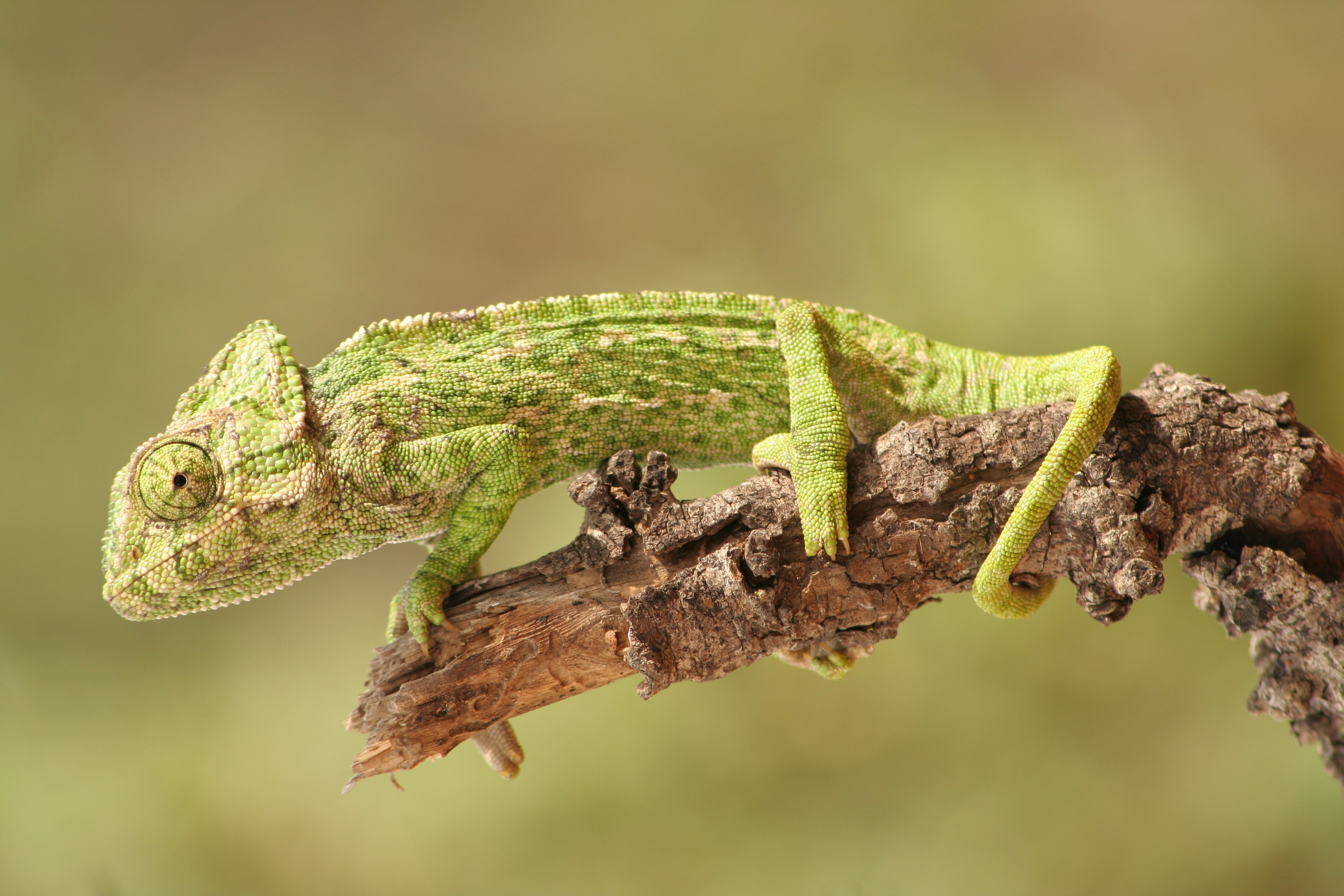
Chameleo from Algarve

Portugal is the second country in Europe with the highest number of threatened animal and plant species (488 as of 2020).

Portugal as a whole is an important stopover for migratory bird species: the southern marshes of the eastern Algarve (Ria Formosa, Castro Marim) and the Lisbon Region (Tagus Estuary, Sado Estuary) hosting various aquatic bird species, the Bonelli's eagle and Egyptian vulture on the northern valleys of the Douro International, the black stork and griffon vulture on the Tagus International, the seabird sanctuaries of the Savage Islands and Berlengas and the highlands of Madeira and São Miguel all represent the great diversity of wild avian species (around 450 in continental Portugal), not only migratory but also endemic (e.g. trocaz pigeon, Azores bullfinch) or exotic (crested myna, pin-tailed whydah).

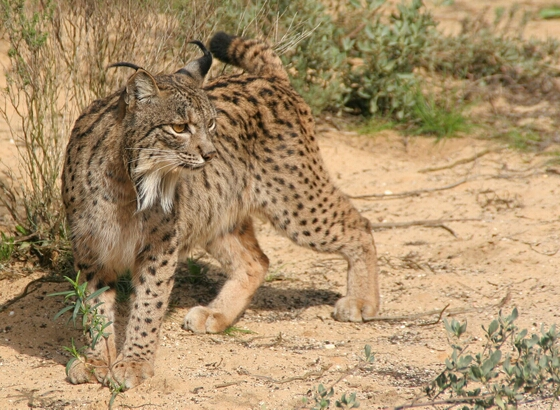
Portugal supports conservation efforts of the Iberian Lynx.

The large mammalian species of Portugal (the fallow deer, red deer, roe deer, Iberian ibex, wild boar, red fox, Iberian wolf and Iberian lynx) were once widespread throughout the country, but intense hunting, habitat degradation and growing pressure from agriculture and livestock reduced population numbers on a large scale in the 19th and early 20th century, others, such as the Portuguese ibex were even led to extinction. Today, these animals are re-expanding their native range. Smaller mammals include the red squirrel, European badger, Eurasian otter, Egyptian mongoose, Granada hare, European rabbit, common genet, European wildcat, among others.

Due to their isolated location, the volcanic islands of the Azores, Madeira and Salvages, part of Macaronesia, have many endemic species that have evolved independently from their European, African and occasionally American relatives.

The Portuguese west coast is part of the four major Eastern Boundary Upwelling Systems of the ocean. This seasonal upwelling system typically seen during the summer months brings cooler, nutrient rich water up to the sea surface promoting phytoplankton growth, zooplankton development and the subsequent rich diversity in pelagic fish and other marine invertebrates.

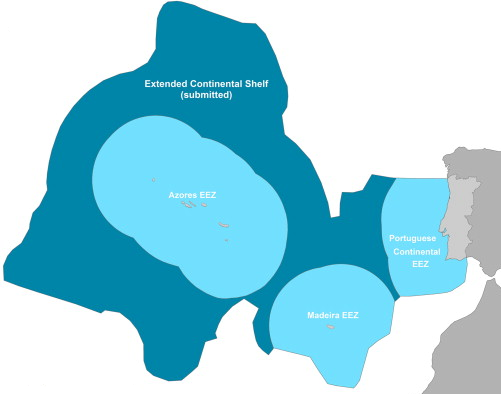
Exclusive economic zone of Portugal

This, adding to its large EEZ makes Portugal one of the largest per capita fish-consumers in the world. Sardines (Sardina pilchardus) and horse mackerel (Trachurus trachurus) are collected in the thousands every year. while blue whiting, monkfish, Atlantic cod, cephalopods, skates or any other form of seafood are traditionally fished in the local coastal villages. This upwelling also allows Portugal to have kelp forests which are otherwise very uncommon or non-existent on the Mediterranean.

73% of the freshwater fish occurring in the Iberian Peninsula are endemic, the largest out of any region in Europe. Many of these endemic species are concentrated in bodies of water of the central western region (one exclusively endemic), these and other bodies of water throughout the Peninsula are mostly temporary and prone to drought every year, placing most of these species under Threatened status.

Around 24 to 28 species of cetacean roam through the Azores, making it one of four places in the world where most species of this infraorder occur. Starting in the mid-19th century and ceasing in 1984, whaling (especially of sperm whale) heavily exploited this diversity. Beginning in the early 90s, whale watching quickly grew to popularity and is now one of the main economic activities in the Portuguese archipelago.

Some protected areas in Portugal other than the ones previously mentioned include: the Serras de Aire e Candeeiros with its limestone formations, paleontological history and great diversity in bats and orchids, the Southwest Alentejo and Vicentine Coast Natural Park with its well preserved, wild coastline. the Montesinho Natural Park which hosts some of the only populations of Iberian wolf and recent sightings of Iberian brown bear, which had been considered extinct in the country; among other species.
