= Juan García (grape) =

Variety of grape

- Grape (Vitis)
- Color of berry skin: Noir
- Species: Vitis vinifera
- Also called: Mouratón, Gorda, and other synonyms
- Origin: Spain
- Pedigree parent 1: Cayetana
- Pedigree parent 2: Alfrocheiro Preto
- Notable regions: Ribeira Sacra, Arribes
- Formation of seeds: Complete
- Sex of flowers: Hermaphrodite
- VIVC number: 8082

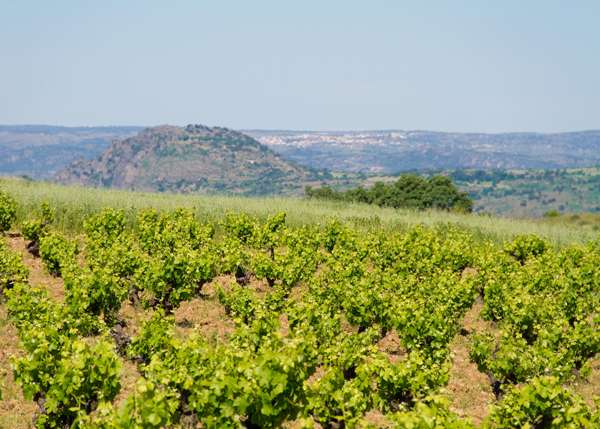
Vineyard in the Arribes del Duero Natural Park, Spain.

Juan García is a rare Spanish red grape variety. The Juan García grape variety is found mainly within the province of Zamora and Salamanca, mainly concentrated to the vineyard terraces planted and harvested through the centuries in the terroirs of the small ancient villages once remotely built and enclaved alongside the border of the gargantuan green gorge of the Arribes del Duero river canyon. It is also an authorized grape variety in the Denominación de Origen of Arribes and the Ribeira Sacra.

Juan García is considered a pre-phylloxera variety autochthonous of the villages that are located bordering the Arribes del Duero river canyon´s passage in north-western Spain. The location is designated as a Natural Park. The Juan García grape variety has medium sized, elliptical berries with dark blue-black skins that grow in compact bunches on short pedicels. Bud break is mostly early, vigor is medium-high, and it is highly productive. The variety shows good resistance to powdery mildew. The elaboration of wine utilizing the rare Juan García grape variety produces a unique taste different with a profound deep burgundy color that is particularly smooth tasting with a long nose.

== Synonyms ==
Juan García is also known as Tinta Gorda, Mouratón, Negreda, Negreda preta, Negrera, Nepada, and Tinta negreda.
