= Ramiro Ruiz Medrano =

Spanish politician (born 1958)

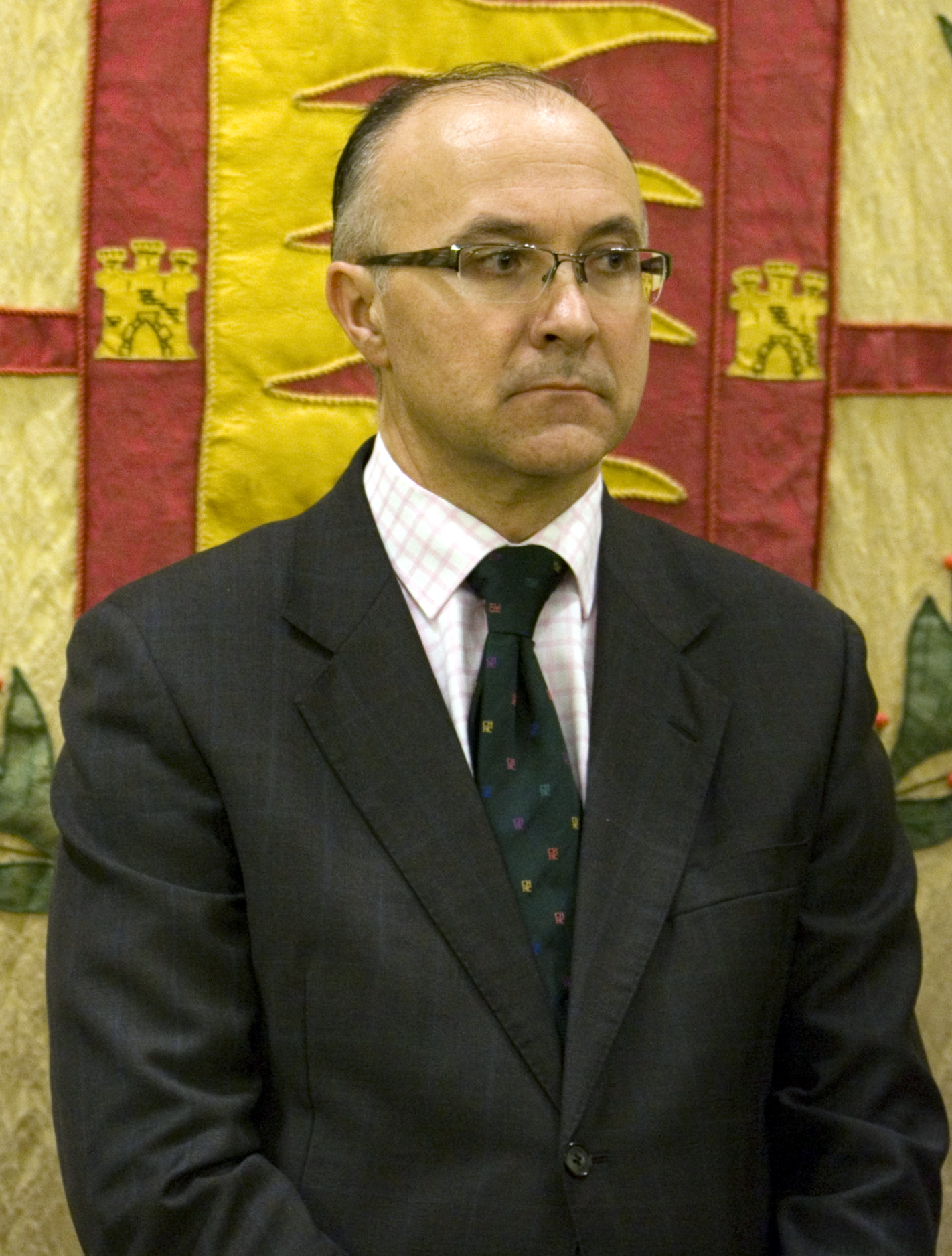
- Ramiro Ruiz Medrano

Government Delegation in Castile and León
- In office 16 January 2012 – 10 April 2015
- Preceded by: Miguel Alejo
- Succeeded by: Juan Carlos Suárez-Quiñones

President of the Deputation of Valladolid
- In office 16 November 1993 – 22 June 2011
- Preceded by: Juan Antonio García Calvo
- Succeeded by: Jesús Julio Carnero

Senator
- In office 29 June 1993 – 9 January 1996

Member of the Congress of Deputies
- In office 1989–1993

Personal details
- Born: Ramiro Felipe Ruiz Medrano; 3 June 1958 (age 68) Renedo de Esgueva, Valladolid, Spain
- Party: People's Party
- Education: University of Valladolid
- Occupation: Politician

Ramiro Ruiz Medrano (born 3 June 1958) is a Spanish politician of the People's Party of Castile and León. He was a member of the Congress of Deputies from 1989 to 1993, and the Government Delegate in Castile and León, in office from 16 January 2012 to 10 April 2015. He was president of the provincial deputation of Valladolid from 1993 to 2011. He became the president of the Valladolid People's Party in 2009.

== Biography ==
Ramiro Ruiz was born in Renedo de Esgueva, Spain. He earned a Master of Arts from the University of Valladolid, and was professor of general basic education (EGB). Ramiro Ruiz was mayor of Renedo de Esgueva from 1983 to 1999. Ramiro Ruiz was elected senator in the fifth legislature and deputy in the fourth legislature. He was a deputy and first vice-president of the Cortes of Castile and León from 2015 to 2019.
