= Tagus International Natural Park =

Protected nature area in Iberia

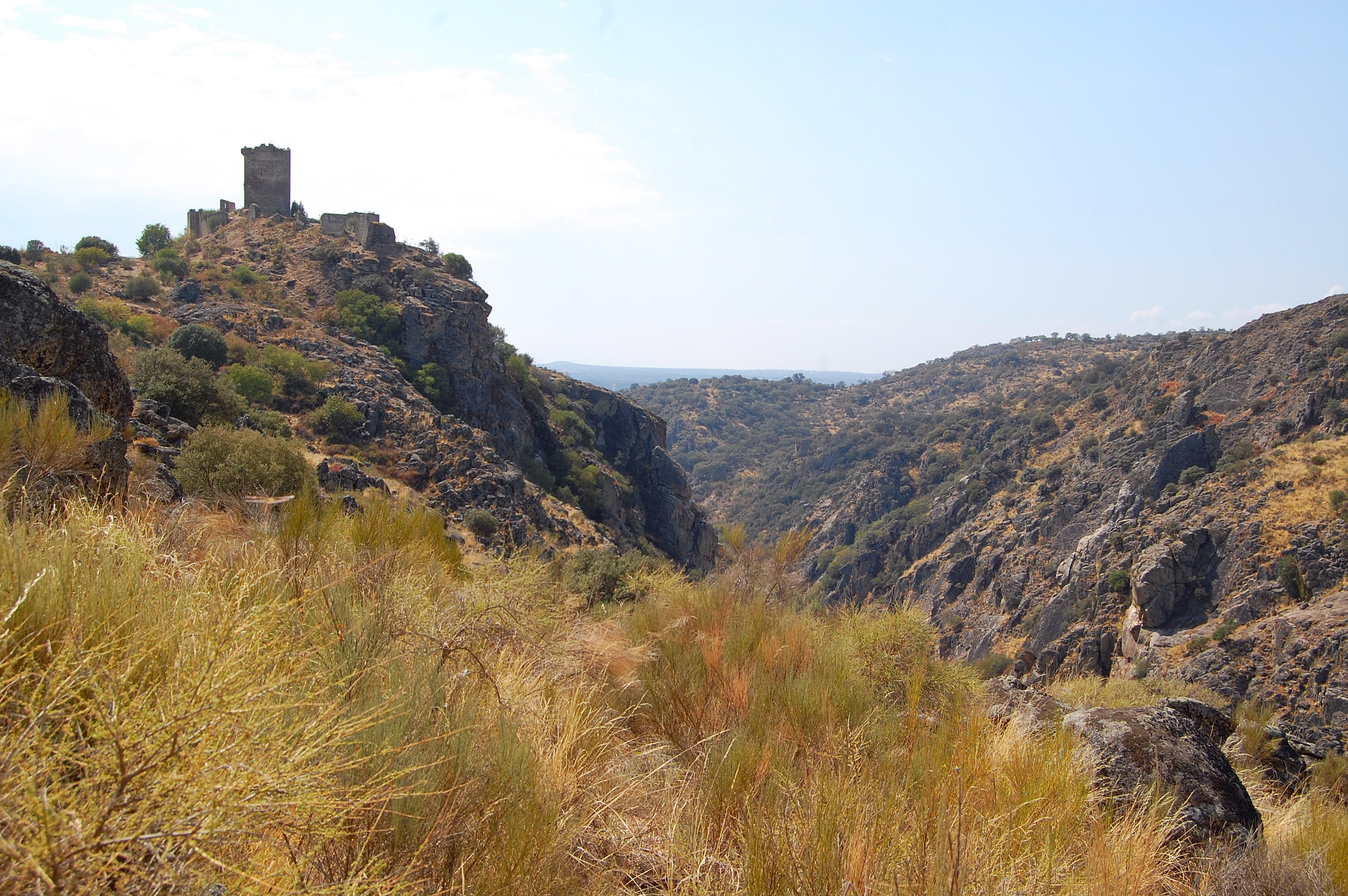
- The park as seen from the Erges river canyon, a tributary of the Tagus

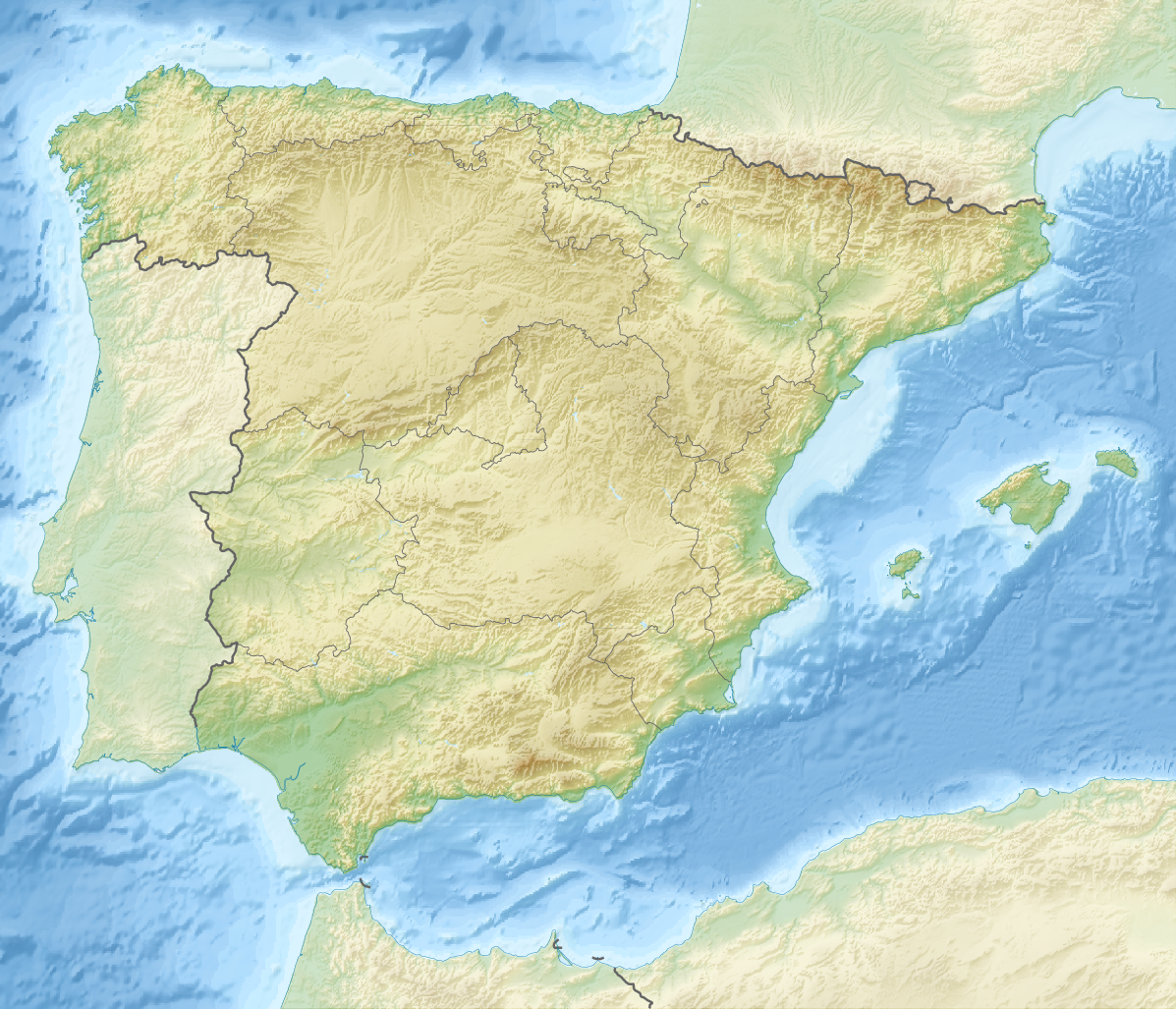
- Location within Iberia
- Coordinates: 39°39′35.6″N 7°12′56.5″W
- Area: 512.32 km^{2} (197.81 sq mi)
Parque Natural do Tejo Internacional
- IUCN category V (protected landscape/seascape)
- Location: Castelo Branco District, Portugal
- Area: 264.91 km^{2} (102.28 sq mi)
- Created: 18 August 2000
- Governing body: ICNF, Quercus, Vila Velha de Ródão Municipality
Parque natural del Tajo Internacional
- IUCN category Ia (strict nature reserve)
- Location: Province of Cáceres, Spain
- Area: 250.41 km^{2} (96.68 sq mi)
- Created: 7 July 2006
- Governing body: Government of Extremadura

The Tagus International Natural Park (Portuguese: Parque Natural do Tejo Internacional, Spanish: Parque natural del Tajo Internacional) is a protected area in Portugal and Spain. It is an important area for the conservation of several species of birds that nest on the rugged banks of rivers and surrounding areas. It is also one of the lowest human density areas in the Iberian Peninsula.

For part of its course, the River Tagus forms the boundary between Spain and Portugal. Areas on both sides of the river are designated as natural parks by the respective nations. However, while the Portuguese side of the park is a IUCN category V (protected landscape), the Spanish side is categorized as a wilderness area, thus being much more restricted.

== See also ==
- Douro International Natural Park & Arribes del Duero Natural Park
