= Miguel Alejo =

Spanish politician (born 1950)

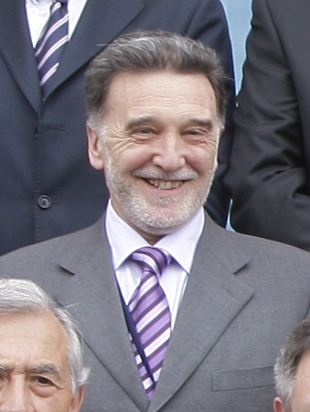
- Miguel Alejo

Councilor of the León
- In office 1995–2003

Delegate of the Government in Castile and León
- In office 2004–2011

Mayor of Almeida de Sayago

Personal details
- Born: Miguel Alejo Vicente; 1950 (age 75–76) Almeida de Sayago, Spain
- Party: Spanish Socialist Workers' Party
- Education: University of Salamanca
- Occupation: Politician; Civil servant

Miguel Alejo Vicente (born 1950) is a Spanish politician and civil servant. He is a member of the Spanish Socialist Workers' Party. He is the current Mayor of Almeida de Sayago since 2015. He was a councilor of the León from 1995 to 2003. He was a delegate of the government in Castile and León.

== Biography ==
Miguel Alejo was born in Almeida de Sayago, Spain in 1950. He studied at the University of Salamanca and received a Degree in Romance Philology.
