= Luelmo =

Coordinates: 41°26′N 6°08′W

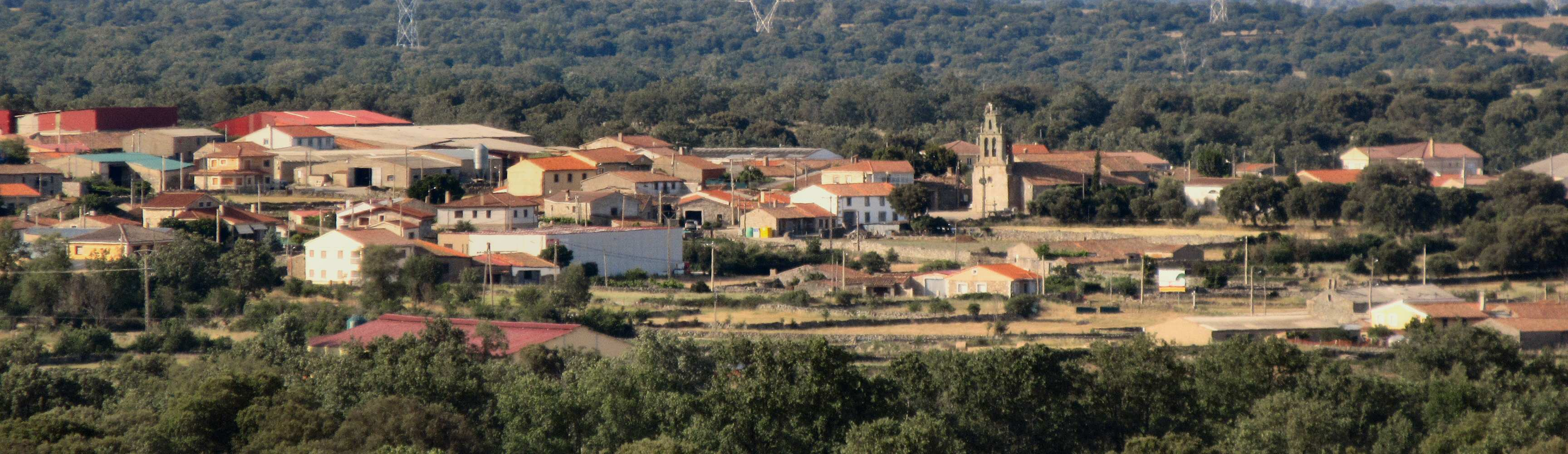

- Flag Coat of arms
- Interactive map of Luelmo
- Country: Spain
- Autonomous community: Castile and León
- Province: Zamora
- Municipality: Luelmo

Area
  - Total: 36 km^{2} (14 sq mi)

Population (2025-01-01)
  - Total: 148
  - Density: 4.1/km^{2} (11/sq mi)
- Time zone: UTC+1 (CET)
  - Summer (DST): UTC+2 (CEST)

Luelmo is a municipality located in the province of Zamora, Castile and León, Spain; and in the territorial area of Sayago. According to the 2004 census (INE), the municipality has a population of 228 inhabitants.

The landscape of the municipality is dominated by the Sayaguese peneplain, succeeding hills and streams leading to Duero river.
