= Peñausende =

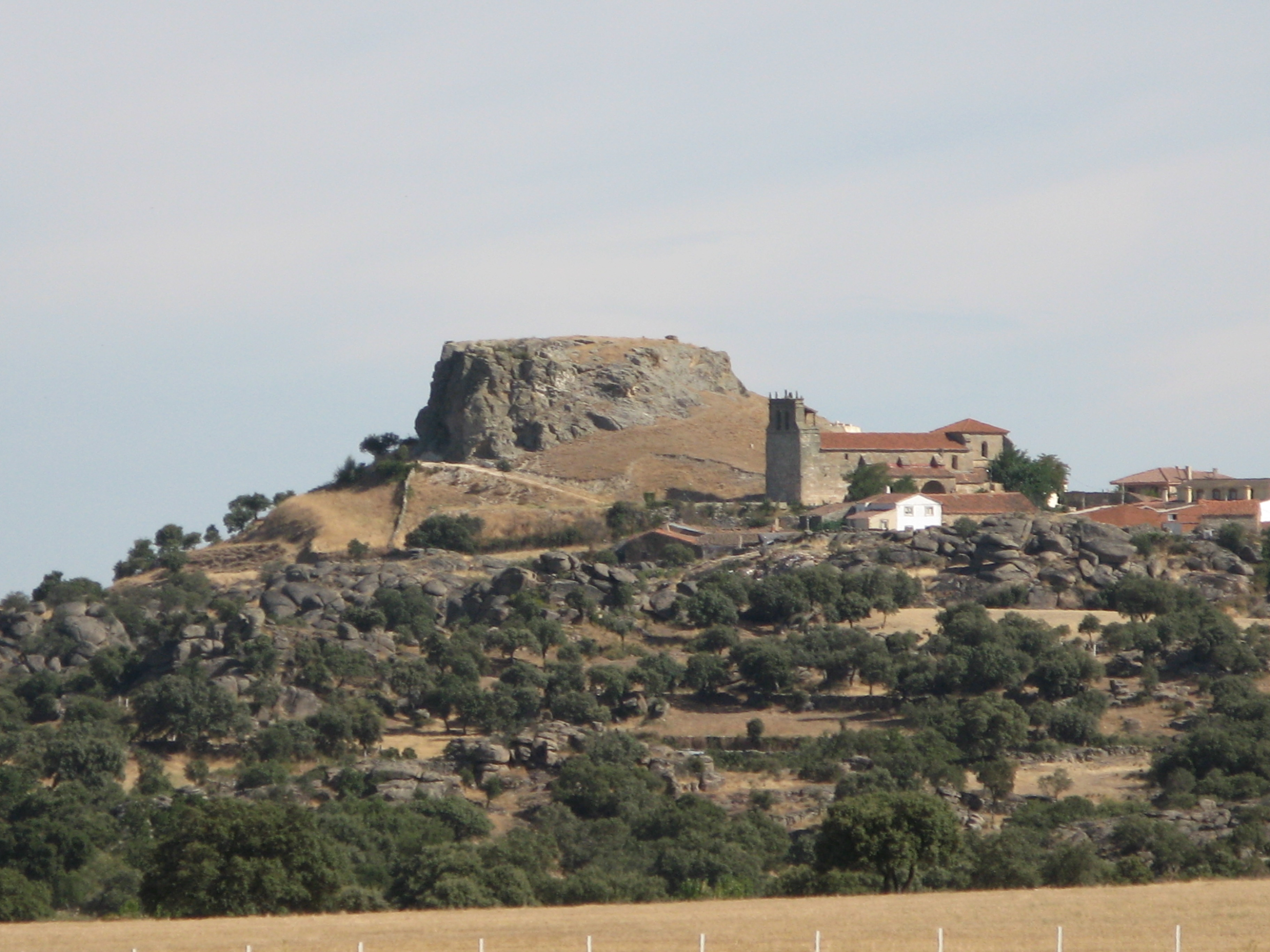

- Flag Coat of arms

- Location in Spain.
- Coordinates: 41°17′11″N 5°22′3″W
- Country: Spain
- Autonomous community: Castile and León
- Province: Zamora
- Comarca: Sayago

Government
  - Mayor: Manuel Alfonso Rivera Sastre

Area
  - Total: 95.02 km^{2} (36.69 sq mi)
- Elevation: 872 m (2,861 ft)

Population (2025-01-01)
  - Total: 386
  - Density: 4.06/km^{2} (10.5/sq mi)
- Demonym: Peñausendino
- Time zone: UTC+1 (CET)
  - Summer (DST): UTC+2 (CEST)

Peñausende (Spanish pronunciation: [peɲawˈsende]) is a municipality located in the province of Zamora, Castile and León, Spain.

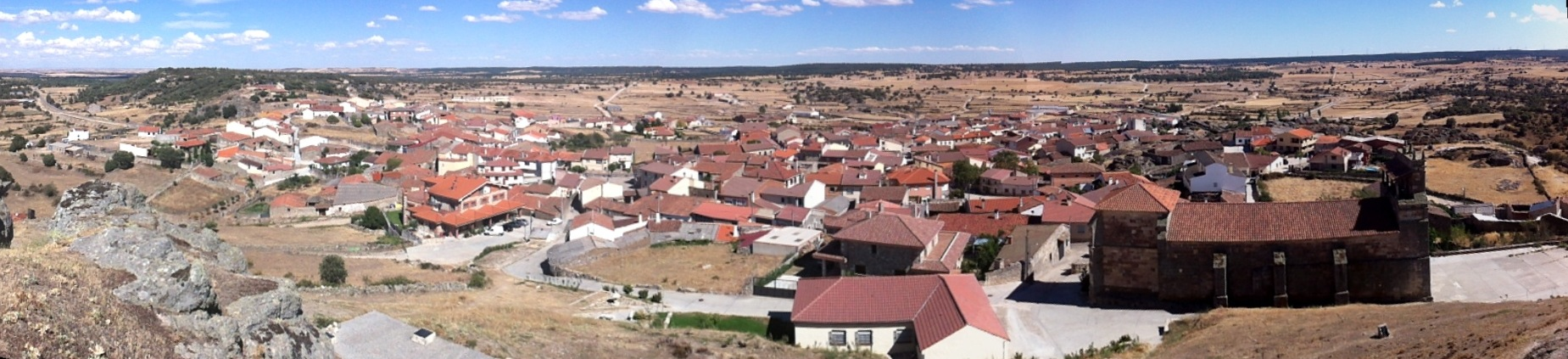
Panoramic view of Peñausende from "The Castle" (909 m).

== See also ==
- Arribes del Duero Natural Park
- Zamora city
- Zamora province
