= Bermillo de Sayago =

Place in Castile and León, Spain

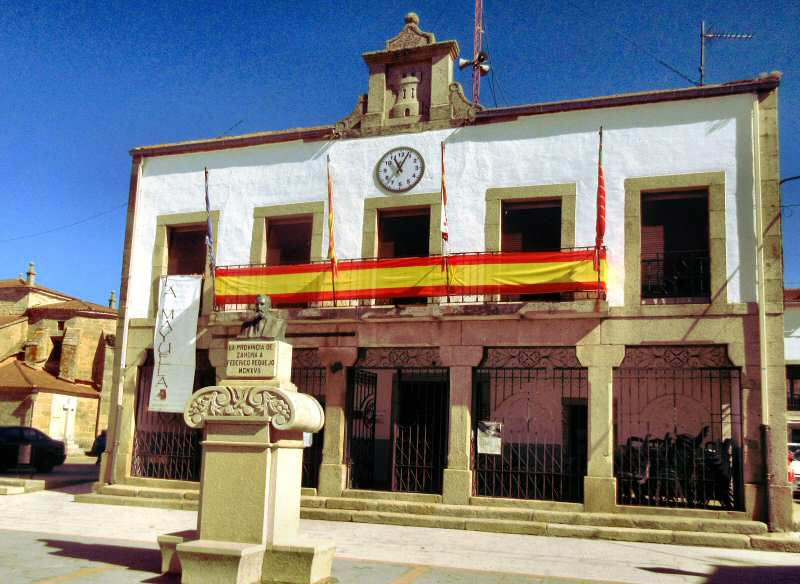

- Coat of arms
- Nickname: Bermillo
- Location in Spain.
- Coordinates: 41°22′0.86″N 6°6′43.51″W
- Country: Spain
- Autonomous community: Castile and León
- Province: Zamora
- Municipality: Sayago

Government
  - Mayor: Norberto Núñez Toribio (PP)

Area
  - Total: 189.55 km^{2} (73.19 sq mi)

Population (2025-01-01)
  - Total: 1,028
  - Density: 5.423/km^{2} (14.05/sq mi)
- Time zone: UTC+1 (CET)
  - Summer (DST): UTC+2 (CEST)

Bermillo de Sayago (Spanish pronunciation: [beɾˈmiʎo ðe saˈʝaɣo]) is a municipality located in the province of Zamora, Castile and León, Spain. According to the 2025 census (INE), the municipality has a population of 1,028 inhabitants. It works as the territorial capital of Sayago, leading this comarca but with no official status. Its central position and the fact of a clearly higher population have given the town this role. Furthermore, the municipalities association Sayagua has its headquarters in Bermillo. This organization is a mancomunidad that supplies services like recycling or water through the comarca of Sayago that could not be afforded by the so-little towns in the area.

Geographically, its landscape is a peneplain, as the rest of Sayago (except Duero canyons, that are relatively far away Bermillo).

== Demography ==
According to the 2009 census (INE), the municipality has a population of 1,259 inhabitants.

== See also ==
- Arribes del Duero Natural Park
- Zamora city
- Zamora province
