= Arribes (wine) =

Coordinates: 41°19′25″N 6°23′00″W

Arribes DOP
- Wine region
- Arribes DO in the provinces of Zamora and Salamanca in the region of Castile and León
- Official name: D.O. Arribes
- Type: Denominación de Origen Protegida (DOP)
- Year established: 2005
- Country: Spain
- Size of planted vineyards: 245 hectares (605 acres)
- No. of wineries: 17
- Wine produced: 697 hectolitres
- Comments: Data for 2016 / 2017

Arribes is a Spanish Denominación de Origen Protegida (DOP) for wines located in the southwest of the province of Zamora and the northwest of the province of Salamanca (Castile and León, Spain), along the border with Portugal on the banks of the River Duero.

In 2002 the area covered by the DOP along with parts of Portugal on the opposite bank was declared a Natural Park, Parque Natural de Arribes del Duero.

== History ==
There are two theories regarding the origins of winemaking in the Arribes region. The first says that it was the ancient Romans who introduced grape-growing and wine-making. The second theory says it could have been the Phoenicians at a much earlier date, making use of their fleets along the Duero and the port of Porto.

In 1998, the area was awarded the category of Vino de la Tierra and on 27 July 2005, it was awarded the higher category of Denominación de Origen.

The name Arribes derives from the Latin ad ripam, which means 'on the banks' (of the river Duero).

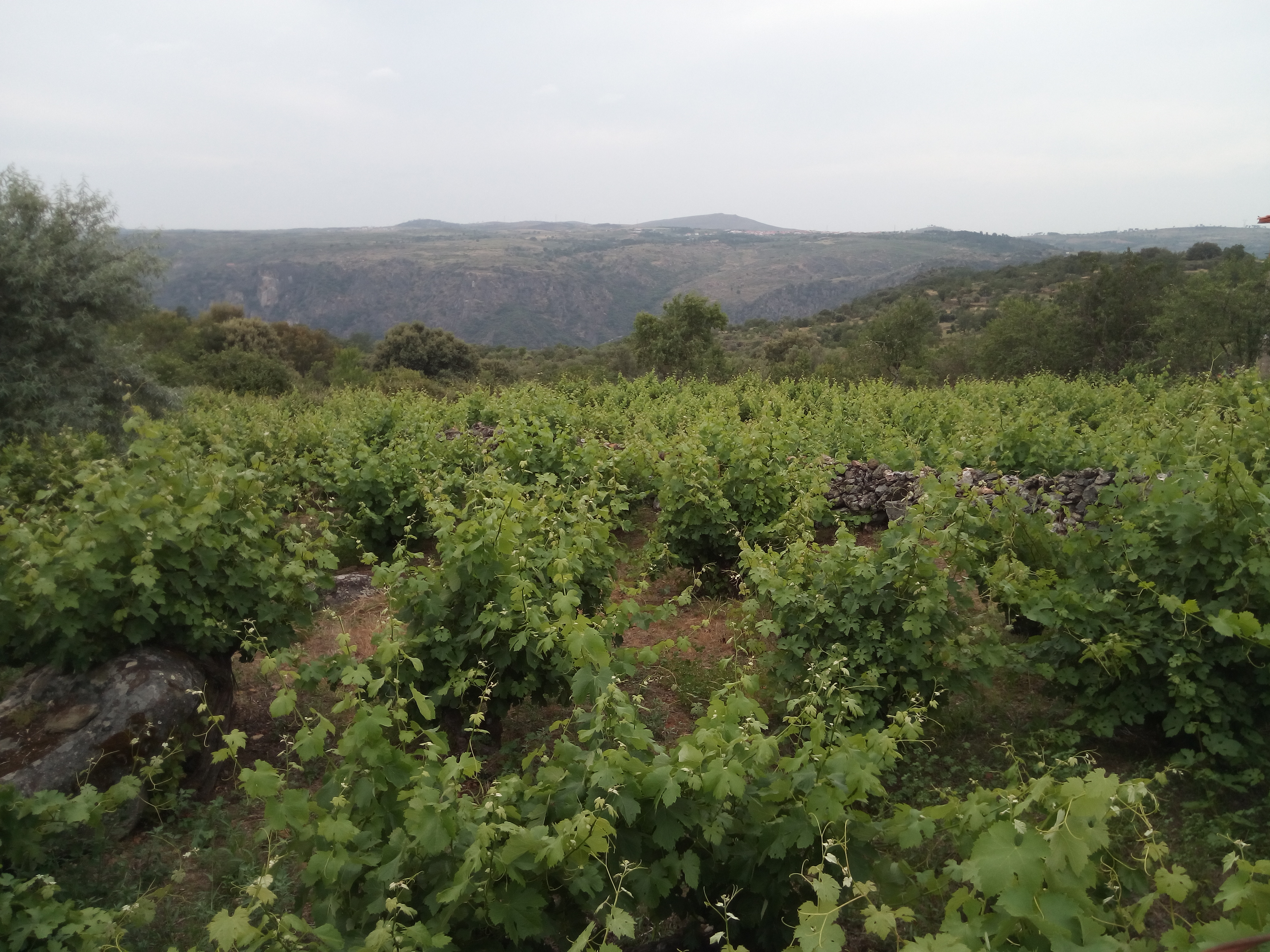
Vineyards in the Arribes DO.

== Climate ==
The area enjoys a Mediterranean climate with Atlantic influences. Rainfall is evenly spread over the year. Summers tend to be warm and dry while winters are mild.

== Soils ==
The soils are not deep, mostly sandy with loose granite and quartz pebbles. There are many rocky outcrops and the soil is generally poor in organic matter.

The subsoil provides good drainage, and an interesting heat regulation mechanism. The presence of slate in the subsoil acts as a heat accumulator during the day and releases it slowly during the night.

== Vineyards ==
The authorized planting density is a minimum of 2,000 vines/hectare; the maximum authorized yield id 10,000 kg/ha for white varieties and 7,000 kg/ha for red varieties.

The vines are mostly old vines (65 years on average) and so are mostly grown as low bushes (en vaso), though recently planted ones tend to be on trellises (en espaldera). Average yield is 3,500 kg/ha, or about 1.5 kg/vine.

== Grape varieties ==
The authorized red varieties are: Tempranillo (known as Tinta Serrana or Tinto Madrid locally), Juan García, Rufete, Garnacha Tinta, Mencía, Bruñal / Albarín Tinto

The authorized white varieties are: Malvasía Castellana / Doña Blanca, Albillo Mayor, Albillo Real, Verdejo.

== Wines produced ==
- Tinto joven (young reds): made mainly with Jaun García, Rufete and Tempranillo
- Tinto Crianza (oak aged reds): at least 6 months in oak, plus 18 months in bottle
- Rosado (rosé): at least 60% Juan García, Rufete and Tempranillo
- Blanco (white): at least 60% Malvasía
