= Argañín =

Place in Castile and León, Spain

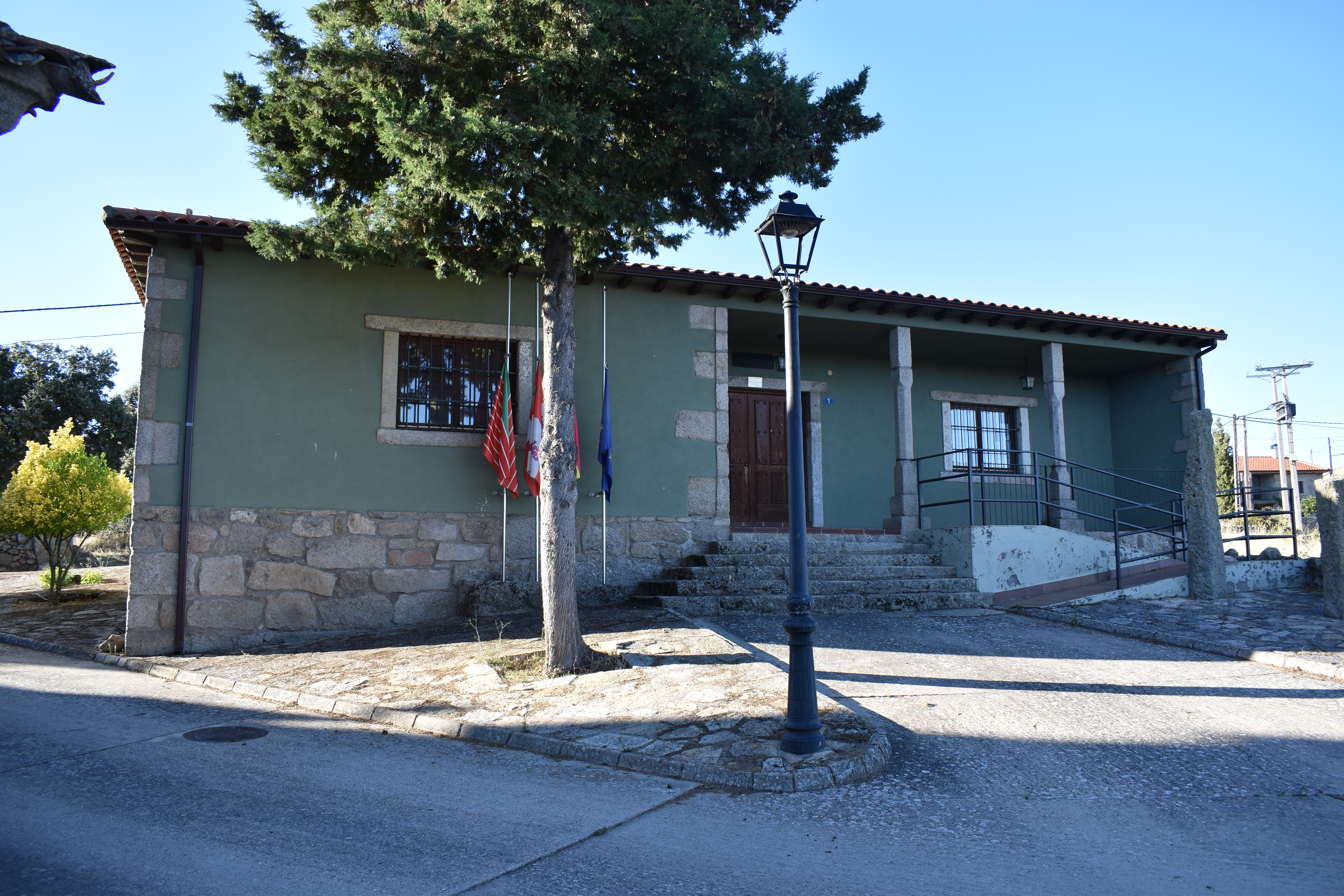
- Town hall

- Location in Spain.
- Coordinates: 41°26′23″N 6°12′37″W
- Country: Spain
- Autonomous community: Castile and León
- Province: Zamora
- Comarca: Sayago

Government
  - Mayor: José Pordomingo Pascual

Area
  - Total: 12.64 km^{2} (4.88 sq mi)

Population (2025-01-01)
  - Total: 79
  - Density: 6.2/km^{2} (16/sq mi)
- Time zone: UTC+1 (CET)
  - Summer (DST): UTC+2 (CEST)

Argañín (Spanish pronunciation: [aɾɣaˈɲin]) is a municipality located in the province of Zamora, Castile and León, Spain.
