= Salce =

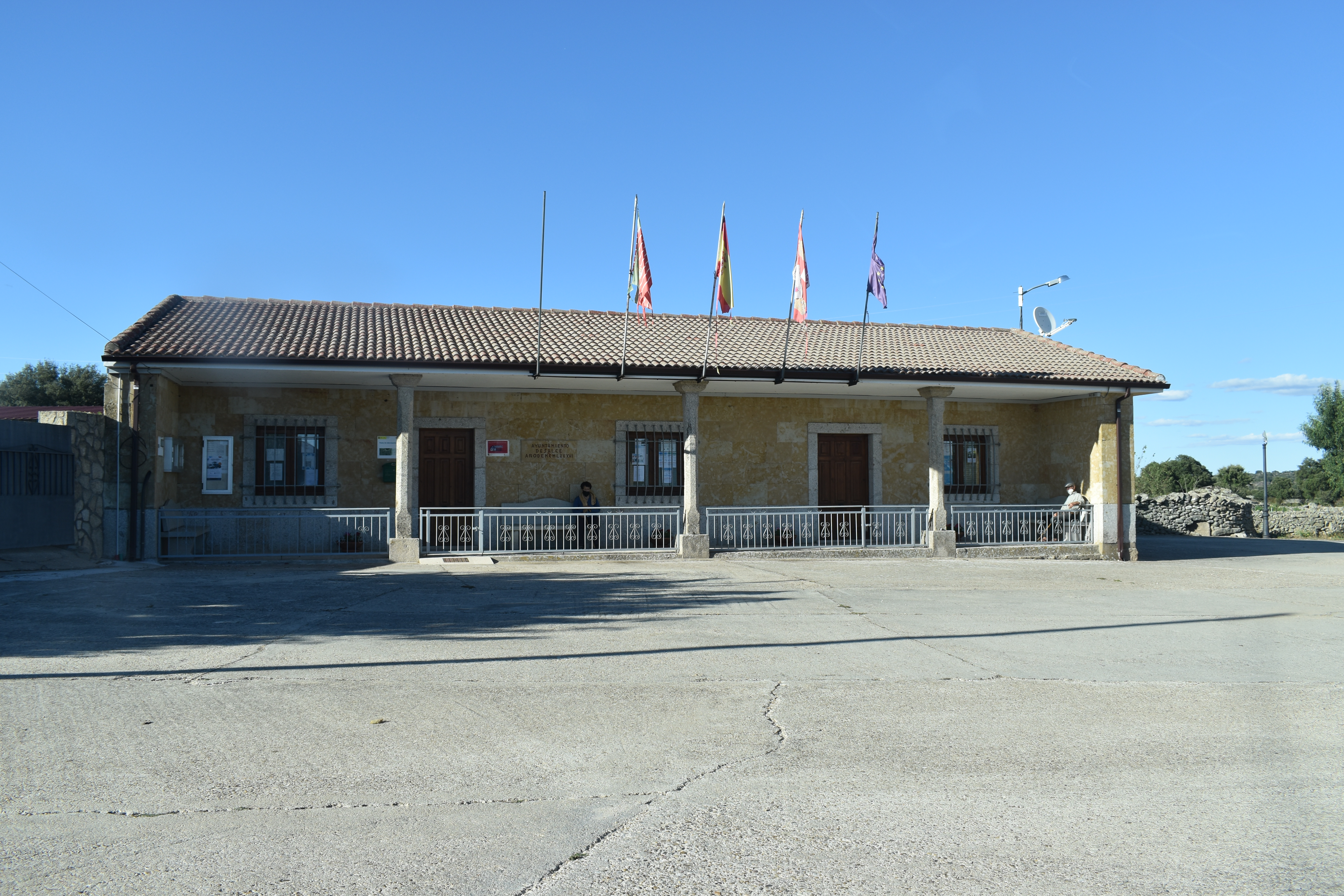
- Town hall

- Flag Coat of arms

- Location in Spain
- Coordinates: 41°16′11″N 6°13′09″W
- Country: Spain
- Autonomous community: Castile and León
- Province: Zamora
- Comarca: Sayago

Area
  - Total: 34 km^{2} (13 sq mi)

Population (2025-01-01)
  - Total: 83
  - Density: 2.4/km^{2} (6.3/sq mi)
- Time zone: UTC+1 (CET)
  - Summer (DST): UTC+2 (CEST)

Salce, also known as Salce de Sayago, is a municipality located in the province of Zamora, Castile and León, Spain. According to the 2004 census (INE), the municipality has a population of 127 inhabitants.

== See also ==
- List of municipalities in Zamora
