= Fariza =

Coordinates: 41°25′N 6°16′W

Fariza, Spain
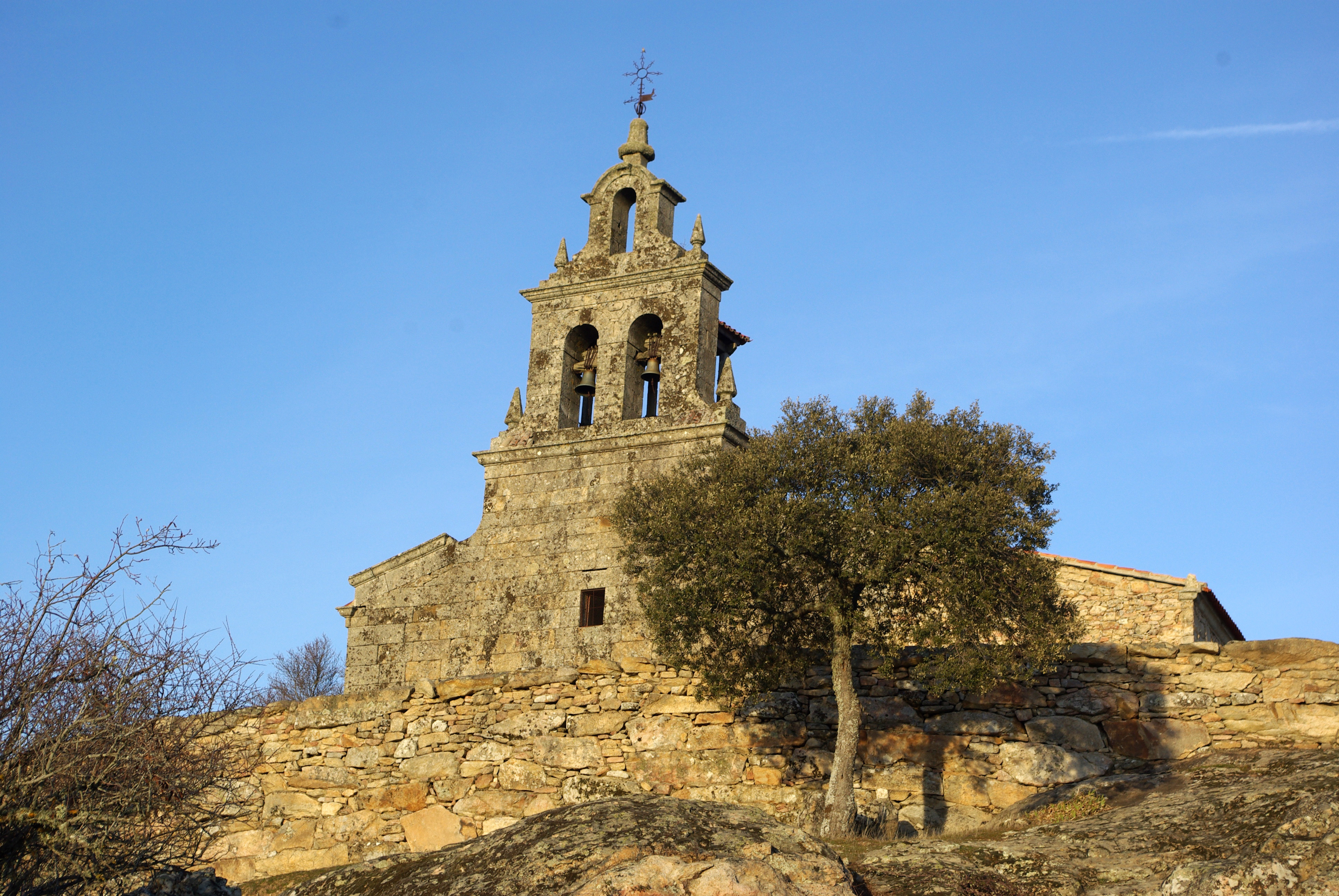

- Flag Coat of arms
- Interactive map of Fariza, Spain
- Country: Spain
- Autonomous community: Castile and León
- Province: Zamora
- Municipality: Fariza

Area
  - Total: 90 km^{2} (35 sq mi)

Population (2025-01-01)
  - Total: 487
  - Density: 5.4/km^{2} (14/sq mi)
- Time zone: UTC+1 (CET)
  - Summer (DST): UTC+2 (CEST)
- Website: www.fariza.es

Fariza is a municipality located in the province of Zamora, Castile and León, Spain. According to the 2009 census (INE), the municipality has a population of 646 inhabitants.

== See also ==
- Arribes del Duero Natural Park
- Zamora city
- Zamora province
