= Roelos de Sayago =

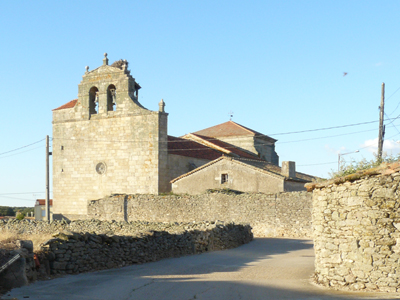

- Flag Coat of arms

- Location in Spain.
- Coordinates: 41°15′9.45″N 6°10′20.67″W
- Country: Spain
- Autonomous community: Castile and León
- Province: Zamora
- Comarca: Sayago

Government
  - Mayor: Porfirio Gallego Herrero.

Area
  - Total: 55 km^{2} (21 sq mi)
- Elevation: 776 m (2,546 ft)

Population (2025-01-01)
  - Total: 133
  - Density: 2.4/km^{2} (6.3/sq mi)
- Demonym: Roelanos
- Website: Official website

Roelos de Sayago is a municipality located in the province of Zamora, Castile and León, Spain. According to the 2009 census (INE), the municipality has a population of 180 inhabitants.
