= Carbellino =

Coordinates: 41°14′N 6°09′W

- Flag Coat of arms
- Interactive map of Carbellino
- Country: Spain
- Autonomous community: Castile and León
- Province: Zamora
- Municipality: Carbellino

Area
  - Total: 32 km^{2} (12 sq mi)

Population (2025-01-01)
  - Total: 174
  - Density: 5.4/km^{2} (14/sq mi)
- Time zone: UTC+1 (CET)
  - Summer (DST): UTC+2 (CEST)

Carbellino is a municipality located in the province of Zamora, Castile and León, Spain. According to the 2009 census (INE), the municipality has a population of 222 inhabitants.

(Information about Carbellino es:Carbellino in Spanish)
