= Fresno de Sayago =

Coordinates: 41°19′N 5°58′W

- Flag Coat of arms
- Interactive map of Fresno de Sayago
- Country: Spain
- Autonomous community: Castile and León
- Province: Zamora
- Municipality: Fresno de Sayago

Area
  - Total: 64 km^{2} (25 sq mi)

Population (2025-01-01)
  - Total: 137
  - Density: 2.1/km^{2} (5.5/sq mi)
- Time zone: UTC+1 (CET)
  - Summer (DST): UTC+2 (CEST)
- Website: Official webpage

Fresno de Sayago is a municipality located in the province of Zamora, Castile and León, Spain. According to the 2009 census (INE), the municipality has a population of 242 inhabitants.
