= Villardiegua de la Ribera =

Place in Castile and León, Spain

Coordinates: 41°32′N 6°11′W

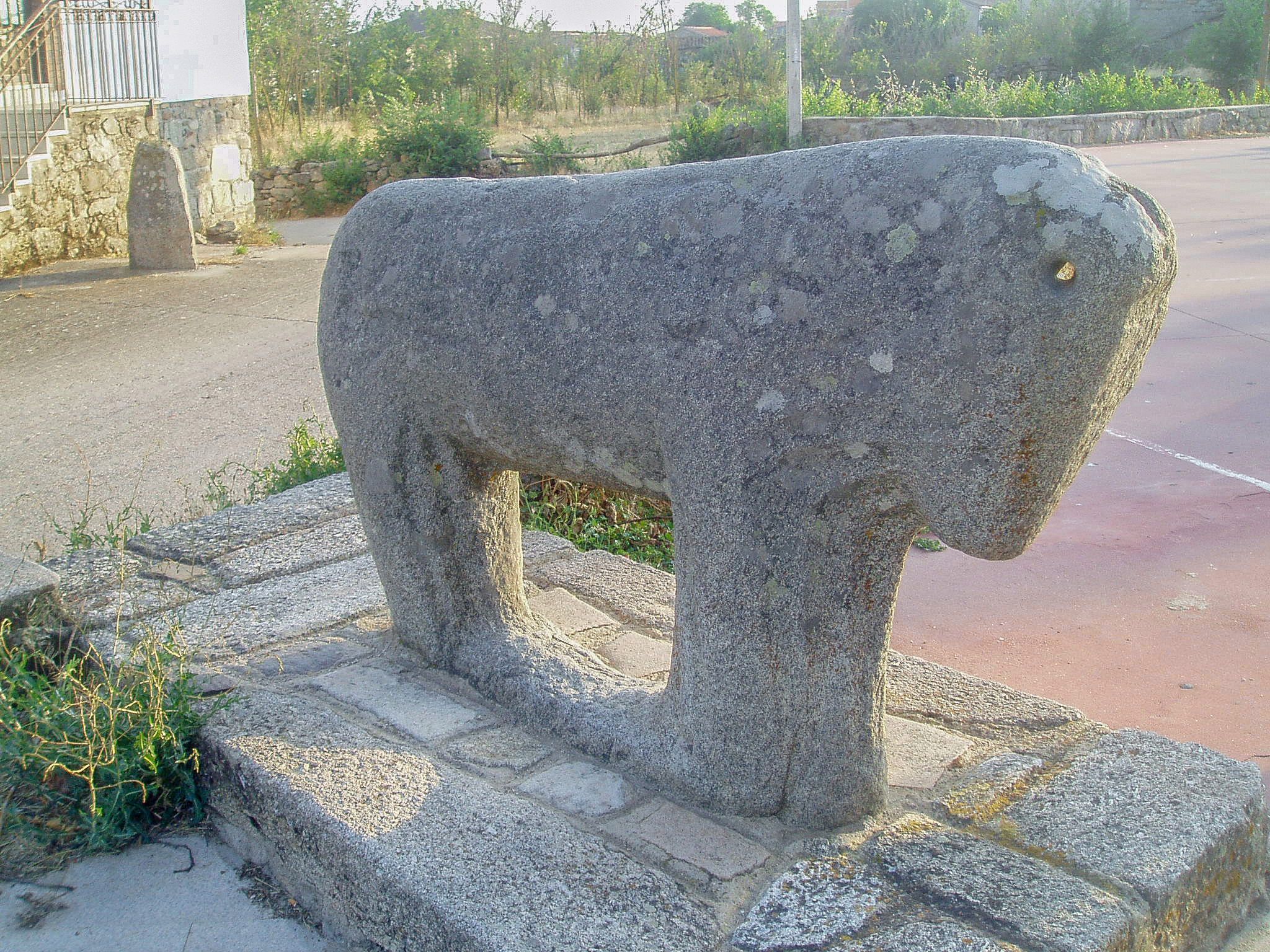

- Flag Coat of arms
- Interactive map of Villardiegua de la Ribera
- Country: Spain
- Autonomous community: Castile and León
- Province: Zamora
- Municipality: Villardiegua de la Ribera

Area
  - Total: 29 km^{2} (11 sq mi)

Population (2025-01-01)
  - Total: 106
  - Density: 3.7/km^{2} (9.5/sq mi)
- Time zone: UTC+1 (CET)
  - Summer (DST): UTC+2 (CEST)

Villardiegua de la Ribera (Spanish pronunciation: [biʎaɾˈðjeɣwa ðe la riˈβeɾa]) is a municipality located in the province of Zamora, Castile and León, Spain. According to the 2004 census (INE), the municipality has a population of 162 inhabitants.
