= Moral de Sayago =

Coordinates: 41°28′N 6°06′W

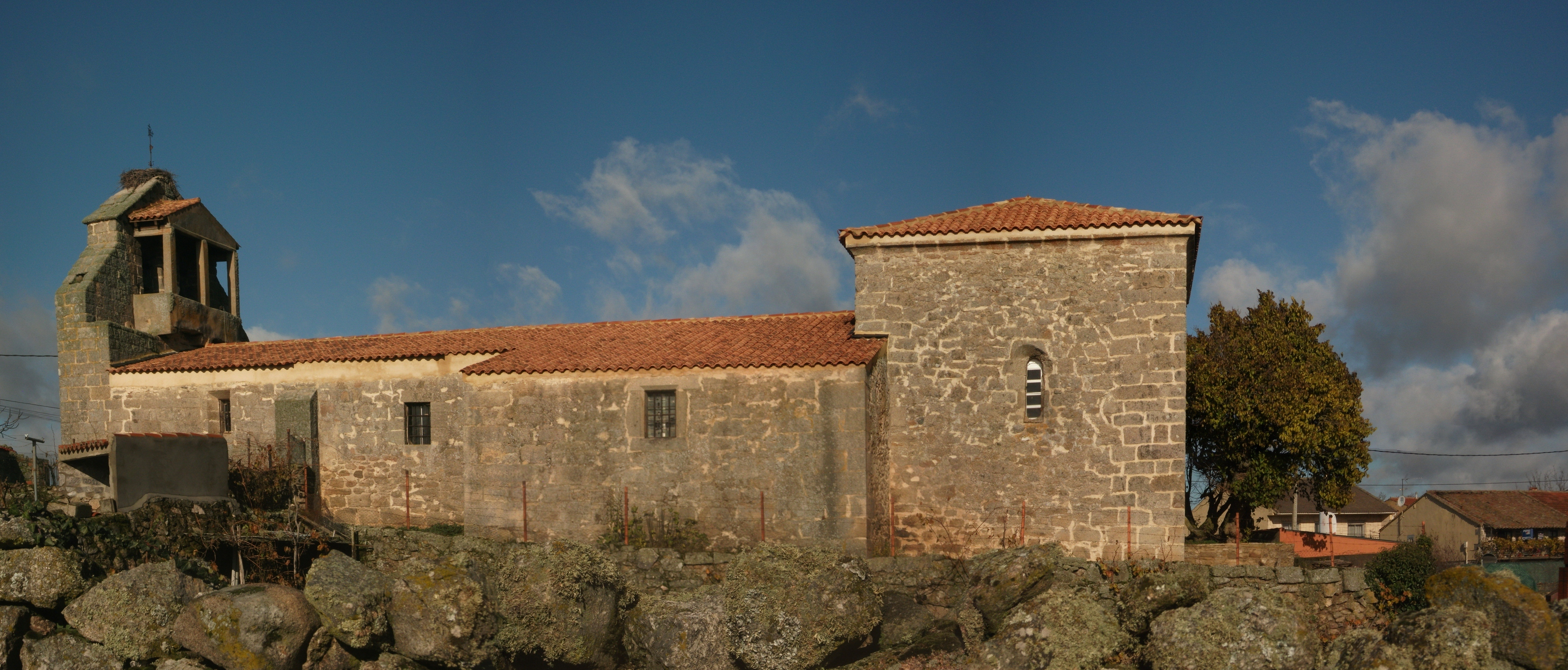

- Flag Coat of arms
- Interactive map of Moral de Sayago
- Country: Spain
- Autonomous community: Castile and León
- Province: Zamora
- Municipality: Moral de Sayago

Area
  - Total: 66 km^{2} (25 sq mi)

Population (2025-01-01)
  - Total: 265
  - Density: 4.0/km^{2} (10/sq mi)
- Time zone: UTC+1 (CET)
  - Summer (DST): UTC+2 (CEST)
- Website: Official website

Moral de Sayago is a municipality located in the province of Zamora, Castile and León, Spain. According to the 2004 census (INE), the municipality has a population of 346 inhabitants.
