= Villar del Buey =

Coordinates: 41°20′N 6°11′W

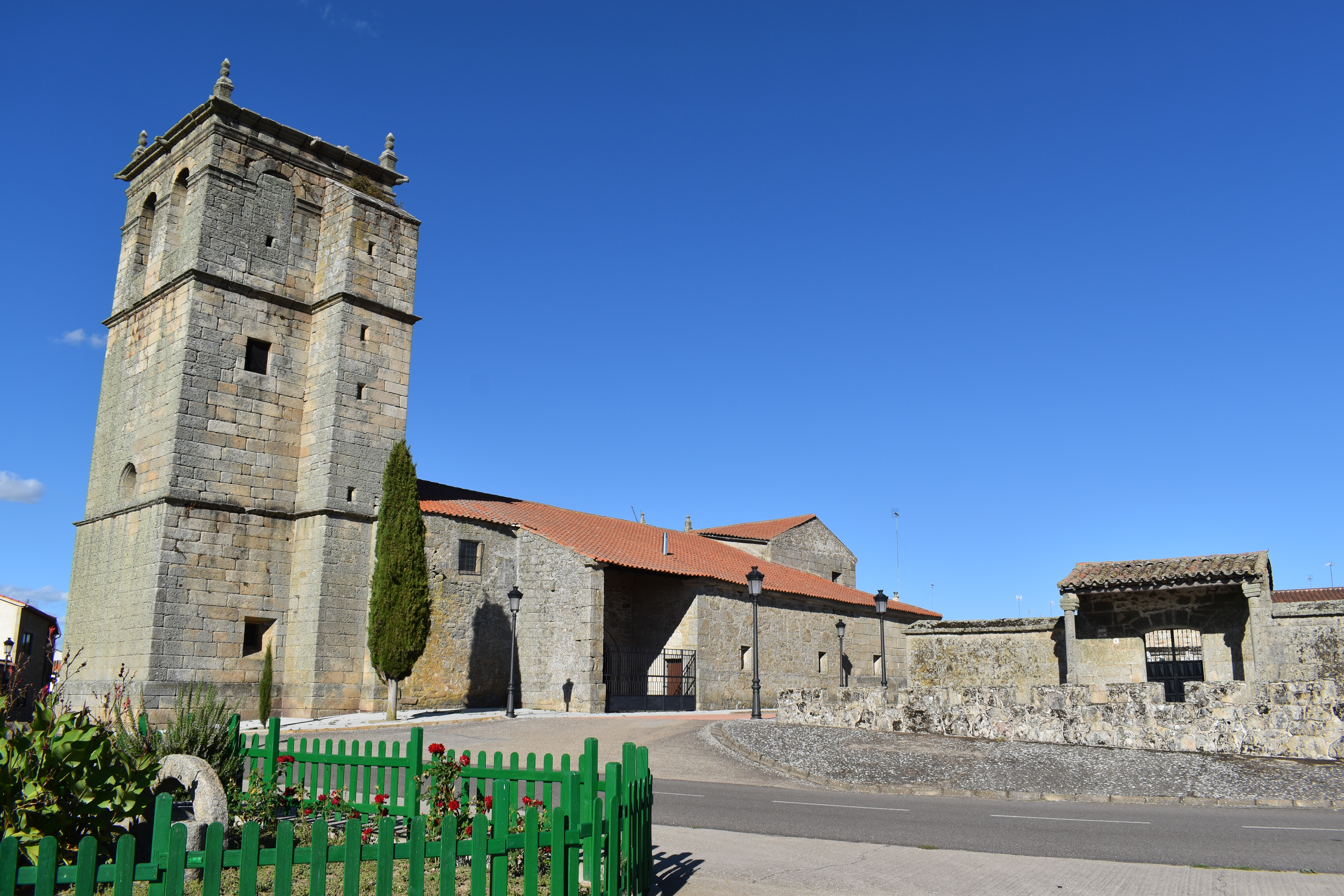
- Church in Villar del Buey

- Flag Coat of arms
- Interactive map of Villar del Buey
- Country: Spain
- Autonomous community: Castile and León
- Province: Zamora
- Municipality: Villar del Buey

Area
  - Total: 134 km^{2} (52 sq mi)

Population (2025-01-01)
  - Total: 483
  - Density: 3.60/km^{2} (9.34/sq mi)
- Time zone: UTC+1 (CET)
  - Summer (DST): UTC+2 (CEST)
- Website: Official website

Villar del Buey (Spanish pronunciation: [biˈʎaɾ ðel ˈβwej]) is a municipality located in the province of Zamora, Castile and León, Spain. According to the 2004 census (INE), the municipality has a population of 801 inhabitants.

The biodiversity of its municipal area has been protected by UNESCO as a cross-border biosphere reserve under the name of Meseta Ibérica by the European Union with the Natura 2000 Network and by the autonomous community of Castilla y León as a natural park, the latter two under the name of Arribes del Duero.
