= Douro International Natural Park =

Protected area in Portugal

- IUCN category V (protected landscape/seascape)
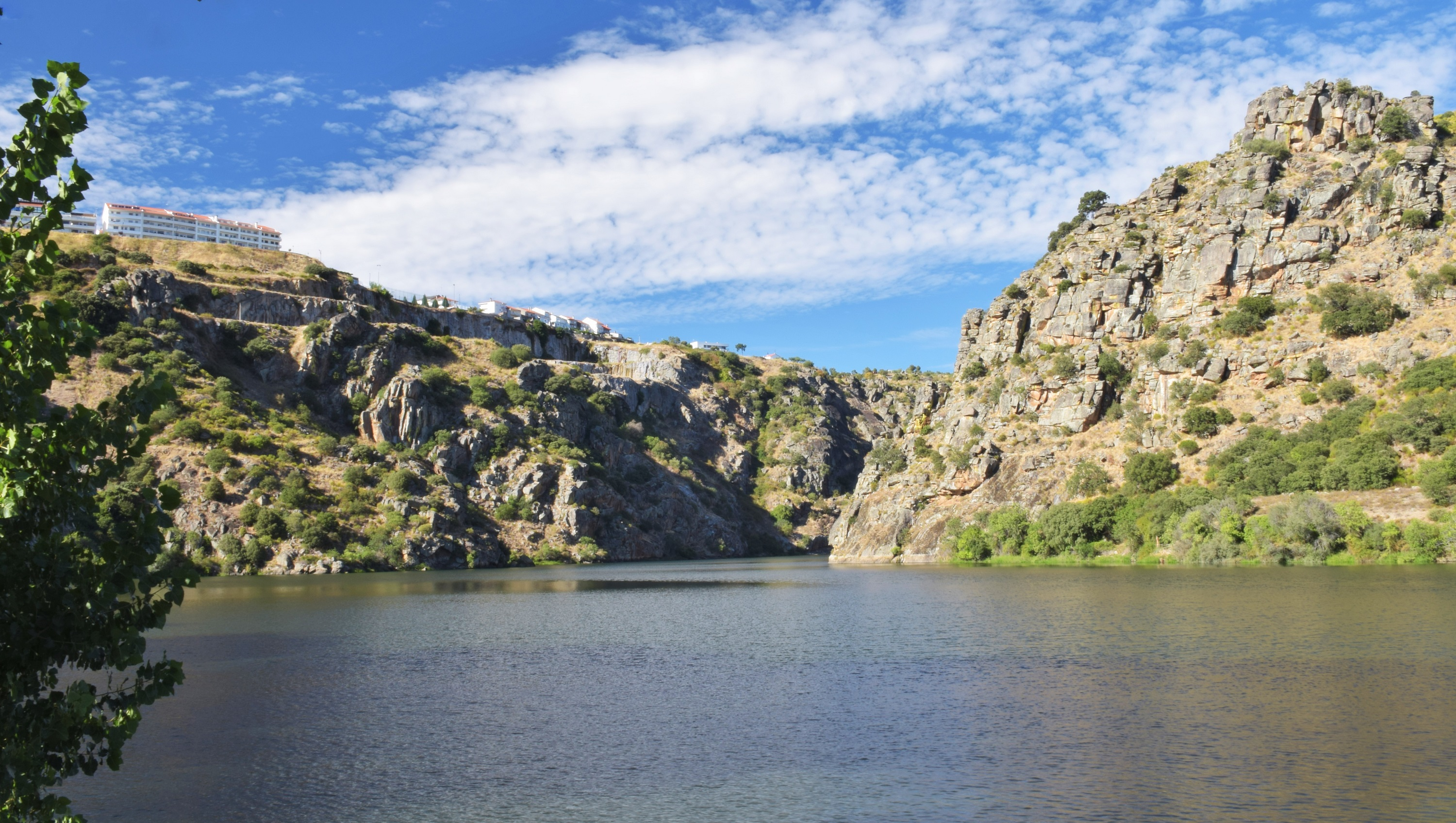
- The Douro near Miranda do Douro
- Interactive map of Douro International Natural Park
- Location: Bragança & Guarda districts, Portugal
- Coordinates: 41°16′00″N 6°38′23″W
- Area: 868.35 km^{2} (335.27 sq mi)
- Created: May 11, 1998
- Governing body: ICNF

The Douro International Natural Park (Portuguese: Parque Natural do Douro Internacional) is a natural park in northeast Portugal. With 868 km^{2} (335 sq mi), it is one of the largest protected areas in the country. It is located in the municipalities of Miranda do Douro, Mogadouro, Freixo de Espada à Cinta and Figueira de Castelo Rodrigo, spanning a lengthy area along the Douro River where it functions as the border between Portugal and Spain (hence "International Douro"). The park also includes the border area of the Águeda River. The park was created to protect the scenic landscape of the region, as well as its flora and fauna.

== See also ==
- Arribes del Duero Natural Park
