= Arribes (geography) =

Arribes (also named arribas or arribanzos) are the banks of the rivers in the southeast of the province of Zamora and the northeast of the province of Salamanca, Castile and León, Spain.

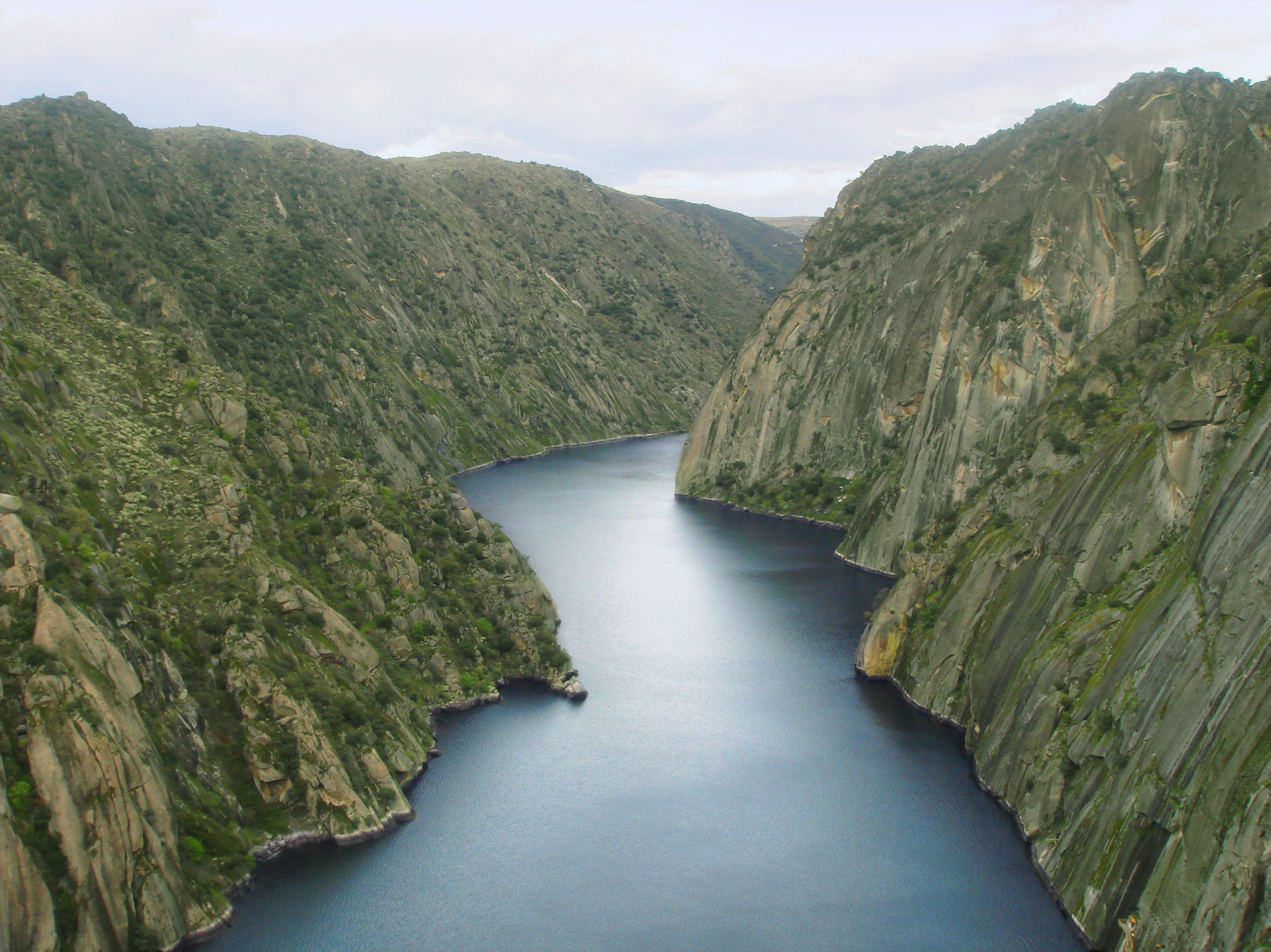
Douro Arribes, near Aldeadávila de la Ribera

There are Águeda Arribes, Douro Arribes, Esla Arribes, Huebra Arribes, Tormes Arribes and Uces Arribes.
