= Arribes del Duero Natural Park =

Arribes del Duero
- IUCN category V (protected landscape/seascape)
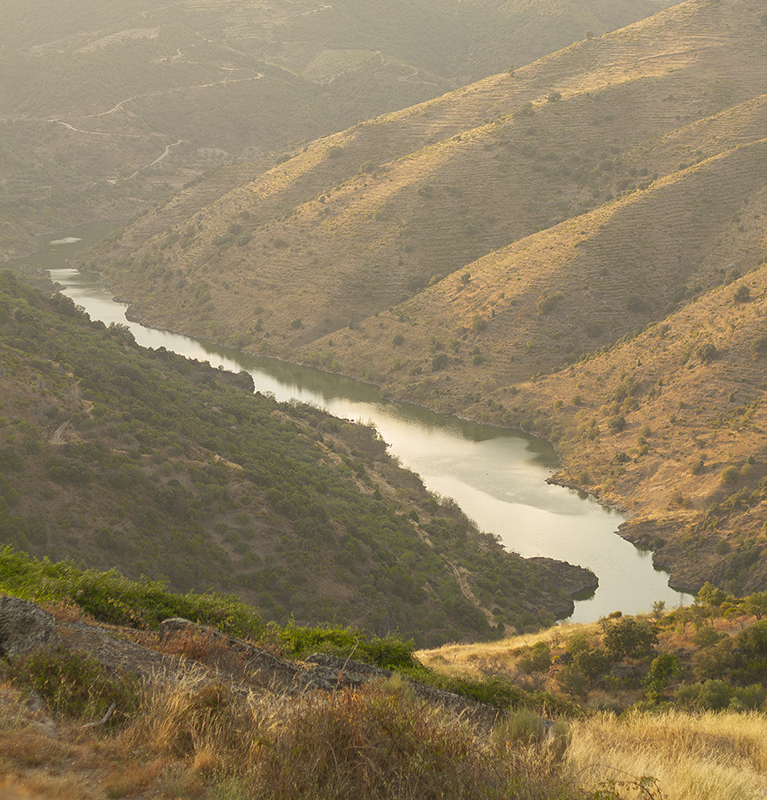
- Interactive map of Arribes del Duero
- Location: Salamanca and Zamora provinces, Castile and León, Spain
- Nearest city: Salamanca or Zamora
- Coordinates: 41°19′25″N 6°23′00″W
- Area: 1,061.05 km^{2} (409.67 sq mi)
- Established: April 11, 2002
- Visitors: 39,540 (in 2010)
- Governing body: Castile and León
- Website: www.patrimonionatural.org/ren.php?espacio_id=6

Arribes del Duero Natural Park is a protected area in western Spain, covering 1,061.05 km^{2} (409.67 sq mi) in the autonomous community of Castile and León. In this area the river Duero forms the national boundary between Spain and Portugal, and the Portuguese side is also protected under the Douro International Natural Park. The most notable characteristics of this natural space are its biodiversity and range of watercourses, which have eroded deep valleys and vertiginous precipices. This landscape is known as Arribes, which is where the reserve name comes from.

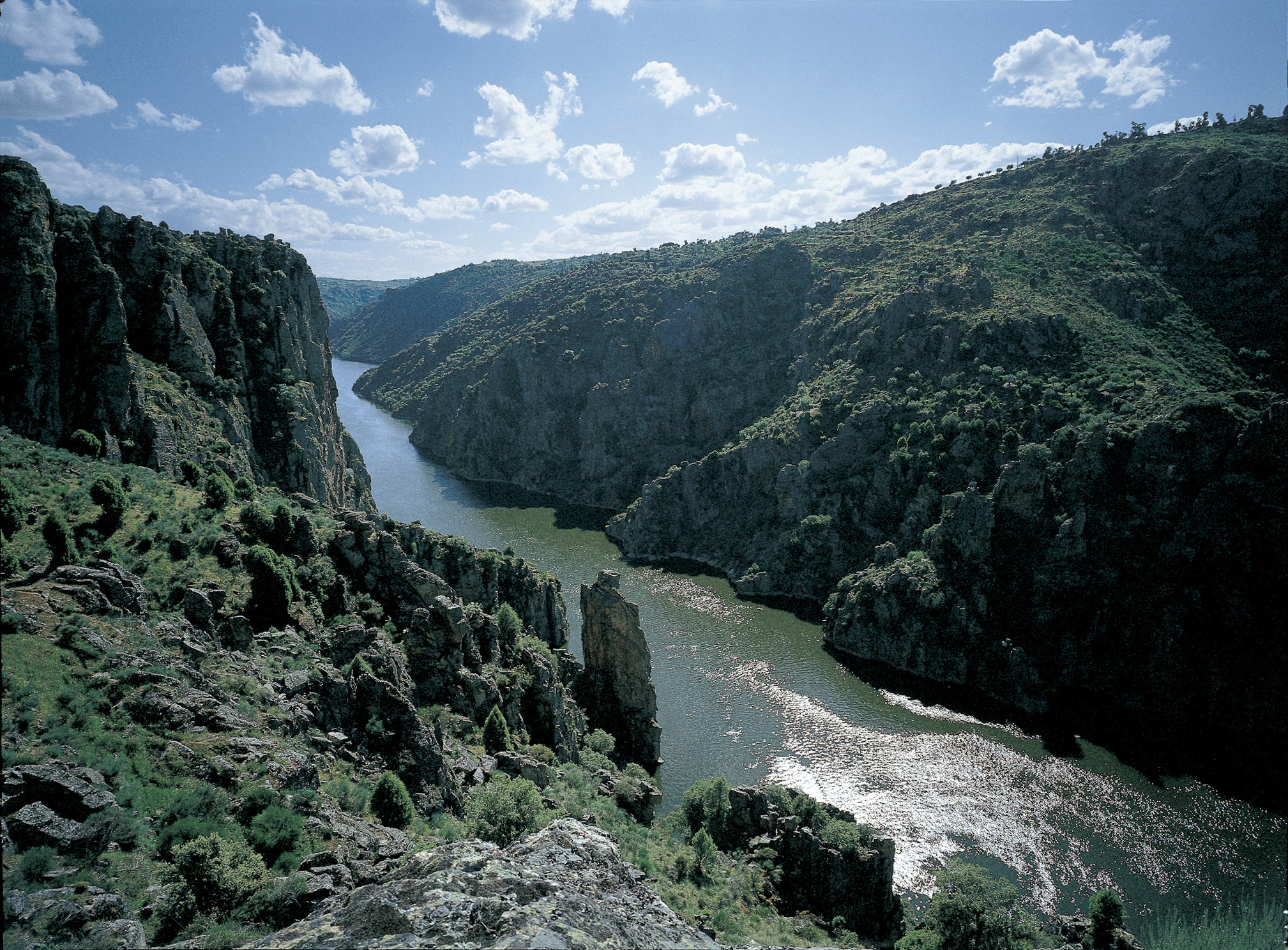
The Douro Natural Park

== Fauna ==
The park is a Special Protection Area, recognised by European Union for birds such as the black stork.

== See also ==
- Douro International Natural Park
- Arribes
- Sayago
