= Ribeira Sacra (DO) =

Denomination of Spanish wine

Coordinates: 42°30′59″N 7°30′58″W

Ribeira Sacra DOP
- Wine region
- Ribeira Sacra DOP in the provinces of Lugo and Ourense, in the region of Galicia
- Official name: C.R.D.O. Ribeira Sacra
- Type: Denominación de Origen Protegida (DOP)
- Year established: 1996
- Country: Spain
- Sub-regions: Amandi, Chantada, Quiroga-Bibei, Ribeiras do Miño, Ribeiras do Sil
- Size of planted vineyards: 1,241 hectares (3,067 acres)
- Varietals produced: Godello, Loureira, Treixadura, Dona Branca, Albariño, Torrontés, Branco Lexítimo, Caíño Branco, Mencía, Brancellao, Merenzao, Sousón, Caíño Tinto, Caíño Longo, Caíño Bravo, Garnacha Tintureira, Mouratón, Tempranillo, Gran Negro
- No. of wineries: 99
- Wine produced: 44,546 hectolitres
- Comments: Data as of 2023

Ribeira Sacra is a Spanish Denominación de Origen Protegida (DOP) (Denominación de Orixe Protexida in Galician) for wines located in the south of the province of Lugo and in the north of the province of Ourense, in Galicia, Spain. It extends over the territories of 20 different municipalities that make up a zone also called Ribeira Sacra, which could be translated as "Sacred Riverbank". Vineyards are planted on the steep slopes of the valleys and canyons of the rivers Miño and Sil. The area acquired official Denominación de Origen status in 1996.

The region is known for red wines produced from Mencía and other grapes such as Merenzao and Brancellao, as well as white wines made from Godello, Albariño and Dona Branca.

== Etymology ==
The term "Rivoira Sacrata" first appeared in the writings of Brother Antonio Yepes, who mentioned the name in his General Chronicle of the Order of Saint Benedict, written at the beginning of the 17th century. Yepes transcribed a section of the founding document of the Monastery of Montederramo which reads "locum qui dicitur Rovoyra Sacrata, qui est in monte de Ramo, territorio Caldelas."

Studies of the original founding document of the Monastery of Montederramo by Galician linguists have revealed that the original term, Rovoyra Sacrata, alluded to a sacred oak grove.

Whether intentionally or by mistake, Yepes transcribed the place name as "Rivoyra Sacrata," which translates to "sacred riverbank", and attributed the term's origins to the multiple monasteries along the Sil river. Later, Enrique Flórez included the erroneous transcription in España Sagrada, teatro geografico-historico de La Iglesia de España, published in the 18th century. The term "Ribeira Sacra" became popularized by contemporary historiography until it was chosen as the name of the wine region.

== History ==
It is generally believed that grape growing and wine production were introduced to the area by the Romans.

Many monasteries and hermitages were founded in the region during the early Middle Ages between the 6th and 12th centuries. The monks expanded plantations of vineyards for their own consumption and maintained the grape-growing and winemaking tradition. The most important monasteries are:

- San Pedro de Bembibre
- Taboada dos Freires
- San Paio de Diomondi
- Santo Estevo de Ribas de Miño
- Santa María de Pesqueiras
- Montederramo
- San Pedro de Rocas
- Ferreira de Pantón
- San Paio de Abeleda
- Santa Cristina de Ribas de Sil
- San Estevo de Ribas de Sil

Viticulture in the region continued with very little change from the medieval period until the 19th century. The sale of Church properties starting in 1836 led to the disappearance of many monastic communities and the abandonment of vineyards. In the mid-19th century, the phylloxera epidemic arrived in the area and destroyed a large number of vineyards over the course of nearly fifty years. In the early 20th century wine production began to recover after the introduction of rootstock grafting. However, widespread emigration left the region with a labor shortage, slowing the recovery process and leaving many vineyards in a state of abandonment. For much of the 20th century, wine made in the region was limited to self-consumption or distributed in bulk to local bars and taverns.

In 1993, the designation Viño da Terra Ribeira Sacra was approved, providing a legal framework to regulate wine production.

In 1996, the region was elevated to Denominación de Origen status by an order from the Department of Agriculture, Livestock and Forestry of the Xunta de Galicia.

== Geography ==
The area is divided into five subzones. The subzones and the municipalities they contained have been listed below (the subzones are split by parish and so some municipalities are listed more than once):

1. Chantada: Portomarín, Taboada, Chantada, Carballedo, Peroxa
2. Amandi: Sober, Monforte de Lemos
3. Ribeiras do Miño: Paradela, O Saviñao, Pantón, Sober, Monforte de Lemos
4. Ribeiras do Sil: A Teixeira, Parada de Sil, Castro Caldelas, Nogueira de Ramuín
5. Quiroga-Bibei: Monforte de Lemos, Pobra do Brollón, Quiroga, Ribas de Sil, Pobra de Trives, Manzaneda, San Xoán de Río

In the Miño Valley, soils are mainly granitic, much like the granite soils prevalent throughout western Galicia. They are well-draining with sandy and silty textures.

In the Sil Valleys, soils show characteristics of eastern Galicia, with an abundance of clay and slate. These soils also provide good drainage and favor prolonged ripening of grapes, since they absorb the sun's heat during the day and release it at night.

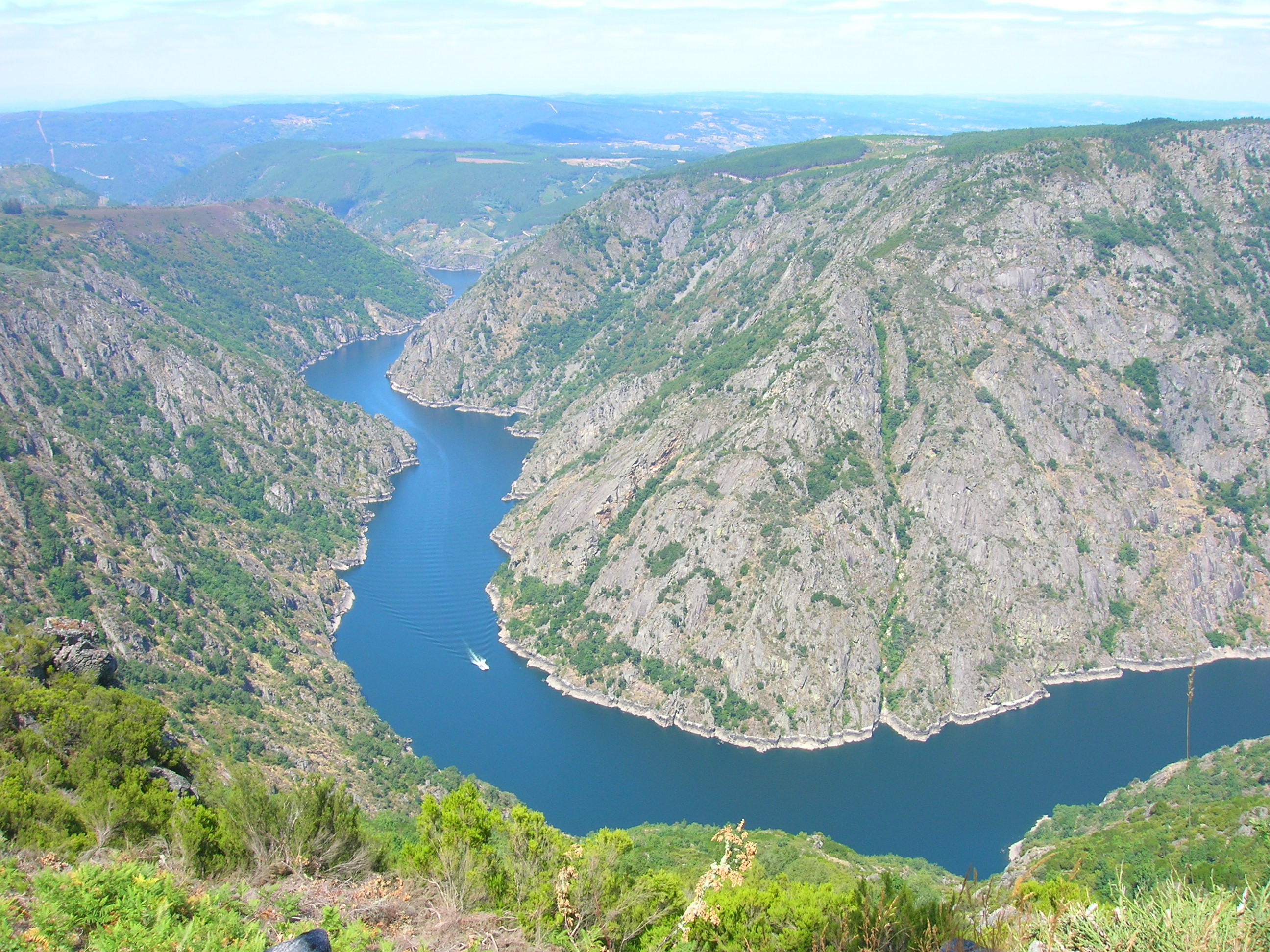
View over river Sil canyon

== Climate ==
The climate in Ribeira Sacra DO is more continental than Atlantic, and has long hot summers and cool autumns.

The Miño Valley has rainfall around 900 mm per year and an average temperature of 14 °C. The Sil Valley has rainfall around 700 mm and an average temperature of 13 °C. In general, the Miño area has a more Atlantic climate whereas the Sil area is more continental.

== Grapes ==
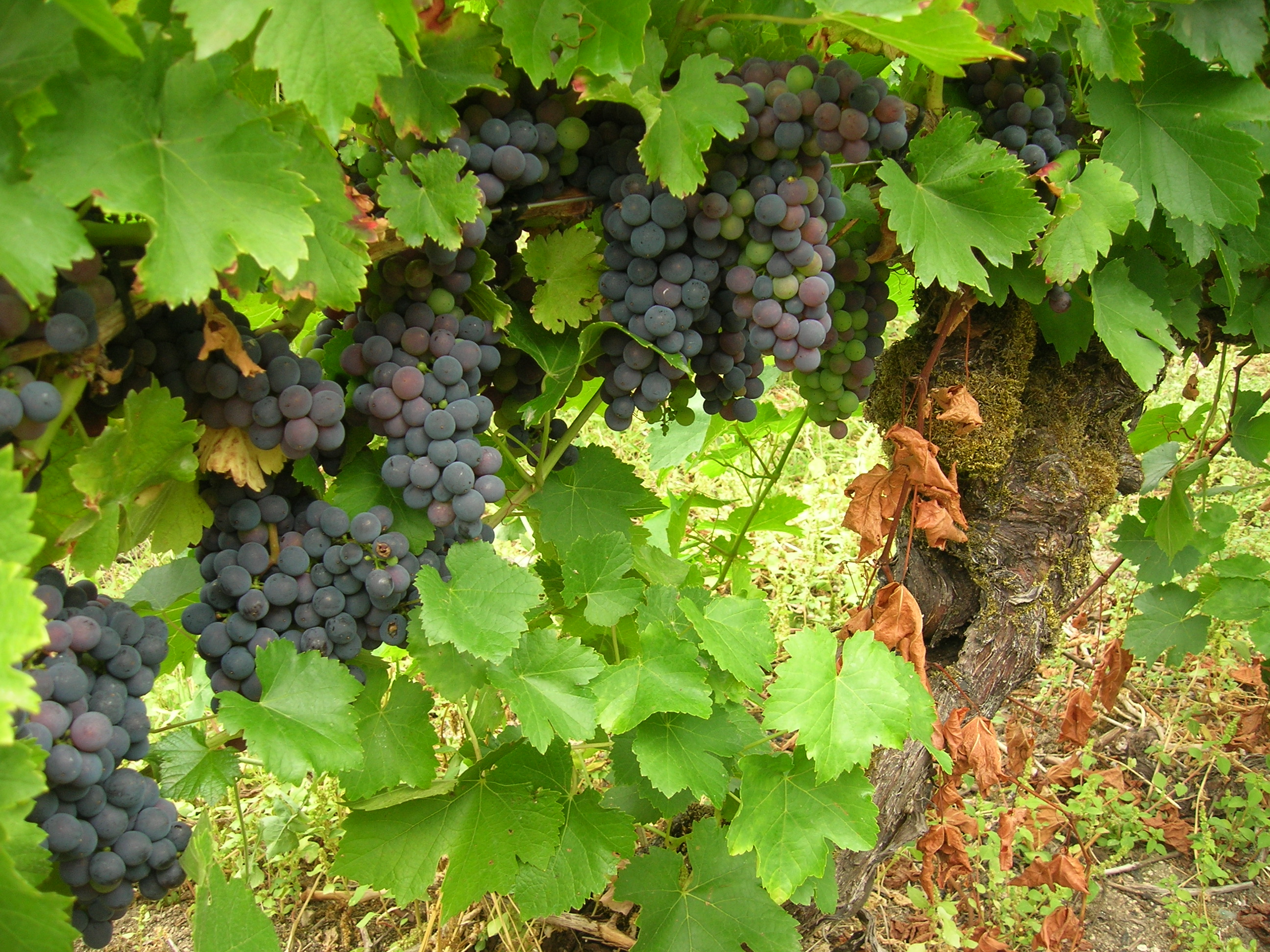
Mencía grape growing in Ribeira Sacra

The principal red varieties are: Mencía, Brancellao, Merenzao, Sousón, and Caiño Tinto; also authorized are Garnacha tintorera, Tempranillo, and Mouratón.

The principal white varieties are: Godello, Loureira, Treixadura, Dona Branca, Albariño, Torrontés, Branco Lexítimo, and Caíño Branco.

Vineyards are planted on terraces known as socalcos in the narrow river canyons. The steep slopes make mechanization impossible; activities in the vineyard such as pruning and harvesting are carried out by hand. Access is often very difficult and sometimes only possible from the river.

== Viticulture ==
Most of the vineyards in Ribeira Sacra are planted along the Miño, Sil, Cabe and Bibei river canyons, with slopes that can reach nearly 100% gradient in some points. With the exception of elevators installed in some vineyards to move crates of grapes, all work in the vineyard is done by hand. The difficulties posed by the terrain and the near absence of mechanization in the vineyard make Ribeira Sacra an example of what is known as heroic viticulture.

Since 2011, CERVIM (Center for Research, Environmental Sustainability and Advancement of Mountain Viticulture) has had a specific seal that defines heroic viticulture under the following parameters:

- Vineyards cultivated at altitudes higher than 500 meters (1,600 feet) above sea level
- Vineyards cultivated on slopes exceeding 30% grade
- Vineyards cultivated on terraces and/or embankments
- Vineyards cultivated on small islands

== See also ==
- Galician wine
- Spanish wine
