= Barbanza e Iria =

Barbanza e Iria VdlT
- Wine region
- Barbanza e Iria VdlT in the provinces of A Coruña and Pontevedra in the region of Galicia
- Type: Vino de la Tierra
- Country: Spain

Barbanza e Iria is a Spanish geographical indication for Vino de la Tierra wines located in the autonomous region of Galicia. Vino de la Tierra is one step below the mainstream Denominación de Origen indication on the Spanish wine quality ladder.

The area covered by this geographical indication comprises the municipalities of Catoira, Valga, Pontecesures, Padrón, Dodro, Rianxo, Boiro, A Pobra do Caramiñal, Ribeira and some parts of Porto do Son and Lousame, located in the provinces of A Coruña and Pontevedra, in Galicia, Spain.

It acquired its Vino de la Tierra status in 2007.

== Grape varieties ==
Red: Mencía, Caiño tinto, Brancellao, Espadeiro, Loureira Tinta and Sousón White: Albariño, Godello, Palomino, Caíño blanco, Loureira, Treixadura and Torrontés
