= Galician wine =

Wine made in Galicia, Spain

Galicia in northwest Spain.

Galician wine (Galician: Viño galego or Viño de Galicia) is Spanish wine made in the autonomous community of Galicia in the northwestern Spain. It includes wine made in the provinces of A Coruña, Ourense, Pontevedra and Lugo. Within Galicia are five Denominacións de Orixe (DO): Monterrei, Rías Baixas, Ribeira Sacra, Ribeiro and Valdeorras. In recent years, the region has seen a resurgence in its wine industry led by the international acclaim being received by the Rías Baixas region for its Albariño wines.

== Climate and geography ==
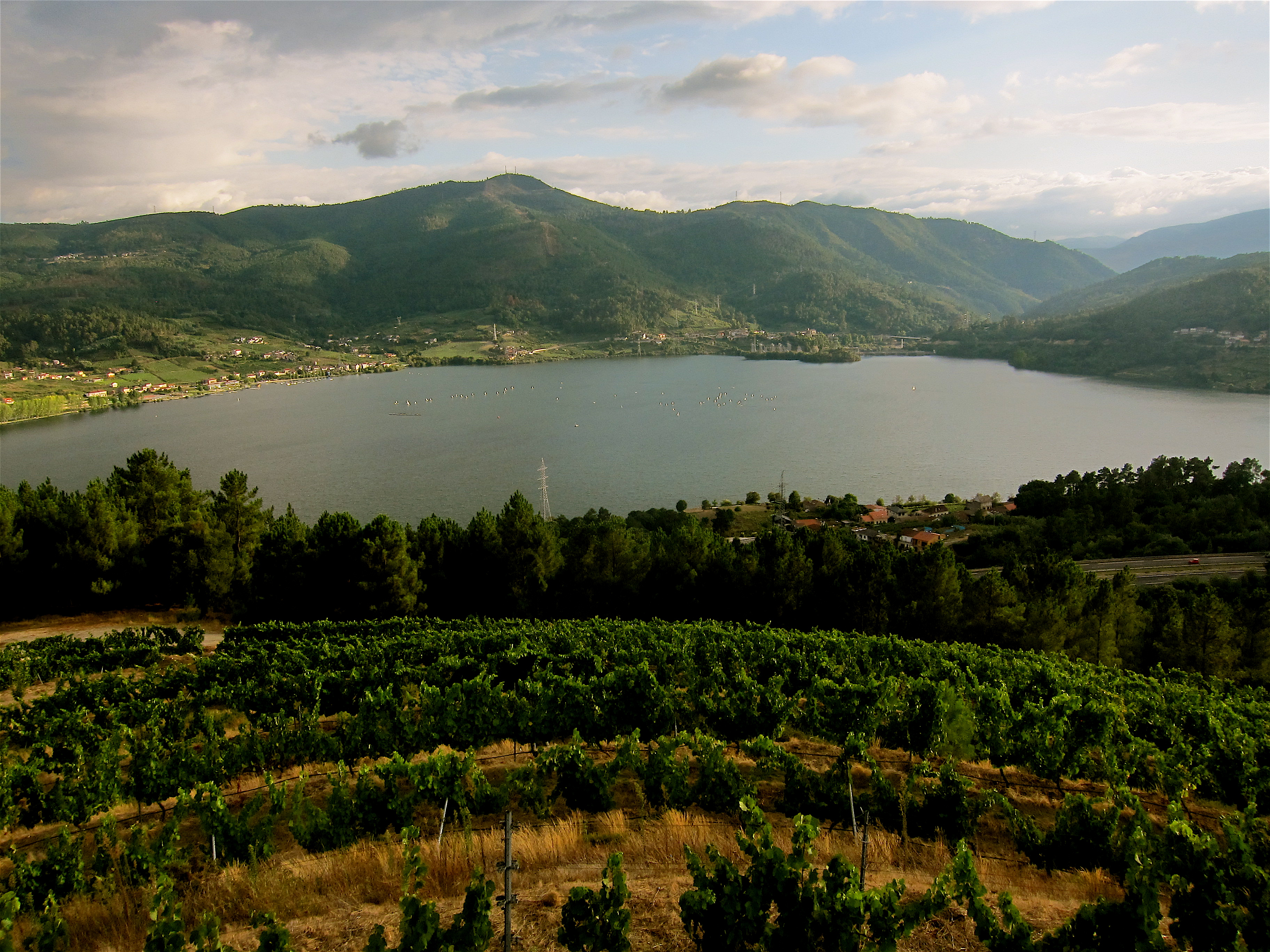
Vineyards in Galicia are influenced by the high humidity and close proximity to the Atlantic.

Located along Spain's Atlantic coast, Galicia has a very wet climate with average rainfall of more than 50 inches (1,300 mm) a year. The region receives over 2,000 hours of sunshine, which helps offset the effects of the high rainfall. The Serra dos Ancares mountain range forms the border with Castile and León to the east, and the Miño river forms part of the region's border with Portugal to the south. The region's close proximity to Portugal and virtual isolation from the rest of Spain has had a marked influence on the style of wines from Galicia with many of them being closer in style to Portuguese wines than to other Spanish wines.

The vineyard soils in the region range from granite in the western half of Galicia to slate in the eastern half.

== History ==
The first written evidence of viticulture in Galicia comes from Strabo, who reported that the vine was planted in Galicia by the Romans when they conquered the region. The Muslims who landed in Spain in the 8th century were unable to occupy the northern part of Spain. Galicia’s isolation meant it only experienced episodic raids and the Muslim establishment was very weak, with all occupation ending around 760 CE. Christian monks led the recovery of Galicia's vineyards beginning in the 8th century. During the medieval period, cultivation spread until much of Galicia was under vine, with plantations in the Miño River valley and that of its tributary, the Sil; the Rías Baixas, the estuaries of A Coruña, and the northern coast.

During the same period, the wines produced in the modern-day Ribeiro wine region became famous throughout Galicia and were exported throughout Spain and Europe, reaching France, Portugal, Italy, and especially Great Britain. From the port cities of Pontevedra, Vigo, Baiona, and A Coruña, Ribeiro wine was transported to Brittany, Flanders, and England. When trade with England declined in the 18th century, Ribeiro experienced a wave of emigration. Many Galicians went south to Portugal, where they were a large part of the labor force that developed the terraced vineyards in the Douro region.

In the 19th century, Galicia was affected by the successive crises of downy mildew, powdery mildew, and phylloxera. The cost of purchasing equipment like bellows for spraying sulfur and Bordeaux mixture was prohibitive to many small wine growers and caused widespread abandonment of vineyards and emigration to Galicia’s coastal regions and the Americas. After phylloxera, new grapes like Mencía began to be widely planted, and many traditional grape varieties were also replaced with other varieties like Palomino and Garnacha Tintorera.

Throughout the 20th century, Galician wines were mainly produced in small quantities for self-consumption or transported in bulk to cities like Santiago de Compostela or A Coruña. The 1932 Estatuto del Vino granted Denominación de Origen status to Ribeiro and Valdeorras among other regions in Spain, in an attempt to recover the prestige of the best Spanish wines in the exterior market. After the Spanish Civil War, the Franco government advocated for the creation of cooperatives. The first cooperative winery was founded in Leiro, in the Ribeiro wine region in 1953.

Spain’s entry into the European Economic Community in 1986 saw European subsidies used to modernize many wineries with new technologies such as stainless steel tanks and allowed greater control of production and quality. Since the early 1980s, Galicia has built a global reputation for aromatic, crisp white wines, many of which are made from the Albariño grape. Many large winery groups from outside Galicia have also purchased wineries and vineyards in regions like Rías Baixas, Ribeiro, and Valdeorras. These larger wineries coexist with cooperative wineries and smaller family wineries.

== Viticulture and wines ==
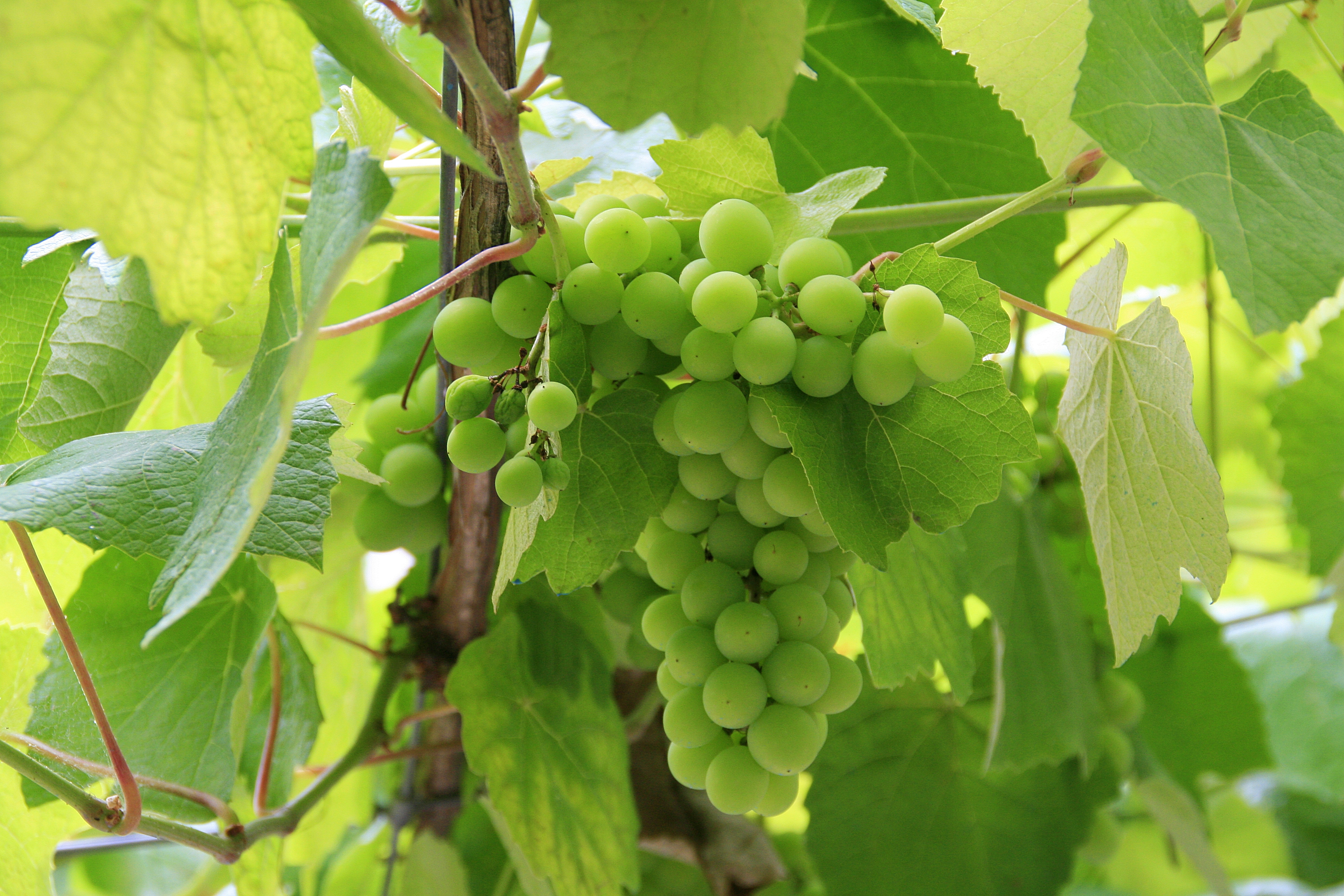
Albariño is widely grown throughout Galicia but particularly in the Rías Baixas DO.

The region of Galicia has shown itself to be quite successful in harvesting grapes and regularly produces some of the highest yields in Europe, averaging 5.7 tons per acre (100 hl/ha). The majority of the area's vineyards are found to the south of the region in the provinces of Ourense and Pontevedra, though there are some significant plantings in Lugo to the east. The regions closer to the Miño river often produce blended wines of Albariño, Loureira and Caiño blanca. More inland the white wines are often blends of Torrontés and Treixadura. There are also white wines dominated by the Godello grape. The light red wines of the region are primarily made from the Mencía grape.

Around 137 hectares (340 acres) of the Southwest France wine grape Camaraou noir (known in Galicia as Espadeiro) is grown here and often blended with Mencía and Caiño tinto.

== Wine regions ==
=== Monterrei ===
The Monterrei DO is found at the southern end of Galicia on the border with Portugal. The region was first granted provisional DO status in the early 1980s but lost the designation as Spanish authorities determined that the producers of Monterrei were not committed to upgrading their estates and improving wine quality. Spurred on by this event, the producers in Monterrei began modernizing their vineyards and wineries with the region regaining full DO status in 1994.

The main wine grapes of Monterrei are Alicante, Doña blanca, Godello, Gran negro, Mencía, Mouratón and Palomino. The wine industry here is currently dominated by bulk wine production.

=== Rías Baixas ===
The Rias Baixas is the most well known region of Galicia and produces some of Spain's most sought after dry white wines based on the Albariño grape. While wines have been produced in this region for some time, exports of the wine to other areas of Europe didn't begin till 16th century and was kept at a steady pace till the phylloxera epidemic devastated the region's vineyards. At the turn of the 20th century many of the region's vineyards were replanted with low quality hybrid vines and some plantings of the Sherry grape Palomino that didn't produce as well in the cooler climate of Rías Baixas. In the 1970s growers began to replant native varieties like Albariño. Throughout the region 12 grape varieties are permitted, including the red wine grapes of Mencía and Espadeiro, but Albariño accounts for 90% of the region's production.

The vineyard soils of the area are granite based and ideally situated for the damp maritime climate of the area. Despite the reputation for high yields in other parts of Galicia, Rías Baixas keeps the yield of its Albariño plantings low in order to produce concentrated fruity and fragrant wine. The wines are often a minimum alcohol content of 12% and are rarely produced in a style other than dry.

Other grapes grown in Rías Baixas include Brancellao, Caiño tinto, Caiño blanca, Loureira, Loureira Tinta, Sousón, Torrontés and Treixadura.

Rías Baixas (DO) is the Galician DO that exports most bottles of wine.

=== Ribeira Sacra ===
The Ribeira Sacra was granted DO status in 1996 and for most of the late 20th century and early 2000s the majority of the wine produced here was made from the Mencía grape with limited white wine production coming from the Godello and Albariño grape. However, by the late 2000s, Palomino was the most widely planted grape in the region though Mencía still has a significant presence producing what wine expert Tom Stevenson calls "promising reds". Stevenson also notes that on the steep, terraced vineyards of Ribeira Sacra that Albariño has the potential to produce the most exciting wine.

Other wine grapes grown in the Ribeira Sacra DO include Brancellao, Caiño tinto, Caiño blanca, Doña blanca, Espadeiro, Ferrón, Garnacha, Loureira, Loureira Tinta, Merenzao, Negrada, Sousón and Torrontés.

=== Ribeiro ===
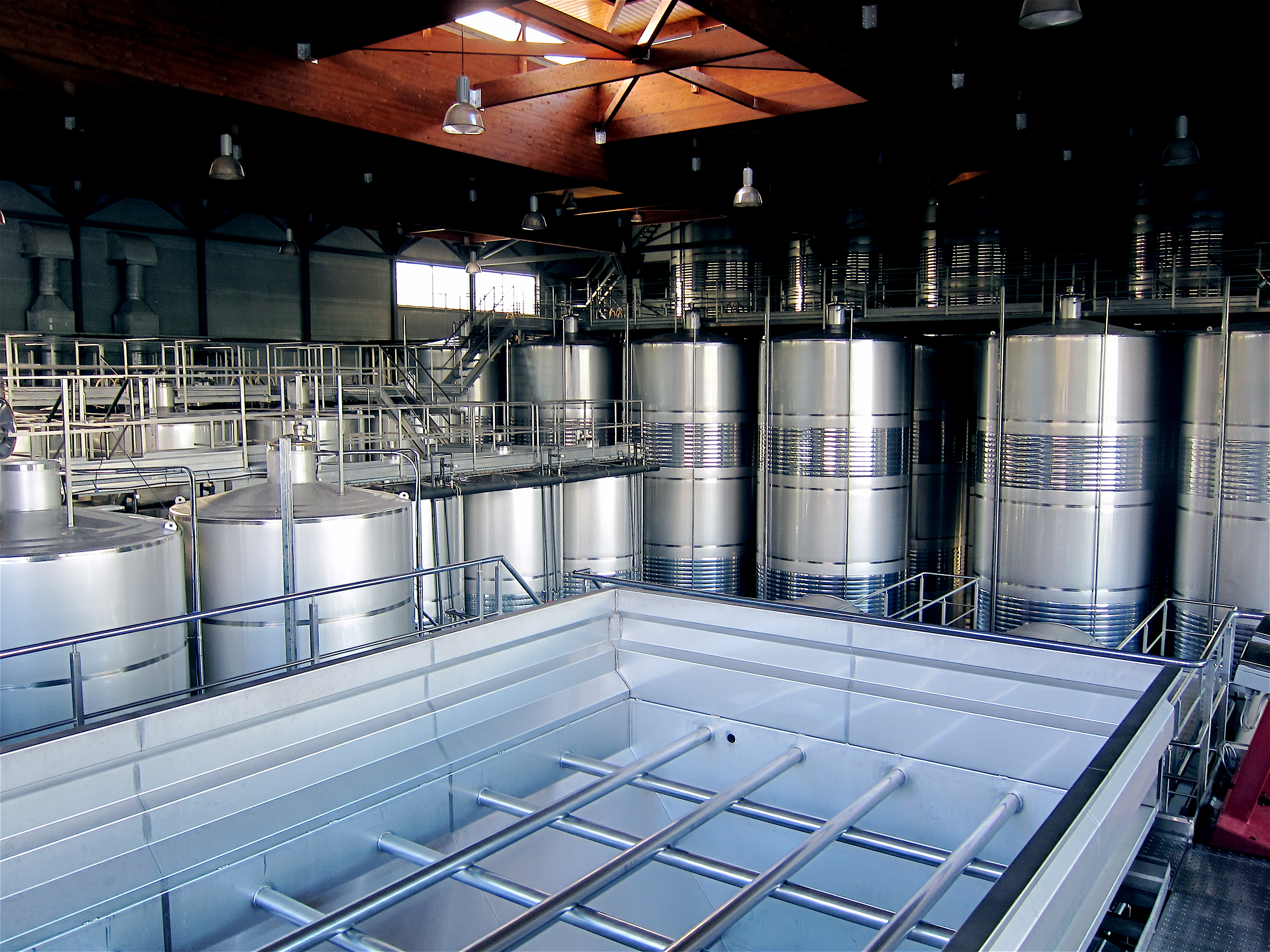
A large co-op winery in Ribeiro.

The Ribeiro DO (which means "river banks" in Galician) is located along the Miño river and its tributaries. It received its DO status in 1957. In the 16th and 17th century, Ribeiro wine was often exported to England and Italy but suffered the same damages as Rías Baixas did during the phylloxera epidemic. However, growers were quicker to turn away from the low quality hybrid plantings and back to the native Torrontés, Treixadura and Lado varieties. These grapes produce crisp, aromatic white wines. The area's red wine production is centered on the Garnacha Tintorera which produces dark colored but light bodied wines.

Due to the similar climates and Atlantic influence, many of the wines of Ribeiro often share a style with the Portuguese wines from the nearby Vinho Verde region though wine expert Tom Stevenson notes that Ribeiro wines are often fruitier and more aromatic.

Other grapes grown in the Ribeiro region include Albariño, Brancellao, Caiño tinto, Caiño blanca, Ferrón, Garnacha, Godello, Jerez, Loureira, Mencía, Sousón Tempranillo, Torronté, Treixadura and Viura.

=== Valdeorras ===
The Valdeorras DO is the easternmost wine region of Galicia that is dominated by the red Garnacha Tintorera and the white Palomino grape. Many of the vineyards are planted in terraces on the steep slate hillsides that flank the Sil river. Prior to the phylloxera epidemic of the 19th century, the indigenous Godello vine was heavily planted and is only just recently starting to make a comeback in the region. The Mencía grape is also starting to gain ground due to the fruity and easy drinking red wines that it produces.

Other grapes grown in the Valdeorras region include Doña blanca, Godello, Gran negro, Lado, María Ardoña, Mencía, Merenzao and Palomino.
