= Ribeiro (DO) =

Spanish wine region

Coordinates: 42°17′N 8°08′W

Ribeiro DOP
- Wine region
- Ribeiro DO in the province of Ourense in the region of Galicia
- Official name: C.R.D.O. Ribeiro
- Type: Denominación de Origen Protegida (DOP)
- Year established: 1932
- Country: Spain
- Size of planted vineyards: 1,281 hectares (3,165 acres)
- Grapes produced: Treixadura, Torrontés, Godello, Lado, Caíño Branco, Loureiro, Albariño, Palomino, Albillo, Caíño Tinto, Caíño Bravo, Caíño Longo, Ferrón, Sousón, Mencía, Brancellao, Garnacha Tintorera, Tempranillo
- No. of wineries: 102
- Wine produced: 6,990,825 liters
- Comments: Data as of 2023

Ribeiro is a Spanish Denominación de Origen Protegida (DOP) (Denominación de Orixe Protexida in Galician) for wines located in the northwest of the province of Ourense (Galicia, Spain), in the valleys formed by the Avia, Miño, and Arnoia rivers. It extends over the territories of nine municipalities in their entirety and includes parishes in five others.

== History ==
The first mention of viticulture in Ribeiro comes from the writings of Strabo in the 2nd century BCE. Ancient stone wine presses dating from that period further prove the prevalence of winemaking during this period.

After the fall of the Roman Empire, little is known about winemaking in the Ribeiro until the medieval period, when Christian monks founded several important monasteries in the Ribeiro region. These monks expanded viticulture to supply local monasteries with wine, and the monasteries became the main drivers of viticulture in the region, encouraging the plantation of vineyards through feudal contracts. In addition to the monasteries, aristocratic families of large and medium-sized landowners also acquired vineyards in the region beginning in the 11th century.

Wine from Ribeiro became one of the most prized commodities in medieval Galicia, evidenced by the approval of a decree from 1133 listing the prices of foodstuffs sold in Santiago de Compostela which listed Ribeiro wine as the most expensive commodity. A few centuries later, Ribeiro wine was exported to the rest of Spain as well as Europe, with the English as the main customers outside the Iberian Peninsula.

By the 15th and 16th centuries, wine was Ribeiro's main export and was traded throughout Spain and Europe, reaching France, Portugal, Italy, and especially Great Britain. From the port cities of Pontevedra, Vigo, Baiona, and A Coruña, Ribeiro wine was transported to Brittany, Flanders, and especially England.

Amid this success, attempts to pass off lesser-quality wine as Ribeiro became more frequent. To guarantee the quality of the wines being sold, the Ordinances of Ribadavia (1579) were written to codify wine-growing areas and aspects related to wine production and sales. This document is considered as a precedent for modern appellations of origin and is recognized by the WIPO (World Intellectual Property Organization) as the first precursor to a geographical indication in Spanish law.

In the 19th century, the successive crises of powdery mildew, downy mildew, and phylloxera devastated the region. After the phylloxera epidemic ended, much of the region was replanted to disease-resistant and highly productive varieties like Palomino and Garnacha Tintoreira, to the detriment of the native varieties.

In 1932, Ribeiro became one of the first official Denominaciones de Origen in Spain with the passage of the Estatuto del Vino. Wine production during most of the 20th century was mostly limited to bulk wine made from Palomino and Garnacha Tintorera. In 1956, the Regulatory Council for D.O. Ribeiro was approved by the Ministry of Agriculture. Later a second regulation was published in 1976, which was modified in 2004, to include Viño Tostado as a protected product based on its historical production. Since the 1980s, Ribeiro has slowly recovered local grapes, recovering and creating new plantations through vineyard reconversion and restructuring programs financed by the Xunta de Galicia.

== Soils ==
Most of Ribeiro's soils are granitic, with sandy loam textures. One of the most characteristic soils of the region is a type of decomposed granite known in Galician as sábrego. The region also has shale- and schist-based soils, as well as soils developed from sedimentary materials with more loamy textures.

Ribeiro has seen intense vineyard cultivation since ancient times. Many vineyards are planted on terraces called socalcos which reduce slopes and facilitate cultivation.Most soils in Ribeiro are poor in organic matter and acidic, but vineyard soils often differ significantly from natural soils, since man has been cultivating them for generations.

== Climate ==
Ribeiro is located in a transitional zone of Galicia, with characteristics of a Mediterranean climate softened by the Atlantic influence due to its short distance from the ocean. Mountain ranges to the west and north of the wine region protect it from winds and rain from the Atlantic via the Foehn effect, increasing the continental character of Ribeiro's climate and increasing diurnal shift, which preserves freshness and encourages phenolic ripening.

Meanwhile, the maritime influence of Atlantic winds which enter Ribeiro via the Miño River creates a greater Atlantic character as the elevation rises, limiting grape cultivation to approximately 450 meters above sea level.

Average annual temperatures are 14.5 °C and average annual rainfall is 950mm. The vines receive a maximum of around 1900 hours of sunlight per year.

== Grapes ==
Principal white grape varieties include: Treixadura, Torrontés, Godello, Lado, Caíño Branco, Loureiro, and Albariño.

Principal red grape varieties include: Caíño Tinto, Caíño Bravo, Caíño Longo, Ferrón, Sousón, Mencía, and Brancellao.

Other permitted grape varieties include: Palomino, Albillo, Garnacha Tintureira, and Tempranillo.

== Wines ==
Ribeiro produces white, red, and sweet wines made from native varieties. Traditionally, wines were made from blends of different grapes, although in recent years the Consejo Regulador has promoted single-variety wines made from Treixadura.

White wines make up 90% of production, and are usually young wines made from a blend of Treixadura and other permitted white grape varieties. They are characterized by high acidity, ABV between 9 and 13%, and aromas of ripe and fresh fruits, floral notes, honey, and aromatic herbs.

Red wines represent around 9% of production and are characterized by aromas of red and black fruits, floral notes of violets, licorice, and spices.

Viño Tostado is a sweet wine obtained from grapes which are dried for three months, pressed, fermented, and aged in oak or cherry wood vats for at least six months and bottle-aged for at least three months.

== See also ==
- Galician wine
- Spanish wine
