= Colleiteiro =

Galicia in northwest Spain

Colleiteiro refers to a particular type of boutique winery in Galician, which is characterized by producing less than 60,000 liters of wine per year, only from their own grapes.

The Colleiteiro, a traditional figure of the Galicia (Spain) countryside, it has evolved when it comes to make their wines, keeping alive the tradition while combining it with the latest technologies in winemaking, all the Colleiteiros' wine are estate-bottled. In most of the Colleiteiro's wineries, it is the owner of the winery who is the responsible for the entire production cycle, from taking care of the vineyard, including winemaking for this reason the almost all of the Colleiteiro's wines are signature wines.

== Features ==
A Colleiteiro can only produce wine from grapes grown therefore, he can not buy grapes or bulk wine to increase its production.

A Colleiteiro can not produce more than 60,000 liters of wine a year.

A Colleiteiro can sell their grapes and/or wine to other wineries, and/or sell the wine bottled under its own brand.

== Legislation ==
The decree 4/2007 by which the geographical quality of the food sector and its regulatory boards, published in the Official Journal of Galicia on January 29, 2007 reflects the following are regulated: "In the designations of origin where there is a specific census that collects Colleiteiro figure as a small producer that transforms their own production, they may have a separate and distinct representation of the sectors identified in the preceding paragraphs without incurring breakage of parity, given his dual capacity as growers and processors. In this case, the growers will not vote in the same census of winemakers and wineries."

== The Colleiteiro in the Ribeiro ==
Currently only the Ribeiro (DO), the oldest DO of Galicia (Spain), collects Colleiteiro figure in their statutes. In Article 17, paragraph 1, Winery Records reads: On the Winery Records will enroll all those who, located in the production area, exercise one of the activities of processing, storage and/or bottling of wines from wineries registered and eligible to use the designation of origin Ribeiro (DO). That must meet all the requirements set these rules. Within this registration will underreporting with wineries grower, understood as such those that produce less than 600 hl of wine per year, from grapes homegrown.

In the harvest 2020 there were 56 Colleiteiros enrolled in the Ribeiro (DO), Video about the Colleiteiros do Ribeiro
