= Vinho Verde =

Type of Portuguese wine

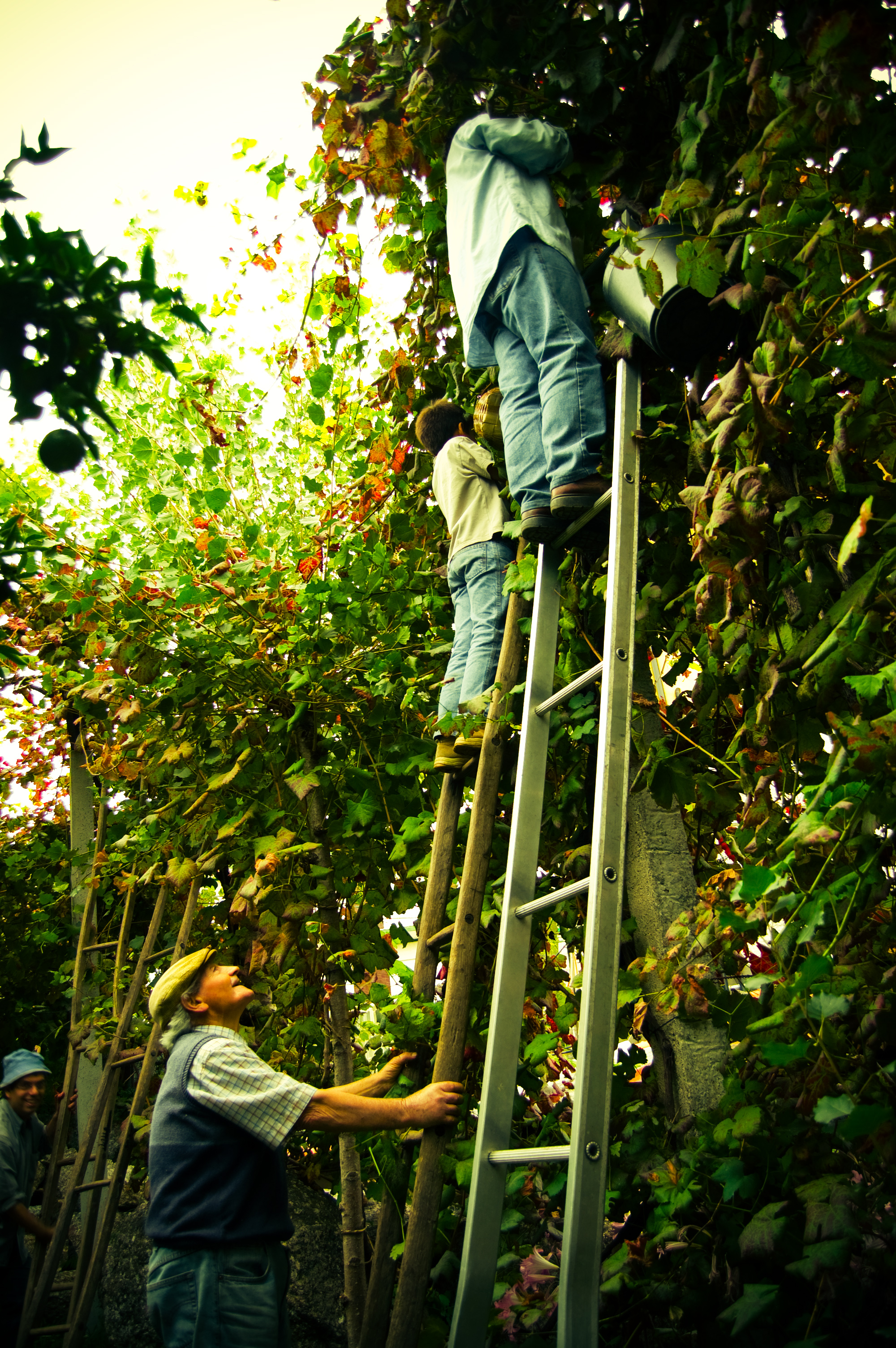
Vinho Verde traditional harvest using ladders to pick grapes from vines trellised on high pergolas ("vinha de enforcado"), Guimarães, Portugal (2007)

Vinho Verde (European Portuguese: [ˈviɲu ˈveɾðɨ]; lit. 'green wine', translated as young wine) is a young Portuguese wine from the DOC (origin protected) "Vinho Verde" region in the far north of Portugal, which includes the original 1908 Minho Province plus adjacent areas to the south.

Vinho Verde has no specified grape variety. The name means green wine, which translates as young wine, with wine being released three to six months after the grapes are harvested. Wines may be red, white or rosé, and they are usually consumed soon after bottling. A Vinho Verde can also be a sparkling, a Late Harvest or even brandy. In its early years of production, the slight effervesce of the wine came from malolactic fermentation taking place in the bottle. In winemaking, this is usually considered a wine fault but Vinho Verde producers found that consumers liked the slightly fizzy nature. However, the wines had to be packaged in opaque bottles to hide the unseemly turbidity and sediment that the "in-bottle MLF" produced. Today, most Vinho Verde producers no longer follow this practice with the slight sparkle being added by artificial carbonation.

The region is characterized by its many small growers, which numbered around 19,000 as of 2014. Many of these growers used to train their vines high off the ground, up trees, fences, and even telephone poles so that they could cultivate vegetable crops below the vines that their families may use as a food source.

== Styles ==
The majority of the wines classified as Vinho Verde are white, but the region is also known for the production of red and rosé wines. The white Vinho Verde is very fresh, due to its natural acidity, with fruity and floral aromas that depend on the grape variety. The white wines are lemon- or straw-coloured, around 8.5 to 11% alcohol, and are made from local grape varieties Loureiro, Arinto, Trajadura, Avesso, and Azal Branco. At less than one bar of CO_{2} pressure, they do not quite qualify as semi-sparkling wines but are nonetheless slightly sparkling.

The red and rosé Vinho Verde wines are much less common than the white ones. That is caused mainly by the region's climatic conditions with its relatively cool temperatures and high level of rainfall that make it impossible for the red wine grapes to ripen. The Vinho Verde red wines usually have red color and a fruity flavor with the tasting notes of pepper, peony, and sour plum. Vinho Verde rosé wines are also not very common, they have a slightly pink or intense color and red berries flavor.

Vinho Alvarinho is made from Alvarinho grapes, from a designated subregion of Monção and Melgaço. It has more alcohol (11.5 to 14%) and ripe tropical aromas. The reds are deep red and tannic, and are mostly made from Vinhão, Borraçal and Amaral grapes. The rosés are very fresh and fruity, usually made from Espadeiro and Padeiro grapes.

== History ==
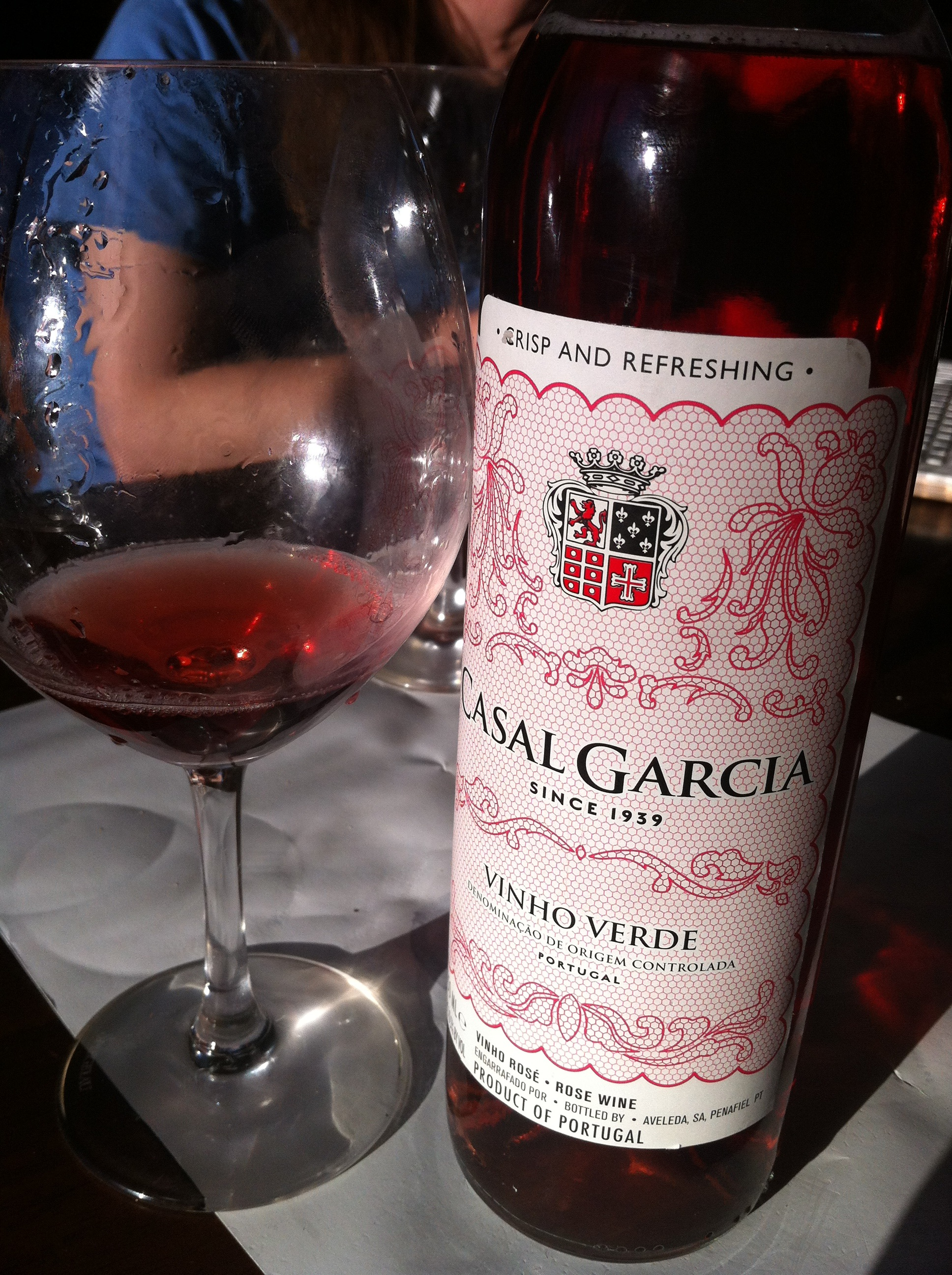
A rosé Vinho Verde

The Romans Seneca the Younger and Pliny the Elder both made reference to wines from the area between the rivers Douro and Minho.

A record exists of a winery being donated to the Alpendurada convent in Marco de Canaveses in 870 AD, and the vineyards seem to have expanded over the following centuries, planted by religious orders and encouraged by tax breaks. Wines were mostly produced for domestic consumption, although Vinho Verde may have been exported in the 12th century, to England, Germany, and Flanders. The first definite exports to England are recorded by John Croft as taking place in 1788.

The arrival of maize in the 16th century left a distinctive stamp on viticulture in the region. To maximize production of maize, new regulations banished vines to the field margins, where they would be draped over trees and hedges, forcing the vignerons to pick them from tall ladders.

The "Vinho Verde Region" was demarcated by the law of September 18, 1908 and a decree of October 1 of the same year. The regulations controlling production were largely set in 1926, with recognition as a Denominação de Origem Controlada (DOC) in 1984. The DOC is overseen by the Comissão de Viticultura da Região dos Vinhos Verdes (lit. 'Wine Commission of the Vinho Verde Region').

Currently, nearly 21,000 hectares of vineyards are planted, making up 9% of the total in Portugal. There are around 19,000 producers, down from 72,590 in 1981. Around 600 bottlers in the region produce 85 million liters of wine each year. 86% of the wine from Vinho Verde is white.

== Subregions ==
Vinho Verde locator map, Portugal

The Vinho Verde DOC is divided into nine subregions, which may be indicated on the wine label together with the name of Vinho Verde, for example as Vinho Verde-Amarante. The subregions are: Amarante, Ave, Baião, Basto, Cávado, Lima, Monção e Melgaço, Paiva, and Sousa.

== Grapes ==
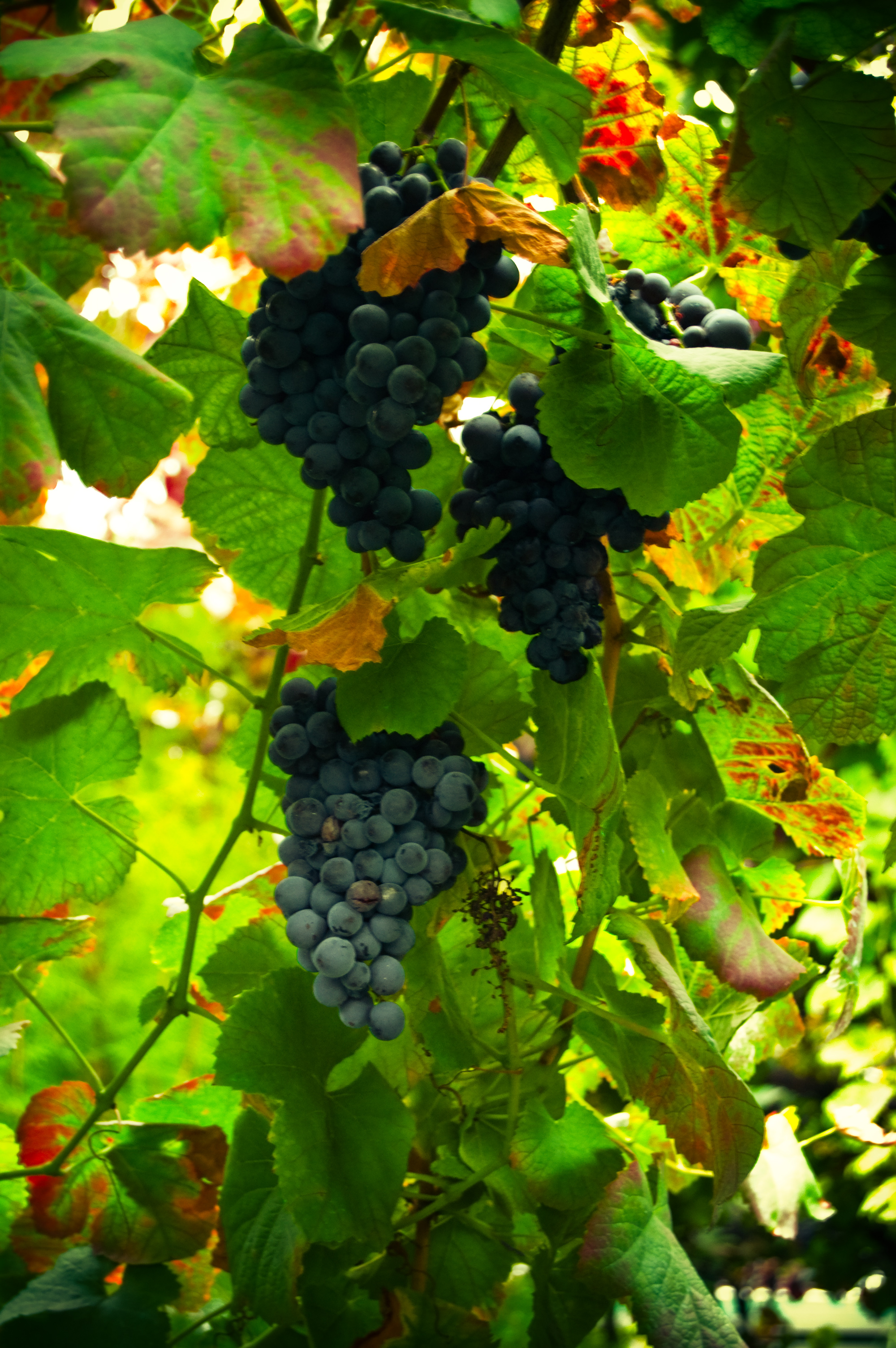
Grapes on a vine in the Vinho Verde region

The grape varieties recommended or permitted for the DOC are as follows:

- Recommended white grapes: Alvarinho, Arinto, Avesso, Azal, Batoca, Loureiro, and Trajadura
- Permitted white grapes: Branco-Escola, Cainho de Moreira, Cascal, Douradinha, Esganinho, Esganoso de Castelo de Paiva, Esganoso de Lima, Fernão Pires, Lameiro, Rabigato, S. Mamede, and Semilão
- Recommended red grapes: Amaral / Azal Tinto, Borraçal, Brancelho, Espadeiro, Padeiro, Pedral, Rabo de Ovelha, and Vinhão
- Permitted red grapes: Doçal, Doçal de Refóios, Espadeiro Mole, Labrusco, Mourisco, Pical Pôlho, Sousão, and Verdelho Tinto.

The two most successful white wine varieties are Alvarinho and Loureiro. Alvarinho tends to produce low yields and can reach much higher alcohol levels. The grape is widely planted in the northern Minho between the Lima Valley and Spanish border. Loureiro produces higher yields but very aromatic wines. The most successful red wine grape has been Vinhão, followed by Amaral / Azal Tinto and Espadeiro. These grapes can produce wines with deep purple coloring and peppery notes.

== See also ==
- List of Portuguese wine regions
- Verjuice
