= Portuguese wine =

Wine making in Portugal

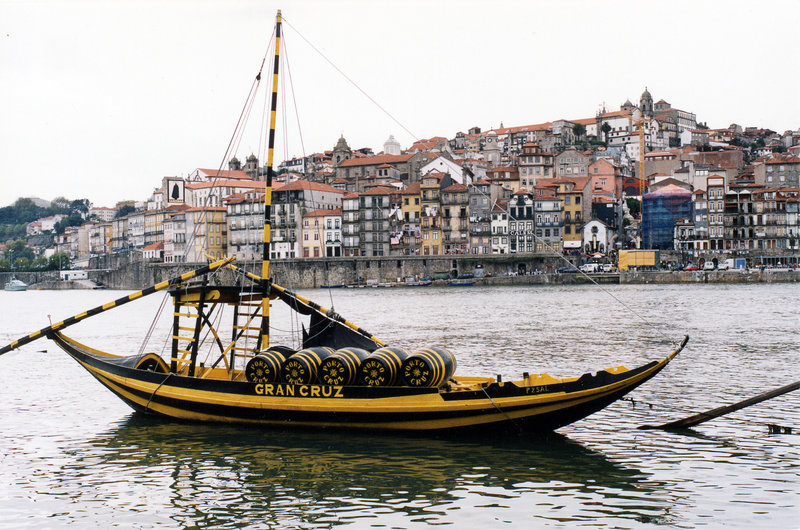
The traditional rabelo boat, used to transport Port Wine from the Douro Valley to the cellars near the city of Porto.

Portuguese wine was mostly introduced by the Romans and other ancient Mediterranean peoples who traded with local coastal populations, mainly in the South. In pre-Roman Gallaecia-Lusitania times, the native peoples only drank beer and were unfamiliar with wine production. Portugal started to export its wines to Rome during the Roman Empire. Modern exports developed with trade to England after the Methuen Treaty in 1703. From this commerce a wide variety of wines started to be grown in Portugal. In 1758, one of the first wine-producing regions of the world, the Região Demarcada do Douro was created under the orientation of Marquis of Pombal, in the Douro Valley. Portugal has two wine-producing regions protected by UNESCO as World Heritage: the Douro Valley Wine Region (Douro Vinhateiro) and Pico Island Wine Region (Ilha do Pico Vinhateira). Portugal has a big variety of local kinds, producing a very wide variety of different wines with distinctive personality.

== History ==
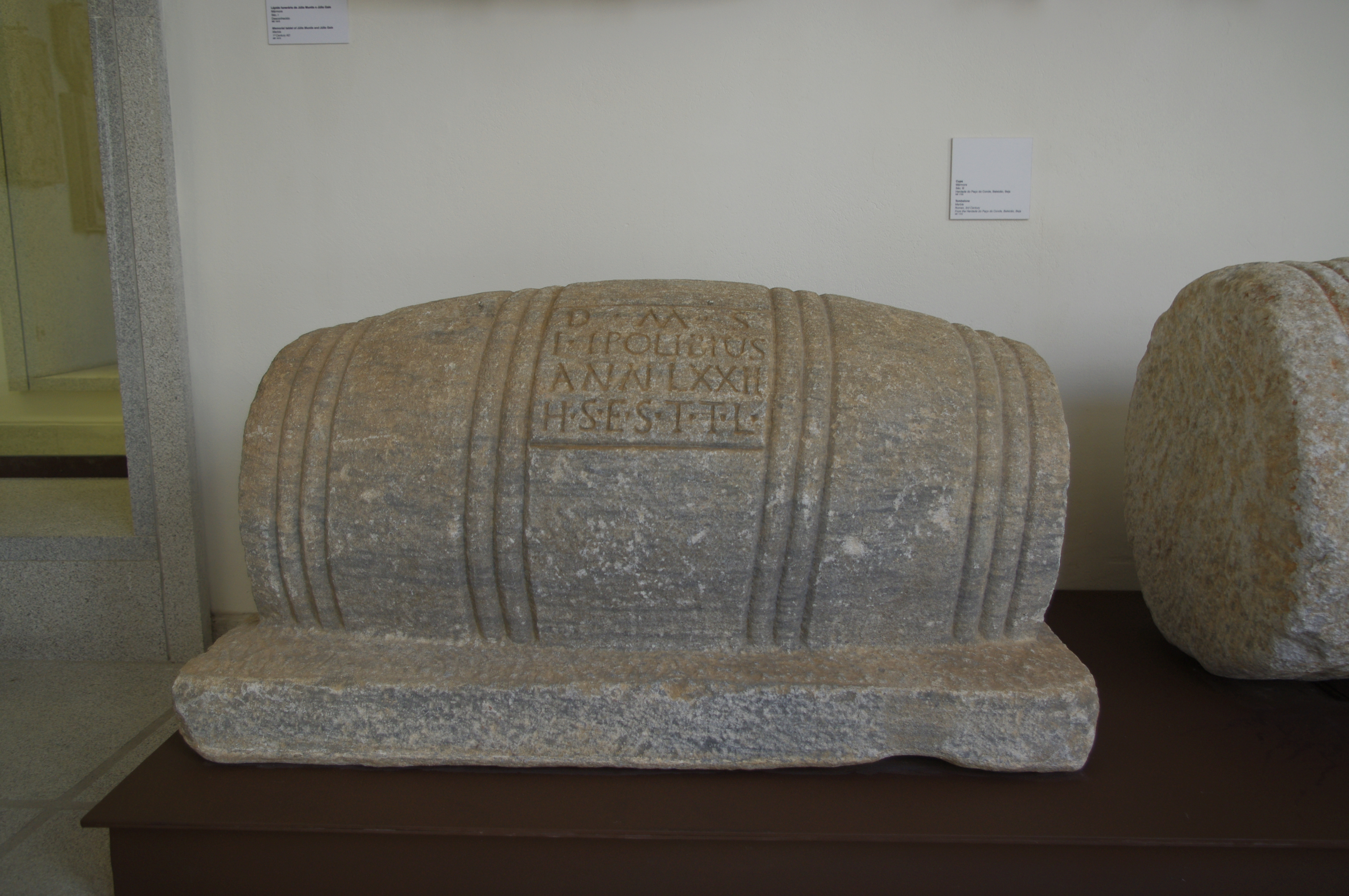
"cupa", Roman tombstones in the shape of wine barrels, were used in the 3rd century AD in Alentejo, Museu de Évora

In southern Iberian Peninsula, some archaeological finds attest that the consumption of wine occurred around the 7th to the 6th century B.C. and production started in the 5th to the 4th century B.C. Romans did much to expand and promote viticulture in their settlements in the province of Lusitania, most especially Portuguese Estremadura and the south of Portugal. In Northern Portugal, and according to the current knowledge, wine-making started with Roman rule. Strabo notices that the indigenous peoples in Northern Portugal mostly consumed zhytos (a form of beer) and wine was rarely produced or consumed; the wine, of low production, was immediately consumed in family banquets, all orderly sited and consuming by age and status, proving that wine was a fascination to them. Wines were then produced across the territory for both local consumption as well as export to Rome.

During the Reconquista in the 12th and 13th centuries, with the populating (povoamento) of the conquered territories, areas due to religion the Arabs reduced wine production. During this period, some new varieties were added to the ancient ones, from Burgundy came the French varieties. And during the period of discoveries, Henry the Navigator brought to the newly discovered island of Madeira the Moscatel and Malvasia from the Greek Island of Crete. In the Reign of King Carlos, the Região Demarcada do Vinho Verde and the Região Demarcada do Dão among Colares, Carcavelos, Setúbal, and Madeira were created. In 1979, Bairrada was added and in 1980 the Algarve region (Lagoa, Lagos, Portimão, and Tavira) was finally demarcated. In 1998, the Alentejo region was demarked by the gathering several smaller demarked regions created in 1995.

== Grapes ==
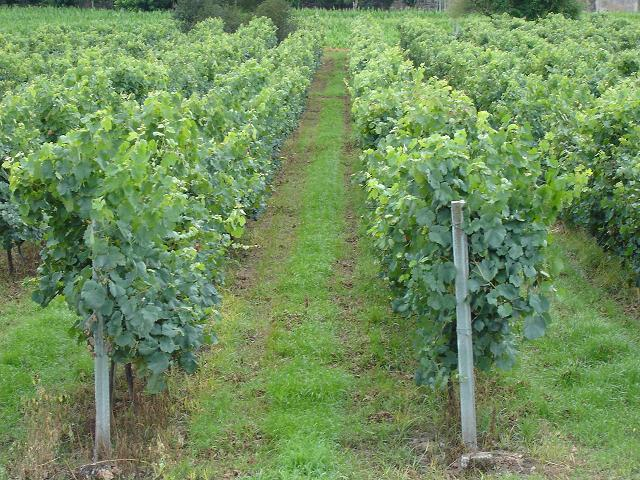
Vineyards in Vinho Verde Demarcated Region in Minho, Portugal

Portugal has a large array of native varietals, producing an abundant variety of different wines. The wide array of Portuguese grape varietals contributes as significantly as the soil and climate to wine differentiation, producing distinctive wines from the Northern regions to Madeira Islands, and from Algarve to the Azores. In Portugal only some grape varietals or castas are authorized or endorsed in the Demarcated regions, such as:

- Vinhos Verdes - White varieties Alvarinho, Arinto (Pedernã), Avesso, Azal, Batoca, Loureiro, Trajadura; red varieties Amaral, Borraçal, Alvarelhão, Espadeiro, Padeiro, Pedral, Rabo de Anho, Vinhão.
- Porto/Douro - Red varieties Touriga Nacional, Tinta Amarela, Tinta Roriz, Bastardo, Castelão, Cornifesto, Donzelinho Tinto, Malvasia Preta, Marufo, Rufete, Tinta Barroca, Tinta Francisca, Tinto Cão, Touriga Franca; white varieties Arinto, Cercial, Donzelinho branco, Folgazão, Gouveio, Malvasia Fina, Moscatel Galego branco, Rabigato, Samarrinho, Semillon, Sercial, Roupeiro, Verdelho, Viosinho, Vital.
- Dão - Red varieties Touriga Nacional, Alfrocheiro, Tinta Roriz, Jaen; White varieties Encruzado, Bical, Cercial, Malvasia Fina, Verdelho.
- Bairrada - Red varieties Baga, Alfrocheiro, Camarate, Castelão, Jaen, Touriga Nacional, Tinta Roriz; white varieties Maria Gomes, Arinto, Bical, Cercial, Rabo de Ovelha, Verdelho.
- Bucelas - White varieties Arinto, Sercial e Rabo de Ovelha.
- Colares - Red varieties Ramisco; White varieties Malvasia
- Carcavelos - Red varieties Castelão and Preto Martinho; White varieties Galego Dourado, Ratinho, Arinto.
- Setúbal - Red varieties Moscatel Roxo; white varieties Moscatel de Setúbal.
- Alentejo - Red varieties Alfrocheiro, Aragonez, Periquita1, Tinta Caiada, Trincadeira, Alicante Bouschet, Moreto; White varieties Antão Vaz, Arinto, Fernão Pires, Rabo de Ovelha, Roupeiro
- Algarve - Red varieties Negra Mole, Trincadeira, Alicante Bouschet, Aragonez, Periquita; White varieties Arinto, Roupeiro, Manteúdo, Moscatel Graúdo, Perrum, Rabo de Ovelha.
- Madeira - Red varieties Bastardo, Tinta, Malvasia Cândida Roxa, Verdelho Tinto e Tinta Negra; white varieties Sercial, Malvasia Fina (Boal), Malvasia Cândida, Folgasão (Terrantez), Verdelho.
- Tejo - Red varieties Baga, Camarate, Castelão, Trincadeira, Tinta-Miúda, Preto-Martinho, Aragonez, Touriga-Franca, Touriga-Nacional, Alfrocheiro, Caladoc, Esgana-Cão-Tinto, Jaen, Petit Verdot, Tinta-Barroca, Tinta-Caiada, Tinto-Cão, Merlot, Cabernet-Sauvignon, Bastardo, Pinot noir, Alicante-Bouschet, Grand noir, Moreto, Syrah; white varieties Arinto, Fernão Pires, Rabo-de-Ovelha, Tália, Trincadeira-das-Pratas, Vital, Verdelho, Tamarez, Cerceal branco, Alicante branco, Chardonnay, Malvasia-Rei, Pinot blanc, Sauvignon, Alvarinho, Moscatel-Graúdo, Síria, Viosinho.

== Appellation system ==
The appellation system of the Douro region was created nearly two hundred years before that of France, in order to protect its superior wines from inferior ones. The quality and great variety of wines in Portugal are due to noble castas, microclimates, soils and proper technology.

Official designations:

- Quality Wine Produced in a Specific Region (QWPSR) or VQPRD - Vinho de Qualidade Produzido em Região Demarcada
  - These are the most protected wine and indicates a specific vineyard, such as Port Wine, Vinhos Verdes, and Alentejo Wines. These wines are labeled D.O.C. (Denominação de Origem Controlada) which secures a superior quality.
- Wines that have more regulations placed upon them but are not in a DOC region fall under the category of Indicação de Proveniência Regulamentada (IPR, Indication of Regulated Provenance)
- Regional Wine - Vinho Regional Carries with it a specific region within Portugal.
- Table Wines - Vinho de Mesa carries with it only the producer and the designation that it's from Portugal.

== Wine regions ==
- Vinho Verde: This region is mainly in the Minho province, and is in the extreme north-west of Portugal. There are six areas :
1. Monção
2. Lima
3. Braga
4. Penafiel
5. Basto
6. Amarante

Vinho Verde derived its name from the fact that the grapes used are 'green' meaning slightly under-ripe. Vinho Verde wines are now largely exported, and are the most exported Portuguese wines after the Port Wine. The most popular variety in Portugal and abroad are the white wines, but there are also red and more rarely rosé wines. A notable variety of Vinho Verde is Vinho Alvarinho which is a special variety of white Vinho Verde, the production of Alvarinho is restricted by EU law to a small sub-region of Monção, in the northern part of the Minho region in Portugal. It has more alcohol (11.5 to 13%) than the other varieties (8 to 11.5%).

- Douro wine (Vinho do Douro) originates from the same region as port wines. In the past they were considered to be a bitter tasting wine. In order to prevent spoilage during the voyage from Portugal to England, the English decided to add a Portuguese wine brandy known as aguardente. The first documented commercial transactions appearing in registries of export date as far back as 1679. Today's Douro table wines are enjoying growing favor in the world, maintaining many traits that are reminiscent of a port wine.
- Dão wine is from the Região Demarcada do Dão, a region demarcated in 1908, but already in 1390 some measures were taken to protect this wine. The Dão Wine is produced in a mountainous region with temperate climate, in the area of the Mondego and Dão rivers in the northern region of central Portugal. These mountains protect the castas from maritime and continental influences.
- Bairrada wine, is produced in the Região Demarcada da Bairrada. The name "Bairrada" comes from the Portuguese word "barro" meaning "clay", due to the clayey soils of the region. Although the region was classified in 1979, it is an ancient vineyard region. The vines grow exposed to the sun, favouring the further maturity of the grapes. The Baga casta is intensely used in the wines of the region. The Bairrada region produces table, white and red wines. Yet, it is notable for its sparkling natural wine.
- Alentejo wine is produced from grapes planted in vast vineyards extending over rolling plains under the sun which shines on the grapes and ripens them for the production. Some producers of this region still do wine in great potteries as in Roman times.
- Colares wine is type of wine produced in sandy soils outside Lisbon between the foothills of Sintra and Roca Cape. Because of Lisbon's urban sprawl, the lands available for vineyards became so small, that the demands has always been higher than the production, making it one of the most expensive Portuguese wines.

=== Port ===
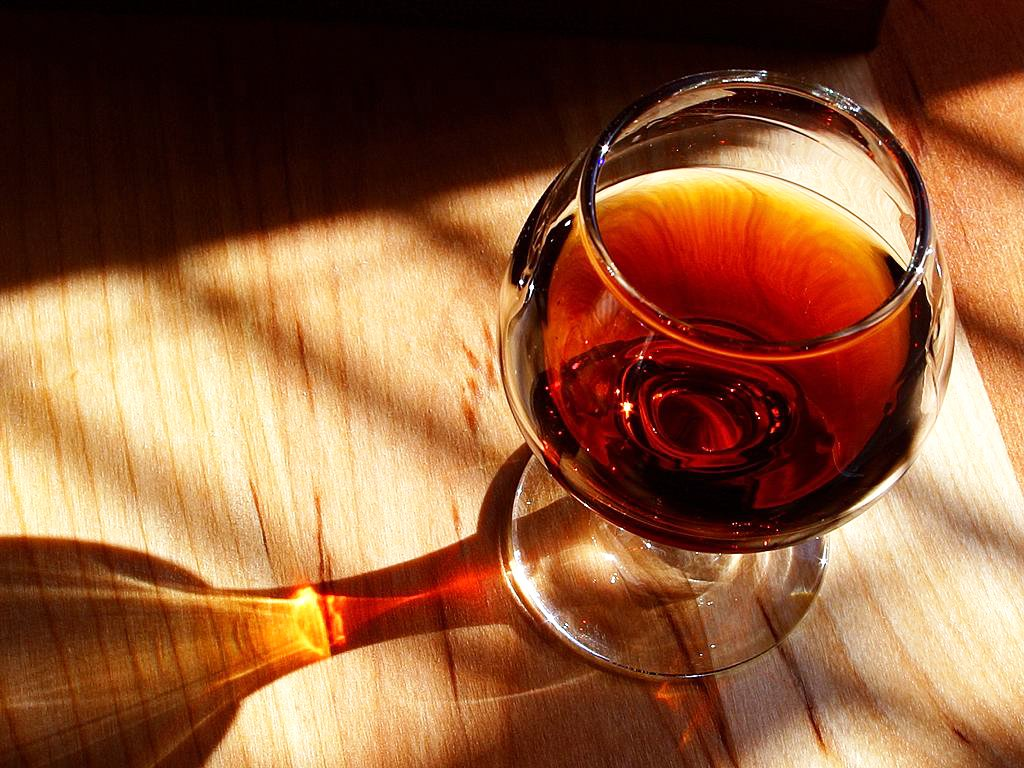
A glass of tawny port

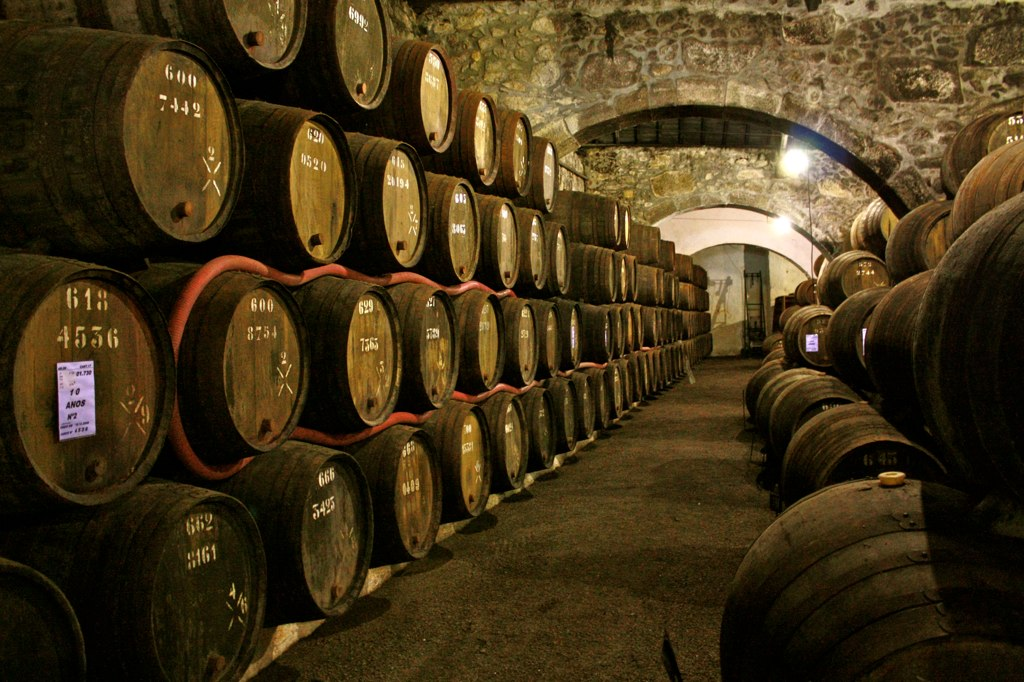
Port wine cellar

Port wine vines need to grow in schist rich soil and require a specific micro-climate. It is produced through a unique vinification method. The red varietals are the most common. The wine is produced in the beautiful landscape of the Douro Valley in Alto Douro region, a region that is classified as World Heritage by UNESCO. The wine is exported from the city of Porto, thus acquiring the name Porto (or "Port" in English-speaking countries). There are several varieties of Port wine: some of the most popular are the Tawny, White, Ruby, and Late Bottled Vintage (L.B.V.). Wine cellars where port wine is stored to mature can be visited all year around in order to get information about the history of Port Wine and the Douro region.

=== Moscatel ===
Moscatel is a liqueurous wine from the Setúbal Peninsula. Although the region has produced wines since the dawn of nationality, it was in 1797 that the wines of Setúbal were first mentioned. There is another variety of Moscatel wine, the "Moscatel de Favaios", in the Região Demarcada do Douro, it is made from a different casta, and the "Galego" (white), while Moscatel Roxo is made upon a casta with the same name as the wine.

== Some Portuguese wine terms ==
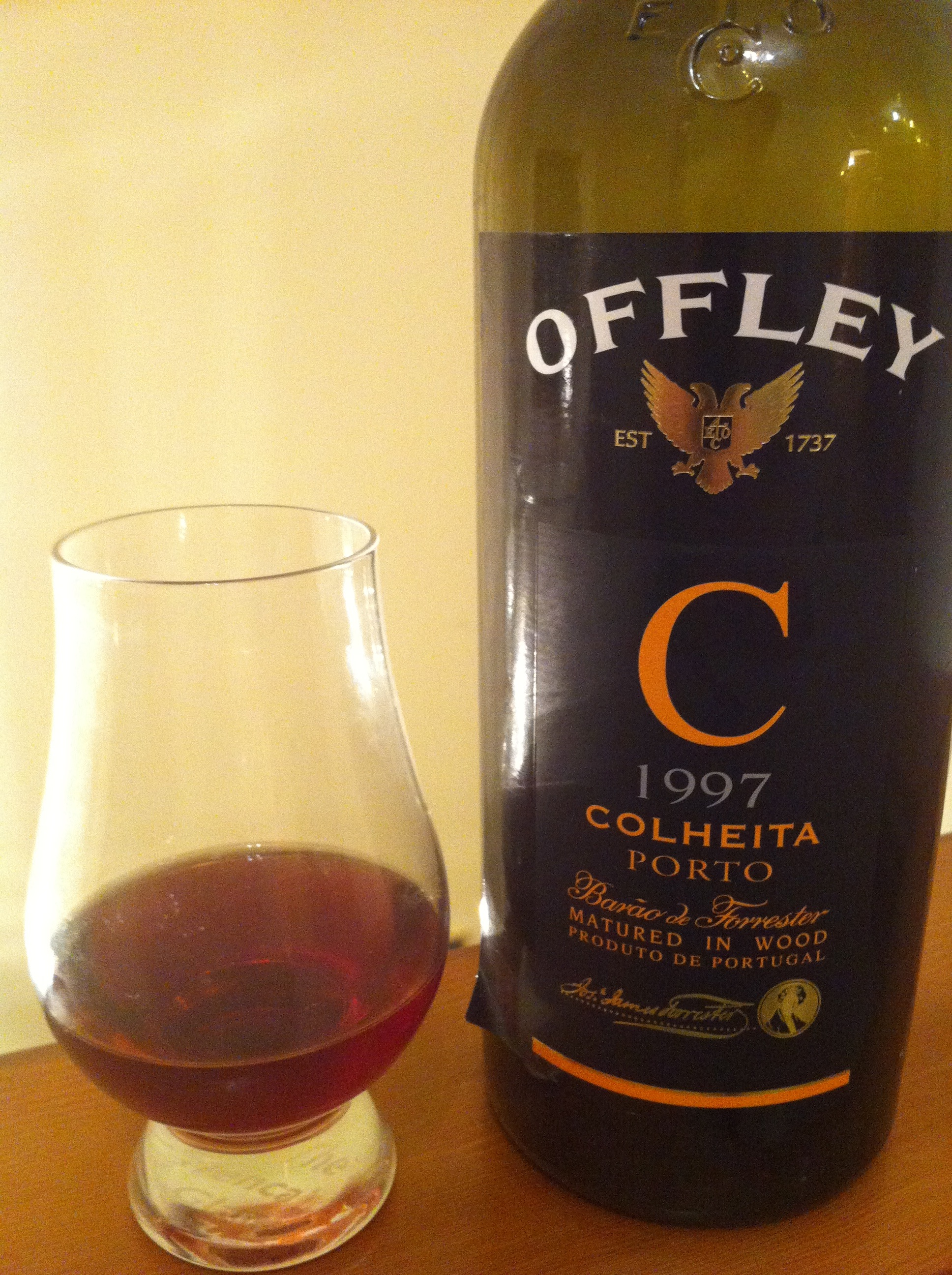
A colheita vintage tawny Port.

- Adega: Winery
- Branco: White
- Casta: Grape variety
- Colheita: Vintage year
- Doce: Sweet
- Espumante: Sparkling wine
- Garrafeira: A reserva red wine aged at least two years in a barrel and one year in a bottle; a white wine aged at least six months in a barrel and six months in a bottle.
- Maduro: Mature (in opposition to verde). Mature wines are Portuguese wines produced in all regions except the ones produced in Vinho Verde region; due to this, the term "maduro" rarely appears on bottles.
- Quinta: Vineyard
- Reserva: Superior quality wine of a single vintage
- Seco: Dry
- Tinto: Red
- Verde: Green (in opposition to maduro). Wines produced in Vinho Verde region with a distinctive method.
- Vinho: Wine

== Export ==
Wine has been one of the most noted Portuguese exports. The country is the seventh largest exporter of the product worldwide, by value.

Top ten wine exporting countries in 2005
Rank	Country	1000 tonnes
1	Italy	1,552.10
2	France	1,367.86
3	Spain	1,364.75
4	Australia	695.51
5	Portugal	534.47
6	Chile	422.42
7	South Africa	349.28
8	United States	345.92
9	Germany	284.50
10	Moldova	254.18
World		7,929.85

2005 Export market shares
Rank	Country	Market share (% of value in US$)
1	France	34.01%
2	Italy	18.03%
3	Australia	10.24%
4	Spain	9.18%
5	Chile	4.13%
6	Germany	3.25%
7	Portugal	3.17%
8	United States	3.00%
9	South Africa	2.90%
10	New Zealand	1.61%

== See also ==
- Old World wine
- Quinta classification of Port vineyards in the Douro
- Winemaking
- Agriculture in Portugal
