= Viosinho =

Variety of grape

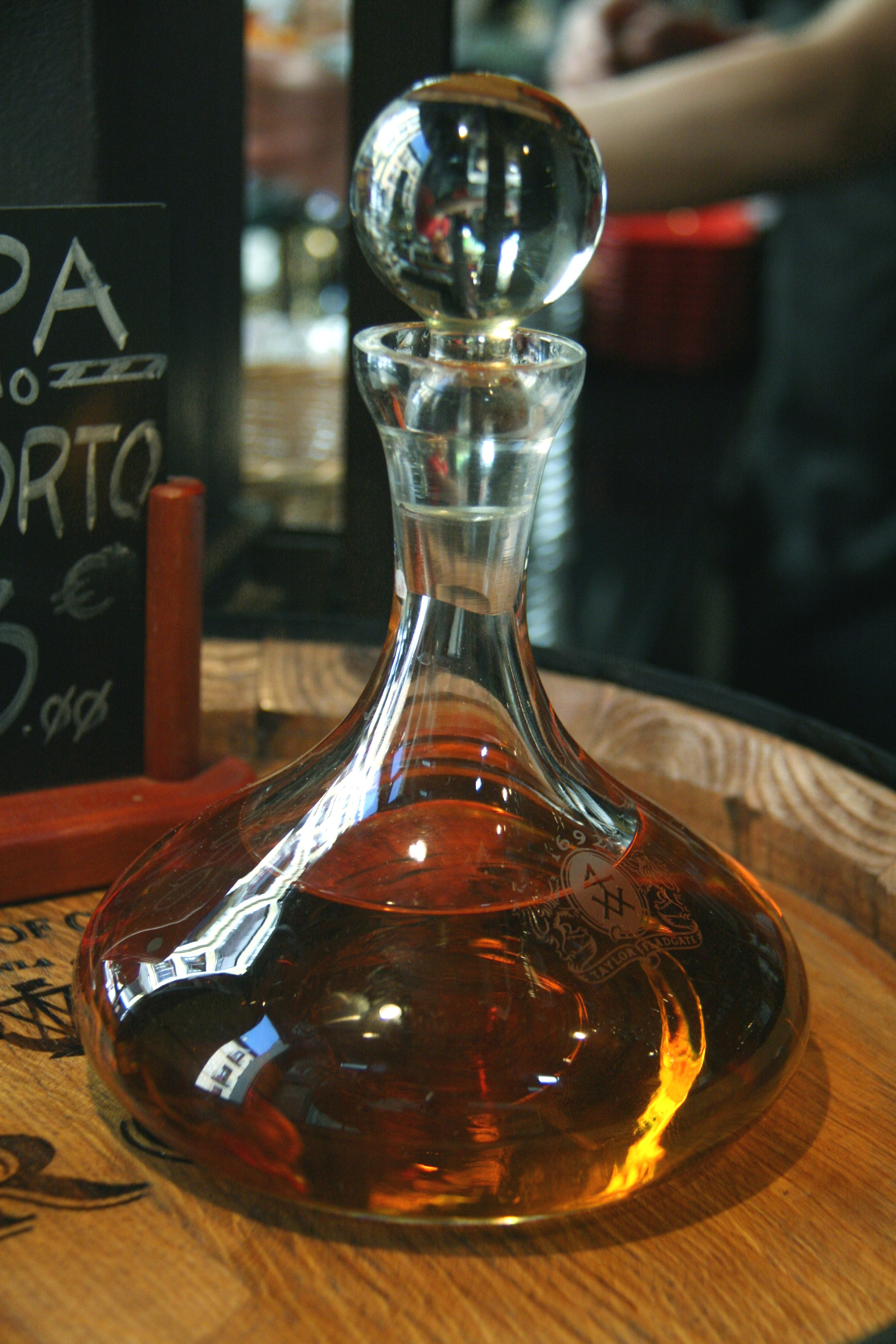
Viosinho is often used as a blending variety in Port wine production.

Viosinho is a white Portuguese wine grape variety that is grown primarily in northern Portugal where it attains high acidity levels. It is primarily found in the Trás-os-Montes and Douro DOCs. It is used primarily as a blending grape where it adds structures and flavor to both still and fortified Port wines.

== See also ==
- List of Port wine grapes
