= Encruzado =

Variety of grape

- Grape (Vitis)
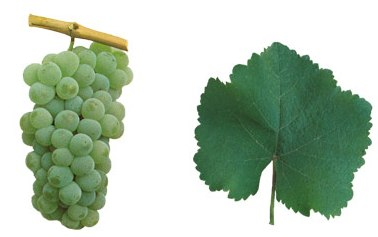
- Grapes and leaf of Encruzado
- Color of berry skin: Blanc
- Species: Vitis vinifera
- Also called: Salgueirinho
- Origin: Portugal
- Notable regions: Dão
- VIVC number: 3909

Encruzado is a white Portuguese wine grape grown primarily in the Dão DOC. It is mainly used as a blending grape.

It is also known as Salgueirinho.

== See also ==
- List of Portuguese grape varieties
