= Loureira Tinta =

Variety of grape

- Grape (Vitis)
- Color of berry skin: Noir
- Species: Vitis vinifera
- Also called: see list of synonyms
- Origin: Spain
- Notable regions: Galicia

Loureira Tinta is a rare red wine grape cultivated in Galicia, Spain. It is an authorised variety in the Rías Baixas DOP. Galicia also grows a white variety called Loureira.

== Synonyms ==
Loureira Tinta is also known under the synonym Loureiro Tinto.
