= Minho (river) =

River in Portugal and Spain

Minho Miño
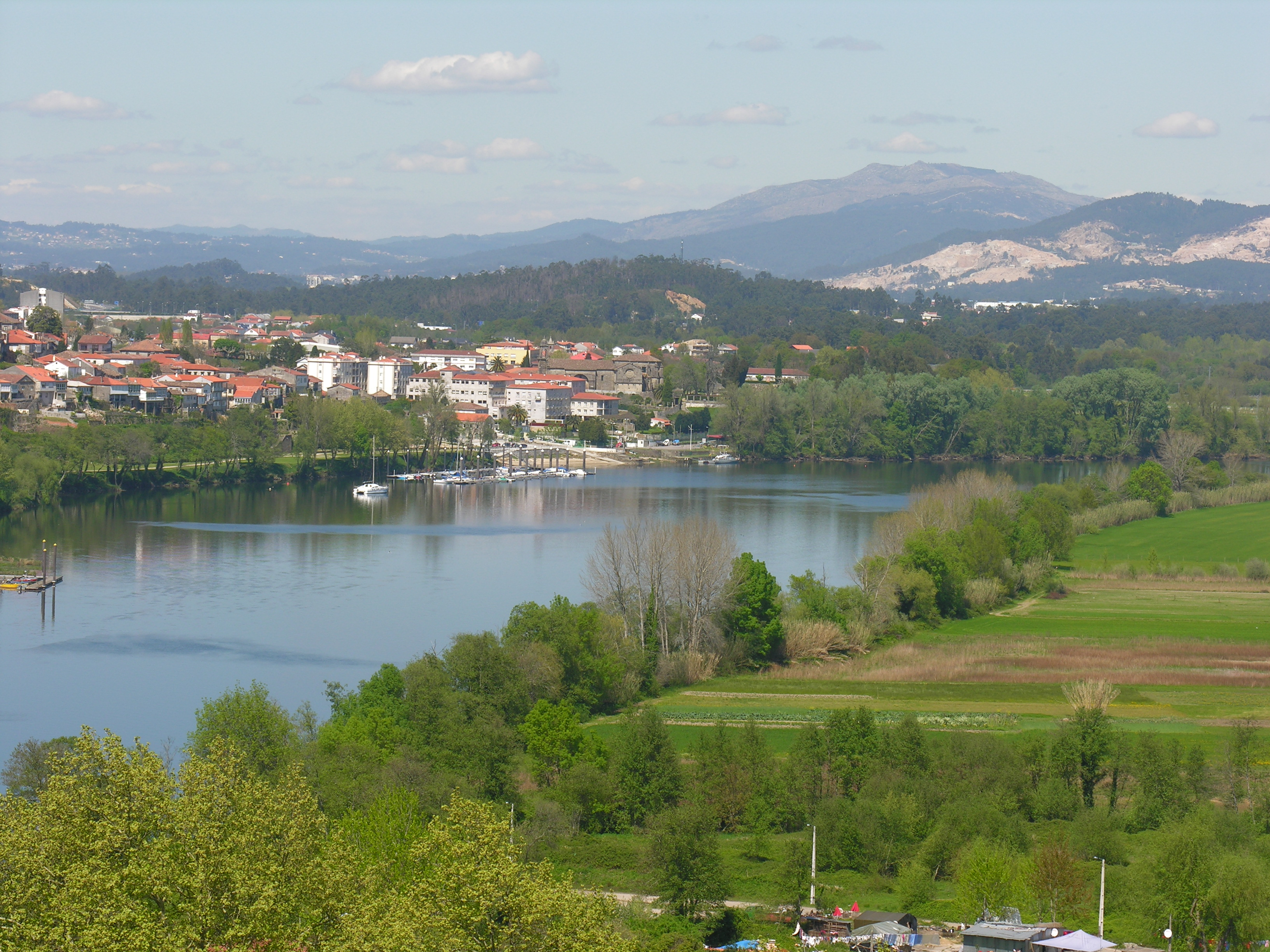
- The river Minho, and the town of Tui, as seen from Valença

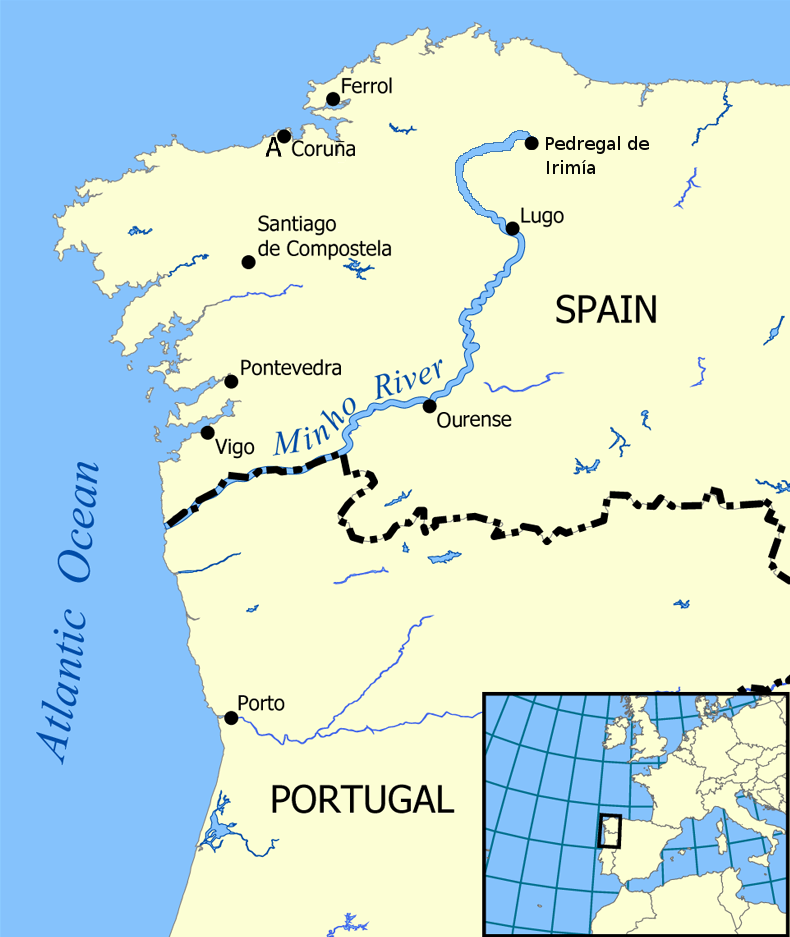
- Map showing the location of the Minho
- Nickname: O Pai Miño (Galician for 'The Father Minho')
- Native name: Miño (Spanish); Miño (Galician); Minho (Portuguese)

Location
- Country: Spain, Portugal
- City: Lugo, Ourense

Physical characteristics
- Source: Pedregal de Irimia
  - location: Serra de Meira, Lugo, Galicia, Spain
  - coordinates: 43°12′41″N 7°16′52″W
  - elevation: 695 m (2,280 ft)
- Source confluence: Peares
  - location: Ourense, Galicia, Spain
  - coordinates: 42°27′14″N 7°43′48″W
- Mouth: Miño Estuary. Near Caminha, Portugal.
  - location: Atlantic Ocean, Spain
  - coordinates: 41°52′0″N 8°52′12″W
  - elevation: 0 m (0 ft)
- Length: 350 km (220 mi)
- Discharge
  - average: 420 m^{3}/s (15,000 cu ft/s)

Basin features
- Reservoirs: Belesar, Peares, Velle, Castrelo and Frieira

The Minho (/ˈmiːn.juː/ MEEN-yoo; Portuguese: [ˈmiɲu]) or Miño (/ˈmiːnjoʊ/ MEEN-yoh; Spanish: [ˈmiɲo]; Galician: [ˈmiɲʊ]; Proto-Celtic: *Miniu) is the longest river in the autonomous community of Galicia in Spain, with a length of 340 kilometres (210 mi). It forms a part of the international border between Spain and Portugal. By discharge volume, it is the fourth largest river of the Iberian Peninsula after the Douro, Ebro, and Tagus rivers.

The Minho waters vineyards and farmland and is used to produce hydroelectric power. It also delineates a section of the Spanish–Portuguese border. In ancient English maps, it appears as Minno.

The source of the Minho lies north of Lugo in Galicia, in a place called Pedregal de Irimia. After about 73 kilometres (45 mi), the river passes just south of the walls of this old Roman city, discharging in average 42 m^{3}/s, and flows south through canyons until the valley widens north of Ourense. The river has been harnessed in reservoirs from Portomarín to Frieira. Along its length, it has the following reservoirs: Belesar with 654 cubic hectometres (530,000 acre⋅ft), Peares with182 cubic hectometres (148,000 acre⋅ft), Velle with17 cubic hectometres (14,000 acre⋅ft), Castrelo with,60 cubic hectometres (49,000 acre⋅ft) and Frieira with 44 cubic hectometres (36,000 acre⋅ft).

About 20 kilometres (12 mi) north of Ourense at Os Peares, the Minho, with a discharge of 102 m^{3}/s, receives the waters of its main tributary, the Sil, with 184 m^{3}/s. Passing Ourense, there is one major dam at Frieira near the town of Ribadavia, which is famous for its Ribeiro DOP wine (called after the name of the region). There, the Minho averages 316 m^{3}/s of discharge. Later on, the river flows in a southwest direction until reaching the Portuguese border near Melgaço.

After 260 kilometres (160 mi) through Galicia, the Minho sets the border with Portugal for about 80 kilometres (50 mi), mainly towards the west. The valley is a lush, green agricultural area where the land is used to produce corn, potatoes, cabbage, even kiwi fruit, or just grass, depending on the time of year, and everywhere, edging the fields, rivers, and gardens, wherever there is space, are the vines that produce the light, slightly sparkling "Vinho Verde" and the Ribeiro wine, both peculiar to this area. The very best of these wines, Alvarinho in Portuguese or Albariño in Spanish and Galician, is produced in the area around Monção, Arbo, and Melgaço.

Passing the medieval towns of Melgaço and Monção, the Minho divides the Spanish Tui and Portuguese Valença do Minho, towns that guarded an important bridge for road and rail. Both towns preserve fortifications and are national monuments. The Minho reaches the Atlantic between the Galician A Guarda and the Portuguese Caminha, with an average discharge of 420 m^{3}/s.

== Geography ==
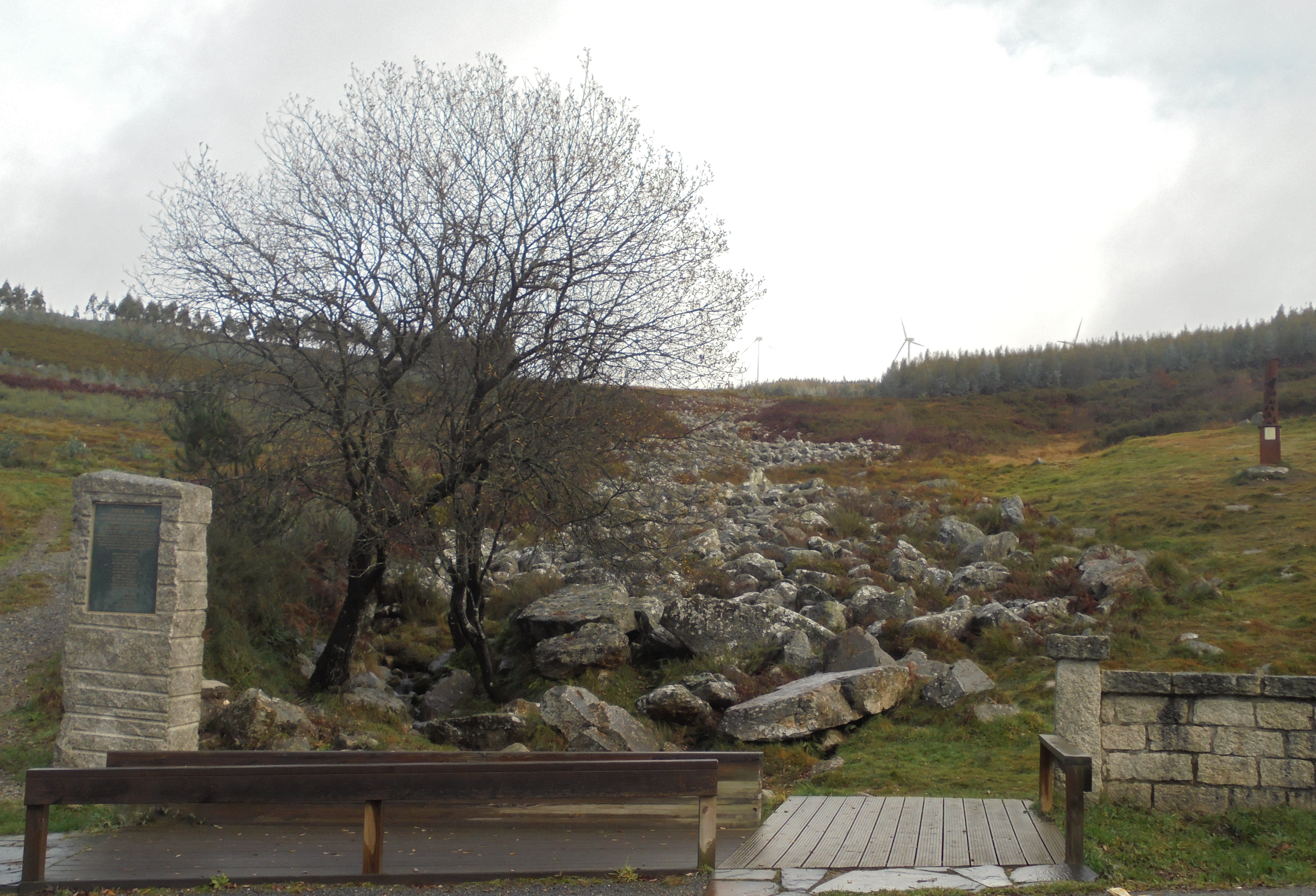
Pedregal de Irimia

The river begins in the Pedregal de Irimia of the Sierra de Meira, about 695 metres (2,280 ft) above sea level, in the northeast of the province of Lugo, where it flows through the town of Meira and reaches the lagoon Fonminhá in the municipality of A Pastoriza. The lagoon was historically (and wrongly) regarded as the source of the Minho. The river flows through the Galician massif, the Cantabrian Mountain range and the mountains of Leon, two of the rainiest areas of the Iberian Peninsula.

The upper course has been declared a Biosphere Reserve. The first 64 kilometres (40 mi) cross the plateau of Lugo (Terrachá), a peneplain whose elevation ranges from 450 to 650 metres (1,480 to 2,130 ft) above the sea level.

The main tributaries are the Sil, Neira, Avia, Barbantiño, Búbal, Arnoya rivers.

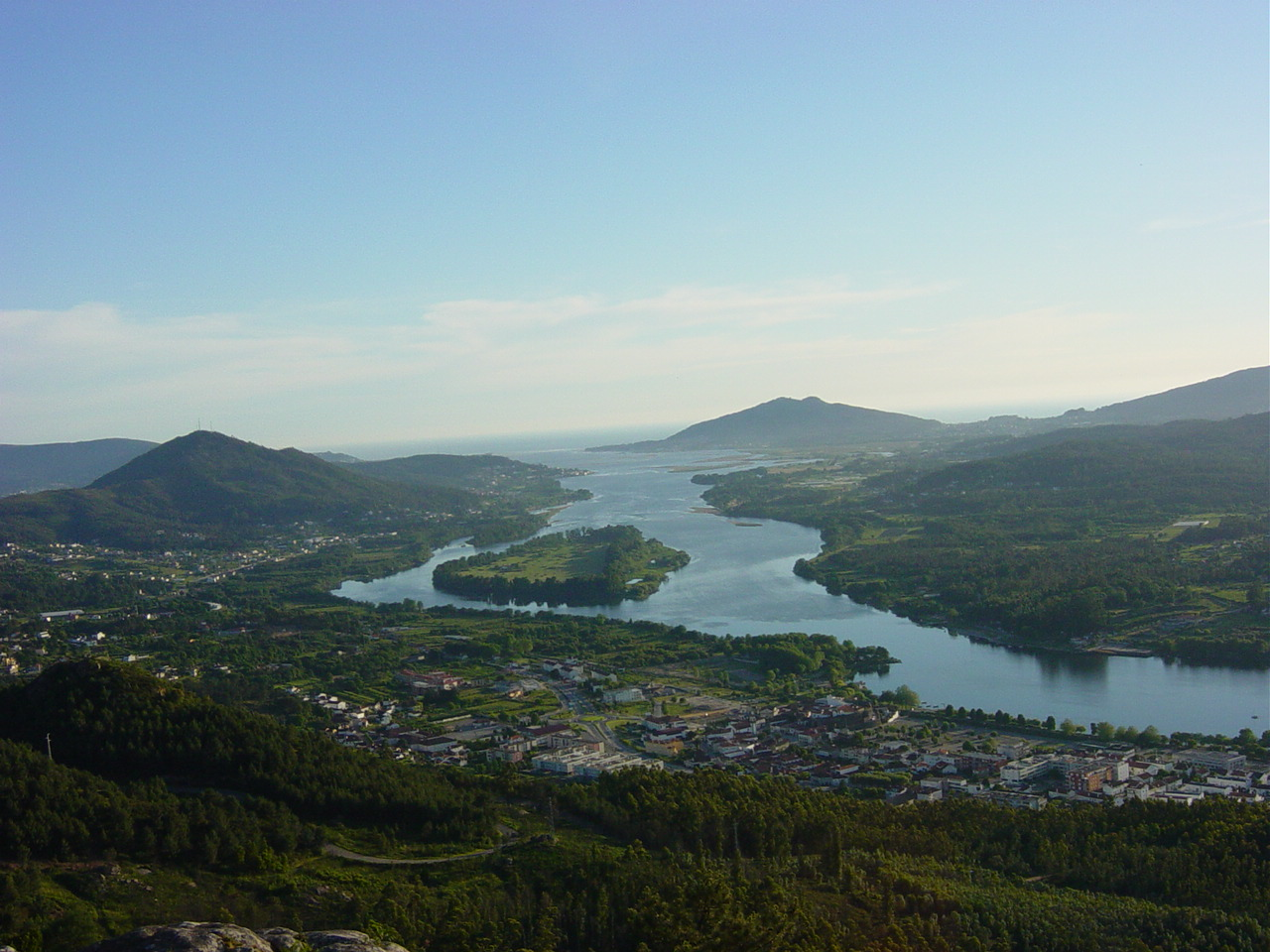
The mouth of the Minho

== Etymology ==
According to E. Bascuas, "Miño", registered as Minius and Mineus, is a form belonging to the old European hydronymy and derived from the Indo-European root *mei- 'walk, go'.

== Legends, traditions and superstitions ==
Oral tradition contains stories telling of Galician mythological characters living in the basin of the Rio Minho, such as feiticeiras (witches) who lived in the river, the Xarcos who dwelt in wells located throughout the watershed, and fish-men who were amphibious with the possibility of living both on land and in water.

== Tributaries ==
=== Right ===
- Pontevedra
  - Río Tamuxe (also called Carballas, Carballo or Carvallo)
  - Río Pego
  - Río Cereixo da Brinha
  - Río Furnia (also called Forcadela)
  - Río Louro
  - Río Caselas
  - Río Tea
  - Río Uma
  - Río Deva (there is another Deva River on the left bank)
  - Río Ribadil
  - Río Cea
- Ourense
  - Río Avia
  - Río Barbantiño
  - Río Bubal
- Lugo
  - Río Asma
  - Río Narón
  - Río Ferreira
  - Río Mera
  - Río Narla
  - Río Ladra
  - Río Támoga
  - Río Anllo

=== Left ===
- Portugal
  - Rio Mouro
  - Rio Gadanha
  - Rio Coura
- Ourense
  - Río Deva
  - Río Arnoia
  - Río Barbaña
  - Río Lonia
  - Sil River
- Lugo
  - Río Sardiñeira
  - Río Loio
  - Río Neira
  - Río Chamoso
  - Río Robra (also called Río Santa Marta)
  - Río Lea
  - Río Azúmar

== See also ==
- List of rivers of Portugal
- List of rivers of Spain
- Rivers of Galicia
