= Avesso =

Variety of grape

- Grape (Vitis)
- Color of berry skin: Blanc
- Species: Vitis vinifera
- Also called: See list of synonyms
- Origin: Portugal
- VIVC number: 798

Avesso is a white Portuguese wine grape planted primarily in the Minho region of Portugal. It can make full-bodied aromatic wines. Ampelographers believe it may be related to the Portuguese grape Jaen.

== Synonyms ==
Avesso is also known under the synonyms Bornal, Bornao, Borracal Branco, and Borral.

== See also ==
- List of Portuguese grape varieties
