= Caíño blanco =

Variety of grape

Caíño blanco or Cainho branco is a white Spanish and Portuguese wine grape variety that is grown in northwest Spain and northern Portugal in a stretch of area between Vinho Verde and the Denominación de Origen (DO) of Rías Baixas. The grape is often confused for Albariño and in Vinho Verde it is sometimes known under the name Alvarinhão (a synonym shared with another Portuguese grape, Fernão Pires). While DNA profiling conducted in the early 21st century has shown that the two grapes are distinct varieties, the evidence has suggested that Caíño blanco maybe an offspring of Albariño from a natural crossing with the red Portuguese wine grape Azal tinto (also known as Caíño Bravo).

== History ==
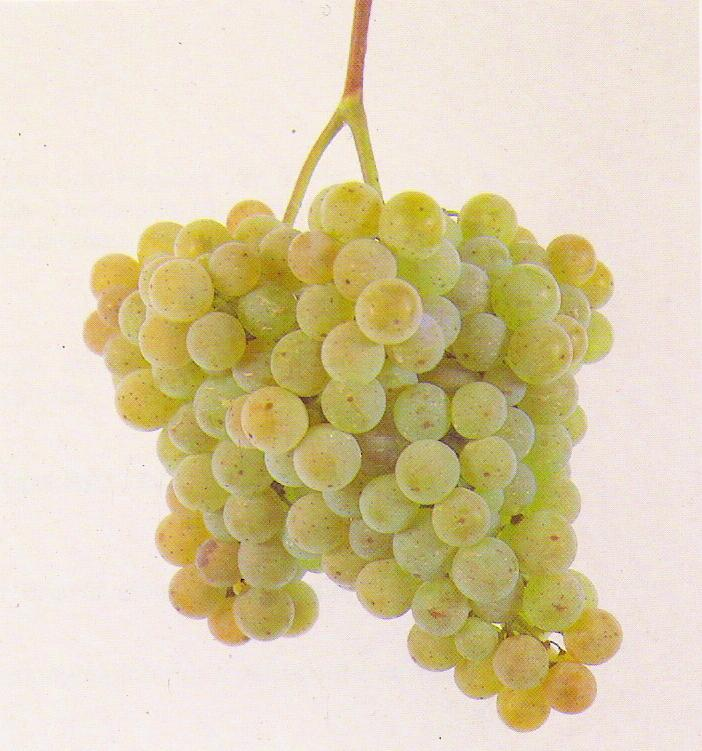
DNA evidence has suggested that Albariño is one of the parent varieties to Caíño blanco.

Ampelographers believe that Caíño blanco is native to the northwest Iberian Peninsula and was likely the result of a natural crossing between Albariño and Azal tinto. Caíño blanco has been growing in the Spanish wine region of Galicia and northern Portugal since at least 1722 when it was first mentioned so the crossing between Albariño and Azal tinto would have had to occur sometime before the 18th century. Swiss geneticist José Vouillamoz notes that the DNA evidence linking Caíño blanco to Albariño and Azal tinto is based on analysis of only 27 genetic markers and that the Caiño family of grapes (which includes Caiño tinto, Caiño Bravo/Azal tinto, Caiño Berzal, Caiño Frexio and Caiño Redondo) has a very complex genetic history which would require more analysis in order to confirm Caíño blanco's origins.

== Viticulture ==
Caíño blanco is a mid to late ripening grape variety that also buds early to midway through the budding period for grapevines. The grape is susceptible to the viticultural hazards of both downy and powdery mildew.

== Wine regions ==
The Rías Baixas wine region in northwest Spain.

In 2008, there were 58 hectares (140 acres) of Caíño blanco growing in Spain, virtually all of it in the northwest Spanish wine region of Galicia where the grape is a permitted variety in the Rías Baixas and Monterrei DOs. In Rías Baixas, most of the plantings of Caíño blanco are found in the O Rosal area in the province of Pontevedra where it is often blended with Albariño. Across the border in Portugal there were 7 hectares (17 acres) of the grape in cultivation as of 2010.

== Styles ==
According to Master of Wine Jancis Robinson, Caíño blanco tends to produce wines of high alcohol levels with zesty acidity and mineral notes.

== Synonyms ==
Over the years, Caíño blanco has been known under a variety of synonyms including: Alvarinhão, Cainho, Cainho branco, Cainho de Moreira (in Vinho Verde), Caino blanco, Caíño branco (in Galicia and Portugal), Caino branco and Caino de Moreira.
