= Alvarelhão =

Variety of grape

- Grape (Vitis)
- Color of berry skin: Noir
- Species: Vitis vinifera
- Also called: (more)
- Origin: Portugal
- Notable regions: Douro, Dão
- Notable wines: Dão
- VIVC number: 1650

Alvarelhão is a red wine grape grown in northern Portugal.

== History ==
Alvarelhão must have originated in northern Portugal, but little is known of its ancestry. DNA studies have shown some similarity to Esgana Cão.

== Distribution and Wines ==
=== Portugal ===
In Portugal there are 470 hectares of either Alvarelhão or the grape called Brancelho. It is blended into red wine in the Dão region. It is said to be part of the port wine blend in the Douro, although it is not mentioned on the IVDP website as one of the main 11 red grapes of the Douro.

=== Spain ===
In Spain Alvarelhão is grown as Brancellao, where they also use the synonym of Albarello. It is one of the authorised varieties in the Galician wine regions of Rías Baixas DOP and Ribeira Sacra. Although similar in name, it is different from Albariño.

=== United States ===
There have been some experiments with the port grapes in California. It is possible that some vines have been misidentified, as the University of California, Davis clone Alvarelhão FPMS 02 has now been confirmed as a Touriga Nacional.

== Vine and Viticulture ==
Having evolved in the Dão, the vine is both rough and hardy, having strong defenses against temperature extremes and inclement weather.

== Synonyms ==
Alvarelhao, Alvarello, Locaia, Pilongo and Varancelha.

German sources, including de:Brancelho, refer to a Brancelho grape used in Vinho Verde whose synonyms include Alvarelhão Ceitão, Varancelho and Verancelha. It is not certain that this is the same grape as Alvarelhão.

Spanish synonyms include Brancellao and Albarello.

== See also ==
- Portuguese wine
- List of Portuguese wine grape varieties
