= Albariño =

Variety of grape

Albariño / Alvarinho
- Grape (Vitis)
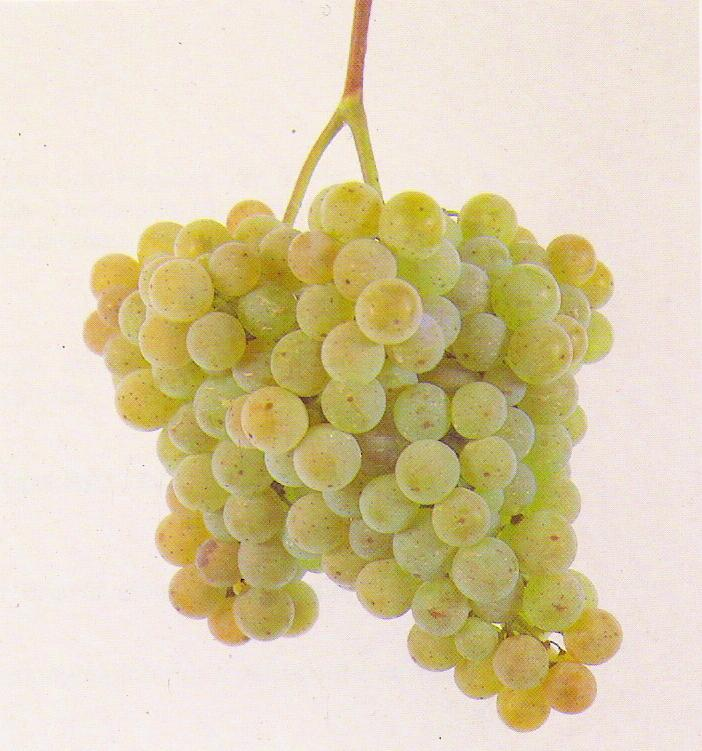
- Bunch of Alvarinho /Albariño grapes
- Color of berry skin: Blanc
- Species: Vitis vinifera
- Also called: Alvarinho and other synonyms
- Origin: Galicia and Portugal
- Notable regions: Minho, Portugal; Galicia, Spain
- Notable wines: Vinho Verde (Vinho Alvarinho), Rías Baixas
- VIVC number: 15689

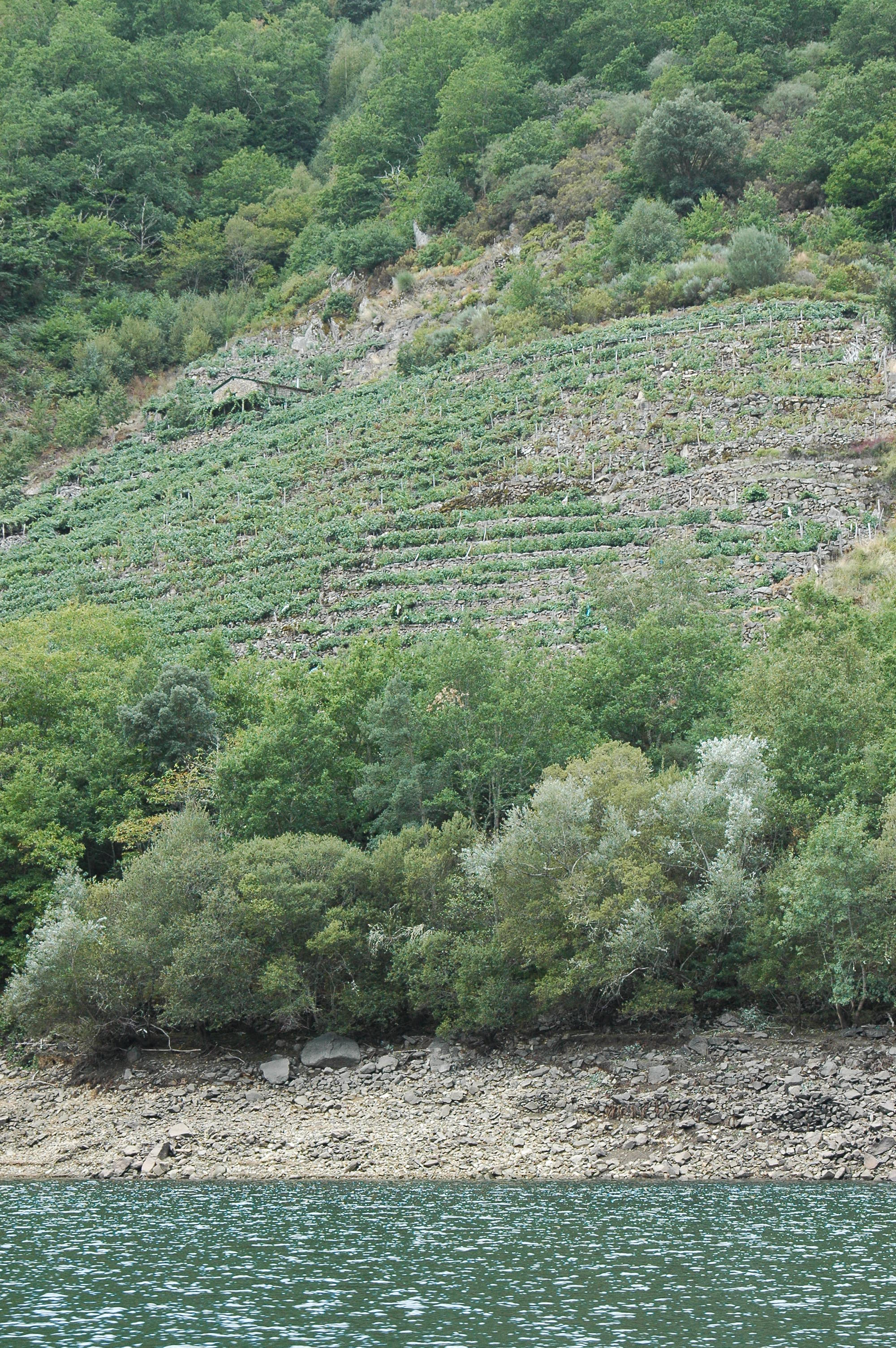
Albariño grapes on a slope near the river Sil in Ourense, Spain

Albariño (Galician pronunciation: [alβaˈɾiɲʊ]) or Alvarinho (Portuguese pronunciation: [alvɐˈɾiɲu]) is a variety of white wine grape grown in Galicia (northwest Spain) and in Northwest Portugal (Monção and Melgaço, Alto Minho) where it is also used to make varietal white wines. Albariño is the name for the grape in Galician. In Portugal it is known as Alvarinho, and sometimes as Cainho Branco.

It was once thought that Albariño/Alvarinho was brought to Iberia by monks from the monastery of Cluny in the twelfth century, but recent studies point to Albariño/Alvarinho being native to Galicia/Portugal. Both the Galician "Albariño" and the Portuguese "Alvarinho", derive from albo<albus, meaning "white, whitish". It has also been theorized that the grape is a close relative of the French grape Petit Manseng.

It should not be confused with Alvarinho Lilás (Madeira), Albarín Blanco (Asturias in Northern Spain), Albillo Real, Azal, Caiño Blanco (O Rosal in Galicia and Portugal), Galego Dourado, Savagnin Blanc (Galicia, France, Australia), or Verdeca (Puglia in Italy).

== Major regions ==
Spain produces Albariño to a significant degree in the Rías Baixas DO, as well as in Barbanza e Iria. In Portugal Alvarinho is common in the Vinho Verde region, but it is only authorised to be grown in Monção and Melgaço. In other locations such as Ribeiro, Lima, or Braga it is often mixed with other grapes such as Loureiro, Godelho, Cainho or Borraçal, Arinto or Treixadura to produce blended wines. Such blends were common throughout Galicia too until about 1985; when the Rías Baixas DO was established in 1986, Albariño began to emerge as a variety, both locally and internationally. Its emergence as a variety led the wines to be "crafted for the palates of Europe, America and beyond and for wine drinkers who wanted clean flavours and rich, ripe fruit" and led to wines completely different from those produced across the river in Portugal.

Albariño is now produced in several California regions including the Santa Ynez Valley, Clarksburg, Napa, Edna Valley and Los Carneros AVAs. Albariño is also produced in Oregon, first by Abacela Winery in the Umpqua Valley AVA, and in Washington state.

Albariño is also grown in Uruguay and is produced as a varietal by Bodegas Garzon.

Albariño has also attracted the attention of Australian winemakers, several of whom produce varietal wines. However, it was discovered that grape growers and wine makers in Australia had been supplying and selling wrongly labelled Albariño for over a decade. A French expert visiting Australia raised questions in 2008, and DNA testing confirmed that the grapes thought to be Albariño were in fact French Savagnin and almost all wine in Australia labelled as Albariño is Savagnin.

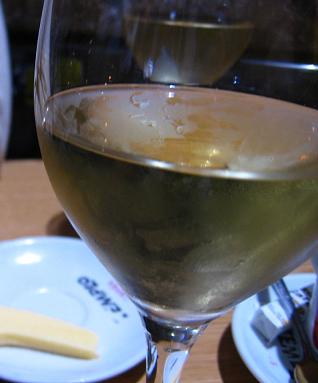
Albariño wine from Galicia.

== Wine characteristics ==
The grape is noted for its distinctive botanical aroma with a citrus undertone, very similar to that of Viognier, Gewurztraminer, and Petit Manseng, suggesting apricot and peach. The wine produced is unusually light, and generally high in acidity with alcohol levels of 11.5–12.5%. Its thick skins and large number of pips can cause residual bitterness.

== Viticulture ==
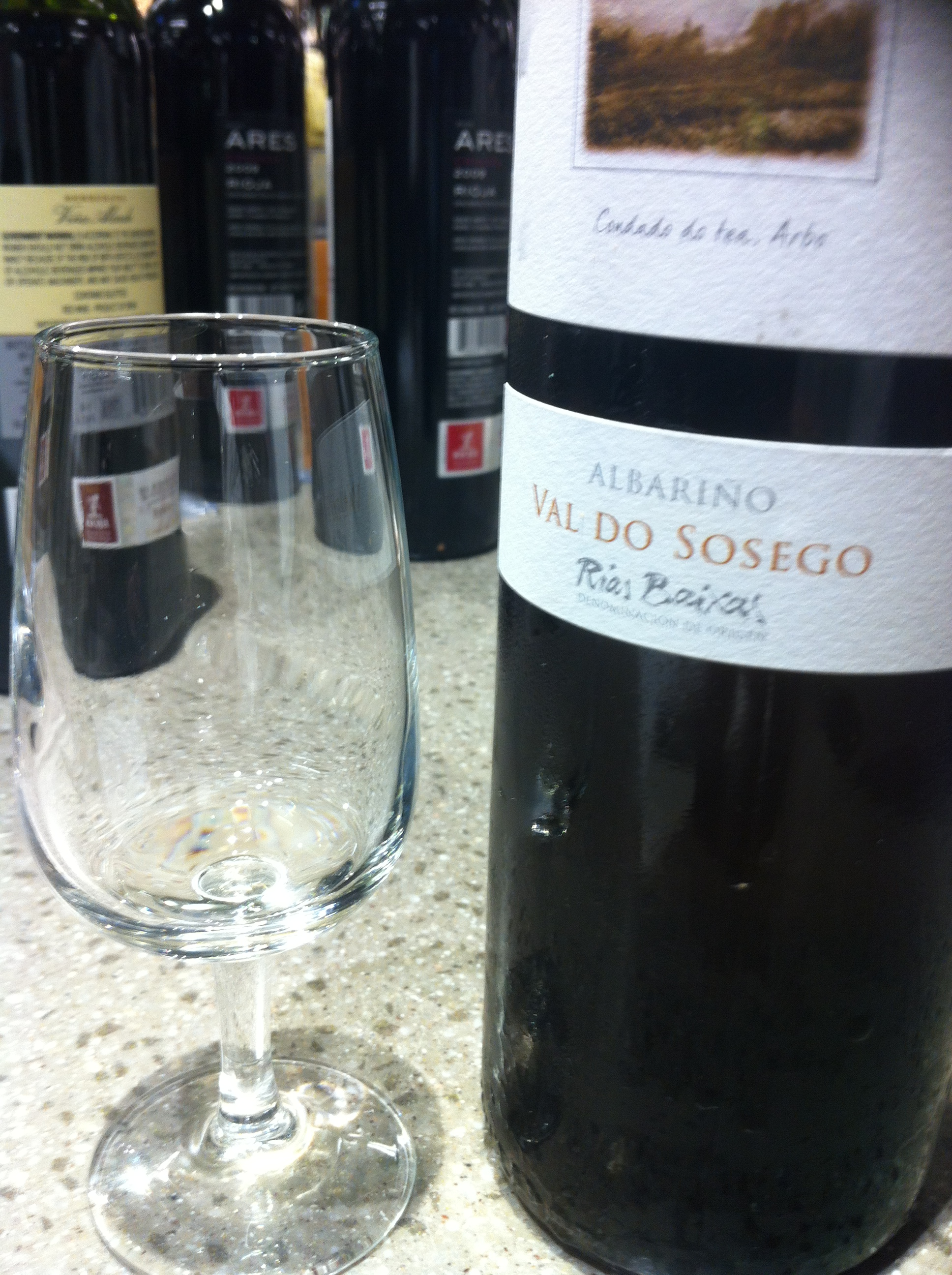
A Spanish Albariño.

For hundreds of years, Alvarinho/Albariño vines could be found growing around the trunks of poplar trees and in bushes along the outside margins of fields—a practice which some growers still use in Portugal's Vinho Verde region. In the middle of the century, however, growers made big investments and became professional grape growers. In Vinho Verde, the vines are typically trained on high pergolas, which encourages over-cropping, often leading to grapes that are unable to exceed more than 8.5% potential alcohol. When grown in a vineyard, the vines need to be wire trained with large canopies to accommodate the 30 to 40 buds per shoot that is typical. The grape responds well to the heat and humidity though the high yields and bunching of clusters usually keep the grapes within the margins of ripeness.

== Synonyms ==
Alvarinho/Albariño is also known under the synonyms Albelleiro, Alvarin Blanco, Azal Blanco, Galego, Galeguinho, and Padernã.

== See also ==
- List of Portuguese grape varieties
