= Loureiro (grape) =

Variety of grape

- Grape (Vitis)
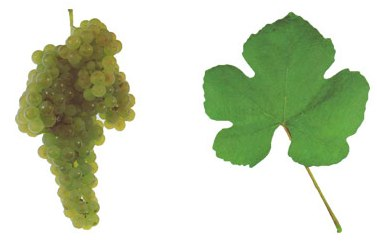
- Loureiro: grape and leaf
- Color of berry skin: Blanc
- Species: Vitis vinifera
- Also called: see list of synonyms
- Origin: Portugal
- Notable regions: Minho, Galicia
- VIVC number: 6912

Loureiro is a white wine grape cultivated in the northwest of the Iberian Peninsula. This includes Galicia, Spain and Minho, Portugal. In the latter, it is notably cultivated along the Lima River, a sub-region of Vinho Verde (wines produced in Minho).

== Viticulture ==
Its bud break is early-medium and its ripening period is medium-late. Its vigor is medium-strong. It is suitable for somewhat humid or medium-dry soils. It has a medium sensitivity to mildew, is sensitive to powdery mildew and is very sensitive to botrytis.

== Synonyms ==
Loureiro is also known under the synonyms Branco Redondo, Branco Redondos, Dorado, Dourada, Dourado, False Pedro, Gallego Dourado, Loeireiro Blanco, Loureiro, Loureiro Blanco, Marques, Marquez, and Rutherglen Pedro.

== See also ==
- List of Portuguese grape varieties
