= Caiño tinto =

Variety of grape

- Grape (Vitis)
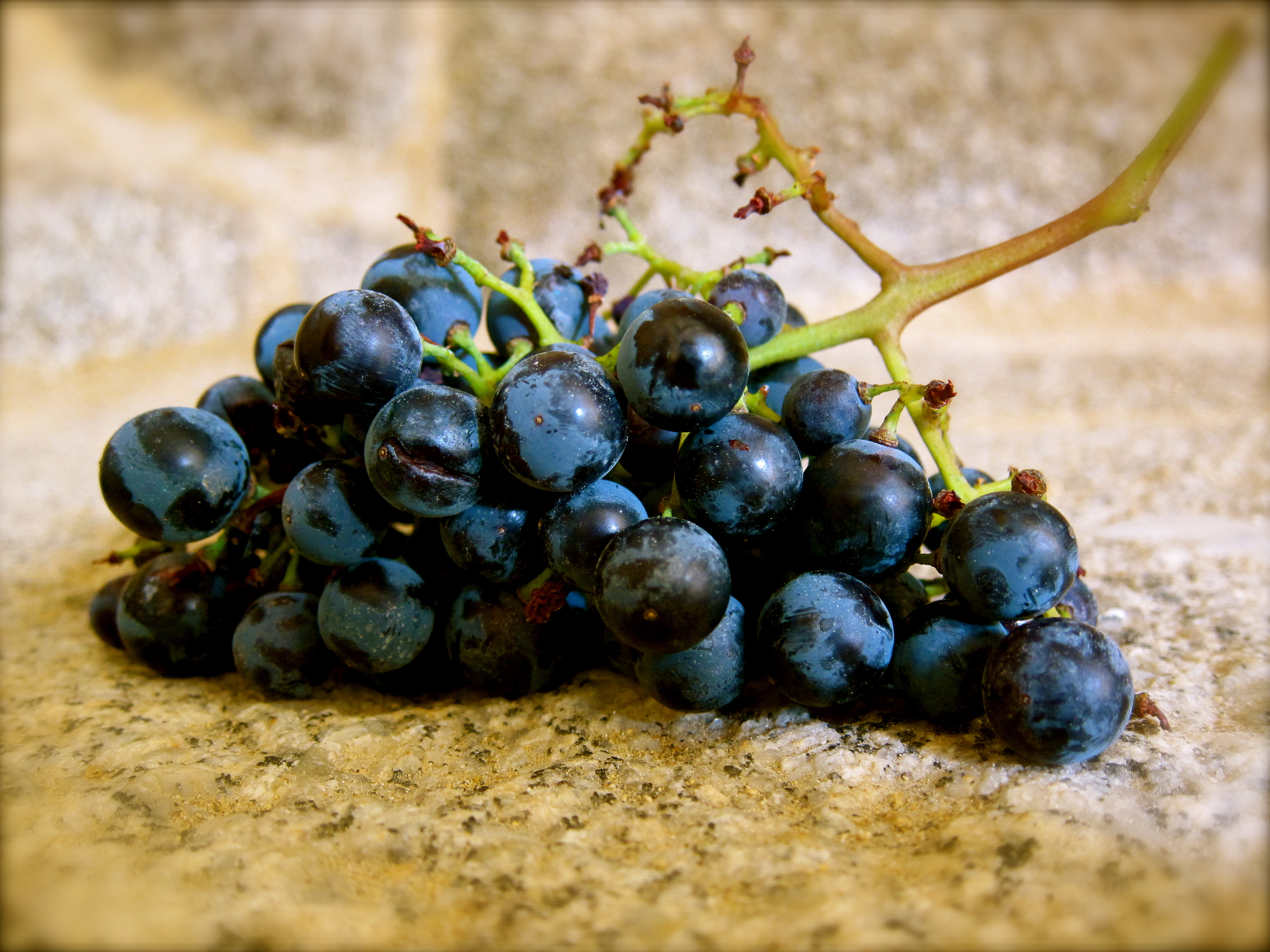
- Color of berry skin: Noir
- Species: Vitis vinifera
- Also called: Borraçal
- Origin: Portugal
- Notable regions: Vinho Verde
- VIVC number: 1564

Caíño tinto (also known as Borraçal in Portuguese) is a red Galician wine grape variety that is also grown in Portugal's Vinho Verde wine region where it is known as Borraçal. In Spain, it is a permitted variety in the Denominación de Origens (DOs) of Rías Baixas and Ribeiro where it produces highly perfumed wines with noticeable tartness and high acidity.

== Synonyms ==
Among the synonyms that have been used to describe Caiño tinto and its wines are Azedo, Bagalhal, Bogalhal, Borraco, Borrasao, Bougalhal, Bovvaco, Cainho Gordo, Cainho Grande, Cainho Grosso, Caiño Gordo, Caiño Grosso, Esfarrapa, Esfarrapas, Espadeiro Redondo, Morraça, Oeil de crapaud and Olho de Sapo.
