= Sezão =

Varietal wine grape

- Grape (Vitis)
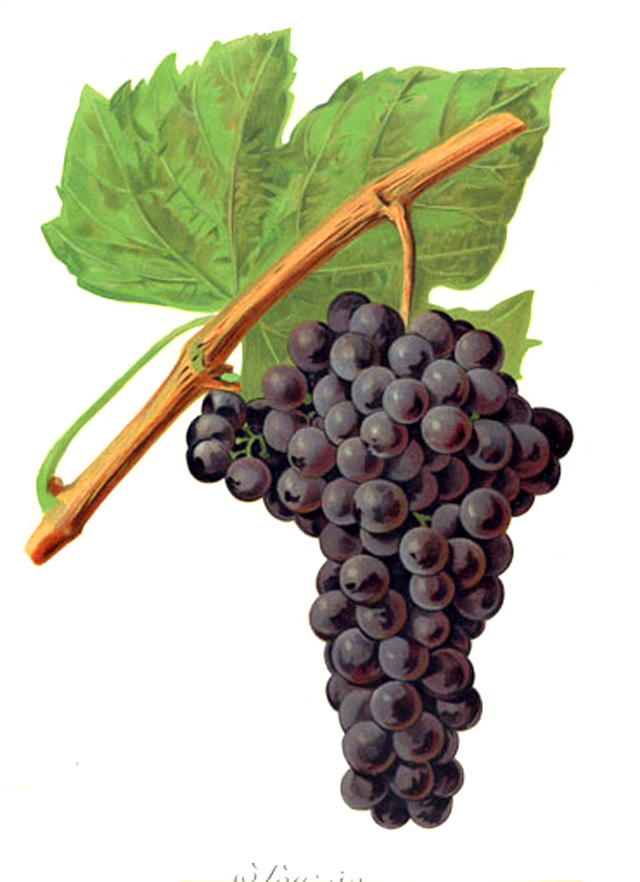
- Souzão in Viala & Vermorel
- Color of berry skin: Noir
- Species: Vitis vinifera
- Origin: Portugal
- VIVC number: 13100

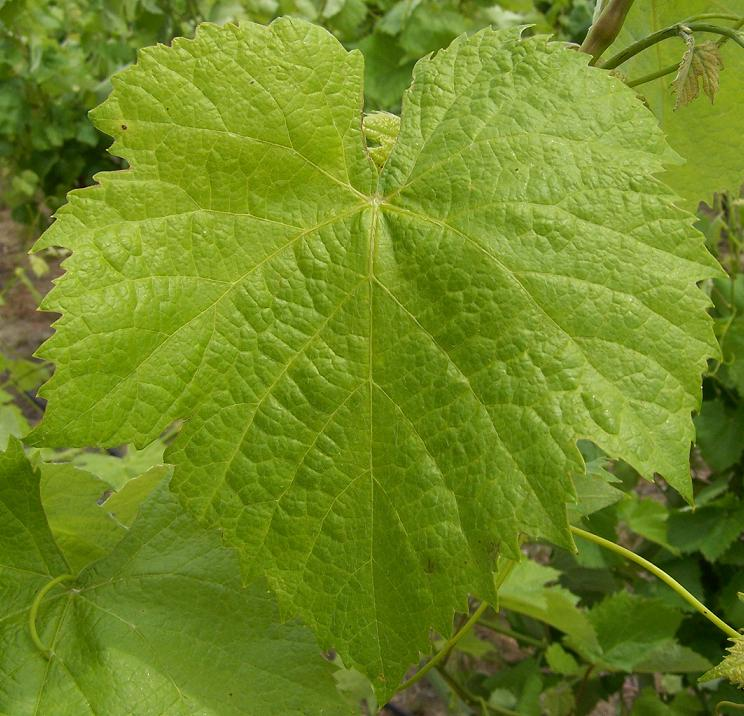
Sezão leaf.

Sezão (Spanish: Sousón), formerly known as Souzão, is a Portuguese wine grape that is used in the production of port wine and table wines.

== Genetic distinction between Souzão and Vinhão ==
The names Souzão and Vinhão were once used as synonyms for the same variety, but recent research has shown that while they are genetically close, they are two distinct varieties. For this reason, the name has been changed to Sezão and formally registered this way in Portugal's Coleção Ampelográfica Nacional (National Ampelographic Collection).

== Usage in wine ==
While originating in the Minho region, it is used primarily in Australia, California and South Africa. Sezão is also an authorized grape in the Monterrei DO in Galicia. In Portugal, it is also an authorized planting in the Douro, and Dão-Lafões area (Vinho do Dão). It shows up as a key player in Quinto do Noval's Nacional. The grape is known for the deep color it produces in a wine as well as its rustic and raisiny taste.

In Australia, Sezão is used to make port-style wines and also table wines, often blended with other Portuguese grape varieties.

In South Africa, it is regarded as one of the better fortified-wine varieties for its high sugar levels and deep color.

== Synonyms ==
Sousão, Sousão de Comer, Sousão Forte, Sousão Vermelho and Souzão

== See also ==
- List of Port wine grapes
- List of Portuguese wine grape varieties
