= Fruela =

Fruela or Froila is a masculine given name of Gothic origin used in Spain in the Middle Ages. The form "Froila" is that which appears in Latin inscriptions and documents, while "Fruela" is the Old Spanish form. For historical persons, the forms are largely interchangeable. The variant Froilán is of the same origin, but derives from the Latin oblique case form Froilane. The feminine forms of the name, Froileuva (Froiliuba) or Froilana, were rarer. The patronymic derived from Froila is Fróilaz (or Froilaz).

Numerous variations on the name occur in medieval sources. From western Iberia: Froilla, Froyla, Froilo, Froia, Froiam, Frogila, Froiano, Froilarius, Froilatius, Froilano. From eastern Iberia: Foilani, Fraula, Friulano, Frodane, Froilane, Froilani, Froilus, Frolani, Frolia, Froylane, Froylano, Froylus, Frua, Fruao, Fruglane, Fruila, Fruilane, Fruilanus, Fruilla, Frula, Frulla, Fuila.

It may refer to:

- Froia (fl. 653), Gothic count
- Fruela of Cantabria (d. c. 758), Gothic nobleman
- Fruela I of Asturias, king, r. 757–68
- Fruela (usurper), king, r. 866
- Froila (bishop of Lugo), r. 875–83
- Fruela II of Asturias, king, r. 910–25
- Froia (bishop of Vic), r. 957–72
- Froila Arias, 11th-century nobleman
- Froila Muñoz, 11th-century nobleman
- Froila Vermúdez de Traba, 11th-century nobleman
- Fruela Díaz (d. 1119), nobleman
- Froila Ramírez (d. 1203), nobleman

== See also ==
- Froiliuba (fl. 737), queen of King Favila of Asturias
- King Froila, a character in the opera Alfonso und Estrella (1822)
