= Rajo =

Rajo may refer to:

- Rajo (surname), various people
- Rajo, Syria, a village in Syria
- Rajo Jack (1905–1956), American race car driver
- Rajo Singh (1928–2005), politician from Bihar, India
- Rajo Motor and Manufacturing, a company that manufactured Model T cylinder heads
- Rajo Nizamani, a town in Taluka, Tando Muhammad Khan district, Sindh, Pakistan
