= A Pobra do Brollón =

Coordinates: 42°33′25.4″N 7°23′31″W

- Municipality
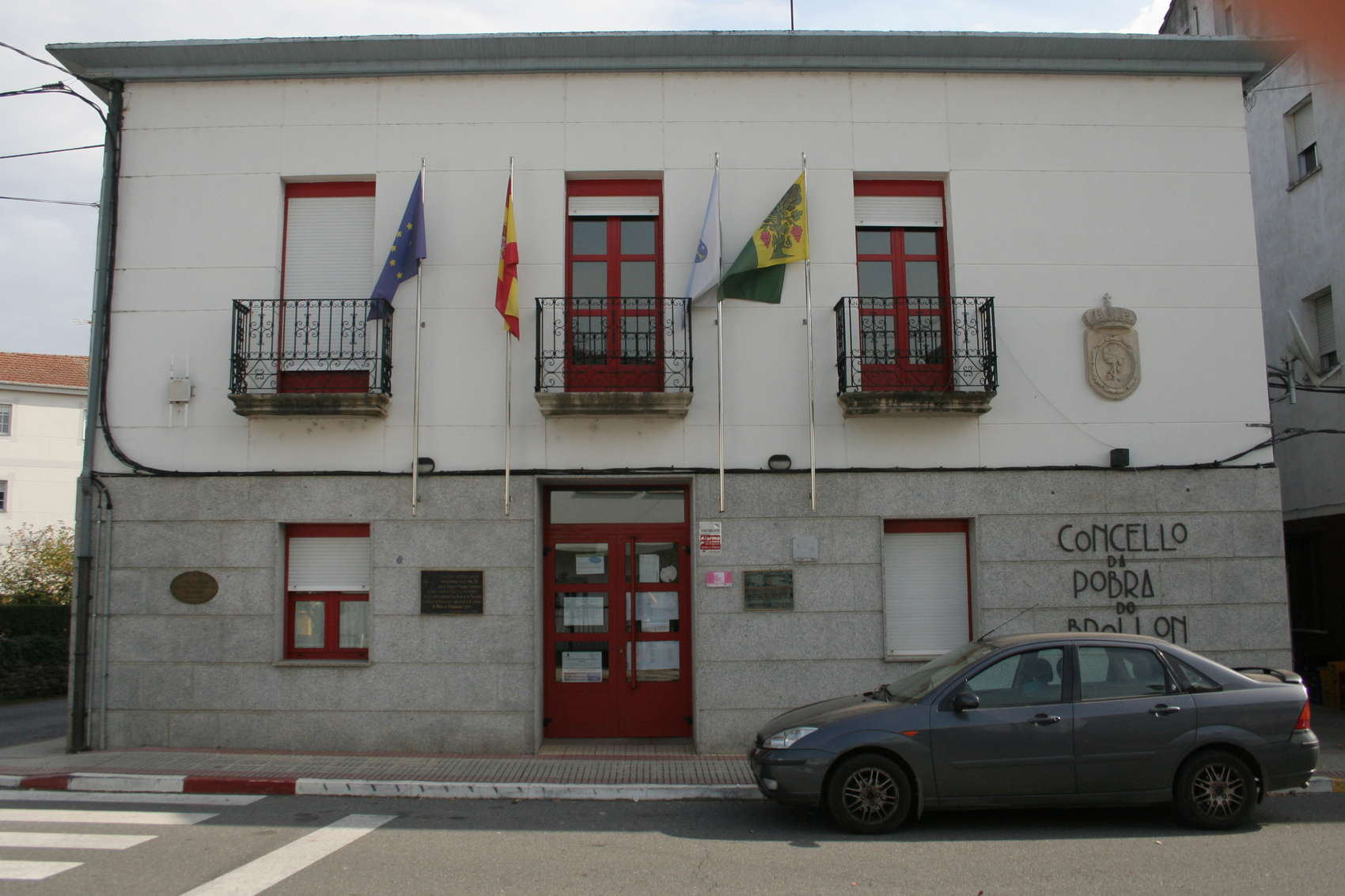
- Town hall.

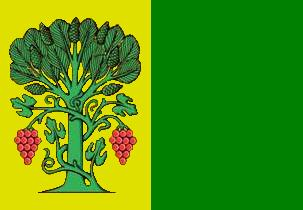
- Flag Coat of arms

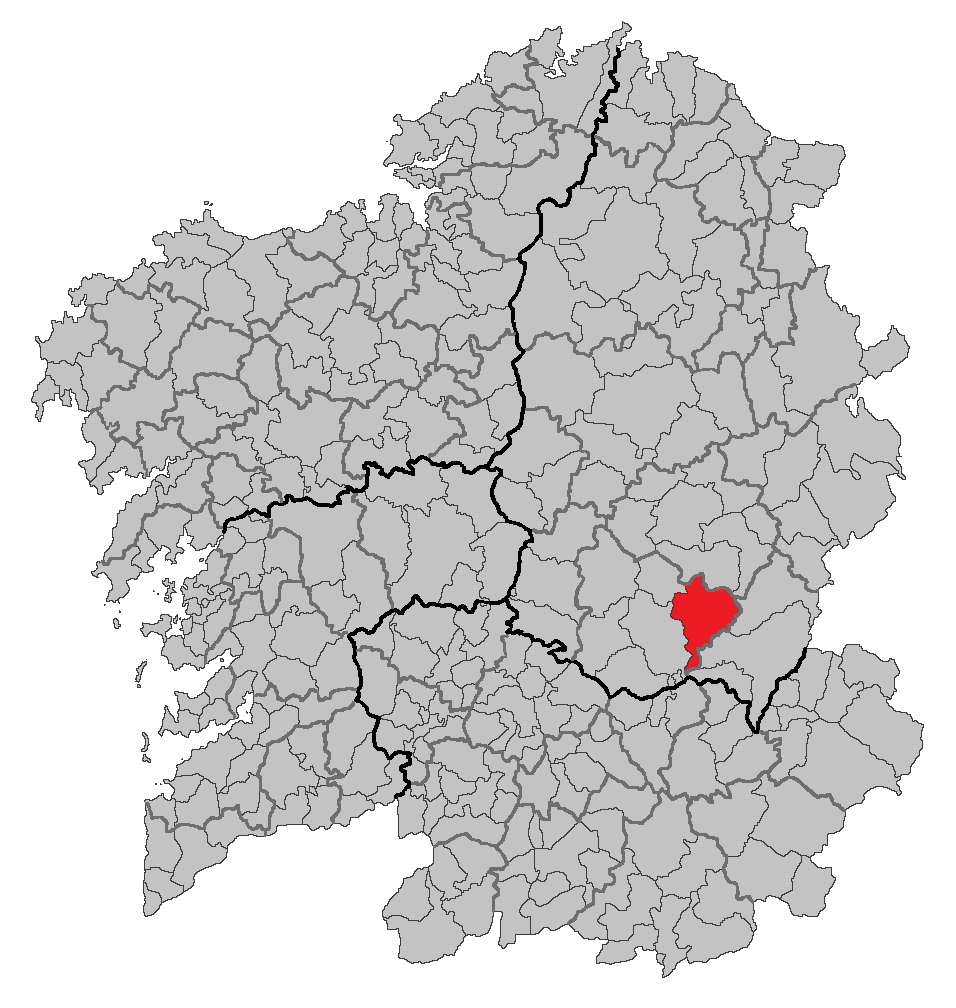
- Location of A Pobra do Brollón.

- Location in Spain
- Country: Spain
- Autonomous community: Galicia
- Province: Lugo
- Comarca: A Terra de Lemos

Government
  - Alcalde: José Luis Maceda Vilariño (BNG)

Population (2025-01-01)
  - Total: 1,610
- Demonym(s): brollonés, -a
- Time zone: UTC+1 (CET)
  - Summer (DST): UTC+2 (CEST)
- Postal code: 27330
- Website: Official website

A Pobra do Brollón is a municipality in the province of Lugo in the autonomous community of Galicia, Spain. It belongs to the comarca of Terra de Lemos. It has a population of 2,066 (Spanish 2010 Census) and an area of 175 km^{2}.

It is bordered to the north by O Incio, to the south by Quiroga and Ribas de Sil, east to by Samos, Folgoso do Courel and Quiroga, and to the west by Monforte de Lemos and Bóveda.

It is located 62 kilometers from the provincial capital.

== Natural environment ==
=== Geography ===
The municipality of A Pobra do Brollón has an area of 174.8 km^{2}, located between the Valle de Lemos to the west and the Sierra del Caurel to the east. It is characterized by its mountainous topography in the eastern half. The area include the following mountains:

- Alto da Veneira
- Mioteira
- O Home Grande
- Cerro de Pereira
- Covallo
- Moncai

The main rivers are el Cabe, el Saa and el Rubin, which form small and deep valleys. All the rivers in the western half form part of the river basin of the Cabe river while those of the eastern half belong to the basin of the Lor river, making a physical edge by a strip in the east. In the land surrounding the Sil river is a small bank. The most important plant species are pine, chestnut, poplar, gorse, blackberry and Common Broom.

=== Hydrography ===
The hydrographic network is located within the basin of the Cabe river, which drains the western part of municipality in the NE-SW direction and forms part of the Minho-Sil river basin. The main rivers and streams are:

- Rivers: Cabe, Lor, Saa, Lebrón, Rubín, Loureiro-Mazo.
- Streams: As Lamelas, Forgas, A Barca, Arquillido, A Silvela, Picarrexo, Trasmonte.

=== Climate ===
The climate in the west is oceanic-continental and to the east the climate is oceanic-mountain, a result of a higher altitude. In the west, temperatures are mild. The winters are cold with heavy freezing and the summers are hot. The area within the domain of the mountain climate has average temperatures around 11 °C with large temperatures ranging from 12° to 15°. The months of maximum rainfall are from November to March and the minimum rainfall from July to August.

=== Vegetation ===
The vegetation consists of species such as: pine, chestnut, oak, poplar, while the shrub type is represented by the gorse, and Common Broom, amongst others.

== Demography ==
Found: INE Archiv

== Parishes ==
- Abrence (San Xoán)
- Barxa de Lor (Santa Mariña)
- Canedo (San Miguel)
- Castroncelos (Santiago)
- Castrosante (Santa Mariña)
- Cereixa (San Pedro)
- Eixón (San Xurxo)
- Ferreiros (San Salvador)
- A Ferreirúa (San Martiño)
- Fornelas (Santa Comba)
- Lamaigrexa (San Pedro)
- Liñares (San Cosme)
- Óutara (Santa María)
- Parada dos Montes (Santa Einés)
- Pinel (Santa María)
- Piño (Santa María)
- A Pobra do Brollón (San Pedro)
- Saa (Santa María)
- Salcedo (San Xoán)
- Santalla de Rei (Santalla)
- Veiga (San Xián)
- Vilachá (San Mamede)
