= O Saviñao =

Coordinates: 42°42′30″N 7°37′00″W

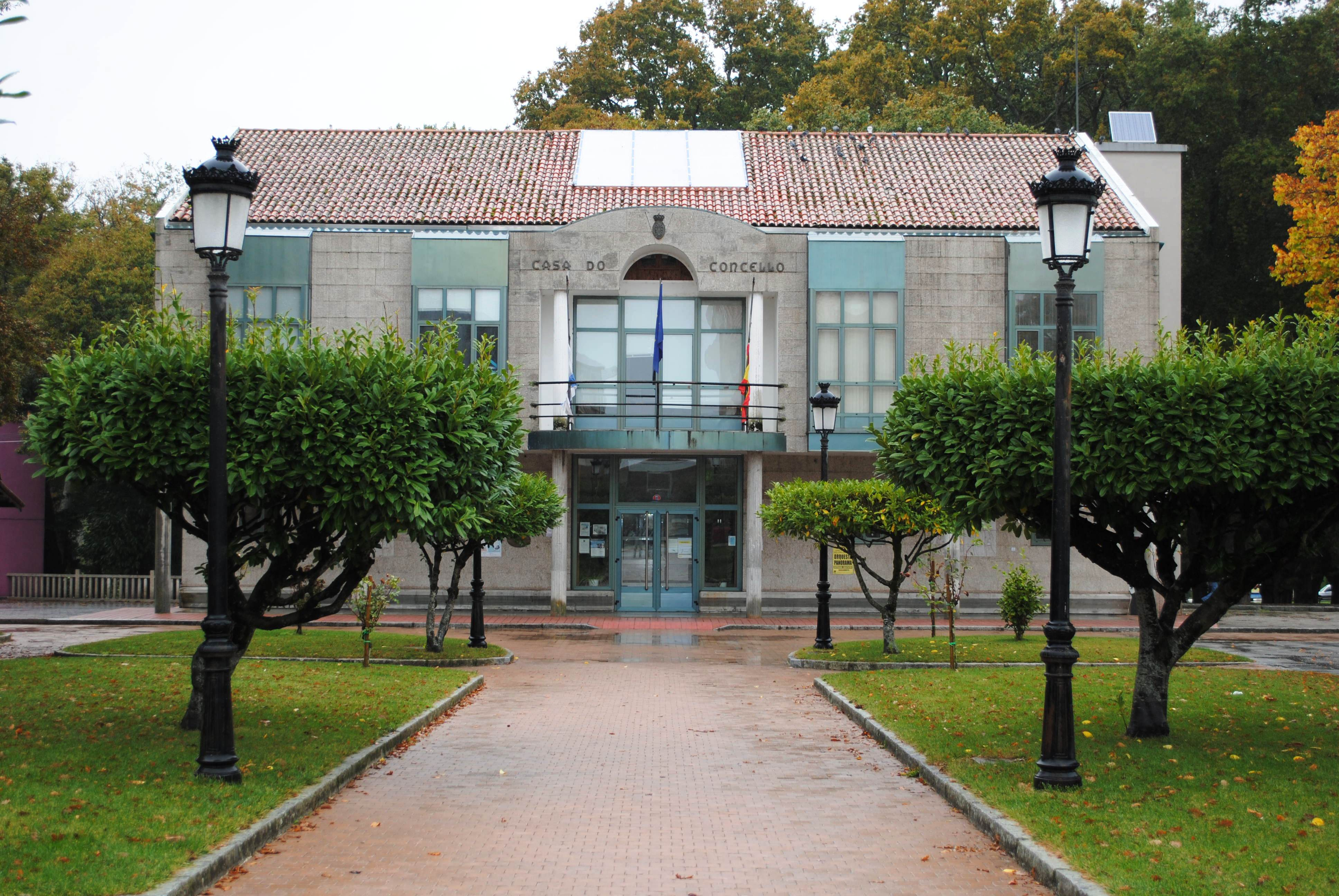

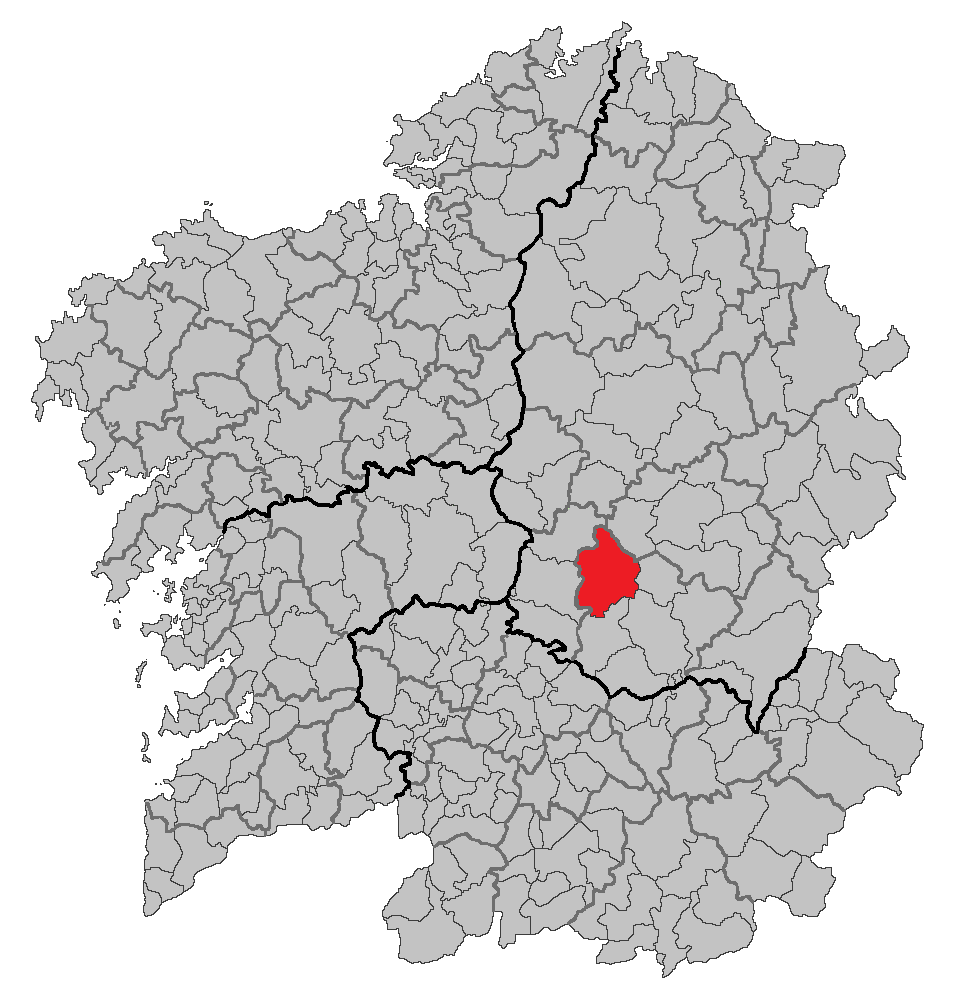
O Saviñao within Galicia

O Saviñao's flag

O Saviñao's coat of arms

O Saviñao (Galician pronunciation: [ʊ saβiˈɲaʊ]) is a concello (council) in the province of Lugo, Galicia, belonging to the district of Terra de Lemos. The main town for the council is Escairón.

== Situation ==
The municipality O Saviñao is located in the Ribeira Sacra, in the district of Terra de Lemos, located in the southern part of the province of Lugo, bordered by the municipalities of Pardela and Taboada to the north, Pantón to the south and east, Monforte de Lemos and Vault and west Taboada and Chantada. The average altitude is 600 meters above sea level, crossing the area are the rivers Río Sardiñeira, Rio Saviñao, Rio Pez, Rio Barrantes and Rio Porriño. The river Miño is the longest river in Galicia and forms the western boundary of the councils area.

The council consist of 29 parishes, its capital, Escairón, with approximately one thousand inhabitants, the second town is Currelos, the economy of the town is mainly agricultural, also has dairies, bodegas (wineries), construction, etc. Plus the odd rural tourism business in the form of Casas Rurais. Escarión also has a very small industrial estate.

Markets (ferias) are held in Escairón on the 8th and 9th of every month and in Currelos on the 26th of the month.

== Heritage ==
The municipality of O Saviñao possesses a wealth of valuable heritage. In archaeology include the Anta-Abuime or field Mamoas of Abuime. This is a small burial chamber situated about four kilometres to the north of Escairón.

There are numerous castros (Celtic settlements) in this council, including Abuime de Castro, Castro de Torre in Freán, Castro de Illón in Licin, Castro da Portela in Diomondi, Mourelos de Castro, Castro Besta in Vilelos and Castro de Villacaiz. The Villacaiz and Abuime are the most visible.

== Architecture ==
Examples of the varied architecture of churches and other religious buildings in the area include

- The Pazo in Vilelos, L-shaped, with a chapel plus shields of Ulloa. The founders of the Pazo were Don Juan Gonzalez de Ulloa and Doña Catalina Lopez of Sober. It is not open to the public.
- The Pazo Arxeriz of which was owned by Juan Lopez Súarez (Xan of Forcados), its first founder was Gonzalo Raxo, Knight of the Order of Santiago in the mid-sixteenth century. It has a square and highlights its two escutcheons located on the north facade of Pazo; has many units that were annexed recently restored. It is now a museum, see links below.
- Pazo das Cortes, near the Romanesque church of San Pelayo of Diomondi is U-shaped and has an attached chapel dedicated to Our Lady of the Assumption. There are shields of Somoza, from the eighteenth century. Not open to the public-
- Casa da Abbey of St. Stephen Ribas do Minho, is surrounded by a stone wall and is accessed by a portalón with semicircular arch, is rectangular and a small chapel outside. Not open to the public.

In addition to the above listed pazos are the following, which are of minor note: Pazo of Lamaquebrada in Fión, Pazo de Casadonas in Licin, Pazo de Fraguas in Louredo, Casa Grande Mosiños, etc. None of which are open to the public.

There are several churches of note. All are in the Romanesque style of architecture. The most important is Santo Estevo de Ribas de Miño. This monastery was constructed in the 12th century. It is said the same stonemason (Master Mateo) that designed the Portico da Gloria for the Cathedral in Santiago de Compostela designed this building too, but there is no basis for this tradition. The main door does resemble the Portico, but in a smaller version, with artistic connections to the portals of San Xoan de Portomarin and the cathedral of Ourense. The unusual western crypt is also said to resemble the one in Santiago. The living quarters and cloisters no longer remain. The church has the largest rosetón (round) window in Spain. After the decay of some parts of the monastery the stones were used to build village houses. The church is still used today for wedding, funerals, baptisms and mass. Nearby is the Romanesque church of the village of Diomondi. It is dedicated to San Pelayo, and an inscription of 1170 on the interior of the tympanum of the west portal dates the setting of the lintel. The sculptural decoration at Diomondi is related to Lugo Cathedral, and the same masons worked at San Pedro de Portomarin where a faded inscription on the west tympanum records the date of 1182 for the church's consecration.

The only building of military architecture is the tower Candaira in Rebordaos, is the thirteenth century with a square of 9.81 by 9.94 metres, consists of three floors, the upper floor is the battlements. The original owner of the tower was Don Francisco de Quiroga Taboada Garza and Alvarez de Castro. Not open to the public.
