= Froylan =

Froylan or Froylán is a masculine given name and a surname. Notable people with the name include:

- Francisco Reus-Froylan, Bishop of Puerto Rico
- Froylán Gutierrez (born 1998), American actor and singer
- Froylán Ledezma, Costa Rican footballer
- Froylan D. Salinas, American politician
- Froylán Turcios, Honduran writer, journalist and politician

== See also ==
- Froilan
