= Froy =

Froy is both a given name and a surname. It may refer to:

- Frøy Aagre (born 1977), Norwegian musician
- Martin Froy (1926–2017), British painter
- Miss Froy, fictional character in the book The Wheel Spins and the film The Lady Vanishes
- Froy Gutierrez (born 1998), American actor and singer
- Froy Salinas (1939–2021), American politician

== See also ==
- FRoY, or Federal Republic of Yugoslavia, the name of Serbia and Montenegro from 1992 to 2003
