= Rajo Jack =

American racing driver

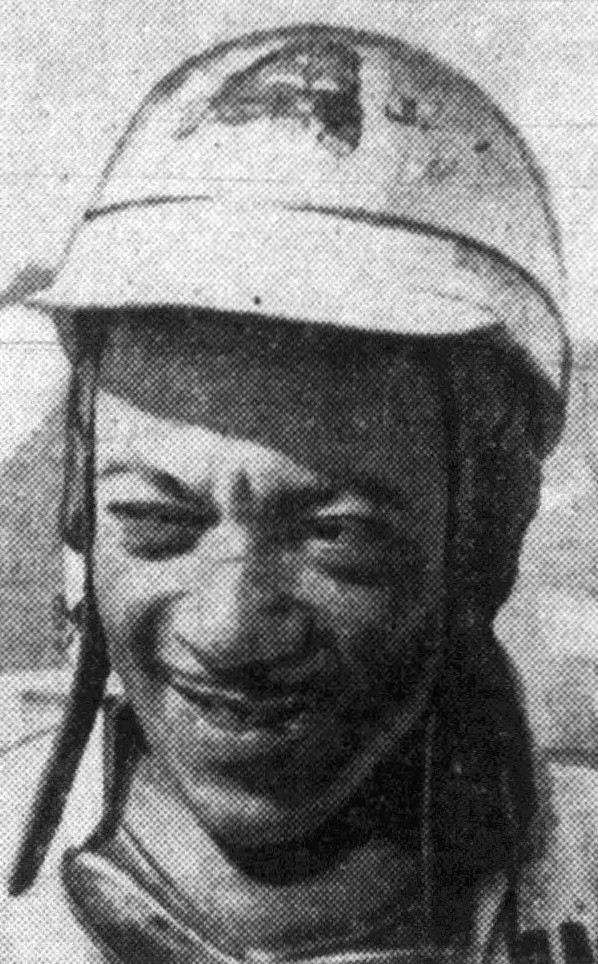
Rajo Jack, circa 1941

Dewey Gatson, better known as Rajo Jack or his pseudonym Jack DeSoto, (July 28, 1905 – February 28, 1956) was an American racecar driver. He is known as one of the first African American racers in America. He won races up and down the West Coast of the United States in stock cars, midgets, big cars and motorcycles. Rajo Jack was inducted in the West Coast Stock Car Hall of Fame in 2003 and the National Sprint Car Hall of Fame in 2007.

== Early life ==
Rajo Jack was the oldest of six children. He was raised by his parents Noah Gatson and his mother Frances Scott in Tyler, Texas. Noah Gatson had steady work with a railroad, which kept his family in a better financial state than other African-Americans in Texas.

== Racing career ==
Dewey Gatson was hired by the Doc Marcell Medicine Show as a roustabout general laborer at 16 years old. Gatson quickly became known among his peers for his talent with mechanical devices, especially anything with wheels and an engine. Gatson modified a truck into a house car for the Marcell family. He later was put in charge of the show's fleet of twenty cars in St. Johns, Oregon. He began racing with moderate success in the early 1920s at the fairs that the Marcell family followed across the country. He raced under the name "Jack DeSoto". He later moved down to Pasadena, California, and worked for the Marcells until their company failed during the Great Depression.

Rajo Jack ran a match race against Francis Quinn in Vancouver, Washington in 1925. His seat fell out of the car as he took the green flag to start the event, and the event had to be canceled.

Gatson would soup up all of his own Model T Fords cars with Rajo cylinder heads. In the early 1930s, Rajo owner Joe Jagersberger named Gatson/Jack DeSoto his Los Angeles dealer and salesman, and the name "Rajo Jack" was born. Rajo Jack raced in many forms of motorsport and he used many kinds of engines. Rajo was a mechanic for Quinn at Legion Ascot Speedway. After Quinn died, Rajo was given his 225 cubic inch Miller engine.

On April 29, 1939 Rajo assessed his Miller engine which he had torn apart while repairing its main bearing. Parts were strewn around his garage. He needed to drive 400 miles (640 km) to Oakland for a 100 mile (160 km) race the next day. He called his wife Ruth to get ready for the drive to Oakland. She thought that he meant to get ready for the ride. She came outside to find him backing up their truck to the garage. They wheeled the car onto the truck. Rajo put the pieces onto the bed of the truck, grabbed the necessary tools, and said "You drive, I'm going to put this thing together on the road". He put the engine together while she drove. He got it done just in time for qualifying. He qualified third and finished second in the race.

Rajo Jack raced in the American Racing Association (ARA). He finished third in the season points in 1941. While he raced mainly on the West Coast, he traveled as far east as Dayton, Ohio for a fair that year. On his drive back west, he stopped to race at the Steele County fair in Owatonna, Minnesota. He was badly injured along with Bayliss Levrett in an accident that claimed the life of Wayne "Boots" Pearson. Rajo received a compound fracture of his leg and a severe concussion.

He occasionally did stunts on motorcycles. He had an accident in one of his stunts, and he became blind in his right eye.

All racing in the United States halted for World War II. After the war, Rajo Jack flipped while racing at San Diego Speedway in 1947. He was struggling to race in the middle of the pack. He retired shortly after the flip, but returned to racing, primarily with the American Racing Association (ARA) in Northern California, but also made a sojourn to the Midwest. He was barely able to bend his arm as the result of numerous racing injuries, and he had difficulty reaching the steering wheel. His last race apparently came when Northern California sprint cars made a visit to Honolulu Stadium in Hawaii in early 1954.

=== Major race wins ===
In 1934, Rajo Jack won a 200-mile (320 km) stock car race at Silvergate Speedway in San Diego. He won a 100 mile race at San Jose Speedway on March 17, 1935.

Jack won a 200 mile stock car race at Mines Field in Los Angeles on October 25, 1936. He took the lead in lap 56 on the 1 mile B-shaped course. He won the race by two laps with a time of 3 hours, 47 minutes, and 4–10 seconds. He also won a 300 mile stock car race at Oakland Speedway on May 30, 1937.

Other wins include a co-win as a relief driver for Tex Peterson in the 1939 500 mile race at Oakland Speedway, and several wins at Southern Ascot Speedway in South Gate, California. Among his wins at Southern Ascot were a 300 lap stock car race on October 1, 1939 and a 250 lap stock car race on June 16, 1940, both driving a Citroën.

== Awards ==
He was inducted in the West Coast Stock Car Hall of Fame as a member of the class of 2003.

== Death ==
Rajo sold auto parts, raced, and worked as a mechanic until he died on February 27, 1956. He was travelling with his brother when he died of heart failure in Kern County, California. The name on his death certificate read Rajo Jack. He is buried in the Lincoln Memorial Cemetery in Carson, California.

== Racism ==
Rajo Jack raced in a time of racial prejudice, and he was frequently a target of racism. He raced long before Rosa Parks refused to give up her seat to make room for a white passenger, and over a decade before Jackie Robinson first played in Major League Baseball. When he first started racing, he would duck his head behind the cowling when someone was taking a picture. He was respected among his peers for his talent, so he was generally allowed access to racing circles in spite of his color. Drivers often drove between tracks as a group. One restaurant owner refused to serve Rajo Jack. The other drivers said that they all would be served or they all would leave. The owner served all of them. The same thing frequently happened at motels and the drivers would band together. He often claimed to be a Portuguese man named Jack DeSoto to be able to race. Other times he claimed that he was a Native American to get around the color barrier. But fans' acceptance had limits. His wife Ruth had to be with him every time he won because she would do the trophy girl's job: give him the trophy and a kiss. He once let the other driver win in a two lap match race because he knew that he couldn't kiss the white trophy girl.

Jack was considered a true "outlaw" racer since he never raced in the AAA, the prominent racing association of the time in the United States. Only AAA members raced in the Indianapolis 500, the premiere race in the country. He claimed that he would never pass the physical examination because he was blind in one eye. His fellow racers knew it was because of his skin color.
