= Froilan =

Froilan or Froilán is a masculine given name. Notable people with the name include:

- Froilán de León, Catholic saint
- Felipe de Marichalar y Borbón, known as Froilán, Spanish noble
- Froilan Baguion, Filipino basketball player
- Froilan Calayag, Filipino painter
- Froilán Díaz, Argentine footballer
- Froilan Quiño, Filipino politician
- Froilan Saludar, Filipino boxer
- Froilán Tantaleán, Peruvian sports shooter
- Froilan Tenorio (1939–2020), Northern Mariana Islander politician
- Froilán Varela, Uruguayan actor
- José Froilán González, Argentine racing driver
- Ricardo Froilán Lagos Escobar, Chilean lawyer, economist and politician (president)

== See also ==
- Froylan
- Froilano
- Fruela
