= Fruela Díaz =

Fruela (or Froila) Díaz (died 1119), known in contemporary sources as Froila Didaci or Didaz, was a nobleman in the Kingdom of León, the dominant figure in the centre of the realm during the late reign of Alfonso VI and the early reign of Urraca. A man of great private wealth who expanded his landholdings through numerous purchases, he was able to marry royalty and maintain good terms with his sovereigns of León as well as the rulers of Galicia and Portugal, whose territories lay immediately to the west of his area of influence. He also founded a hospital, a traveller's inn and a settlement that grew into a town. His lands raised some of the most valuable horses in Spain, he was buried in the royal pantheon of the kings of León, and his high rank—highest in the kingdom after the king and the rulers of Galicia and Portugal—is remembered in the most famous of cantares de gesta.

== Origins and service to Raymond of Galicia ==
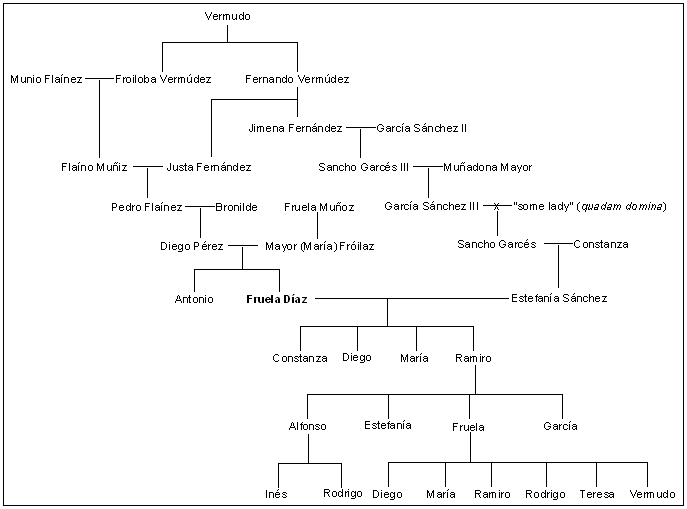
Fruela Díaz's family tree.

Fruela's origins lay in the Asturias, although his parentage is nowhere explicitly stated in surviving sources. Ramón Menéndez Pidal believed that Fruela was the brother of Jimena Díaz, wife of Rodrigo Díaz de Vivar, but this is unlikely. In fact Fruela's wife was the sister of Ramiro Sánchez, husband of Rodrigo's daughter Christina. It has been suggested that Fruela was a son of Diego Ansúrez and thus a nephew of Pedro Ansúrez, but this hypothesis has little to recommend it besides the patronymic Díaz ("son of Diego"). Fruela's father was probably Diego Pérez, a son of Pedro Flaínez and Bronilde. His mother was Mayor (María) Fróilaz, daughter of Froila Múñoz. A charter of the Cathedral of Oviedo, dated 5 April 1078, reads in part: "I, Mayor Fróilaz, known as María, at the same time with my sons named Fruela Díaz and Antonio Díaz, who are sons of Diego Pérez and grandsons of Count Pedro Flaínez ..."

The earliest surviving record of Fruela dates to 1069. His elder brother, Antonio, died young and Fruela, as the only surviving male child, inherited his father's estates. The archives of Fruela's branch of the Flagínez family were preserved in the monastery of Santa María de Oteros de las Dueñas, the only such case of a noble family's records being preserved from the Spanish high Middle Ages. On top of this is conserved in the tumbo of the Cathedral of Santa María in León (doc. 11, fol. 83) a brief genealogy of Antonio and Fruela, then children, as part of a diploma whereby their mother donated the monastery of San Pedro de Valdoré to the cathedral in December 1073.

Fruela served Count Raymond of Galicia as majordomo, the highest court official, from 1094 to 1096 at least, and perhaps as late as 1106. He may have held the post throughout Raymond's countship (1090–1107), but insufficient surviving documentation does not allow the case to be proven. An analysis of the charters he confirmed for Count Raymond shows that he "was a regular member ... of the entourage that gathered around [Raymond] during the latter's circuit of Galicia in the late springs and early summers", but not a fixture at Raymond's court. In the count's disputes with the king, Fruela openly took Raymond's side. Fruela was prominent enough at the royal court, however, confirming a third of all royal charters given during the latter part of Alfonso's reign.

== Fiefs of the crown ==
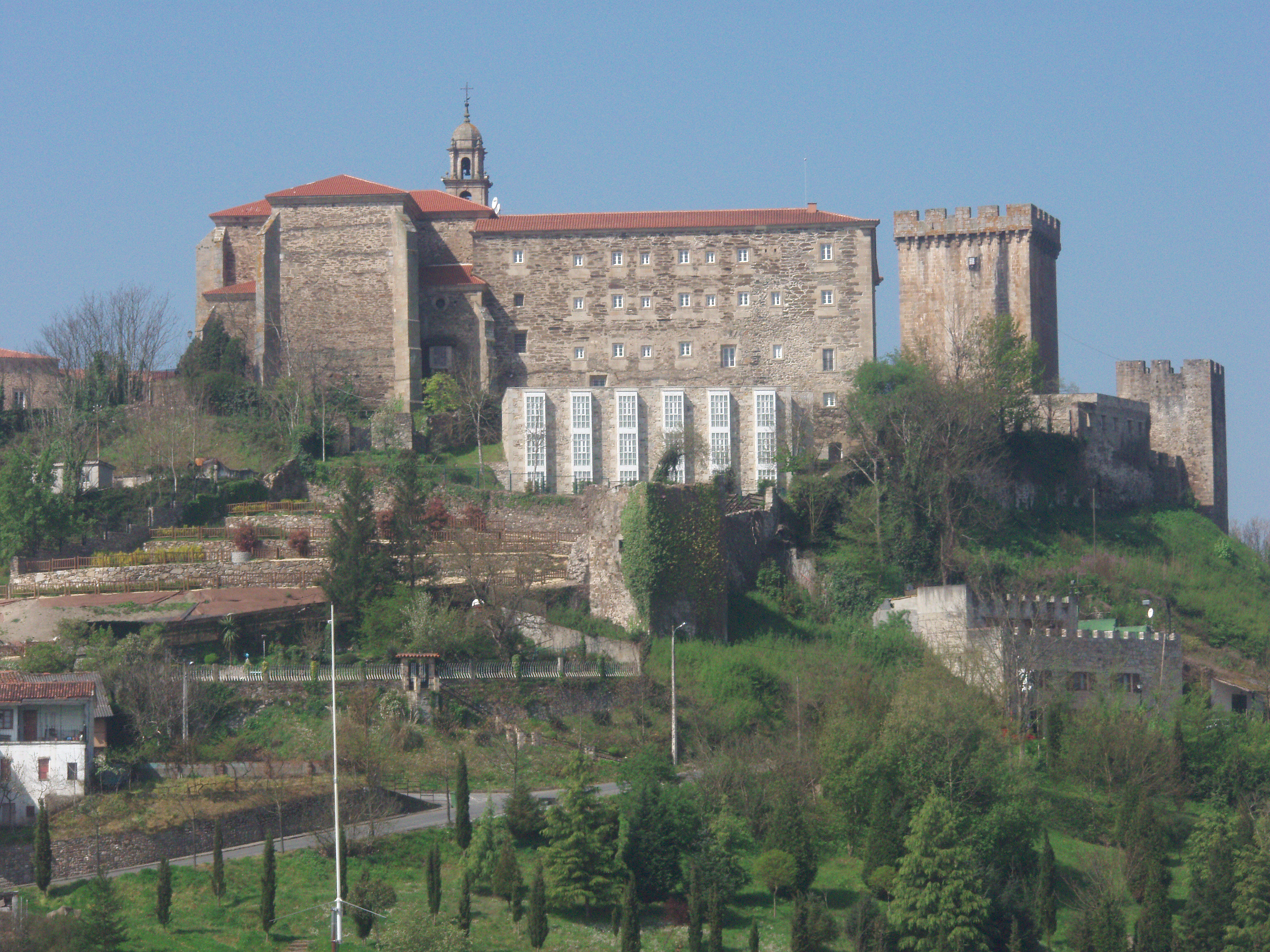
The fortified monastery of San Vicente del Pino sits on a hill overlooking Monforte de Lemos. Archaeological excavations in 2007 indicate that the Castro Dactonio likely stood on the same hill when Fruela founded the town at its foot in 1116.

Both of Fruela's grandfathers were counts and by 14 May 1087 he also held that rank. Not long thereafter, in 1091, he was granted the fief (tenencia) of Valdeorras in Galicia, which he held until 1104. Such tenencias were held ad imperandum, to be governed and could be revoked by the monarch at any time. They were distinct from the count's private holdings, lands ad possidendum, which he owned and which the monarch could not alienate. The only other fiefs he held for more than a year or two were Sarria (1098–1103), Larín (1102–06), and the important episcopal city of Astorga (1107–17). The rule of Astorga probably carried limited rights in the city itself but extensive powers in the surrounding region. It is with Astorga that Fruela is most commonly associated after 1107. On 10 April 1104, according to a royal charter now lost, Fruela and his wife founded a settlement at the foot of the castle called castro Dactonio in the fiefdom of Sarria on land owned by the monastery of San Vicente del Pino. This settlement became the town of Monforte de Lemos, which Fruela held as a tenencia until 1111, when it passed to Rodrigo Vélaz.

Late in his life Fruela briefly acquired the fiefs of Aguilar (1111–12), Riba de Esla (1113), and Cifuentes de Rueda (1117–19). He also governed the Bierzo for a time, probably in 1115. In 1116 he made a donation of land at Puerto de Pajares to the Augustinian canons of the collegiate church of Santa María at Arbas del Puerto. This land, in the mountains of the Asturias, was intended for the construction of a hostel for travellers, which operated until as late as 1835. The full text of the diploma has now been lost, and it is suspected that it may have included a fuller will and testament, since Fruela was then in his old age.

== Marriage and private dealings ==
Fruela married Estefanía Sánchez, daughter of Sancho Garcés, an illegitimate son of García Sánchez III of Navarre, and his wife Constance. She possessed lands in the Rioja, near Calahorra, but may have sold these in order to purchase land more near to her husband's estates. They were married towards 1085, and on 11 September 1087 Fruela gave his wife arras. Her royal pedigree was mentioned in a grant of land in Astorga they received from Henry of Portugal on 1 March 1112, which included the Torre Cornellera and ten sections of the city wall. She outlived her husband by at least ten years: on 18 April 1129 she granted a fuero to Villarmildo. The couple's children were Constance, Diego, María, and Ramiro.

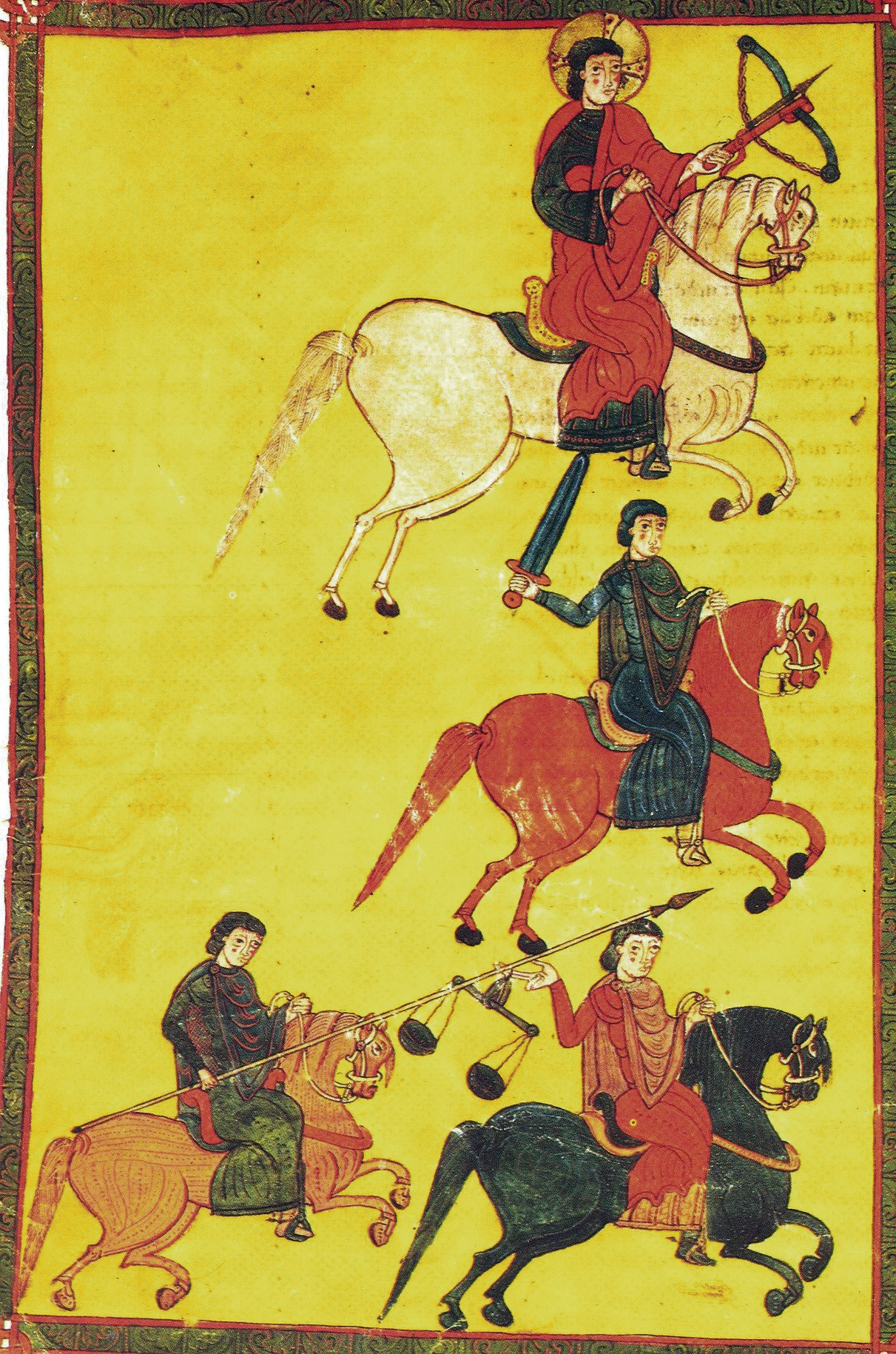
Fruela's patrimonial lands contained some of Spain's premier horse pastures, and he was able to give the queen a horse worth 5,000 solidi in 1116. The famous warhorse Bavieca was said, albeit wrongly, to have hailed from Fruela's lands. The above illustration is from c.1086.

Fruela and Estefanía were most active in acquiring property (gananciales) through private transactions between 1088 and 1113. With twenty-three such exchanges having left records, their case is one of the best preserved of its kind: private land transactions, especially aristocratic purchases from peasants, increased dramatically in Spain between the late tenth and early twelfth century. Some of the couple's early, eleventh-century property gains were of the form of loan repayments, though this type of transaction disappears from the record altogether in the twelfth century.

In 1118 a certain Martín Eitaz, convicted of murdering one of Fruela's servants, was forced to become his servant for life or until released by a payment.

== Service to Queen Urraca ==
Fruela was one of the magnates who witnessed the first recorded act of Queen Urraca, on 22 July 1109, and implicitly acknowledged her claim to have been granted "the whole kingdom" (regnum totum) by her father, Alfonso VI, shortly before his death. This important document Fruela signs as legionensium comes (count of León), a high-sounding title that was probably honorific and had long been associated with the Flagínez. On 17 November 1110 he signed a document as comes in terra de legione et in gralare (count in the land of León and in Grajal), perhaps a special authority associated with the breakdown of relations between Urraca and the King of Aragon, Alfonso the Battler, who was also her husband. In 1112 Fruela received a royal "gift" of estates at Ulvayo from the queen "for loyal service", and he repaid her generosity with the gift of a horse worth a magnificent 5,000 solidi, equivalent at the time to 5,000 sheep. A horse worth so much could only be destined for the royal stables and royal rider, the queen herself, and it illustrates Fruela's enormous personal wealth. In 1115, when Urraca and Alfonso were fighting for control of the important monastic site of Sahagún, Fruela was acting as count in Ceia (Ceón) just to the north. On 9 December 1117 Fruela witnessed the second charter issued by Urraca's son Alfonso Raimúndez, whom the Galicians had made co-ruler against her will in 1111. Although the language and the name of the notary may suggest that it has been interpolated, the document, made at Sahagún, refers to Alfonso with the title imperator (emperor).

== Death, burial and reputation ==
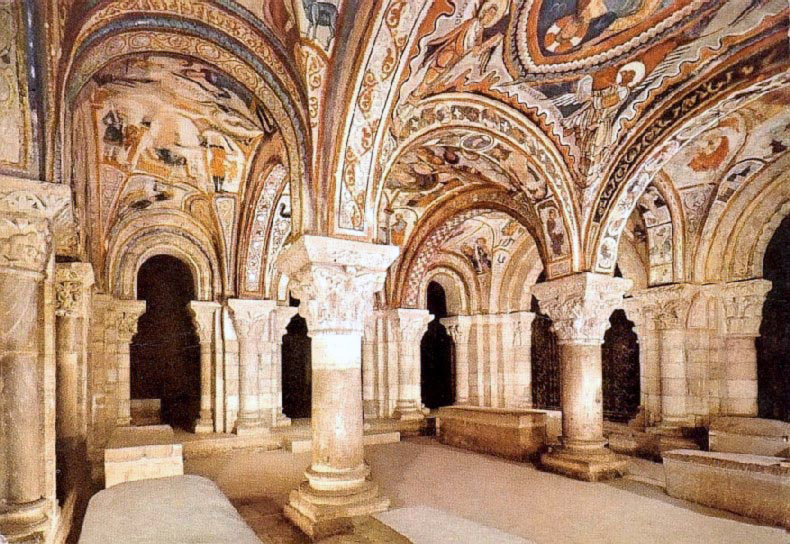
The Panteón wherein Fruela is reportedly interred has been called the "Sistine Chapel of Spanish Romanesque" for its well-preserved, high-quality ceiling frescoes.

When Fruela died in the summer of 1119 he passed Cifuentes on to his eldest son, Diego, who became alférez of Alfonso VII in 1137 and died prematurely in 1040, leaving a daughter, Estefanía Díaz, who was disinherited by her uncle, Ramiro, when she married without his will. Ramiro then received Cifuentes. In 1198 Cifuentes received a fuero from Ramiro's son, Froila Ramírez, and it remained with their family into the thirteenth century. Fruela's elder daughter Constance died in the flower of youth, while the younger, María, married twice: first to a Galician magante, Melendo Núñez, and second to the count Pedro Alfonso.

Fruela and Estefanía may have been buried in the Panteón de los Reyes in the church of San Isidoro de León amongst their relatives of the Flagínez clan. Prudencio de Sandoval claimed to find the sepulchres of "the countess Estefanía who endowed this church, and the count Don Fruela, a great knight in arms" among ten of their family in the third row of burials in either the main chapel or the Panteón (it is unclear which). The identifying inscriptions, however, were already illegible in the time of Manuel Risco, and today Sandoval's conclusions cannot be verified.

Fruela's posthumous reputation can be gauged from lines 3000–3006 of the Poema del Cid (c.1140), where he is placed in the second tier of nobility, immediately beneath Alfonso VI, Henry of Portugal, and Raymond of Galicia, all of whom he served in his long career. This is the beginning of the "Cortes de Carrión" passage:

| Llegaba el plazo, querien ir a la Cort, en los primeros va el buen rey don Alfonso, el conde don Anric y el conde don Remond: aqueste fue el padre del buen enperador: el conde don Fruella y el conde don Beltrán. Fueron y de su reino otros muchos Sabidores, de toda Castiella todos los meiores. | The time arrived, they wished to go to Court, among the first went the good king Alfonso, the count don Henry and the don Raymond: that one was the father of the good emperor: the count don Fruela and the count don Bertrand. They went and from the realm many other Wise Men, from all Castile all the greatest. |
