= Santalla de Rei =

Parish in Lugo province, Galicia, Spain

Coordinates: 42°35′26.64″N 07°25′4.73″W

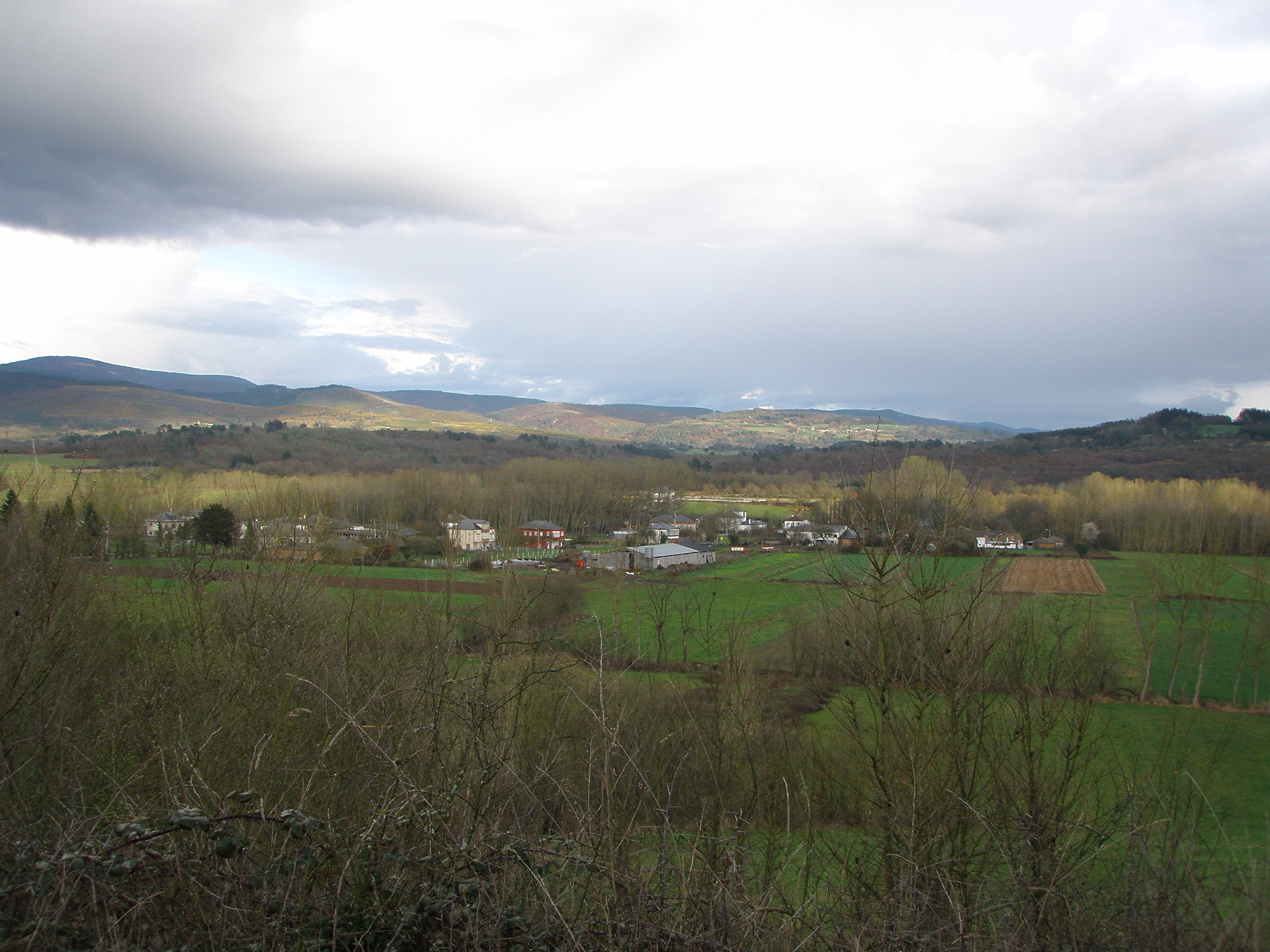
Santalla de Rei

Santalla de Rei is a parish in the municipality of A Pobra do Brollón, in the Province of Lugo in the Galicia region of north-west Spain.

It has a population of 37 inhabitants (2011), 16 men and 21 women, and an area of 1,75 km^{2}. In the last decades, the population has considerably decreased as in most of the parishes in the interior of Galicia.

There are two important buildings in Santalla: the church, built in the 17th century, and the Mill of Folla, in the Cabe river.

Santalla celebrates its festivity during the penultimate weekend in August and it is dedicated to the patron saint, Saint Lucia. Formerly, it was celebrated 26 September and it was one of the most important festivities in the province of Lugo.
