= Rodrigo de Castro Osorio =

Spanish cardinal and churchman (1523–1600)

His Eminence Rodrigo de Castro Osorio
- Cardinal, Archbishop of Seville
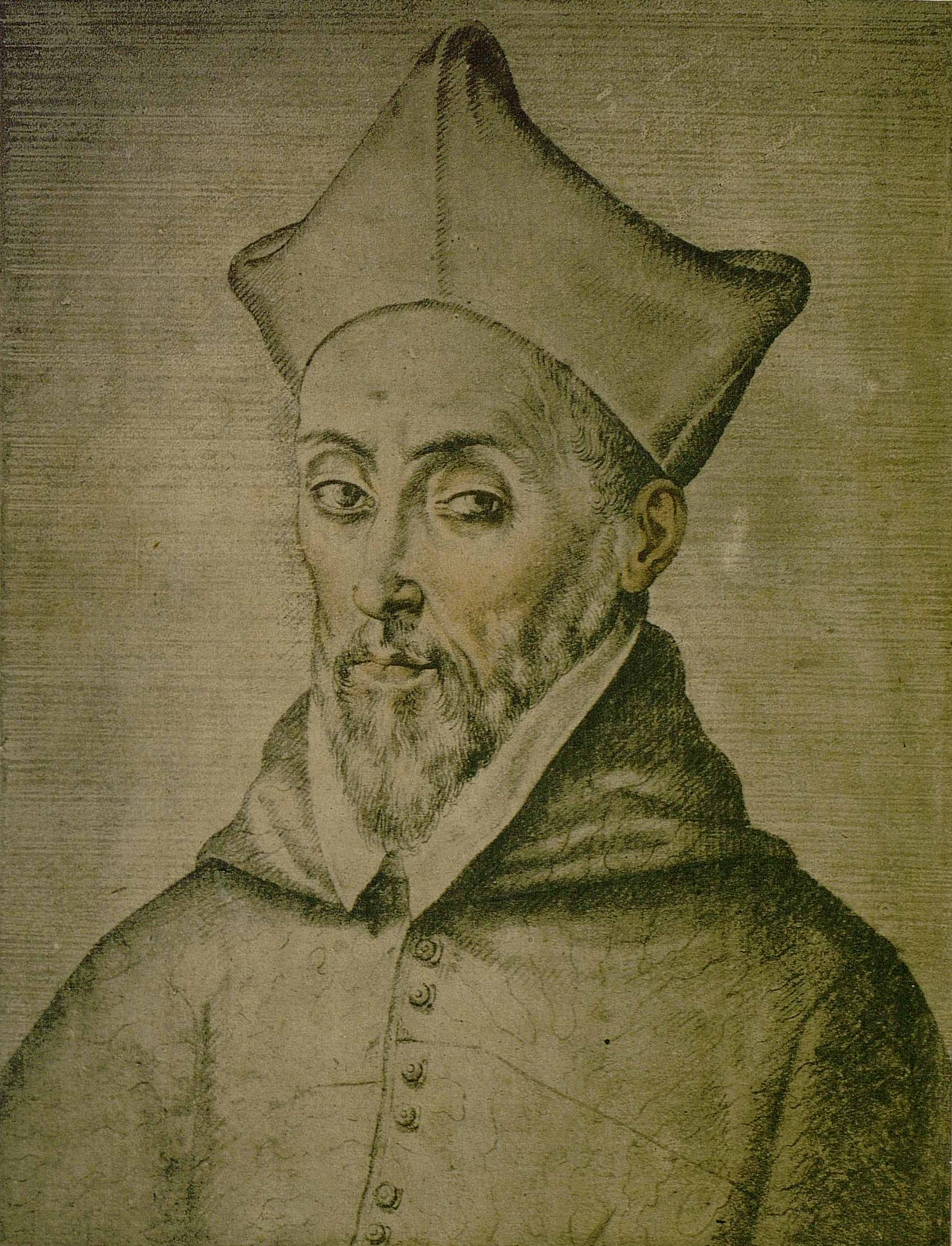
- Portrait of Rodrigo de Castro Osorio (c.1599), by Francisco Pacheco
- Church: Roman Catholic
- Appointed: 20 October 1581
- Installed: 15 February 1582
- Term ended: 20 September 1600
- Other post: Cardinal-Priest of Santi XII Apostoli (1585–1600)

Orders
- Ordination: 1559
- Consecration: 7 November 1574 by Gaspar de Quiroga y Vela
- Created cardinal: 12 December 1583 by Pope Gregory XIII
- Rank: Cardinal-Priest

Personal details
- Born: 5 March 1523 Valladolid, Crown of Castile
- Died: 20 September 1600 (aged 77) Seville, Spain
- Coat of arms: Rodrigo de Castro Osorio's coat of arms

Rodrigo de Castro Osorio (5 March 1523 – 20 September 1600) was a Spanish cardinal and churchman. He was Bishop of Zamora (1574–1578) and the Diocese of Cuenca (1578–1581), Archbishop of Seville, (1581–1600), a member of the Council of State of Spain and the Supreme Council of the Spanish Inquisition during the reign of Philip II of Spain. He was the Great-uncle of Pedro Fernández de Castro y Andrade, Conde de Lemos. He was closely linked to the city of Monforte de Lemos in Galicia, where he was the founder of the College of Our Lady of Antigua.

== Travels and studies ==
Popularly known as Cardinal Rodrigo de Castro, he was a renaissance man, considered by many authors as the last great ecclesiastical prince. His birthplace is disputed, with some authors arguing that he was born in Valladolid in 1523.

He studied canon law at Salamanca, where his brother, Pedro de Castro Lemos, who later became bishop of Cuenca (1553–1561), was named cardinal on 15 December 1583, by Gregory XIII. His restless spirit led him to travel across Flanders, Portugal, France, Italy, and Germany (Farinelli indicates his last trip, made in 1598, two years before his death, was by order of Philip III of Spain, to receive the Archduchess Margaret of Austria, future queen of Spain. This is a manuscript in folio, a collection of Jesuit Alenda registered No 365: "quel Cardinal my Jornada Mr. made from Seville to Madrid and what they pass until they left for Valencia, Year 1598 ")

== Features and charges ==
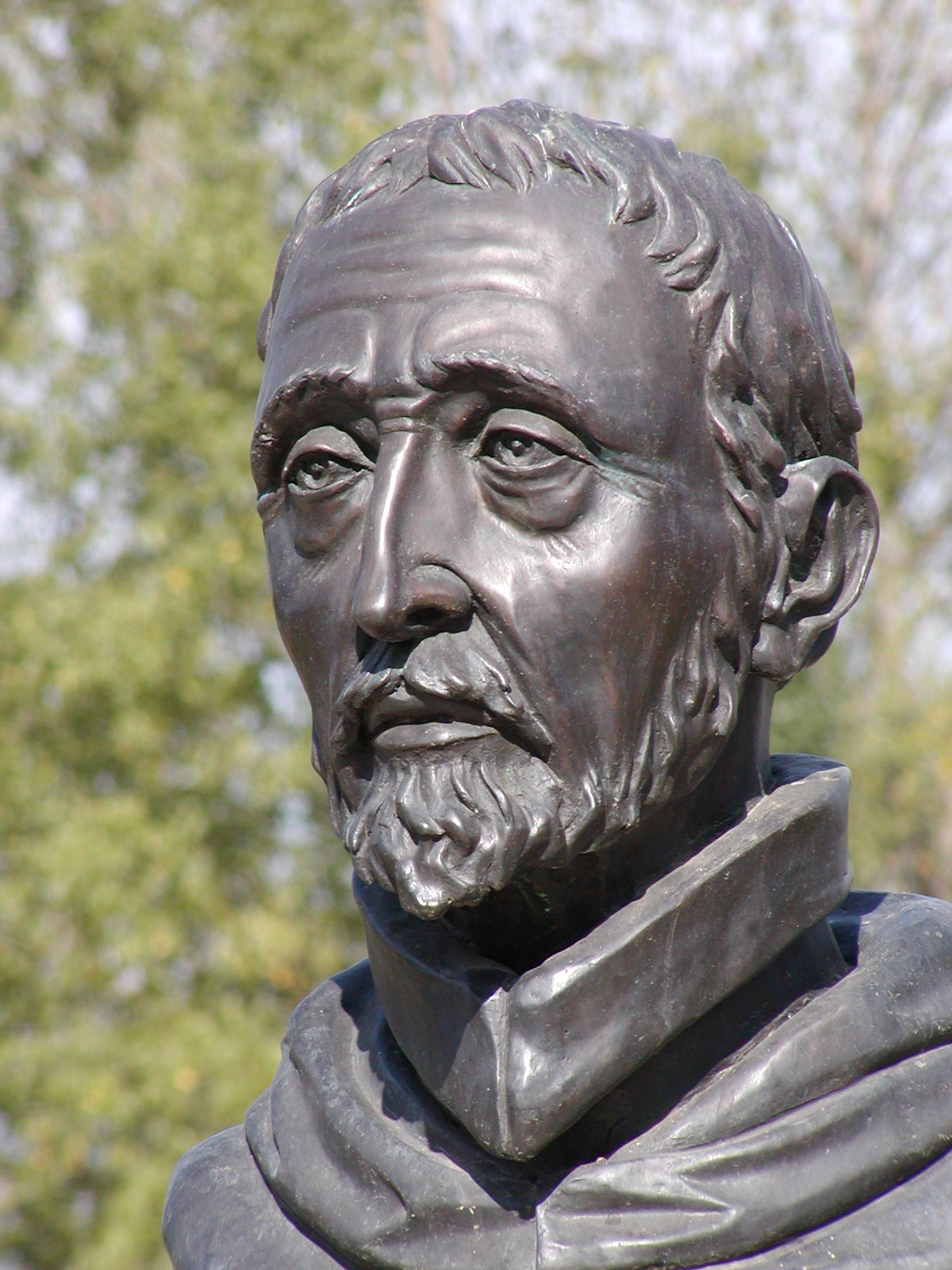
Bust dedicated to Cardinal Rodrigo de Castro, in the Parque dos Condes of Monforte de Lemos. Beneath the bust, the following inscription can be read: "Cardinal D. Rodrigo de Castro, 1523-1600, eternal gratitude of Monforte de Lemos."

Rodrigo de Castro was assigned an important role in the court of Philip II of Spain, where he was given important diplomatic missions, in addition to joining the Council of State and the Supreme Council of the Spanish Inquisition.

The cardinal was widely criticized for his taste for pomp and magnificence. He held expensive hunting parties, and large numbers of attendants and servants, besides the taste for luxury and art. He felt a great fondness for falconry, which is recorded by the "Treaty hunting Bird" by Pero López de Ayala, which is preserved at the Museum of Our Lady of Antigua, which belonged to his personal collection. Criticism also arose over the Archbishop of Seville to surround himself exclusively with servants and associates from Galicia.

His other traits were his generosity and humanism, creating a home for girls in difficult circumstances, struggling for humanization of treatment in prisons and aid to impoverished clergy aid for construction and improvement of temples, hospitals and hospices, as well as exercise patron of the arts.

The Maestro de capillo, Cristóbal de Medrano, a prominent musician in Castro's private music chapel, dedicated his Missa Voce Mea to the Cardinal-Archbishop Rodrigo de Castro, in 1594.

== College of Our Lady of Antigua and death ==
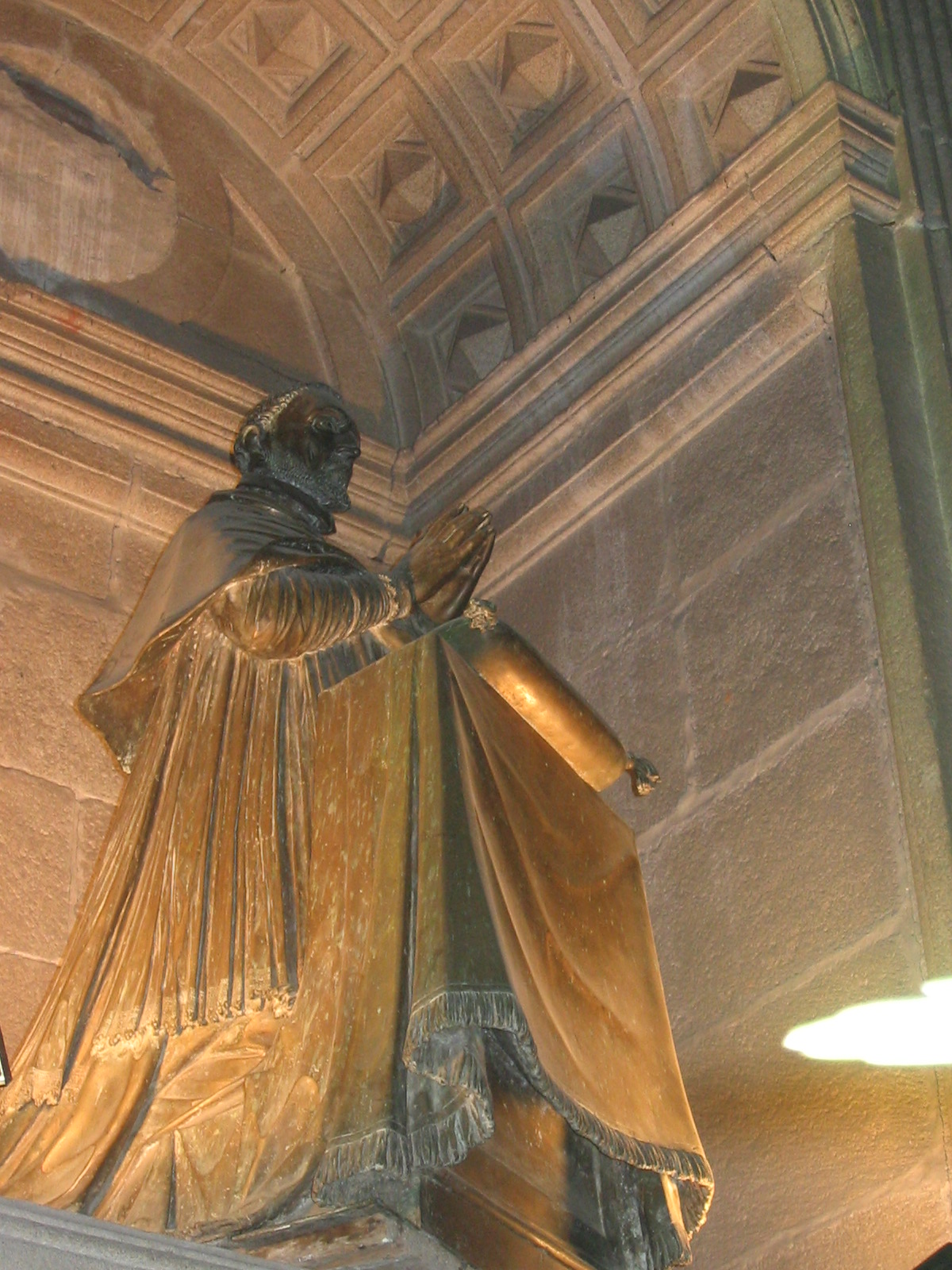
Statue of Rodrigo de Castro by Giambologna in the College of Nosa Señora da Antiga, Monforte de Lemos.

During convalescence from a serious illness, during 1592, Rodrigo decided to start the monumental work of the College of Our Lady of Antigua. Administered, at the beginning, by the Society of Jesus, had consolidated financially the College of Jerez de la Frontera, and contributed to the maintenance of the college-seminar of the British Jesuits from Seville and since its foundation, in addition to being instituted a protector of the congregations that the company had in that city, that of the Annunciation.

The school was his greatest legacy to Monforte de Lemos, making it one of the very few examples of Herrerian style in Galicia. It is named after the Virgin of Antigua, the object of devotion of the cardinal, and popularly named the Cardinal or Society College.

About this same time, the cardinal established a party in honor of the relics that had been treasured and preserved in the museum of the convent of Santa Clara (popularly known as the Poor Clares of Monforte). The Madrid writing school's endowment is awarded, and his nephew Pedro Fernández de Castro y Andrade would develop in his lifetime many of the features of humanism and love for the arts like his uncle.

He died in Seville in 1600. Leaving in his will the perpetual and hereditary Trustees of the college, referred to in these terms:For good and useful for my country; that patronage is bound and tied to the title of county of Lemos. It also provides for the transfer of his remains to Monforte de Lemos, which lie in the College of Our Lady of Antigua, under a statue made by Giambologna.

== External links and additional sources ==
- Cheney, David M. "Diocese of Zamora". Catholic-Hierarchy.org. (for Chronology of Bishops) ^{[self-published]}
- Chow, Gabriel. "Diocese of Zamora (Spain)". GCatholic.org. (for Chronology of Bishops) ^{[self-published]}

== Sources ==
- Los señores de Galicia (The Lords of Galicia), Eduardo Pardo de Guevara y Valdés, ISBN 84-89748-71-3
- History of Monforte de Lemos and Earth, Vazquez Germain, ISBN 84-241-9865-4
- Pedro Fernandez de Castro, O Great Conde de Lemos, Monica Martinez Garcia, ISBN 84-453-3763-7
- The Cardinal, Don Rodrigo de Castro, Armando Cotarelo Vallador, 2 vols. Editorial Teaching Spanish, Madrid, 1945.
