= Pantón =

Coordinates: 42°31′N 7°36′W

- Municipality
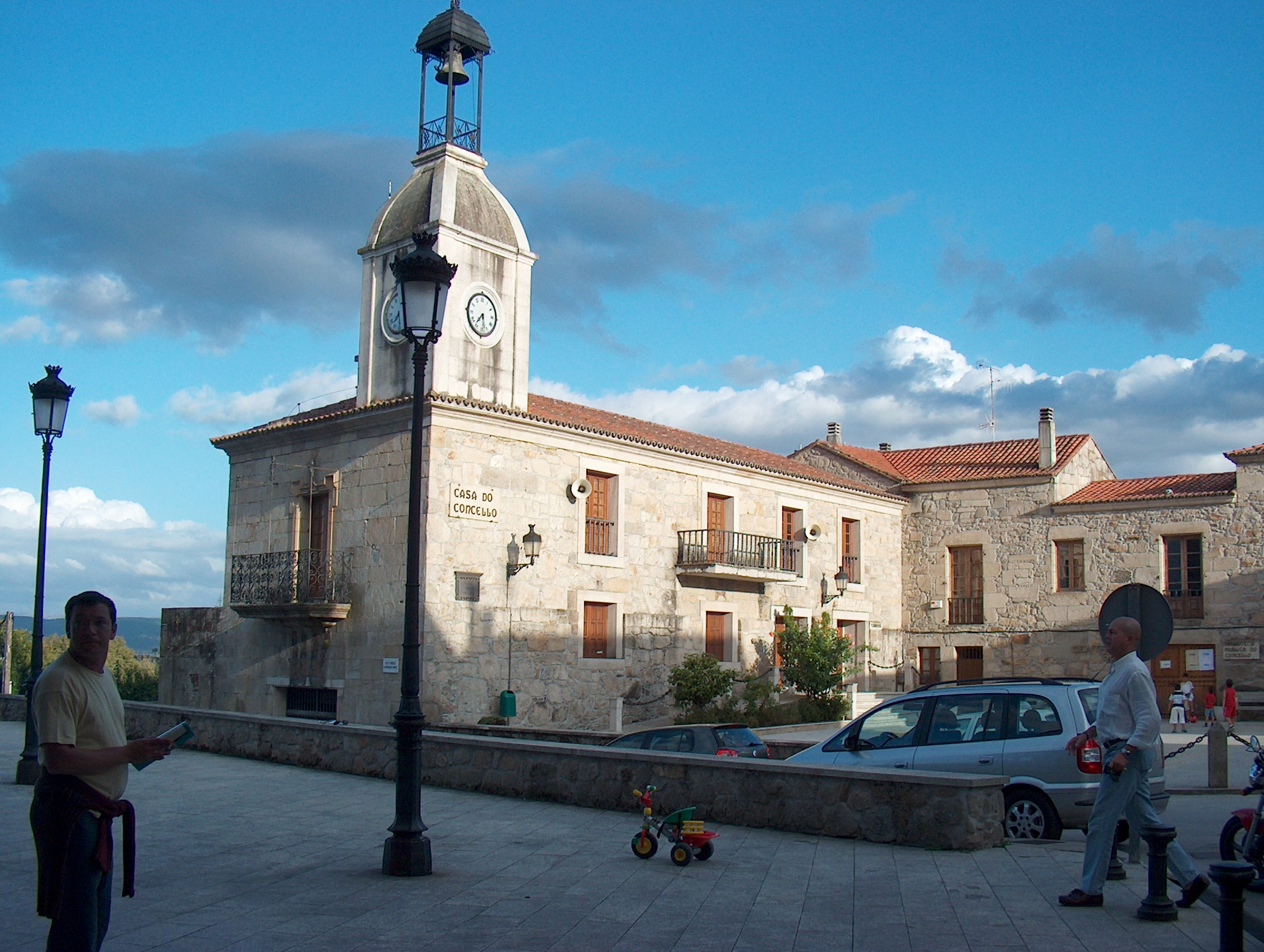
- Town hall.

- Coat of arms

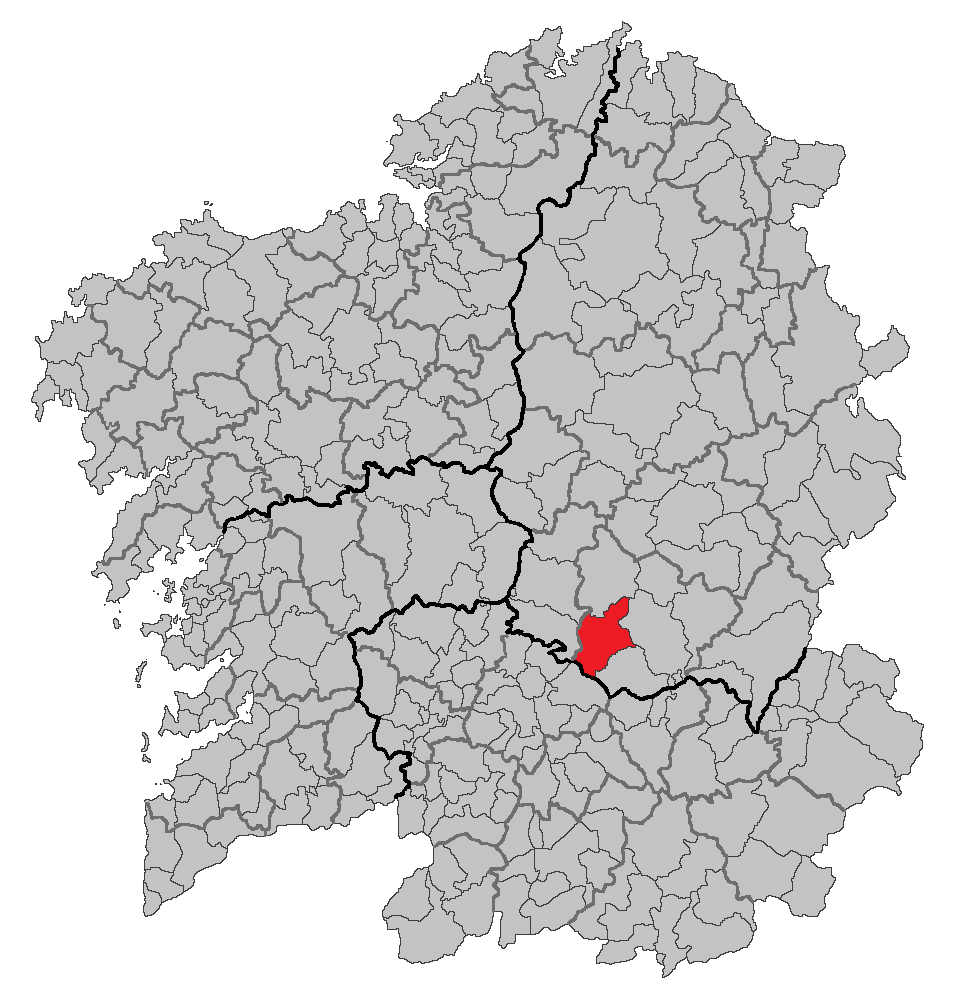
- Location of Pantón

- Location in Spain
- Country: Spain
- Autonomous community: Galicia
- Province: Lugo
- Comarca: A Terra de Lemos

Government
  - Alcalde: José Luis Álvarez Blanco (PPdeG)

Population (2025-01-01)
  - Total: 2,350
- Time zone: UTC+1 (CET)
  - Summer (DST): UTC+2 (CEST)
- Postal code: 27...
- Website: Official website

Pantón is a municipality in the province of Lugo, in the autonomous community of Galicia, Spain. It is located in a mountainous district in the comarca of Terra de Lemos, watered by the multiple rivers like the Miño, Cabe and Sil. Its population in 2002 was 3,377.

Livestock is extensively reared, and large quantities of wheat, wine, oats, and potatoes are produced. The other major industries are distilling and linen manufacture. The nearest railway station is 6 mi. east, at Monforte de Lemos.
