= Sober, Lugo =

Coordinates: 42°28′N 7°36′W

Sober
- Municipality
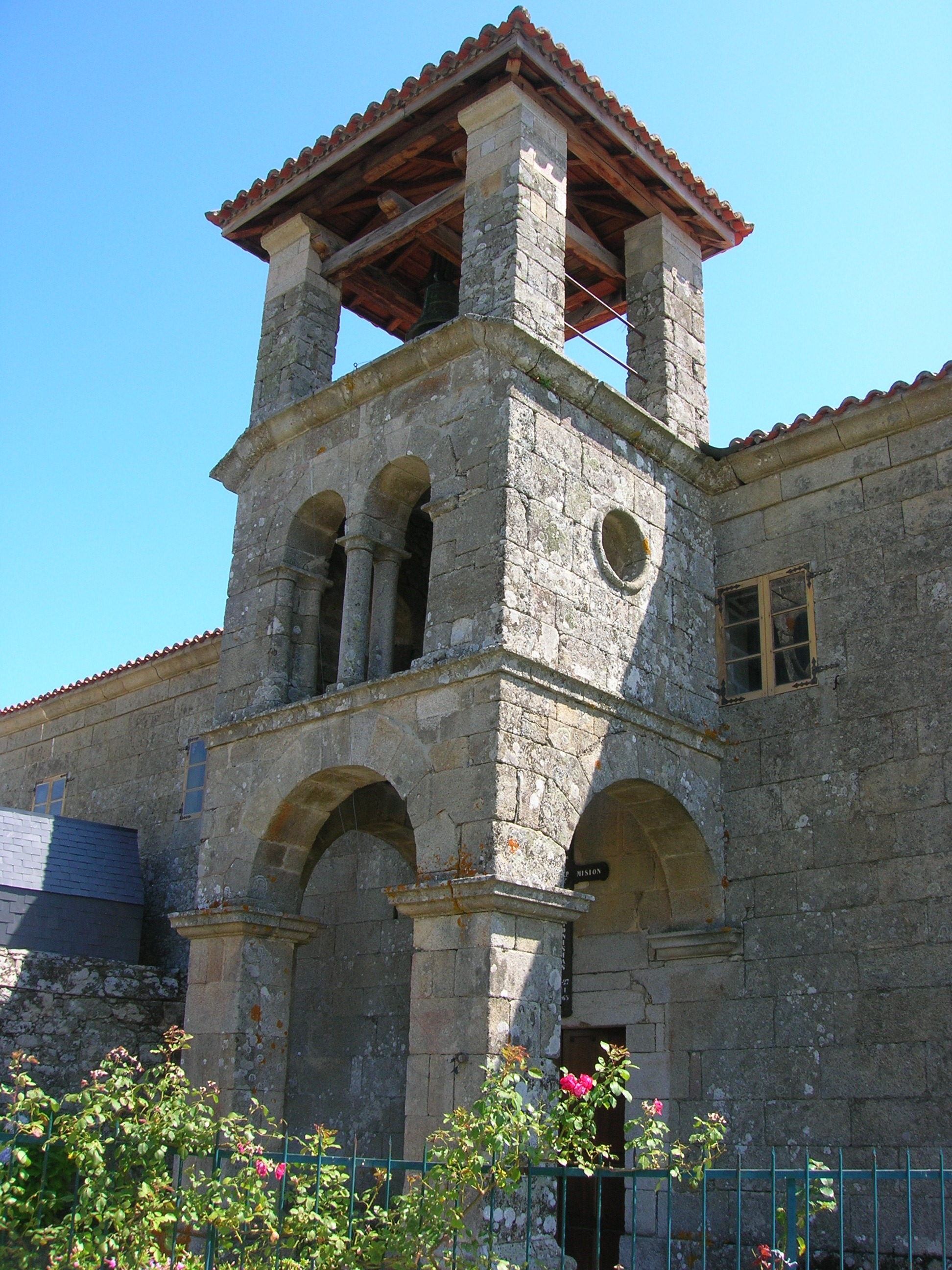
- Saint Michael's church in Rosende, Sober.

- Coat of arms

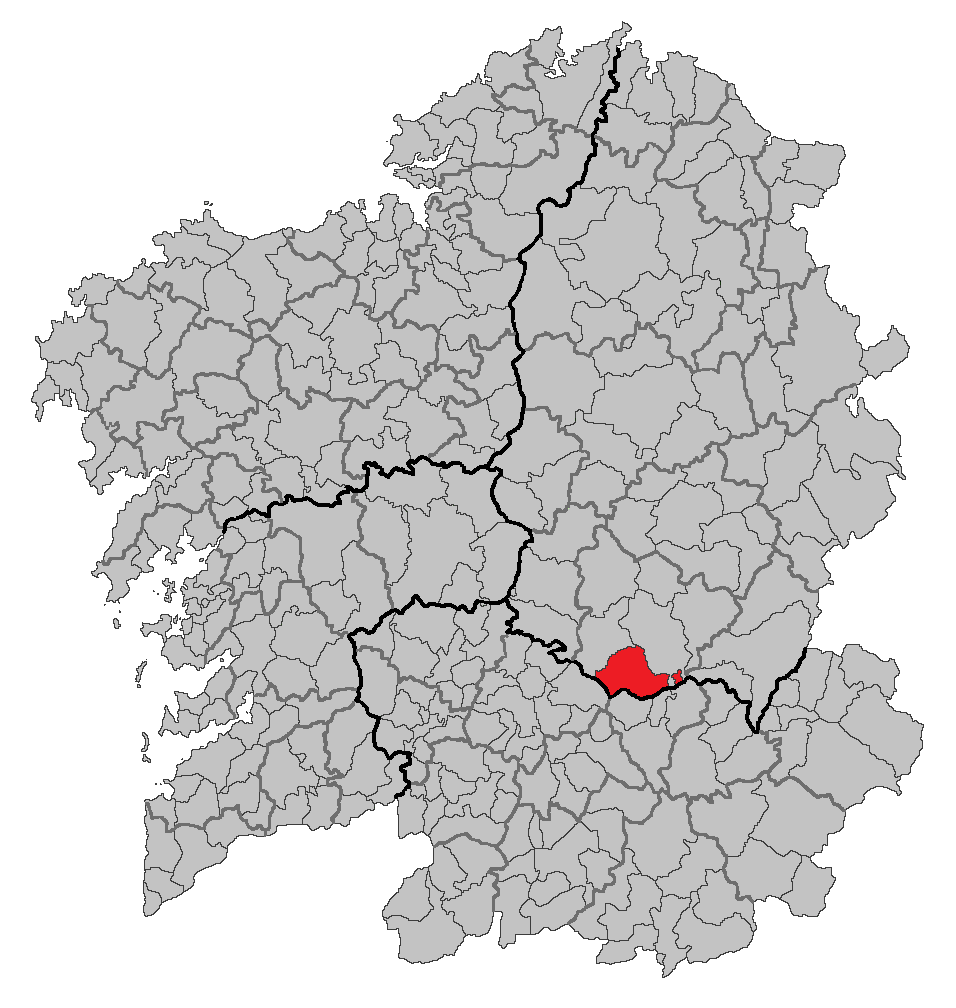
- Location of Sober

- Location in Spain
- Country: Spain
- Autonomous community: Galicia
- Province: Lugo
- Comarca: A Terra de Lemos

Government
  - Alcalde: Luis Fernández Guitián (PPdeG)

Population (2025-01-01)
  - Total: 2,090
- Demonym(s): soberés, -a
- Time zone: UTC+1 (CET)
  - Summer (DST): UTC+2 (CEST)
- Postal code: 27460
- Website: Official website

Sober is a municipality in the province of Lugo, in the autonomous community of Galicia, Spain. It belongs to the comarca of Terra de Lemos, being part of the local region of Ribeira Sacra.
