= María Dolores Acevedo =

Spanish writer (1932–1998)

- Born: María Dolores Acevedo y Vázquez; 1932; Monforte de Lemos, Lugo, Spain
- Died: 1998 (aged 65–66); León, Spain
- Occupation: writer
- Writing career
- Pen name: May Miller
- Language: Spanish
- Genres: romance novel; western novel

María Dolores Acevedo (pen name May Miller; 1932-1998) was a Spanish Galician writer.

== Biography ==
María Dolores Acevedo y Vázquez was born in Monforte de Lemos, Lugo, Spain, in 1932.

She wrote more than 150 novels, especially for Editorial Bruguera, published between 1956 and 1974. Her main genre was romantic novels, as María Dolores Acevedo, although she also wrote some western novels under the pseudonym May Miller. Many of her novels were translated into Portuguese.

María Dolores Acevedo died in 1998 in León, where she had been a resident for many years.

== Works ==
=== As María Dolores Acevedo ===
- Cuatro destinos (1956)
- El lazo roto (1956)
- El cuadro de la madona (1957)
- La gran Sonia (1958)
- Al borde del pecado (1959)
- Cárcel de oro (1960)
- El secreto del pantano (1960)
- Serpientes en el "Paraíso" (1960)
- Amor en Calcuta (1961)
- Aquella noche en Roma (1961)
- El secreto de su piel (1961)
- En una calle cualquiera (1961)
- Llega un millonario (1961)
- Carta de despedida (1962)
- Celos mortales (1962)
- El ayer nos pertenece (1962)
- La escuela de la vida (1962)
- La sombra de una mujer (1962)
- Pasiones desatadas (1962)
- Tras los grises muros (1962)
- Como un dulce veneno (1963)
- Con amor y rabia (1963)
- Creo tu verdad (1963)
- Duda mortal (1963)
- El embrujo de unos ojos (1963)
- El tormento de la duda (1963)
- Juego peligroso (1963)
- La prisionera (1963)
- La vil intriga (1963)
- Lejana pasión (1963)
- Noches de Rabat (1963)
- Rosas de sangre (1963)
- Suprema ansiedad (1963)
- Del odio al amor (1964)
- En cuerpo y alma (1964)
- Escrúpulos para amar (1964)
- Flor del campo (1964)
- Historia de una enfermera (1964)
- Huyendo del destino (1964)
- Los años vacíos (1964)
- Sueños de juventud (1964)
- Una chica frívola (1964)
- ¡Esta mujer corre peligro! (1965)
- Amando en silencio (1965)
- Aquel viejo amor (1965)
- Celos de sí mismo (1965)
- Doctora y mujer (1965)
- El amor no muere (1965)
- El amor tormentoso (1965)
- El resurgir de la ilusión (1965)
- El secreto de la doctora Cremier (1965)
- Esa fuerza llamada amor (1965)
- La fuerza del pasado (1965)
- La vida en broma (1965)
- Mi querido doctor (1965)
- No llegará el amor (1965)
- No soy una cualquiera (1965)
- Póker de pasiones (1965)
- Por amar demasiado (1965)
- Sedienta de cariño (1965)
- Un recuerdo imborrable (1965)
- Un remanso de paz (1965)
- Yo te perdono (1965)
- Zarpazos de gata (1965)
- Amor en la niebla (1966)
- Ansias de amor (1966)
- El amor de una enfermera (1966)
- El tesoro de tu amor (1966)
- Es peligroso soñar (1966)
- La esposa frívola (1966)
- La huella de una caricia (1966)
- Pasión en "Isla Azul" (1966)
- Profesor de amor (1966)
- Rebelde para el amor (1966)
- Soy inocente (1966)
- Te defenderé de todos (1966)
- Te quiero, doctora (1966)
- Traición de amor (1966)
- Un loco amor (1966)
- Un marido "ye-ye" (1966)
- Vestida de novia (1966)
- Volver a la vida (1966)
- Amores de estudiantes (1967)
- Aquella mirada azul (1967)
- Con una sonrisa (1967)
- Dulce amor (1967)
- Era un médico rural (1967)
- Guerra entre dos (1967)
- La gentil doctora (1967)
- Las cálidas noches (1967)
- Llegó el amor (1967)
- Los jóvenes años (1967)
- Querida salvajilla (1967)
- Sorpresas de amor (1967)
- Un hombre sin rencor (1967)
- Una chica con ángel (1967)
- Amor impuesto (1968)
- Camino de luz (1968)
- El amor de mi marido (1968)
- Jugando con fuego (1968)
- La mujer que robó un amor (1968)
- Magia de amor (1968)
- Nostalgia de ti (1968)
- Nuestro bello amor (1968)
- Supo que le amaba (1968)
- Te enseñaré a vivir (1968)
- Te quise siempre (1968)
- Tu rebeldía y mi amor (1968)
- Un auténtico hombre (1968)
- Un nuevo amor (1968)
- Una mentira piadosa (1968)
- Comencé odiándote (1969)
- Empezar de nuevo (1969)
- Eres mi obsesión (1969)
- Lucharon por su amor (1969)
- Matrimonio en peligro (1969)
- No fue un capricho (1969)
- No supe defenderte (1969)
- Perdona mi cobardía (1969)
- Reencuentro en "Los Magnolios" (1969)
- Sin ti no soy nada (1969)
- Te lo debo a ti (1969)
- Trío de amor (1969)
- Tu dulce recuerdo (1969)
- Tu indiferencia (1969)
- Tu patria será la mía (1969)
- Un destino adverso (1969)
- Una culpa de amor (1969)
- "Boicot" a una mujer (1970)
- Amor y sacrificio (1970)
- Fue por despecho (1970)
- Fui una más en tu vida (1970)
- Me enseñaste a ser mujer (1970)
- Mi culpa nos separa (1970)
- Por fin te quiero (1970)
- Te amamos las dos (1970)
- Te ofendí por celos (1970)
- Te pido perdón (1970)
- Tú eres diferente (1970)
- Tu ternura de mujer (1970)
- No quiero envilecerte (1971)
- No soy una chica fácil (1971)
- Tu falso candor (1971)
- La ley de la codicia (1973)
- Con la duda en el corazón (1974)
- No quiero tu lástima (1974)
- Quisiste destruirme (1974)
- Soy tu juguete (1974)

=== As May Miller ===
- Cuatrero y asesino (1970)
- Nido de forajidos (1971)
- El hijo del sheriff (1972)
- El tronar de los revólveres (1972)
- Tierra de cuatreros (1972)
