= Terra de Lemos =

Coordinates: 42.55°N 7.55°W

- Comarca
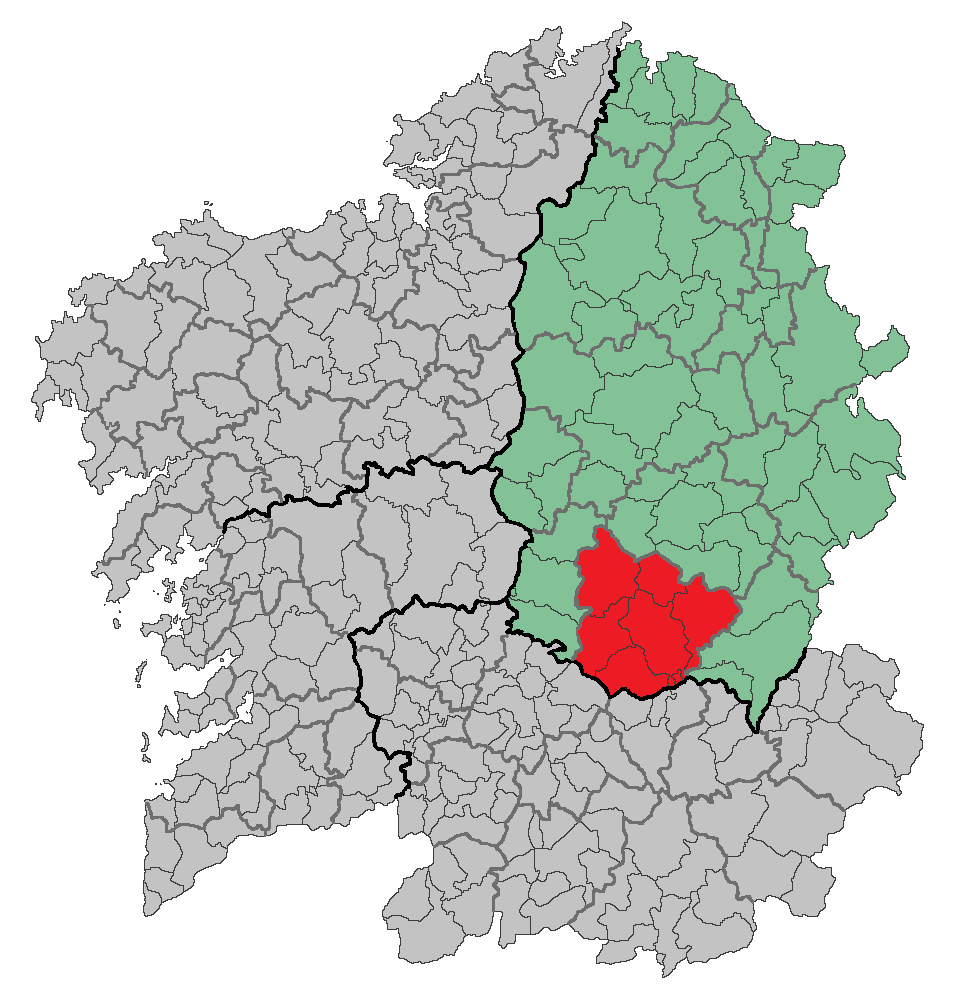
- Country: Spain
- Autonomous community: Galicia
- Province: Lugo
- Capital: Monforte de Lemos
- Municipalities: List: Bóveda, Monforte de Lemos, Pantón, A Pobra do Brollón, O Saviñao, Sober

Population (2019)
  - Total: 30,151
- Time zone: UTC+1 (CET)
  - Summer (DST): UTC+2 (CEST)

A Terra de Lemos is a comarca in the Galician province of Lugo. The overall population of this local region is 30,151 (2019).

== Municipalities ==
Bóveda, Monforte de Lemos, Pantón, A Pobra do Brollón, O Saviñao and Sober.
