= College of Nosa Señora da Antiga =

College located in Monforte de Lemos, Spain

Coordinates: 42°31′6″N 7°31′1″W

- Colexio da Nosa Señora da Antiga
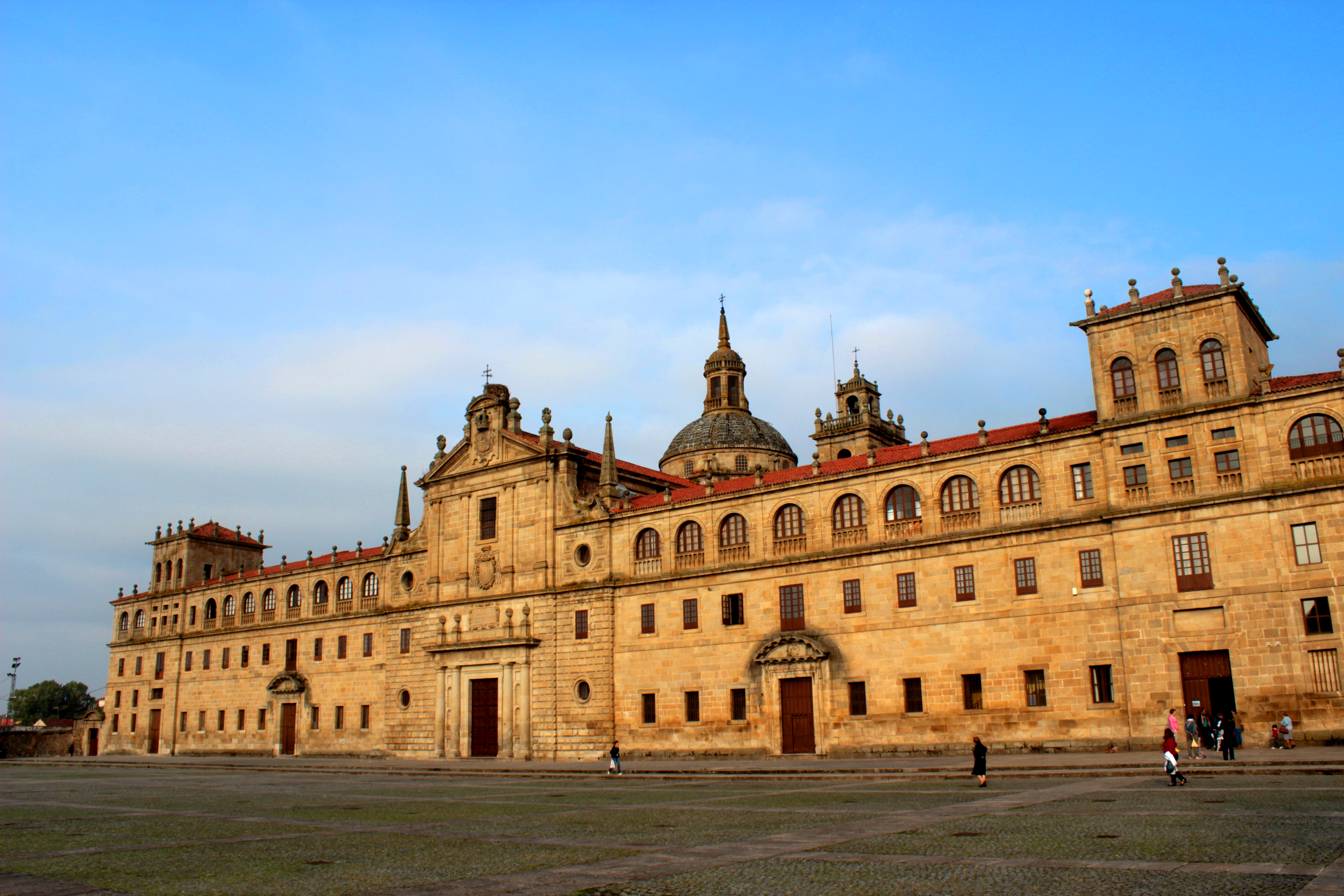
- Facade of the building.

Location
- Location: Monforte de Lemos, Galicia, Spain
- Interactive map of College of Nosa Señora da Antiga

Architecture
- Style: Herrerian

Website
- Official website

The College of Nosa Señora da Antiga is located in Monforte de Lemos, in the province of Lugo, Spain, within the Ribeira Sacra region. Constructed in the Herreriano style, the college is often referred to as the "El Escorial of Galicia" because of its architectural style.

== History ==
The college was founded by Cardinal Rodrigo de Castro Osorio in 1593, originally as a seminary. Today, it operates as a private school.

Osorio, a prominent Renaissance figure, served as Archbishop of Seville and was both a benefactor of Monforte and a patron of the arts.

Initially managed by the Jesuits, the college’s administration changed following the order’s expulsion from Spain under the Pragmatic Sanction of 1767, which mandated the removal of all Jesuit-associated symbols from the country. Since 1873, the school has been administered by the Piarists.

== Architecture ==
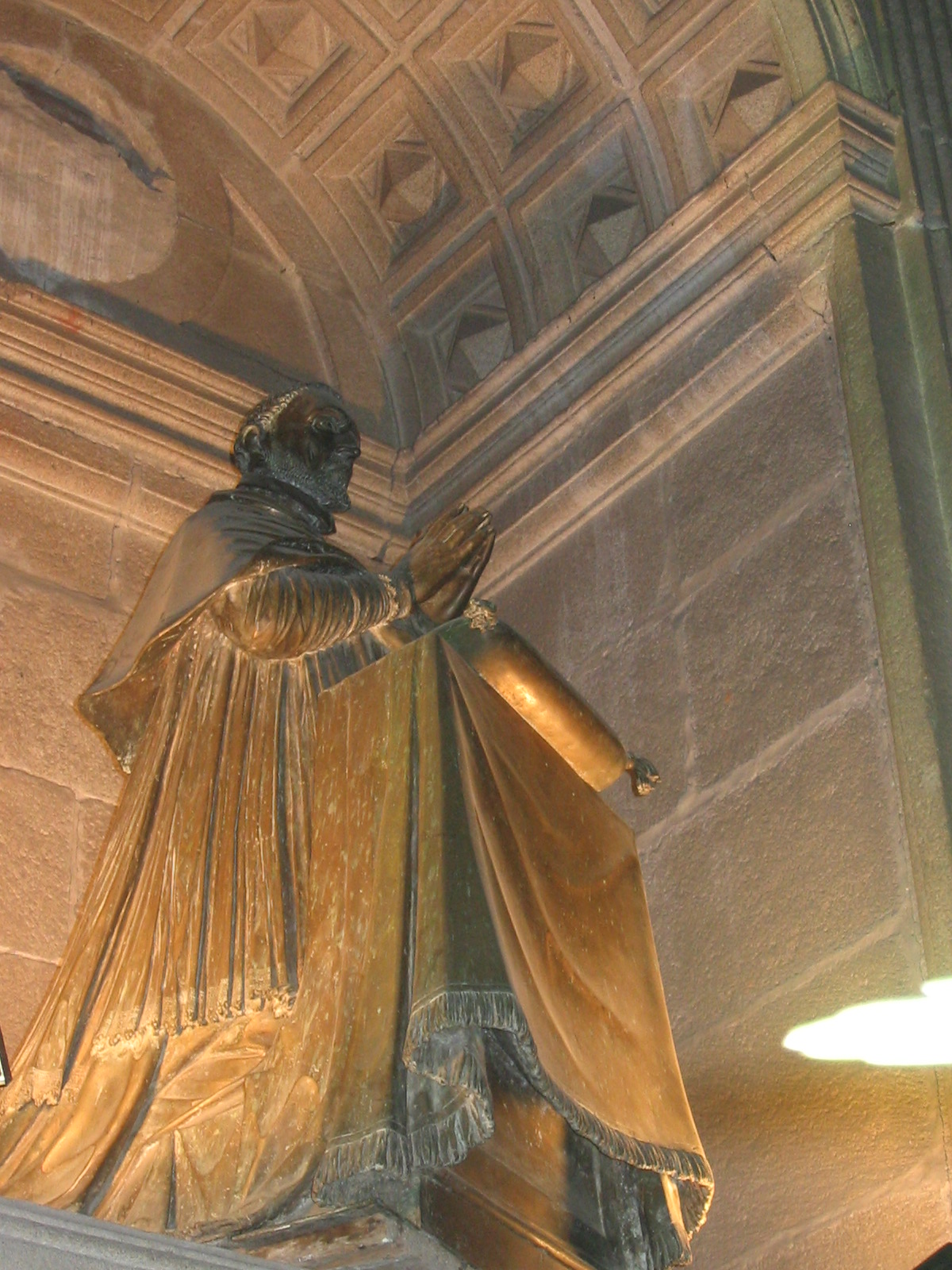
Rodrigo de Castro Osorio, praying statue, by Giambologna

The church features a walnut altar carved in the 17th century by Francisco de Moure and his son. On one side of the altar stands a statue of Cardinal Rodrigo de Castro in a praying posture, created by Giambologna. This statue, positioned above the cardinal’s remains, faces a painting of Our Lady of Antigua.

The school contains two cloisters, although the west wing remains unfinished. The monumental staircase, constructed between 1594 and 1603, is located in the east wing. Its design incorporates three arches supported solely by the load-bearing walls, which hold thirteen, nine, and thirteen steps, respectively. Each step is carved from a single piece of granite. On the ground, a projection of the staircase is drawn, serving as a guide for its construction.

== Museum ==
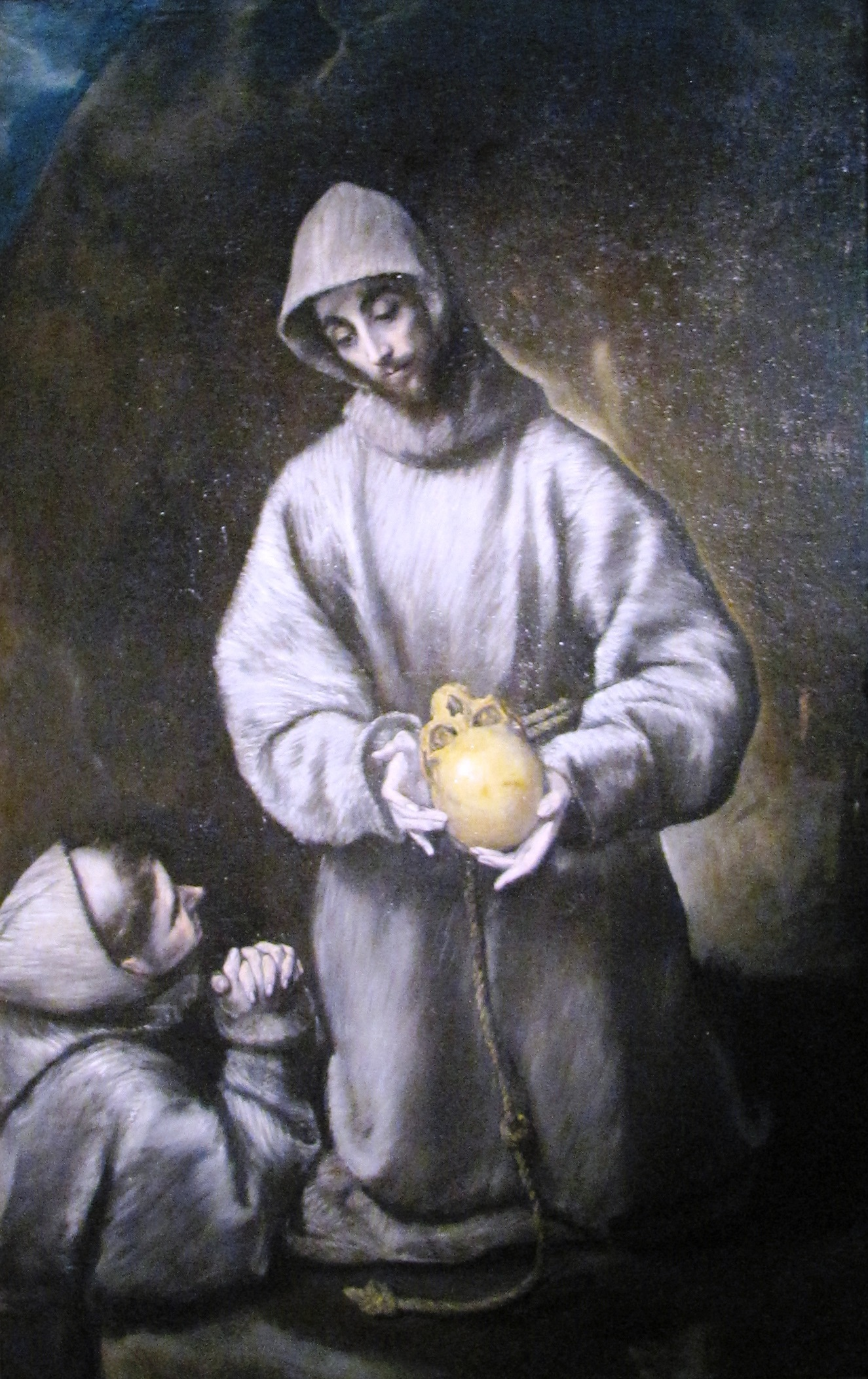
Francis of Assisi, the work of El Greco.

An art gallery is housed in the old sacristy, displaying a small collection donated by the cardinal, including two oil paintings by El Greco. One of these, Saint Francis and Saint Leo I Meditating on Death (pictured above), depicts Saints Francis of Assisi and Leo I contemplating a skull in a memento mori motif.

Additional works in the gallery include five paintings by the Mannerist artist Andrea del Sarto: St. Margaret of Cortona, St. Agnes, St. Catherine of Alexandria, St. Peter, and St. John the Baptist. The painting The Adoration of the Magi by Van der Goes is a copy; the original was sold in 1913 to the Staatliche Museen in Berlin for 1,200,000 pesetas, funding the completion of the school’s construction. The gallery also features two works from the School of Compostela, Death and Doomsday, as well as an anonymous portrait of Cardinal Rodrigo de Castro.

The museum holds several incunabula and manuscripts, including an incomplete copy of Libro de la Caza de las Aves (Book of Bird Hunting), a treatise on falconry by Pedro López de Ayala written during his captivity in Portugal, along with personal belongings of the cardinal.

== See also ==
- 17th-century Western domes
- List of Jesuit sites
