= Rajo (surname) =

Rajo is a surname. Notable people with the surname include:

- Eva Rajo (born 1972), Spanish microwave engineer
- Jordan Domínguez Rajó (born 1995), Spanish footballer
- Nabil Rajo, Eritrean-Canadian actor

== See also ==
- Gábor Rajos (born 1984), Hungarian footballer
