= Froilano =

Froilano is a masculine given name. Notable people with the name include:

- Froilano Machado (1925–2008), Indian politician, lawyer and freedom fighter
- Froilano de Mello (1887–1955), Portuguese-Brazilian microbiologist, professor and politician

== See also ==
- Froilan
