= Fróilaz =

Fróilaz is a surname. Notable people with the surname include:

- Alfonso Fróilaz (fl. 925), king of the united kingdom of Asturias, Galicia, and León
- Gonçalo Froilaz, Count of Coimbra
- Pedro Fróilaz de Traba (fl. 1086–1126), Kingdom of Galicia nobleman
- Ramiro Fróilaz (fl. 1120–1169), Kingdom of León magnate, statesman, and military leader
