= Bóveda =

- Municipality
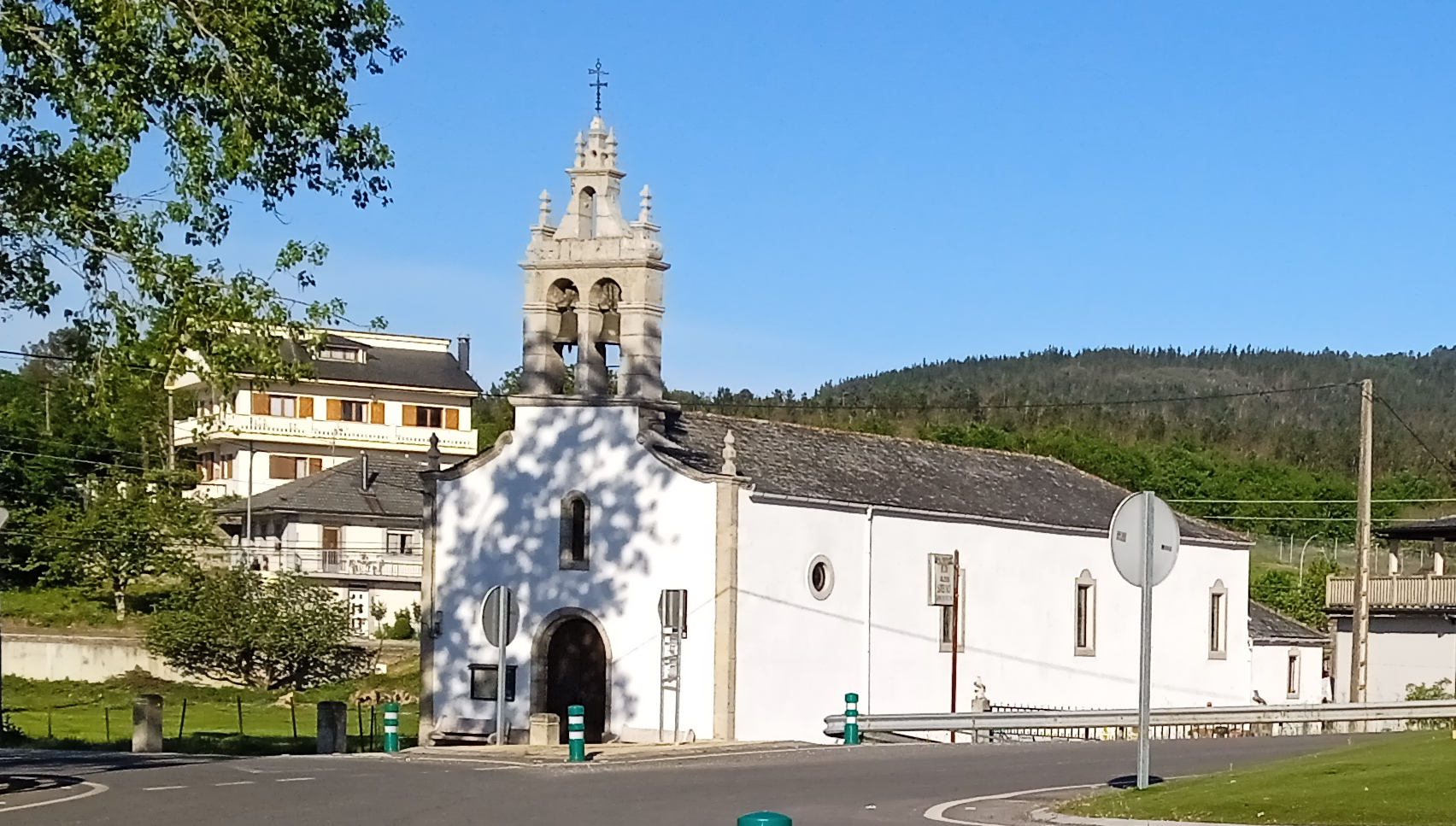

- Flag Coat of arms

- Location within Province of Lugo Location within Galicia Location within Spain
- Coordinates: 42°37′40″N 7°28′50″W
- Country: Spain
- Autonomous community: Galicia
- Province: Lugo
- Comarca: Terra de Lemos

Government
  - Mayor: José Manuel Arias López

Area
  - Total: 91.11 km^{2} (35.18 sq mi)

Population (2025-01-01)
  - Total: 1,369
  - Density: 15.03/km^{2} (38.92/sq mi)
- Demonym: Bovedenses
- Time zone: UTC+1 (CET)
  - Summer (DST): UTC+2 (CEST)
- Website: Official website

Bóveda (Galician pronunciation: [ˈbɔβeða]) is a municipality in the province of Lugo, in the autonomous community of Galicia, northwestern Spain. It belongs to the comarca of Terra de Lemos. The population in 2008 was 1,719 people according to the municipal register of inhabitants.

== Monuments ==
- Igrexa de San Martiño
- Capela de San Xil
- Pazo dos Condes de Liria-Bóveda
- Praza da Filgueira
- Concello
- Capela do Ecce-Homo
- Igrexa dos Santos Pedro e Santiago

== Civil parishes ==
- Bóveda (San Martiño)
- Freituxe (Santiago)
- Guntín (San Cristovo)
- Martín (San Cristovo)
- Mosteiro (San Paio)
- Remesar (San Xoán)
- Ribas Pequenas (Santiago)
- Rubián (Santiago)
- Sanfiz de Rubián (Sanfiz)
- Teilán (Santa Baia)
- Tuimil (Santa María)
- Ver (San Vicenzo)
- Vilalpape (San Bartolomeu)
- Vilarbuxán (San Bartolomeu)
