= Larin (name) =

Larin or Larín is a given name and a surname. As a surname, in Slavic countries it is used only for men, alongside its feminine counterpart Larina.

People with this name include:

== Given name ==
- Larin Paraske (1833–1904), Izhorian oral poet

== Pen name ==
- Larin-Kyösti, pseudonym of the Finnish poet Karl Gustaf Larson (1873–1948)

== Surname ==
- Alexander Larín (born 1992), Salvadoran association-football player
- Anna Larina (1914–1996), second wife of the Bolshevik leader Nikolai Bukharin
- Cyle Larin (born 1995), Canadian association-football player
- Dmitry Larin (born 1973), Russian association-football manager
- Ivan Larin (1926–1986), Russian football-player and coach
- Kim McLarin, African-American novelist
- Liz Larin, Detroit-based singer-songwriter
- Oleksiy Larin (born 1994), Ukrainian football-player
- Rafael Menjívar Larín (1935–2000), Salvadoran economist and politician
- Sergei Larin (born 1986), Kazakhstani football-manager and former player
- Sergej Larin (1956–2008), Soviet operatic tenor
- Sergejus Larinas, Latvian-Russian opera singer
- Tatiana Larina, a major character in Alexander Pushkin's 1825-1833 poem Yevgeniy Onegin
- Valeria Larina (1926–2008), Russian realist painter
- Vasily Larin (1908–1957), Soviet general
- Vassa Larin (born 1970), American author
- Vladimir Larin (1948–1995), Russian football player
- Vladimir N. Larin, Russian geologist whose "Primordially Hydridic Earth" theory suggested that natural hydrogen played a vital role in the evolution of Earth
- Yuri Larin (1882–1932), Soviet economist and politician
