= Joe Jagersberger =

American engineer (1884–1952)

- Born: Josef Wilhelm Jagersberger; February 14, 1884 Wiener Neustadt, Austria
- Died: October 5, 1952 (aged 68) Racine, Wisconsin, U.S.

Champ Car career
- 2 races run over 1 year
- First race: 1911 Indianapolis 500 (Indianapolis)
- Last race: 1911 Philadelphia Race #4 (Fairmount Park)
Wins	Podiums	Poles
0	0	0

Joseph William Jagersberger (born Josef Wilhelm Jagersberger; February 14, 1884 – October 5, 1952) was an American racing driver and mechanical engineer.

== Background ==
Jagersberger was born in Wiener Neustadt, southwest of Vienna, in Cisleithania, the Austrian component of the Austro-Hungarian Empire. As a teenager, Jagersberger moved to Paris, where he worked at a Mercedes dealership.

While in Paris, Jagersberger met American racer Harry Harkness, and decided to emigrate United States in 1902, eventually settling in Racine, Wisconsin. He married Amanda Olle in 1919. He started working at Case Corporation in Racine to develop a car racing program.

He became a US citizen in April 1934

== Auto designer and racer ==
=== 1911 Indianapolis 500 ===
Jagersberger started eighth in the first Indianapolis 500 in 1911 in a Case chassis. The steering knuckle on his car broke and he had to bow out of the race after 87 laps, and finished 31st. The spinning car veered back and forth across the track, down the pit lane, and back onto the track. It hit the judges stand, and the judges fled their posts. Jagerberger's riding mechanic flew out of the car and onto the track. The next driver on the scene had to avoid the riding mechanic. Several drivers were taken out in the melee, including Harry Knight, Herbert Lytle, and Eddie Hearne. Knight's riding mechanic was the only person who suffered an injury, but his back fully recovered. The leaders of the race safely navigated through the wrecked cars.

== Career-ending accident ==
Jagersberger continued to race and in November 1911, in Columbia, South Carolina, he struck a fence due to a burst tire. He was in the hospital for several months, having his right leg was amputated, which ended his racing career.

== Motor company ==
Jagersberger continued to design cylinder heads and peripheral equipment and he started his own company, Rajo Motor and Manufacturing, several years later.

== Career awards ==
- In June 2006, Jagersberger was inducted into the Model T Ford Club Speedster and Racer Hall of Fame, in San Jose, California.
- In April 2007, Jagersberger was inducted into the Chevy Sprints Association.
- Jagersberger was inducted in the National Sprint Car Hall of Fame in June 2007 as an engine builder and manufacturer.

== Motorsports career results ==
=== Indianapolis 500 results ===
Year	Car	Start	Qual	Rank	Finish	Laps	Led	Retired
1911	8	8	—	—	31	87	0	Crash FS
Totals						87	0	

Starts	1
Poles	0
Front Row	0
Wins	0
Top 5	0
Top 10	0
Retired	1
