= Rajo Motor and Manufacturing =

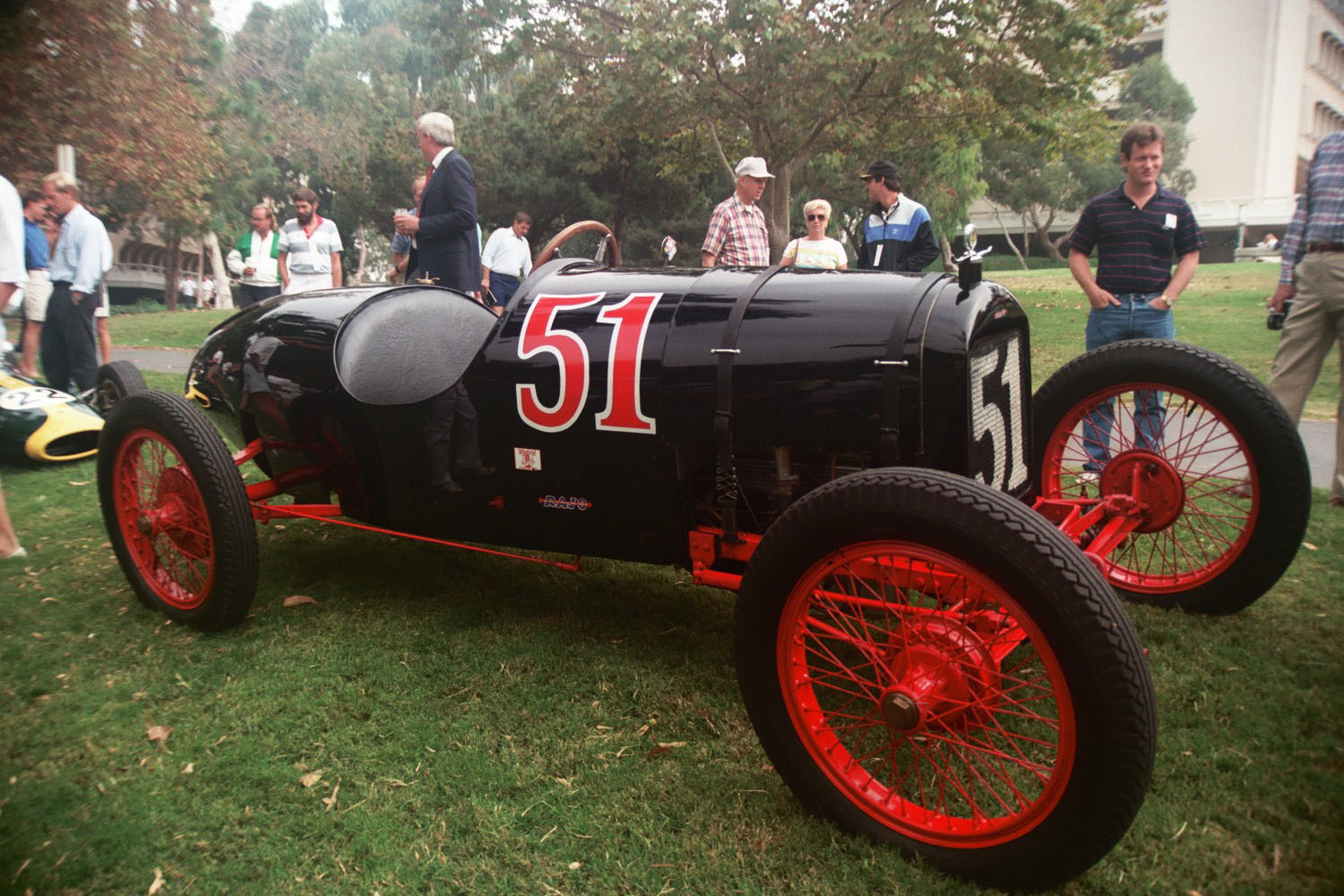
A Rajo Ford Model T

Rajo Motor and Manufacturing was a manufacturing company based in Racine, Wisconsin in the twentieth century. The company built performance enhancing cylinder heads for Model T cars that were designed by Joe Jagersberger (Rajo Joe). The company was named by combining the "RA" from Racine and the "JO" from Joe Jagersberger's first name. The heads were sold around the world. The company's Los Angeles salesman Rajo Jack helped popularize the heads.

== History ==
In 1911 Joe Jagersberger retired from driving after he had one of his legs amputated. Jagersberger continued to work for J.I. Case, as he had before the crash, until he decided to go out on his own. The company was formed in 1914 as Rajo Manufacturing. Jagersberger restructured the company in October 1919 after he designed a head with double the performance of the stock Model T head.

== Models ==
Rajo Motor started out building spark plugs and other various engine parts. The first design was the Model 30 which had 4 exhaust ports and one intake port all on the right side of the head. The Model 31 had two intakes on the right and four exhaust on the left. The Model 35C, first known as the "Improved Rajo Valve-in-Head" and later as the Model C had two intakes and three exhausts on the right. The Model A used the stock intake ports on the block. It had two exhaust ports on the right. His Model B featured two intakes on the right and four exhausts on the left. It came in three versions. The BB featured a higher compression ratio and the BB-R also included two spark plugs per cylinder.

Chevrolet work

He also offered a modification to the 1941-52 Chevrolet "Stovebolt" L6 OHV 15 bolt head, which added another set of 3 intake ports above the 3 originals, to permit adding (an) extra carburetor(s) on a separate manifold.

Jagersberger died in 1952. The company closed in 1980.
