= Eva Rajo =

Spanish microwave engineer

Eva Rajo Iglesias (born 1972) is a Spanish electrical engineer whose research involves the use of metamaterials, metasurfaces, and periodic surface structures, as waveguides and antennas for microwave and millimeter-wave radio signals. She is a professor in the Department of Signal Theory and Communications of Charles III University of Madrid.

== Education and career ==
Rajo is originally from Monforte de Lemos, where she was born in 1972. She became a student of telecommunication engineering at the University of Vigo, where she received a master's degree in 1996. Continuing her education at Charles III University of Madrid, she completed her Ph.D. in 2002.

She worked as a teaching assistant at the Polytechnic University of Cartagena in 2001, and a visiting lecturer at Charles III University beginning in 2002. In 2004 she obtained a regular-rank associate professorship there, and in 2018 she was promoted to full professor. She also held an affiliation with Chalmers University in Sweden as a guest researcher and affiliated professor from 2004 to 2016.

== Recognition ==
Rajo was named to the 2026 class of IEEE Fellows, "for contributions to artificial surfaces and their impact on gap waveguide technology for millimeter waves".
