= Froila Muñoz =

Leonese count

Froila (or Fruela) Muñoz was a Leonese count. The sixty-seven surviving charters recording his property exchanges between 1007 and 1045 provide "compelling evidence of the active part that was being played by members of the aristocracy in the land markets of eleventh-century León" and that no "ecclesiastical monopoly on land investment and speculation existed." It is also partial evidence of a "spectacular increase in the mobility of land" in Christian Spain in the eleventh century "as both aristocratic families and ecclesiastical institutions sought to expand their domains at the expense of individual peasant proprietors". In the eleventh and twelfth centuries in Spain, serious crimes such as murder, rape, arson, robbery, and cattle rustling were generally punished by the local lord with the imposition of a calumnia, or compensatory fine. These were more often paid in land than in monies, and this contributed heavily to Froila's increase in landed wealth, as several of his charters demonstrate. A record of all these transactions is kept in the archives of the convent of Santa María de Otero de las Dueñas, to which its foundress, María Núñez, granted all her Leonese properties inherited from her ancestors, with their titles deeds, in 1240.

Froila's daughter María Fróilaz married Diego Pérez, son of Count Pedro Flaínez and Bronilde. María and Diego were the parents of Froila Díaz.
