= Froy Salinas =

American politician (1939–2021)

Froylan D. Salinas

Member of the Texas House of Representatives from the 83rd district
- In office January 11, 1983 – January 8, 1985
- Preceded by: Ashley Smith
- Succeeded by: Ron D. Givens

Member of the Texas House of Representatives from district 75-B
- In office January 11, 1977 – January 11, 1983
- Preceded by: District created
- Succeeded by: District abolished

Personal details
- Born: Froylan D. Salinas; October 5, 1939
- Died: May 10, 2021 (aged 81) Austin, Texas, United States
- Party: Democratic

Froylan D. Salinas (October 5, 1939 – May 10, 2021) was an American politician who served in the Texas House of Representatives from 1977 to 1985. A member of the Democratic Party, he was the first Latino lawmaker from Lubbock.

== Biography ==
Salinas lived in Lubbock, Texas. He was elected to the Texas House of Representatives in 1976, and served until 1985. He stated in a 2010 interview that racial discrimination was common until just a few years before his election, stating "I still remember the signs on restaurant doors and windows saying no Mexicans or dogs allowed".

Following his legislative tenure, he went on to serve as a lobbyist and as chancellor of Texas Tech University. He died on May 10, 2021, in Austin, Texas, at age 81.
