= Monforte de Lemos =

- Municipality
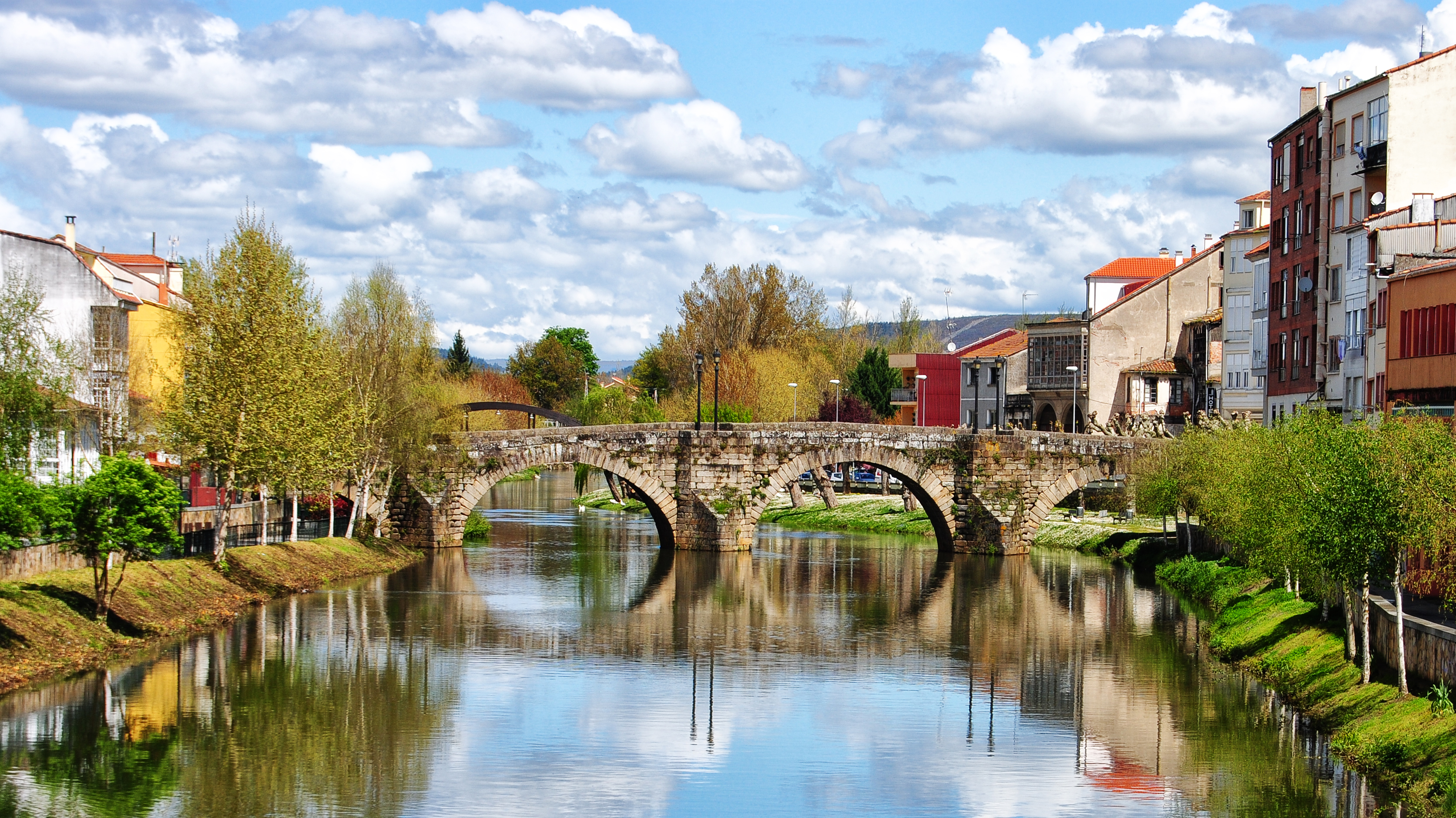
- View of Monforte from the Cabe River

- Coat of arms

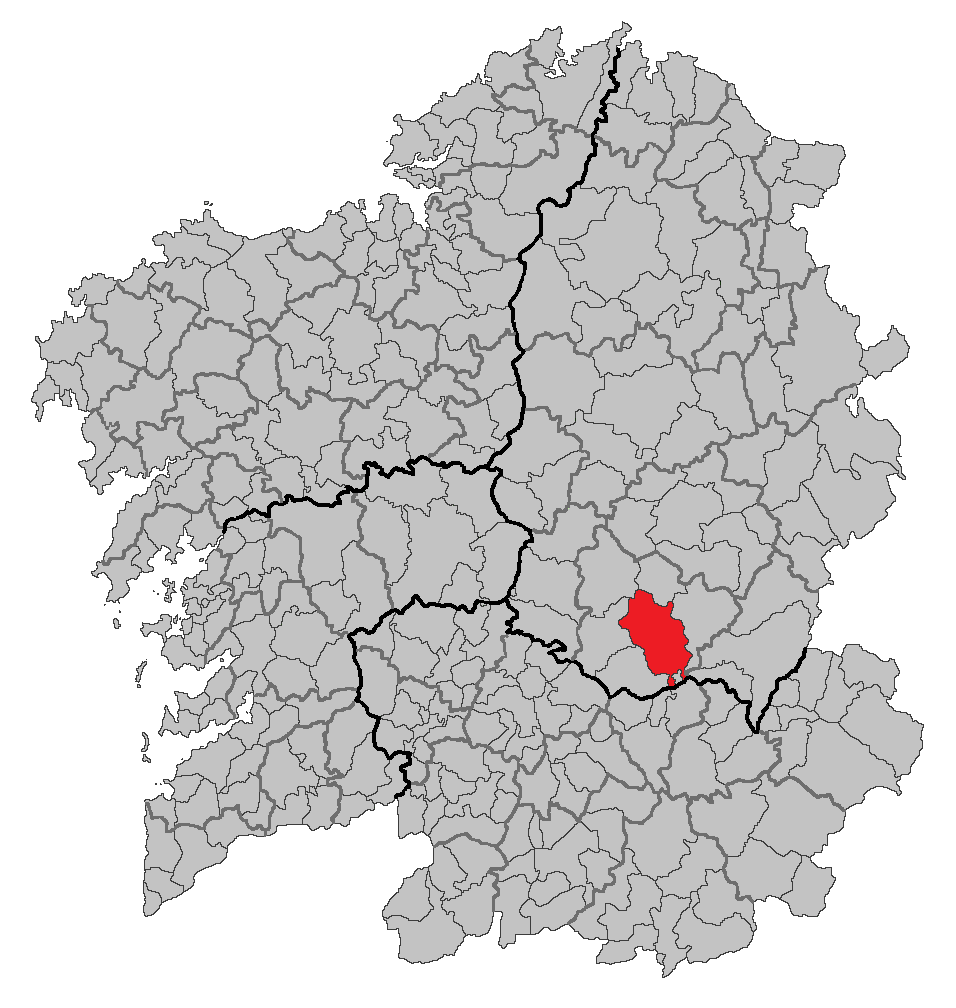
- Location of Monforte de Lemos

- Location of Monforte de Lemos Monforte de Lemos (Spain)
- Coordinates: 42°30′59″N 7°30′58″W
- Country: Spain
- Autonomous community: Galicia
- Province: Lugo
- Comarca: Terra de Lemos

Area
  - Total: 199.5 km^{2} (77.0 sq mi)
- Elevation: 360 m (1,180 ft)

Population (2025-01-01)
  - Total: 18,933
  - Density: 94.90/km^{2} (245.8/sq mi)
- Demonym(s): Monfortino, na
- Time zone: UTC+1 (CET)
  - Summer (DST): UTC+2 (CEST)
- Postal code: 27400
- Website: Official website

Monforte de Lemos is a town and municipality in northwestern Spain, in the province of Lugo, Galicia. It covers an area of 200 km^{2} and lies 62 km from Lugo. As of 2017 it had a population of 18,783.

== Location ==
Map.

Monforte de Lemos is located in a valley between the rivers Miño and Sil. The river Cabe, a tributary of Sil, runs through the city. It is the core of the region known as Terra de Lemos and capital of the area known as Ribeira Sacra or Terras de Lemos.

== Symbols ==
The coat of arms of Monforte de Lemos was approved after the mandatory report of the Heraldic Council of Galicia, the autonomous government, under Decree 166/2002 of April 25, 2002. The process sparked some initial controversy by contemplating the withdrawal of the Tau of Gules, a heraldic device associated, among others, to the Order of St. Anthony and St. Anton. It was traditionally used as an emblem of the town, finally being emblazoned, in response to this feature together with its historical strength and its relationship with the House of Lemos, as follows:

Of Silver, a mountain of gold, added to the tower of the same, accompanied in the center of the head of a Tau of Gules and six azure bezants, on the flanks. At the ring, royal crown closed

== History ==
=== Paleolithic to the Romans ===
The area around the town has been inhabited since long before the Roman occupation, as testified by excavations of sites dating to the Bronze Age. The history of Monforte de Lemos goes back to the Paleolithic, and its first known inhabitants were the Oestrimnios. This period was called the "castrexa" or the culture of the forts, typical of the Celtic tribes. The tribe that populated Monforte was known as the Lemavi tribe, and the first written references to them date from the Roman historians Pliny the Elder and Strabo, between 600 and 900 BC. The Lemavi were centered on the hill of San Vicente. The word "Lemos," which also gives name to the region, known as Terra de Lemos, would be a voice of Celtic origin meaning "moist, fertile soil" and seems to connect with the root Galician word of "lama" or in English "mud." It is believed that during pre-history, Monforte, now a valley, was a large lagoon, and evidence of this is found in the hard red clay by digging a few feet into the floor of the city. Likewise, its river, el Cabe, was already known for its ferrous properties and much appreciated at the time of tempering swords of Celtic warriors, who came from all corners to take comfort with its excellent properties. The settlement of the Lemavis was the Castro Dactonium, whose actual location has long been disputed, although early medieval sources point to its likely location on San Vicente do Pino, the main town which was the origin of today's Monforte. "Dactonium, quod dicitur pinus" (Dactonio, which they call Pine), one of the documents states which supports this version. The theory has been recently reinforced by the discovery of remains of Castraña houses on the slopes of the mountains.

From the Romans, whose track has been demonstrated in the city, comes the word "Monforte", from the Latin "Mons-Fortis". Subsequently, the Suevi and the Visigoths left their own footprints. In the Swabian era, the lands of Lemos belonged largely to the Condado Pallarense (related to the place of Pallares in the civil parish of Baamorto).

=== Middle Ages to the Enlightenment ===
It is believed the town was destroyed in the 8th century by the Muslim invaders.

In the 12th century, the Count of Galicia granted the city to Fruela Díaz, of the House of Lemos, who had the town rebuilt over the ruins. Monforte thenceforth flourished as an agricultural market.

During the Middle Ages, a Benedictine community established on the Monastery of San Vicente del Pino. Numerous monasteries were built around the city in that period, in the zone known as Ribeira Sacra ("Sacred Shore"), including the area between the shores of the Sil and Miño rivers, where they also run through canyons.

Both the capital tower and the fortified city's walls were demolished during the Irmandiño revolt in the second half of 15th century. The rebels repressed by the Count of Lemos, the lord of the land, who made them work to rebuild the castle.

In 1883 the town was reached by a railroad, which helped Monforte to take place as a trade and communication center, due to its position as Galicia's entrance by train.

During the Spanish Civil War, the republican mayor, Juan Tizón, escaped to Portugal, after trying to reorganize the resistance. His predecessor, major Rosendo Vila Fernandez, was killed by the rebels.

In the next decades the rail station was partially dismantled, the communication center was moved to the city of Ourense, the train factories were removed, causing a period of economic depression. Tourism business is one of the currently expanding activities in Monforte.

== Main sights ==
Nosa Señora da Antiga's School, a monumental school and church in Herrerian style, is known as the "Galician Escorial". The square in front of it was known as Campo da Compañía ("The Society Square") when the building was occupied by the Society of Jesus, which managed the school until their expulsion order from Spain, after which the Piarists took it over.

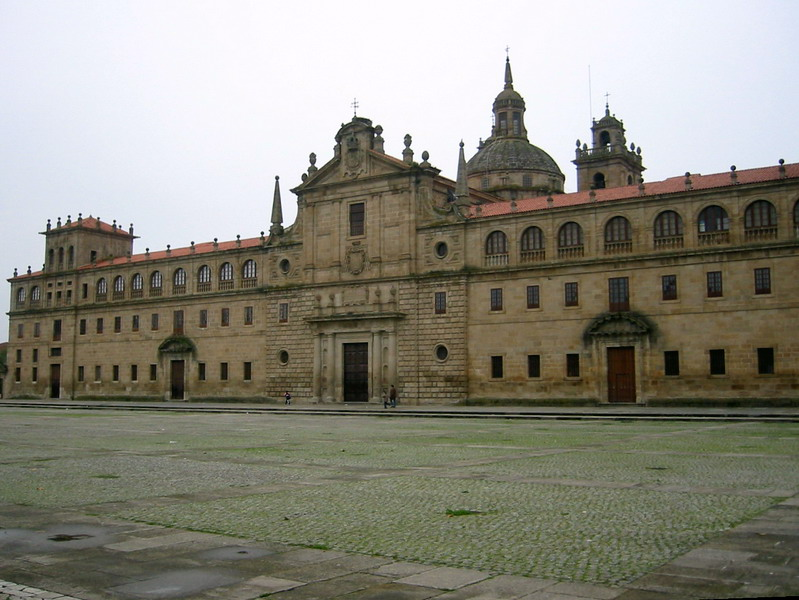
Nosa Señora da Antiga's School

Inside the school's church is an altarpiece built by Francisco de Moure and finished by his son. Over the altarpiece is an empty piece of wood from which the Society of Jesus' symbol was erased, in order to clean every fingerprint they left on Spain. The school also houses a collection of pictures by artists such as El Greco and Andrea del Sarto. The monumental stair, featuring an apparent lack of physical support, is made from one marble piece, and supported on air by a game of strengths. The praying statue of Cardinal Rodrigo The Castro is placed over his grave, inside the church, and in front of an image of Nosa Señora da Antiga; recent works have found that the grave of Cardinal Rodrigo's mother is hidden behind the picture.

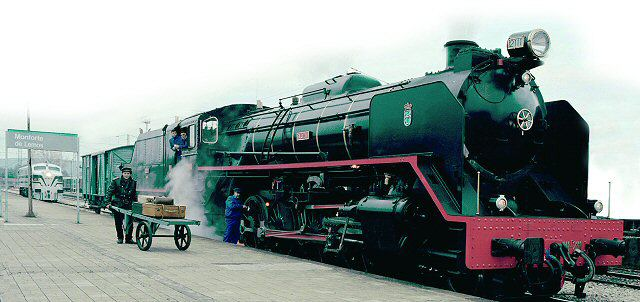
Old Mikado Machine, on Monforte's railroad station

A railroad museum has been created in the old train factory for the purpose of maintaining and displaying old locomotives and rail cars (including an operating steam-driven locomotive).

Other important sights are:

- Medieval castle
- San Vicente do Pino's Church (14th-16th centuries)
- Santa Maria's Church (17th century)
- Santa Clara's Church (16th century)
- Medieval city walls
- Old bridge (16th century)
- County palace
- San Antonio's Square
- Virgen's Square, in the medieval town, dedicated to the saint patron of the city, Our Lady of Montserrat
- Spain's Square, downtown

== Demography ==
From:INE Archiv

== Notable people ==
- Maria Dolores Acevedo
- Pedro Fernandez De Castro, Seventh count of Lemos
- Cardinal Rodrigo de Castro
- Pedro Antonio Fernández de Castro, 10th Count of Lemos
- Eva Rajo, electrical engineering professor

== See also ==
- Monforte Altarpiece

== Notes ==
- Vázquez, Germán. Historia de Monforte.
- de Guevara, Pardo. Los señores de Galicia.
- Hermida Balado, Manuel. Lemos.
