= Alicante Ganzin =

Variety of grape

- Grape (Vitis)
- Color of berry skin: Noir
- Species: American Vitis hybrid
- Origin: United States 1958
- Original pedigree: Alicante Bouschet × Ganzin 4
- Pedigree parent 1: Alicante Bouschet
- Pedigree parent 2: Ganzin 4 (Aramon × Vitis rupestris)
- Notable regions: California wine
- VIVC number: 303

Alicante Ganzin is a red French wine grape variety. Unlike most Vitis vinifera wine grapes, Alicante Ganzin is a teinturier with dark flesh that produces red juice. Most varieties used to produce red wine, such as Cabernet Sauvignon, Syrah, etc., have clear color flesh and juice with the wine receiving its color through a maceration process where the color seeps out of the grape skins for as long as they are in contact with the juice. Alicante Ganzin can thus produce light red and rose colored wine without maceration. It is believed that Alicante Ganzin is often described as the progenitor of all French teinturier grapes.

== History ==
While Alicante Ganzin is believed by ampelographers to be the progenitor of all French teinturiers, the exact origins of the grape variety are not clear. Some, such as British wine expert Jancis Robinson, describe the grape as a cross of Alicante Bouschet and a hybrid of a Vitis rupestris variety and Vitis vinifera grape Aramon known as Aramon Rupestris Ganzin No.4. This is the parentage attributed to the variety by the Vitis International Variety Catalogue, which date the grape's creation to 1886 by private grape breeder Victor Ganzin.

=== Offspring ===
In 1958, University of California, Davis viticulturist Dr. Harold Olmo crossed Alicante Ganzin with the Portuguese wine grape variety Tinta Cão to produce the red-fleshed variety Rubired that is often used a coloring agent in red wine blends. Olmo also used Alicante Ganzin to cross with the Jura wine grape Trousseau gris to produce Royalty.
