= Tinta Fina =

Tinta Fina is an alternative name for several wine grape varieties including:

Tempranillo

- Alicante Bouschet
- Baga (grape)
- Grand Noir de la Calmette
