= Grand Noir de la Calmette =

Variety of grape

- Grape (Vitis)
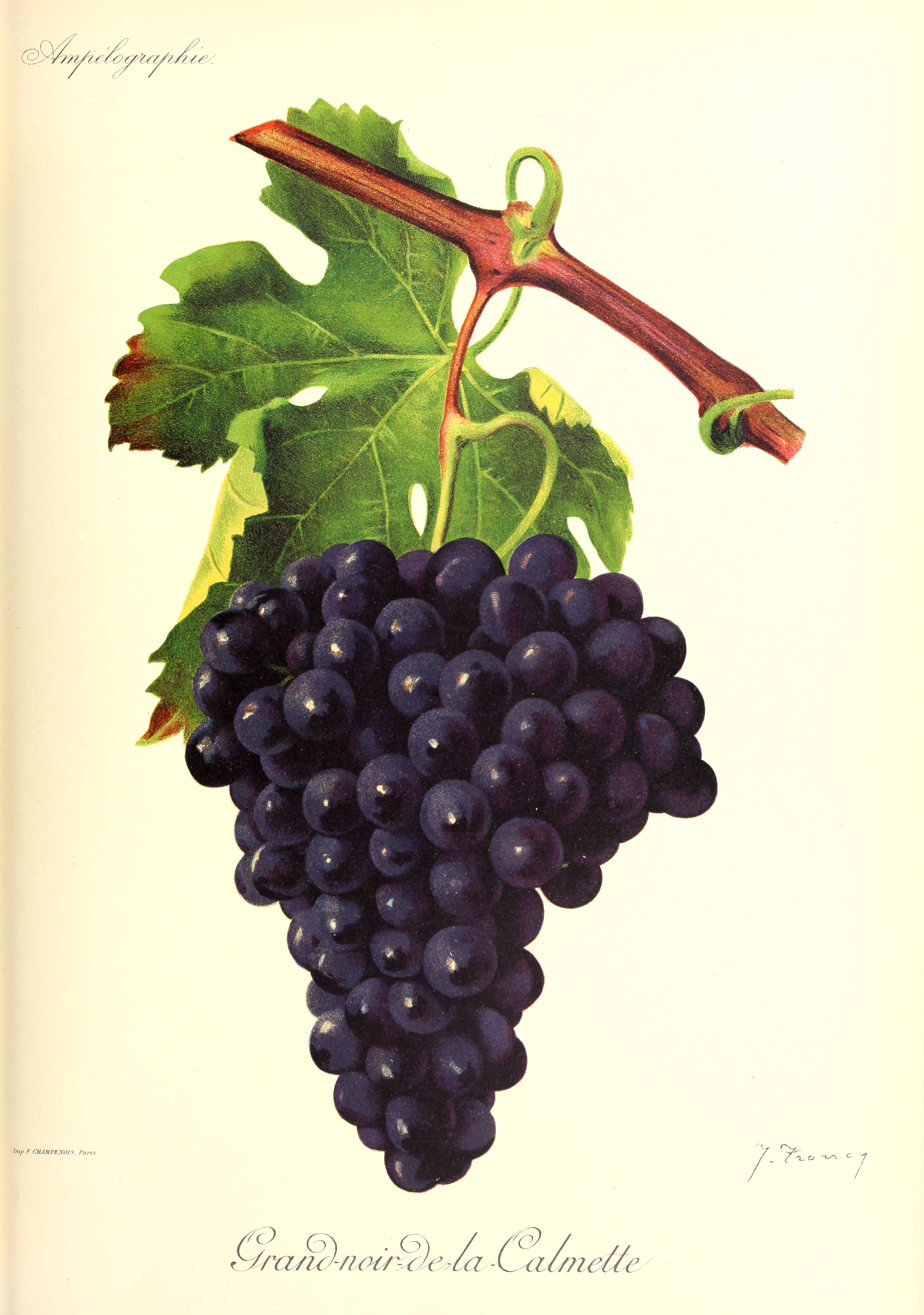
- Grand-noir-de-la-Calmette, colour plate from Ampélographie. Traité général de viticulture, Tome VI (1905)
- Color of berry skin: Black
- Species: Vitis vinifera
- Also called: Baga, Grand Noir, Grand Bouschet, Sumo tinto, Tinta (more)
- Origin: France
- Pedigree parent 1: Graciano
- Pedigree parent 2: Petit Bouschet
- Notable wines: Ribeira Sacra, Valdeorras, Portalegre
- Breeder: Henri Bouschet
- Year of crossing: 1855
- VIVC number: 5012

Grand Noir de la Calmette (French pronunciation: [ɡʁɑ̃ nwaʁ də la kalmɛt]; or simply Grand noir) is a red teinturier grape variety that is a crossing of Petit Bouschet and Aramon noir created in 1855 by French grape breeder Henri Bouschet at his vineyard in Mauguio in the Hérault department. The grape was named after the breeding station Domaine de la Calmette. As a teinturier, Grand noir is often used to add color to wines that it is blended into but is paler than other choices such as Alicante Bouschet. The vine tends to bud late and has a high productivity but with some susceptibility to the viticultural hazard of powdery mildew.

While Grand Noir de la Calmette originated in France and was once widely grown in the Cognac and Languedoc wine regions, today it is rarely planted in that country. Instead, the variety is predominantly found in the Spanish wine regions of Galicia in northwest Spain and in the southern Portuguese wine regions of Alentejo.

Grand Noir de la Calmette is often compared with its sibling grape, Alicante Bouschet, and the wines that both varieties produce tend to be very similar though Master of Wine Jancis Robinson notes that those made from Grand Noir de la Calmette tend to have more noticeable "peppery" spice.

== History ==
Grand Noir de la Calmette was created in 1855 by French grape breeder Henri Bouschet at his Domaine de la Calmette vineyard near Montpellier. The grape is a crossing of the Vitis vinifera species Aramon noir and Petit Bouschet (the later a crossing of Aramon and Teinturier du Cher created by Henri's father Louis Bouschet). That same year Bouschet use Petit Bouschet in another crossing with Graciano to create Morrastel Bouschet. At same point Morrastel Bouschet was introduced to the California as Grand Noir de la Calmette where it made its way to the grape collection at the UC Davis Department of Viticulture and Enology. The grapevines were misidentified until only recently when ampelographers discovered the error.

True Grand Noir de la Calmette does exist in California with two vineyards, in Windsor, California located in the Russian River Valley AVA of Sonoma County and Kuchan Cellars of Morgan Hill, California in Santa Clara Valley AVA having old vines that date back to the early 1900s.

== Viticulture and winemaking ==
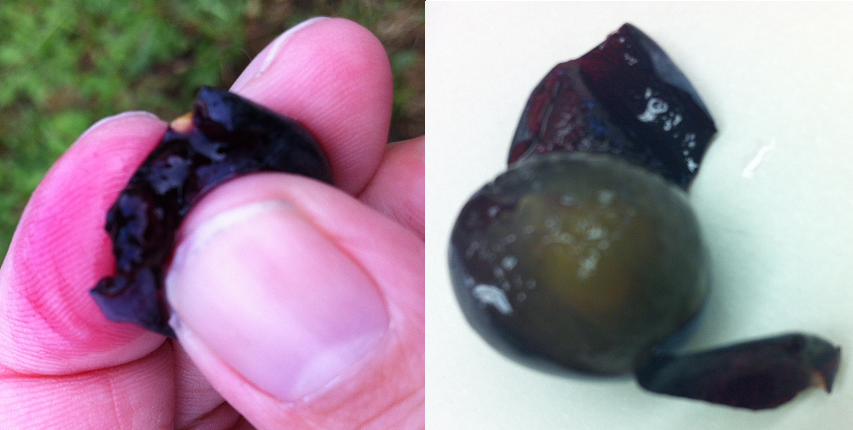
An example of the difference between a red fleshed teinturier grape (Agria left) and a red wine grape variety with its skin peeled off to show that its flesh and juice is naturally white (Grenache right). The vast majority of red wine grapes are like the Grenache on the right with the red color of wine coming from skin contact during winemaking.

Grand Noir de la Calmette is a high yielding grape variety that needs to be kept in check by winter pruning or green harvesting. It can be limited by plantings in vineyard soils of low fertility, however, vines planted in those types of soils do run the risk of shriveling. Among the viticultural hazards that Grand Noir de la Calmette is most susceptible to is powdery mildew.

While most wine grape varieties, even those such as Cabernet Sauvignon and Grenache used to make red wine, have "white flesh" that yield white or greyish colored juice, Grand Noir de la Calmette is a teinturier grape that has red color flesh that yields red colored juice without needing any skin contact to leach color into the wine. However, the juice of Grand Noir de la Calmette is very pale (especially compared to other Bouschet varieties such as Alicante Bouschet) so the wine often does see some maceration time.

== Wine regions ==
Grand Noir de la Calmette is planted throughout Galicia but is most often found in the Ribeira Sacra and Valdeorras DOs.

While Grand Noir de la Calmette originated in France, and was once widely planted in the Cognac and Languedoc wine region, today it is rarely planted in the country with less than 1 hectare (2.5 acres) in cultivation in 2008. The grape is much more prominent on the Iberian Peninsula with 885 hectares (2,190 acres) in Spain and 347 hectares (860 acres) in Portugal.

In Spain, Grand Noir de la Calmette is a permitted variety in the Denominación de Origen (DO) wines of Ribeira Sacra and Valdeorras. Here the grape seems to handle the humid climate of Galicia and is often used to add color to the wines. In Portugal, Grand Noir de la Calmette is found mostly in the Portalegre wine region of Alentejo where it is blended with Alicante Bouschet, Tempranillo and Trincadeira.

Outside of Europe, some plantings of the grape can be found in California where 100+ year old vines still exist in the Sonoma wine region of the Russian River Valley.

== Synonyms ==
Over the years, Grand noir has been known under a variety of synonyms including: Galliko, Gkiobrek Kara, Gkranoba, Grand Bouschet (in Alentejo region of Portugal), Gran Negro (in the Valdeorras DO of Spain), Gran Noar, Gran Nuar de Lya Kalmett, Grand Chernyi, Granoir, Granua, Gros noir (in the Pyrénées-Atlantiques department of France), Gros Producteur, Kalmettei Fekete, Kalmettei Nagy Fekete, Pe de Perdiz, Pe de Pombo, Sousao do Oeste, Sumo tinto (in Portugal), Tinta, Tinta Fina, Tinta Francesa and Tinturao.
