= Olmo grapes =

Variety of grape

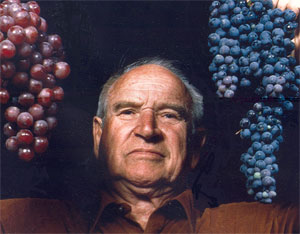
Harold Olmo

Olmo grapes are wine and table grape varieties produced by University of California, Davis viticulturist Dr. Harold Olmo. Over the course of his nearly 50-year career, Dr. Olmo bred a wide variety of both grapes by means of both crossing varieties from the same species or creating hybrid grapes from cultivars of different Vitis species.

Over 30 new grape varieties were created by Dr. Olmo and introduced to the California wine and table grape industries.

== Ruby Cabernet ==
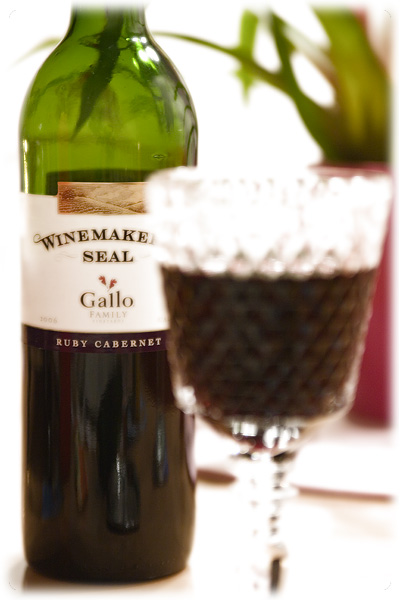
Ruby Cabernet wine.

Ruby Cabernet is the most notable and widely planted Olmo grape. It is a cross between the Vitis vinifera varieties Cabernet Sauvignon and Carignan that was first trialed by Dr. Olmo in 1936 before being released in 1948. The grape is primarily used in blending, adding color and tartness, but producers such as E & J Gallo Winery have produced varietal wines from the grape. According to wine expert Jancis Robinson, Ruby Cabernet can have some aromas reminiscent of a young Cabernet Sauvignon with the color of a Carignan but it lacks the structure and body to produce premium wines.

In California, the variety is widely planted in the Central Valley where it can withstand the hot continental climate of the valley and still produce harvest yields of 6 to 9 tons an acre. Outside of the United States, the variety can also be found in Australia, Argentina, Chile, Israel and South Africa.

== Rubired ==
Rubired is a hybrid of the vinifera variety Tinto Cão and Alicante Ganzin, which itself is a hybrid of Vitis rupestris Armon Rupestris Ganzin No. 4 and the vinifera crossing Alicante Bouschet. Trial breeding and testing were completed by Olmo in 1958.

Like Ruby Cabernet, it was bred to produce significant yields in hot climates, and in the California Central Valley it regularly yields 8 to 10 tons per acre. However, Rubired is a teinturier variety with pigmented, instead of clear, juice. Most red wine grapes have clear juice, the red color of wines coming from extraction of pigment from the grape skins. Rubired was originally intended for producing fortified port-style wines, and since the late 20th century, producers in Australia have included it in some port-style blends. Its intensely dark color is often useful in blending to intensify the color of other red wines, but it can also be used to create varietal wines.

== Emerald Riesling ==
Emerald Riesling is a white wine grape crossing between the vinifera varieties Riesling and Muscadelle. Trials on the variety began in 1936 and the variety was released in 1948 at the same time as Ruby Cabernet. Unlike many of the cool-climate Riesling crossings produced in Germany at facilities like Geisenheim Grape Breeding Institute, the Emerald Riesling was bred for warm climates like the San Joaquin Valley of California where today more than half of all Emerald Riesling plantings are found. Outside of California, there are limited plantings in South Africa. It is also used quite extensively in Israel, where big wineries use it to produce light, and aromatic - usually off-dry - wines. It comprises roughly 2.6% of the total grape production in Israel, totaling (in 2012) 1,408 tons.

According to wine expert Jancis Robinson, Emerald Riesling produces an aromatic, high acid wine that does not quite have the flavor definition more commonly associated with Riesling or its cool climate crossings. In cooler climate areas where it has been planted, such as the Monterey AVA, it can share some traits with Riesling but with a distinctly fuller body.

Emerald Riesling is also known under the synonyms California 1139 E 29, Emerald Rizling, and Riesling Izumrudnii.

== Other wine grapes ==
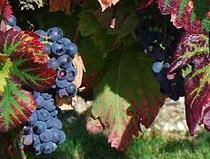
Dr. Olmo frequently used Carignan (pictured) in his crossings.

- Carnelian is a crossing of the Vitis vinifera Carignan and a separate vinifera crossing between Cabernet Sauvignon and Grenache. It was created in 1972 to combine the genetic traits that allow Carignan and Grenache to produce well in warm climates with some of flavor and wine characteristics of Cabernet Sauvignon.
- Centurian (also known as Centurion) is a vinifera crossing between Carignan and a separate crossing of Cabernet Sauvignon and Grenache. The grape was developed by Dr Olmo in 1975 matching the same grape varieties used to produce the Carnelian grape a few years earlier. Today it is mostly planted in the Central Valley of California.
- Flora is a crossing of two vinifera varieties, Semillon and Gewürztraminer, that was created in 1938 by Dr. Olmo at the California Agricultural Experiment Station. A separate red Flora hybrid exist but it is not related in any way to the Olmo Flora.
- Royalty is a crossing of the Vitis vinifera Trousseau gris variety from the Jura wine region of France and the teinturier grape Alicante Ganzin that, itself, is a hybrid of a Vitis rupestris variety and the Vitis vinifera grape Aramon. The variety was first developed in 1938 but wasn't released for commercial use until 1958 when it was released with Rubired.
- Symphony is a crossing of the vinifera varieties Muscat of Alexandria and Grenache gris. that Dr. Olmo first began developing in 1948. It took over 30 years to complete crossing trials and produce a viable cultivar. Symphony was finally completed and introduced commercially in 1981 and patented in 1983. The grape makes a white wine with a slight spiciness with tree fruit aromas of citrus, apricot and peach. It is primarily a blending grape but can be made into a varietal wine.

== See also ==
- Seibel grapes
- Rogers' Hybrids
