= Petit Bouschet =

Variety of grape

Petit Bouschet is a red teinturier grape variety that is a crossing of Aramon noir and Teinturier du Cher created in 1824 by French grape breeder Louis Bouschet at his vineyard in Mauguio in the Hérault department. The grape was used by Louis' son, Henri Bouschet, to create several more varieties including Alicante Bouschet, Grand Noir de la Calmette and Morrastel Bouschet. Petit Bouschet saw a surge of plantings in the late 19th century as France recovered from the phylloxera epidemic where it was often used to add color to blends made from hybrid grapes and other high yielding varieties. As its offspring Alicante Bouschet became more popular, plantings of Petit Bouschet fell off and the grape is now hardly found in France.

== History and relationship to other grapes ==
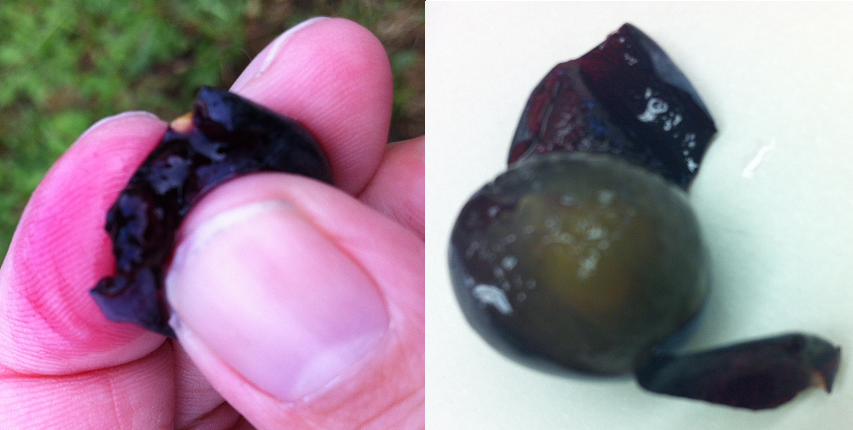
An example of the difference between a red fleshed teinturier grape (Agria left) and a red wine grape variety with its skin peeled off to show that its flesh and juice is naturally white (Grenache right). The vast majority of red wine grapes are like the Grenache on the right with the red color of wine coming from skin contact during winemaking.

Petit Bouschet was created in 1824 by grape breeder Louis Bouschet at his Domaine de la Camette vineyard and breeding station near Montpellier in southern France. The grape is a crossing of two Vitis vinifera varieties, Aramon noir and the red-flesh Teinturier du Cher. This makes Petit Bouschet a crossing and not a hybrid grape which would have parents from two difference species from the genus Vitis. While Aramon noir is like most red-skinned Vitis vinifera varieties, such as Cabernet Sauvignon and Syrah, in having white flesh which yields white or greyish color juice when pressed soon after harvest, Petit Bouschet inherited red-flesh from Teinturier du Cher. This means that Petit Bouschet can produce red colored wine without needing long periods of skin contact to leach out the color compounds from the grape skins into the wine.

Louis Bouschet's son, Henri, would use Petit Bouschet to breed several more crossings including Alicante Bouschet (with Grenache), Grand Noir de la Calmette (with Aramon) and Morrastel Bouschet (with Graciano). In the early 21st century, some ampelographers suspected that Petit Bouschet may have been a parent vine for the Provençal wine grape Téoulier but DNA profiling has disproved that suggestion. The grape was also historically associated with the Galician wine grape Juan García dues to the similarities in synonyms, particularly with Petit Bouschet also being known as Negrón de Aldán in the Denominación de Origen (DO) region of Bierzo. However, DNA evidence has also dispelled any link between the two varieties.

== Viticulture ==
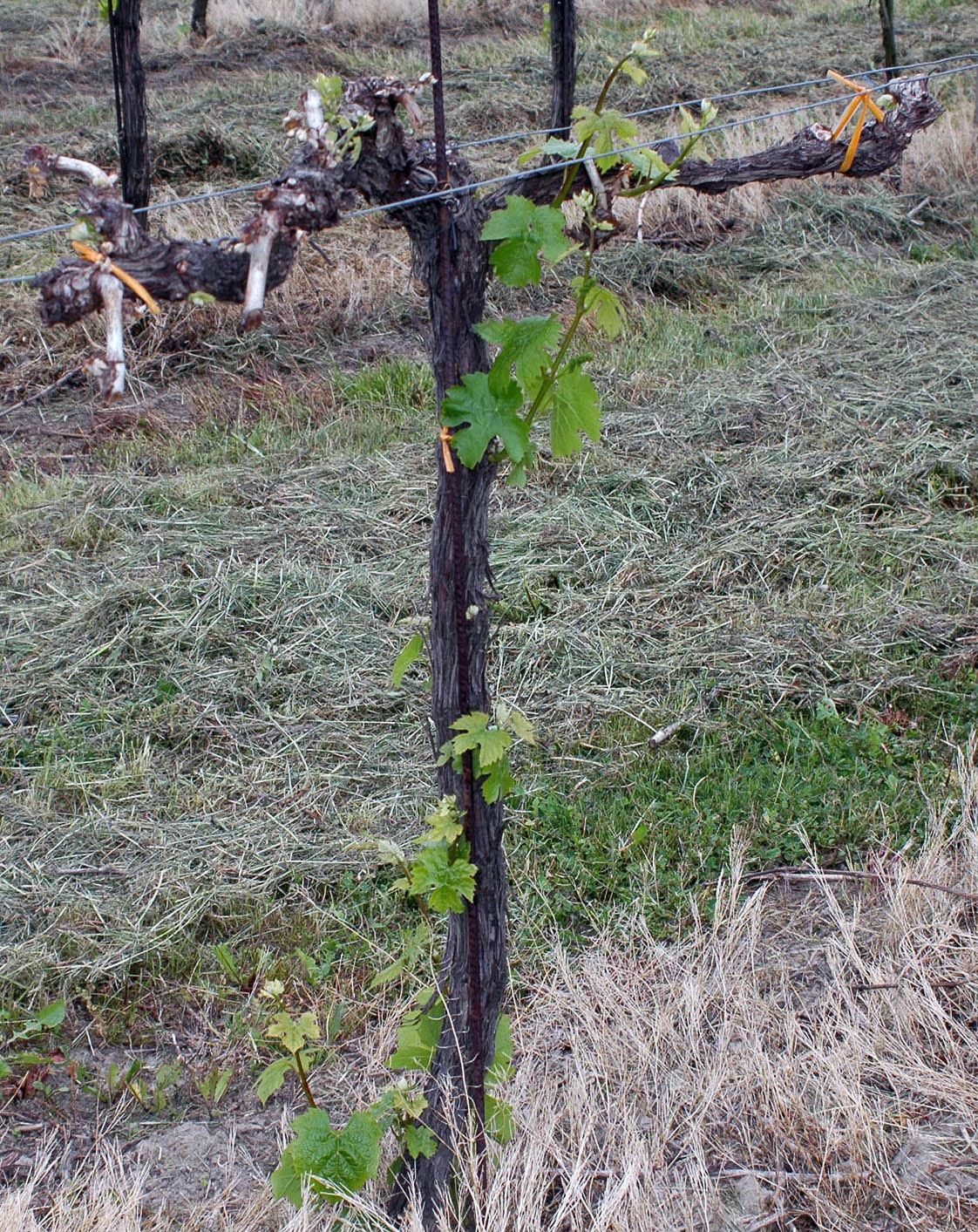
Petit Bouschet is prone to developing excessive amounts of basal shoots (or "suckers") that grow on the trunk of the grape and sap needed resources away from other parts of the vine.

Petit Bouschet is an early to mid-ripening variety that also buds early which can make it prone to damage from early spring frost in some areas. The vine can be very vigorous and high yielding if not kept in check by winter pruning and green harvesting. Petit Bouschet also has a tendency to produce numerous basal shoots that grow on the trunk of the grapevine below the cordons. Also known as "suckers", these shoots can sap the vine of nutritional and water resources that would otherwise be funneled into developing and ripening the grape clusters and will need to be removed throughout the growing season. Other viticultural hazards that Petit Bouschet is susceptible to include infection from erinose mites.

== Wine regions ==
Petit Bouschet was widely planted throughout the southern wine regions of France in the late 19th century but today it is hardly found in the country with its offspring, Alicante Bouschet, largely taking over its role of adding color to wine blends. There are some plantings of the grape in North Africa, particularly Algeria, and in 2009 there were 11 hectares (27 acres) of the Petit Bouschet growing in Portugal.

== Synonyms ==
Over the years, Petit Bouschet has been known under a variety of synonyms including: Aramon-Teinturier, Bouschet, Bouschet de Bernard, Bouschet Petit, Le Bouschet, Negrón de Aldán (in Bierzo region in Spain), Petit Bouse, Pit Bushe and Tintinha (in Portugal).
