= Passaggio Wines =

Winery in Sonoma, California

- Location: 14301 Arnold Drive, Glen Ellen, California, United States
- Coordinates: 38°17′29.11″N 122°27′26.21″W
- Founded: 2007
- First vintage: 2007
- Opened to the public: 2014
- Key people: Cynthia Cosco
- Cases/yr: 1,700
- Known for: Unoaked Chardonnay
- Varietals: Chardonnay, Sauvignon blanc, Pinot grigio, Roussanne, Grenache, Pinot Noir, Merlot, Chenin blanc, Trousseau gris
- Distribution: limited
- Tasting: open to public
- Website: passaggiowines.com

Passaggio Wines is a winery based in Sonoma, California in the United States.

== History ==
Passaggio Wines was founded by Cynthia Cosco in 2007. The winery's name translates into "passage way" in Italian. The name was inspired by her own family's immigration to the United States from Italy in the early 20th century.

Prior to being a winemaker, Cosco worked in law enforcement in Virginia for 15 years. Cosco moved to California in 2004. She worked in a liquor store prior to working at a winery. Cosco served as the lab manager at Crushpad in San Francisco and eventually became the company's winemaker for white wines.

== Wine ==
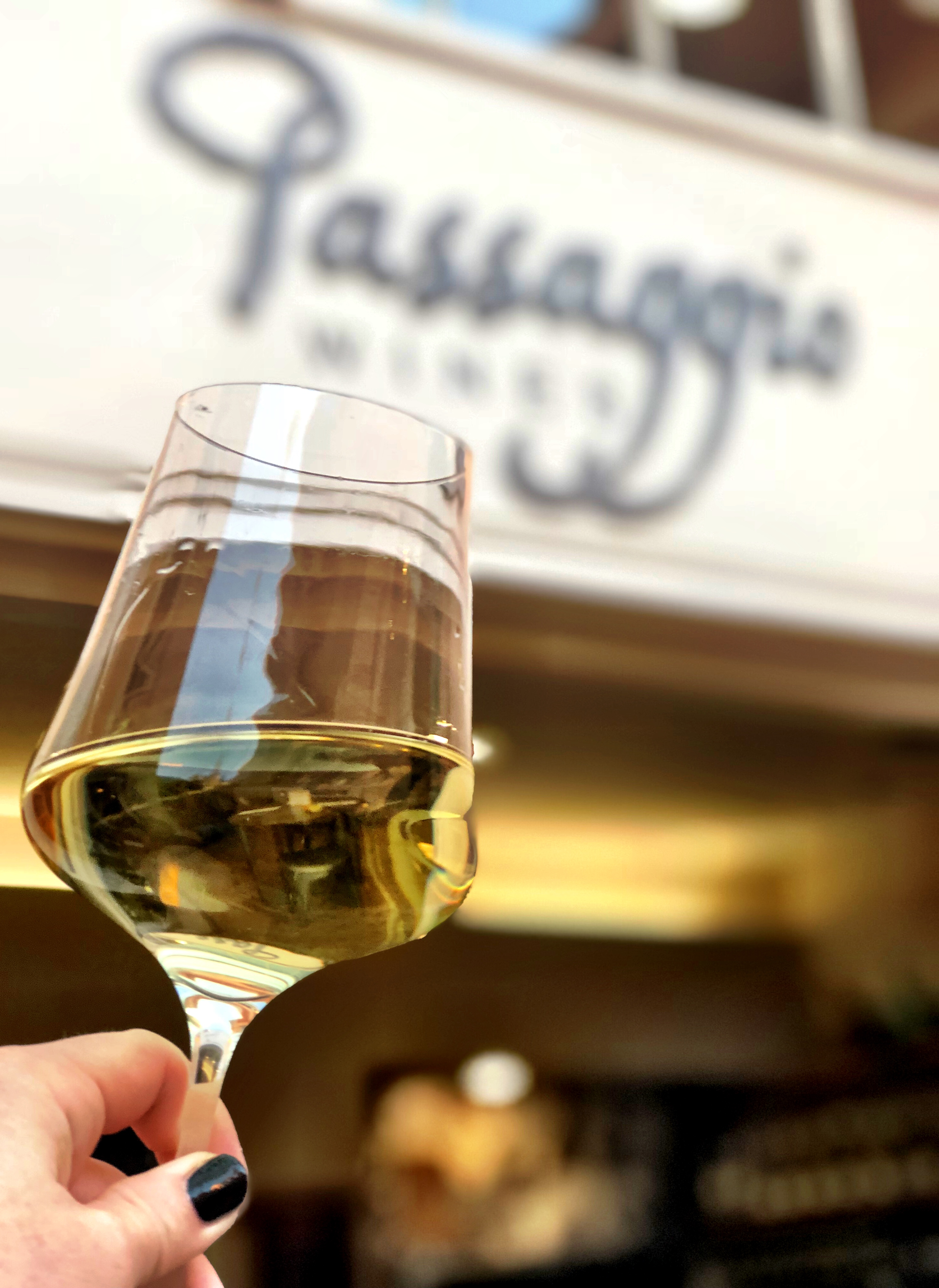
A glass of Passaggio's signature Unoaked Chardonnay

Passaggio makes a variety of wines and has four proprietary wines: an Unoaked chardonnay, sauvignon blanc, pinot grigio, rosé, pinot noir, and varietals rare in American viticulture, including trousseau gris and chenin blanc. The Unoaked chardonnay and pinot grigio have no malolactic fermentation and is aged in stainless steel. The rosé is a dry wine titled "Rose Colored Glasses." Cosco began making pinot noir in 2011.

Cosco produces a series of wines called New Generation, which includes experimental varietals and wines outside of the proprietary releases. Wine varietals used in the series include sauvignon blanc and in 2015 she released a merlot rose. In 2016, Passaggio's 2014 New Generation Sauvignon Blanc, produced from Russian River AVA grapes, scored 90 points in Wine Enthusiast.

Passaggio produces wine at their production facility in Sonoma.
