= Bierzo (DO) =

Protected wine denomination of Spain

Coordinates: 42°33′N 6°35′W

Bierzo DOP
- Wine region
- Bierzo DOP in the province of León in the region of Castile and León
- Official name: C.R.D.O. Bierzo
- Type: Denominación de Origen Protegida (DOP)
- Year established: 1989
- Country: Spain
- Size of planted vineyards: 2,854 hectares (7,052 acres)
- No. of wineries: 70
- Wine produced: 40,729 hectolitres
- Comments: Data for 2016 / 2017

Bierzo is a Spanish Denominación de Origen Protegida (DOP) for wines located in the northwest of the province of León (Castile and León, Spain) and covers about 3,000 km^{2}. It borders on the provinces of Ourense, Lugo and Asturias in the north and in the south on areas of La Montaña, la Cabrera and La Meseta, in Léon. The area consists of numerous small valleys in the mountainous part (Alto Bierzo) and of a wide, flat plain (Bajo Bierzo). The DO covers 23 municipalities including the largest town of the area, Ponferrada (population about 70,000).

The Bierzo cultivation area is located in the tectonic basin of the Bercian part of the Sil River valley.

The wines of this designation of origin are made exclusively with authorized grape varieties. Among the reds, Mencía stands out, and among the whites, Doña Blanca and Godello are prominent. Additionally, three experimental varieties are included, although they are pending the corresponding authorization from the Junta of Castilla y León. Currently, this designation is among those with the greatest international projection in Spain.

== History ==
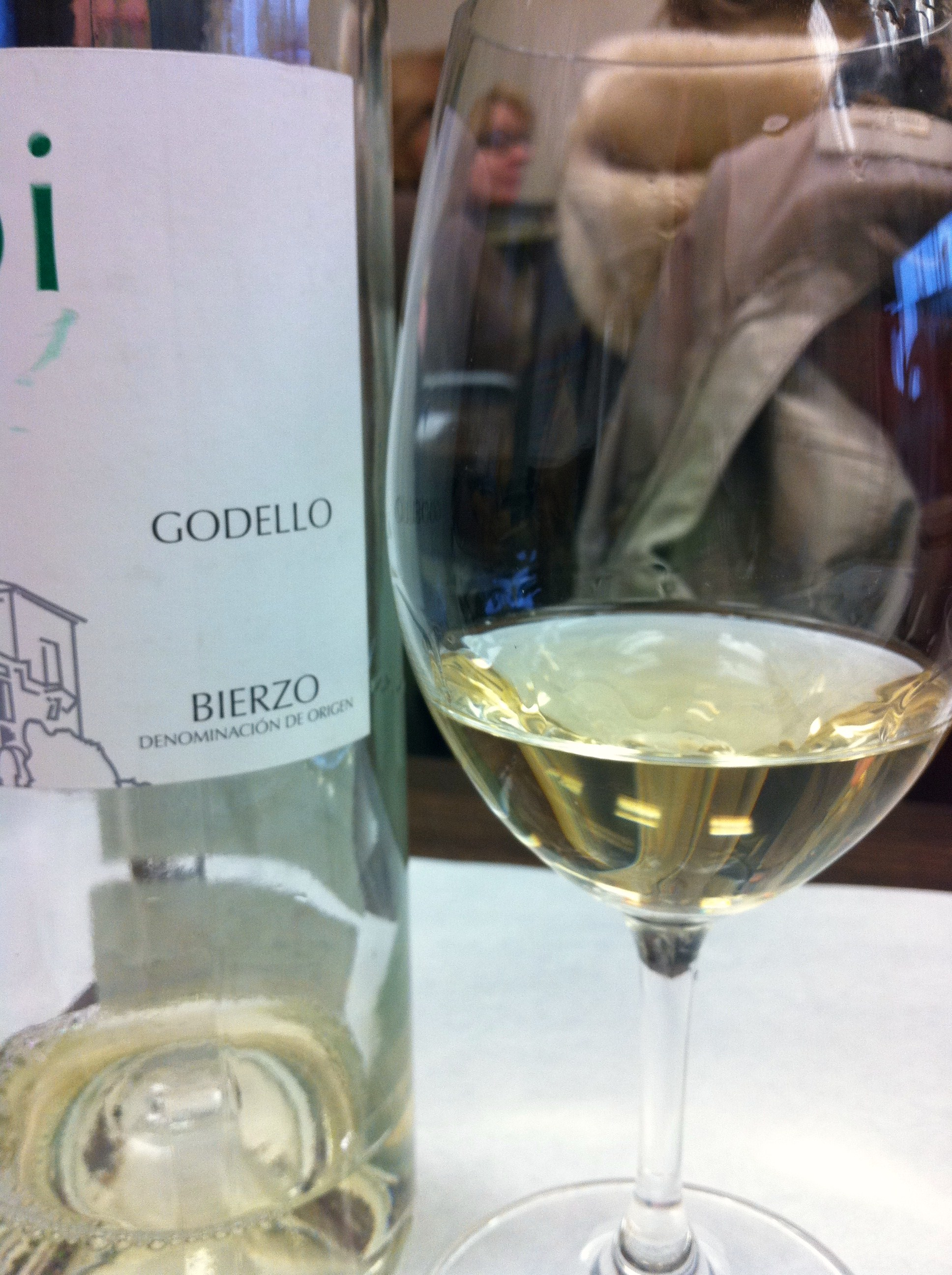
A Godello from Bierzo.

The first written reference to the Bierzo region, whose name derives from the pre-Roman city of Bergidum, is from Pliny the Elder. The Romans developed agriculture, introduced new crops including Vitis vinifera vines, and new technology such as the Roman plough. However, the greatest expansion of viticulture was related to the growth of the monasteries, especially the Cistercian order, during the Middle Ages. After centuries of production and after having achieved a good reputation in the markets of Galicia and Asturias, the Bierzo vineyards suffered a terrible blow in the 19th century when the phylloxera plague practically wiped them out. There was a severe economic crisis which forced many people to emigrate. Production was slowly re-established thanks to the technique of grafting onto new world rootstocks and wine production gradually recovered to assume the significant economic role it had played in the past. In 1989 the Bierzo Denominación de Origen was officially recognised.

The history of wine in Bierzo continued in a steady and traditional manner in the first half of the 20th century. Dedicated vintners managed their vineyards and wineries as an important part of the family farming operations. Wine made a significant contribution to the household economy, and the primary markets supplied with wines from the region remained local, particularly Galicia and Asturias.

Following the periods of war and a difficult post-war era, rural exodus intensified, putting the continuity of family farms at clear risk. The fragmentation and lack of unity among vintners, along with the scarcity of large wineries and grape buyers, led to a drop in grape prices. For this reason, cooperativism, which emerged in the 1960s under Franco's regime, became a genuine necessity for small producers. The first cooperative was established in Camponaraya in 1963 on the initiative of José Pérez Martínez, who would become its first president. Subsequently, cooperatives were formed in Cacabelos, Villafranca (1964), Cabañas Raras (1965), Ponferrada (1966), and Arganza (1967). For thirty years, these cooperatives proved to be an effective model for maintaining historic vineyards and improving the quality of their wines, both bottled and bulk. These cooperatives and the efforts of their members preserved the old Bercian vineyards, which are now admired worldwide.

A significant milestone for the region came with the recognition of a designation of origin for the area's wines. The Bierzo Designation of Origin was provisionally recognized on June 3, 1988, and the provisional Regulatory Council was appointed on October 3, 1988.

Subsequently, on November 11, 1989, the Bierzo Designation of Origin was officially recognized, and the Regulations for the Bierzo Designation of Origin and its Regulatory Council were approved and published in the Spanish Official Gazette (B.O.E.) on December 12, 1989.

In this new context, notable figures in Bercian wine emerged, such as Bernardo Álvarez, Bernardo Luna, José Luis Santín Vázquez, and Paco Pérez Caramés, who in various ways revolutionized the concept of the region's wines. Some introduced foreign grape varieties, others applied organic farming practices, and some implemented extensive aging periods for the wines. In all cases, they contributed to improving wine quality and modernized facilities and marketing strategies.

As the 21st century progressed and with the arrival of the prestigious Rioja winemaker Álvaro Palacios to the area, new modernization projects and winery creations emerged, opening an international horizon for Bierzo wines. Names of young winemakers such as Raúl Pérez, Amancio Fernández, Alfredo Marqués, Luis Peique, and Ginés García became prominent.

Although the 2008 crisis partially slowed down aspirations for the region's wines, after the crisis, small-scale projects inspired by garage wine-making emerged. This new wave places a strong emphasis on the recovery of old vineyards through organic farming techniques, focusing more on viticulture than enology. Among the leading figures of this movement are Verónica Ortega, José Mas Asturias, Nacho León, and the Bordeaux native Grégory Pérez.

According to data provided by the Regulatory Council of the Bierzo Designation of Origin for the year 2022, the registered vineyard area covers 2,349 hectares. The total number of vintners is 1,110, and there are 74 facilities or wineries affiliated with the designation.

== Climate ==
The Bierzo DOP has a special microclimate which is beneficial for viticulture. On the one hand it is similar to the climate of Galicia with regard to humidity and rainfall, and on the other it is also similar to the hot, dry climate of Castile. The low altitude also helps to prevent late frosts and means that the grape harvest is usually about one month earlier than in Castile. The average annual temperature is around 12°C, with the minimum in winter of 3.5°C and maximum in summer of 30°C. The average annual rainfall is just over 700 mm, and the vines receive about 2,200 hours of sunshine per year.

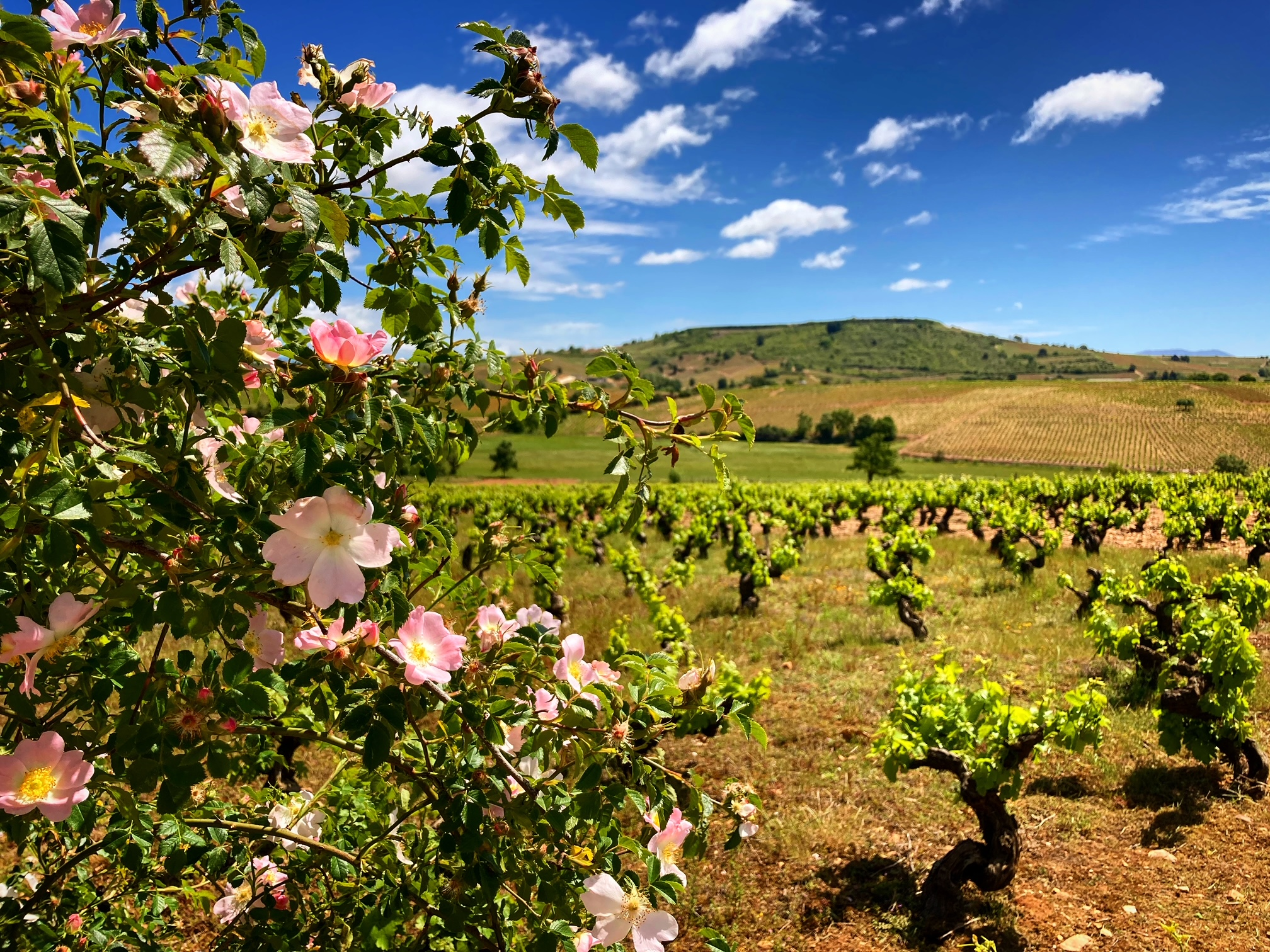
Villegas old vines

The climate of Bierzo also plays a crucial role in soil formation. The combination of geology and climatic conditions affects the rate of rock erosion and decomposition processes, as well as the formation of soil horizons.

In summary, the geology of Bierzo, with the presence of metamorphic rocks in the Cantabrian Mountains and igneous rocks in the Montes de León, contributes to the diversity of soils in the region. The resulting soils can vary in texture, mineral composition, and physical properties, which in turn influence the land's ability to support different types of vegetation and crops.

The soils in Bierzo are varied, ranging from red clays and stony soils to slate soils and quartz sands. Generally, the soil has a moderately acidic pH of approximately 5.5, with no presence of carbonates, a common feature of humid climates.

The vineyard soil in Bierzo is composed of Miocene materials covered by an upper layer of Quaternary deposits. Additionally, the soils on the slopes contain a mixture of heavy elements from quartzite and slate.

One of the most common soil types in the region is red clay, found in the lower part of the valley. This red clay is rich in iron and other minerals, making it ideal for vine cultivation. Another common soil type in Bierzo is slate, found on the higher slopes of the region. Conservative soil cultivation techniques play an important role, compared to conventional tillage, in preserving biodiversity, maintaining soil fertility, and sustaining the vegetative-productive balance.

== Soils ==
The soils in the mountains consist of a mixture of fine elements, quartz and slate. The vineyards are planted mainly on humid, dark soil which is slightly acidic and low in carbonates.

The soils in this area are relatively poor in phosphorus and limestone, with an average pH around 6. However, the fine detrital deposits present, composed of clays, sandstones, quartzites, and slates, are very conducive to vine cultivation. The general texture of these soils is loam-clay, with regular stoniness and an absence of rockiness, except in specific cases.

Villegas, a historic site in Valtuille de Abajo (Bierzo) The soil morphology is acidic, without the presence of carbonates, which is characteristic of humid climates, and it shows a high water retention capacity. Additionally, some vineyards are located on steep slopes with a notable presence of loose slates. Occasionally, vineyards are found in alluvial bottoms known as "patales," characterized by their moisture and fertility, with especially high yields but a high risk of spring frosts.

== Grape varieties ==
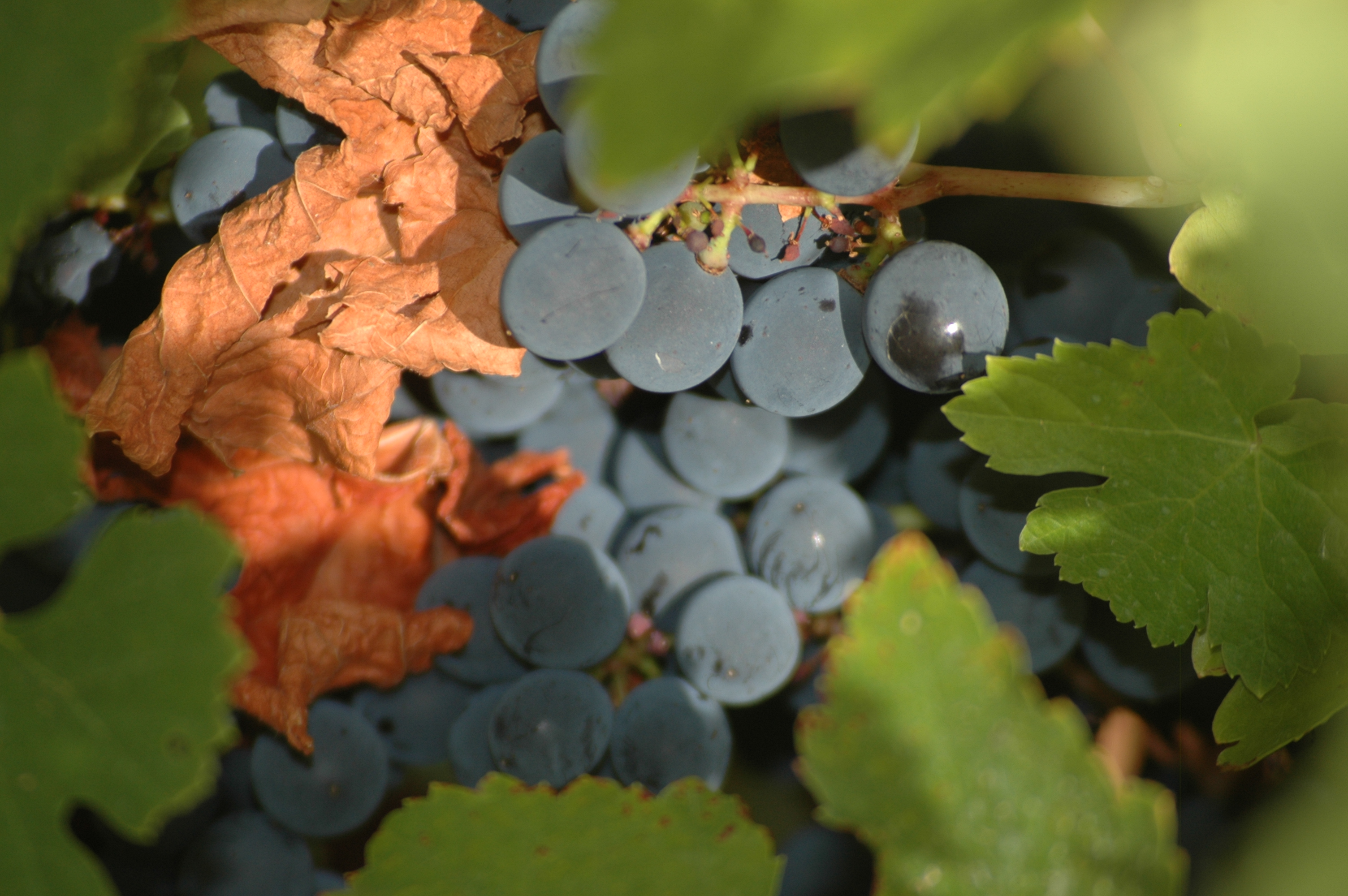
Mencia grapes at harvest time in Bierzo.

The wines produced under the Bierzo DPO must be made only with the varieties that are authorised by the Consejo Regulador (Regulatory Council).

- Red grapes: Mencía and Alicante Bouschet (Garnacha Tintorera), Merenzao y Estaladiña.
- White grapes: Doña Blanca, Godello, Palomino, and Malvasía.

== Wines produced ==
1. Young whites: Made with Doña Blanca, Godello and Palomino. Between 10° and 13°.
2. Young reds: Made with a minimum of 70% Mencía. Between 11° and 14°.
3. Aged wines without crianza: the vintage must be shown on the label and certain criteria complied with.
4. Rosé wines: made with a minimum of 50% Mencía and may contain white grapes.
5. Crianza wines: Minimum of 6 months in oak casks plus 18 months in the bottle.
6. Reserva wines: Minimum of 12 months in oak barrels plus 24 months in the bottle for red wines; minimum of 6 months in oak casks and 18 months in the bottle for whites.
