= Flora (grape) =

Variety of grape

Flora is the name of two unrelated varieties of grape, one white and one red, both of United States origin.

== White Flora ==
The white Flora is a California wine grape. It is a crossing of Semillon and Gewürztraminer, both Vitis vinifera varieties, and it was created in 1938 by Harold P. Olmo at the California Agricultural Experiment Station.

== Red Flora ==
The red Flora is an interspecific hybrid between V. vinifera and Vitis labrusca, and it was created in 1850 by A. M. Spangler.

== See also ==
- Olmo grapes
