= Monterrei (DO) =

Coordinates: 41°57′48″N 7°26′57″W

Monterrei DOP
- Wine region
- Monterrei DOP in the province of Ourense in the region of Galicia
- Type: Denominación de Origen Protegida (DOP)
- Year established: 1994
- Country: Spain
- Size of planted vineyards: 566 hectares (1,399 acres)
- No. of wineries: 25
- Wine produced: 28,531 hectolitres
- Comments: Data for 2016 / 2017

Monterrei is a Spanish Denominación de Origen Protegida (DOP) (Denominación de Orixe Protexida in Galician) for wines located in the southeast corner of the province of Ourense in Galicia, Spain. It covers the municipalities of Verín, Monterrei, Oimbra, Castrelo do Val, Riós and Vilaredvós.

Long a neglected DO, Monterrei became suddenly relevant and production has boomed as some of its wines were praised by wine critic Robert M. Parker, Jr. in March 2008.

== History ==
It is believed that it was the ancient Romans who first introduced grape growing and wine making in this region. The wines from Monterrei were renowned during the Middle Ages. As Federico Justo Méndez stated in his book Brotes de Raíces Históricas: “The wines from the Monterrei valley, due to their excellent quality, were on a par with the wines from Porto, and for a time were sold all over Latin America”.

Exports increased during the reign of Philip II, especially as the 5th Count of Monterrei was nominated viceroy to the new Spanish colonies in the New World. It was around this time that the city of Monterrey in Mexico was founded.

In modern times, most of the wine produces is still sold in bulk, but pioneering wineries have started to bottle and market their own brands.

Provisional DO status was originally acquired in the 1980s but was suspended. It was not until the 1994 that it was recovered.

== Geography ==
The vines grow on the sides of the valleys around the river Tâmega. The main town is Verín. The vineyards are at an altitude that varies between 400 and 450 m above sea level.

There are two different sub-zones: Val de Monterrei (Monterrei Valley) and Ladeira de Monterrei (Monterrei slopes). The vines cover an area of about 3000 hectares, even though not all of them are covered by the DOP.

== Soils ==
The fertile, clayey soils, humid climate, high vine density and the yield of the local grape varieties means that wine production is high at 50 hectolitres per hectare.

== Climate ==
Monterrei is the warmest and driest area in Galicia, sharing some climatic characteristics with the Spanish central plain. The Serra do Larouco range produces a rain shadow effect in the area. Besides, summers are long and sometimes dry, sometimes with a daily temperature range sometimes as wide as 30 degrees Celsius. Temperatures can fall below 0 °C in winter. Average annual rainfall is about 700 mm and the influence of the Atlantic produces cold autumns.

== Grapes ==
Recommended red grapes: Mencía and Merenzao; also authorized are Araúxa / Tempranillo, Caiño Tinto and Sousón.

Recommended white grapes: Doña Blanca, Godello, and Treixadura; also authorized are Albariño, Blanca de Monterrei, Caiño Branco, and Loureira.

As most vineyards have been planted recently, they are on trellises (en espaldera) so as to maximize their exposure to the sun.

== See also ==
- Galician wine
- Spanish wine
