= Royalty (grape) =

Variety of grape

- Grape (Vitis)
- Color of berry skin: Noir
- Species: American Vitis hybrid
- Also called: Royalty 1390, California S 26, Kek Royalti and Royalti
- Origin: United States 1938
- Original pedigree: Trousseau gris × Alicante Ganzin
- Pedigree parent 1: Trousseau gris
- Pedigree parent 2: Alicante Ganzin
- Notable regions: California wine
- VIVC number: 10288

Royalty (also known as Royalty 1390) is a rouge Californian wine grape variety that was developed in 1938 by Dr. Harold P. Olmo of the University of California, Davis. The grape is a red fleshed teinturier which, unlike most red wine grapes, will produce red-tinged colored wine even without maceration time on the skins. The grape is a hybrid produced from the Vitis vinifera Trousseau gris variety from the Jura wine region of France and the teinturier grape Alicante Ganzin that is itself a hybrid of a Vitis rupestris variety and the Vitis vinifera grape Aramon.

== History ==
Royalty was first cultivated by Dr. Olmo in 1938 at the California Agricultural Experiment Station of UC-Davis but wasn't released for commercial use until 1958. It was released at the same time as Rubired, another Olmo teinturier with Alicante Ganzin parentage. Like Rubired, Royalty was mostly grown in the Central Valley of California where it was used a blending grape to improve the color of red wines. However, Royalty showed itself to be more difficult to cultivate than Rubired and fell out of favor among many growers. While by the end of the 20th century there was still more than 6,000 acres (2,500 hectares) of Rubired in production in California there were only around 800 acres (320 ha) of Royalty in use.

== Synonyms ==
Among the synonyms that Royalty has been known as include California S 26, Kek Royalti and Royalti.
