= Versoaln =

Variety of grape

Coordinates: 46.5538°N 11.1842°E

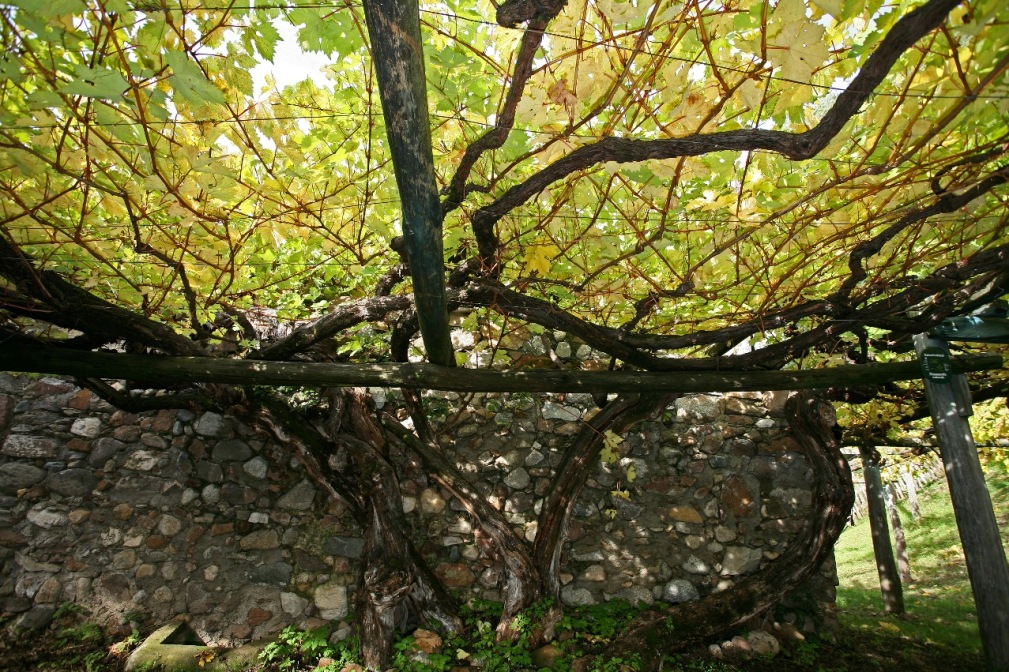
A segment of the 350+ year old, 350m^{2} long Versoaln vine planted outside Katzenzungen Castle in South Tyrol.

Versoaln (or Versailler) is a white Italian wine grape variety that is grown in the South Tyrol wine region of northeast Italy. In the commune of Tisens, in South Tyrol, one of the world's oldest vines is a Versoaln vine planted at Katzenzungen Castle that has been dated to be at least 350 years old by the viticulturists at the University of Göttingen.

== History ==
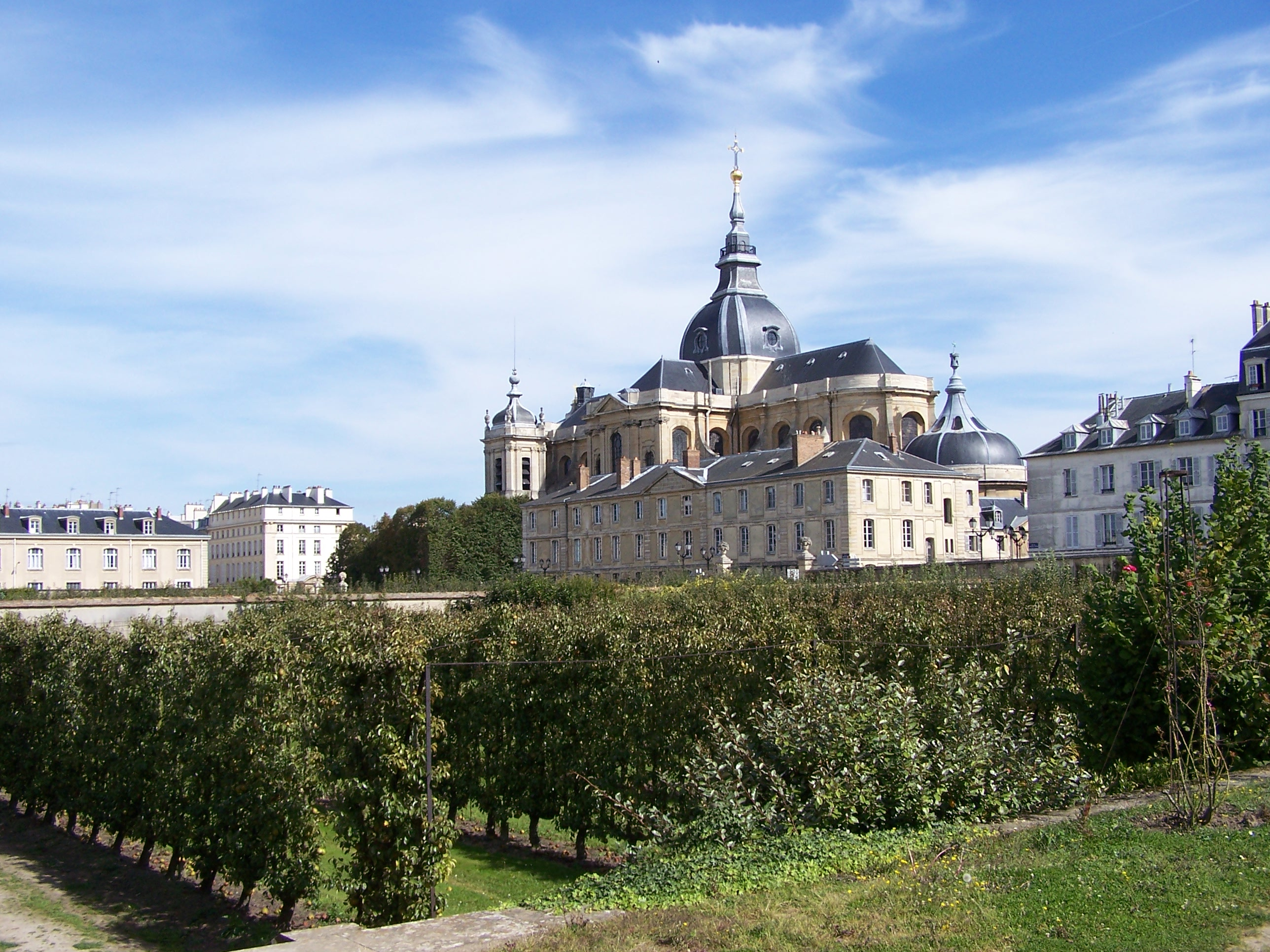
According to one legend, the Versoaln vine was once planted at Versailles and brought to Italy by the owner of Katzenzungen Castle

According to legend, the Versoaln vine is named after the French royal Palace of Versailles that was home to King Louis XIV from where the vine was reportedly brought to Katzenzungen Castle by Grafen Schlandesberg. However, ampelographers doubt the validity of this origin theory due to lack of historical evidence as well as DNA evidence showing a connection between Versoaln and any known French wine grape variety.

Ampelographers note that the root of Versoaln's name in the local dialect of South Tyrol means "to secure with a rope" and could be a reference to the viticultural practice of trellising where the canopy of the vine is secured by rope or wires to a trellis. Another theory is that the name is derived from verdolen, which means "green" in the local language, and describes the deep green color of the berries before veraison.

== Viticulture ==
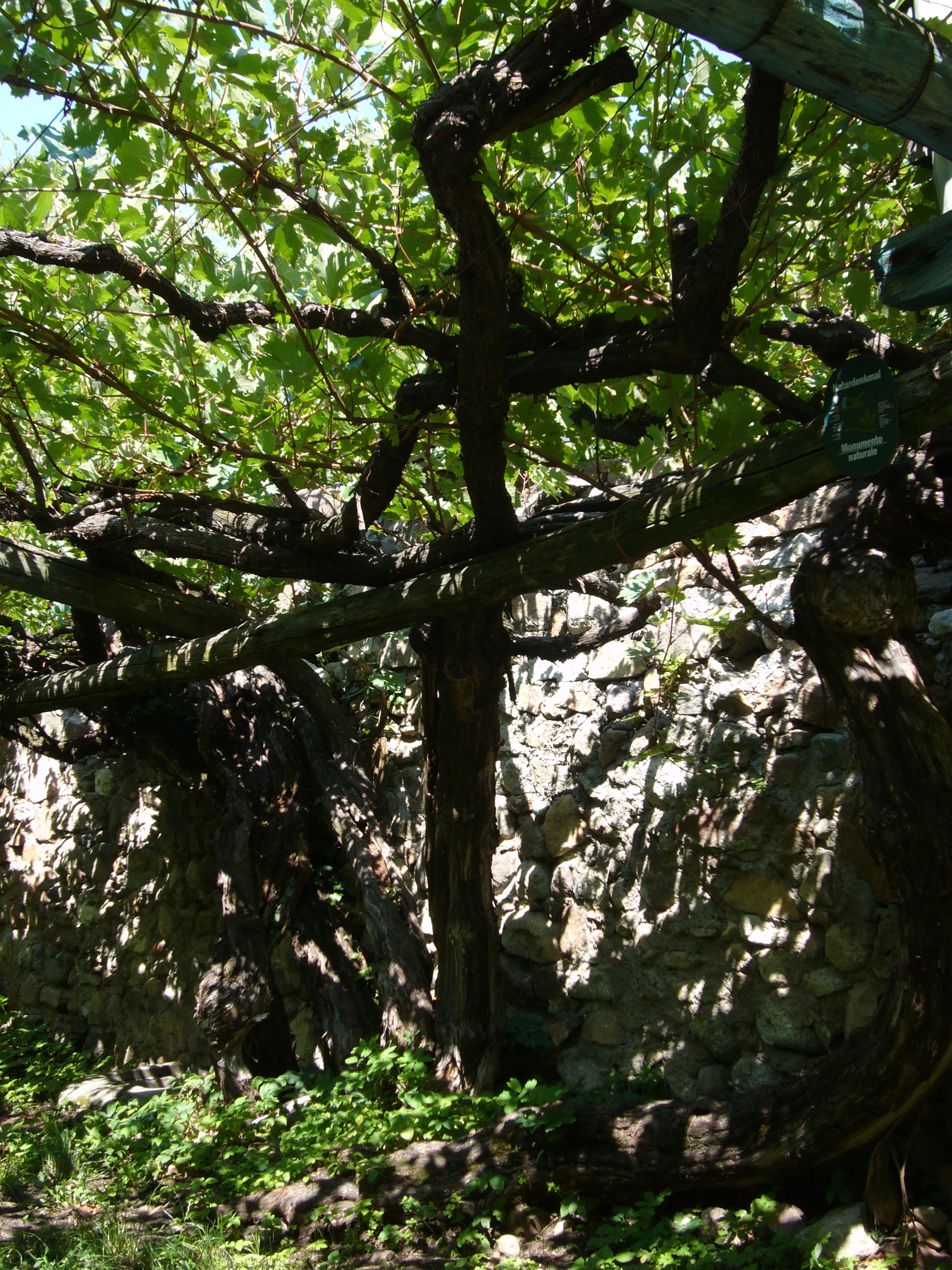
A segment of the Katzenzungen Versoaln vine.

Similar to the German/Italian grape variety Trollinger (Schiava Grossa), Versoaln has the tendency to produce large berries of thick-skinned grapes in similarly large, irregularly shaped bunches that can put a great strain on the vine if not properly managed by vine training and pruning. The vine tends to bud midway through the budding period of the growing season and is also considered a "mid-ripening" variety. Versoaln is very susceptible to the viticultural hazards of sour rot and the fungal infections of downy and powdery mildew.

== Wine regions ==
While once widely planted throughout the South Tyrol region, Versoaln was on the verge of extinction until viticulturists with the Laimburg Research Centre for Agriculture and Forestry and Free University of Bozen-Bolzano started propagating cuttings from the single, 350+ year old Versoaln vine planted at Katzenzungen Castle. As of 2012, there were approximately 100 new vine plantings of Versoaln in cultivation.

=== Katzenzungen vine ===
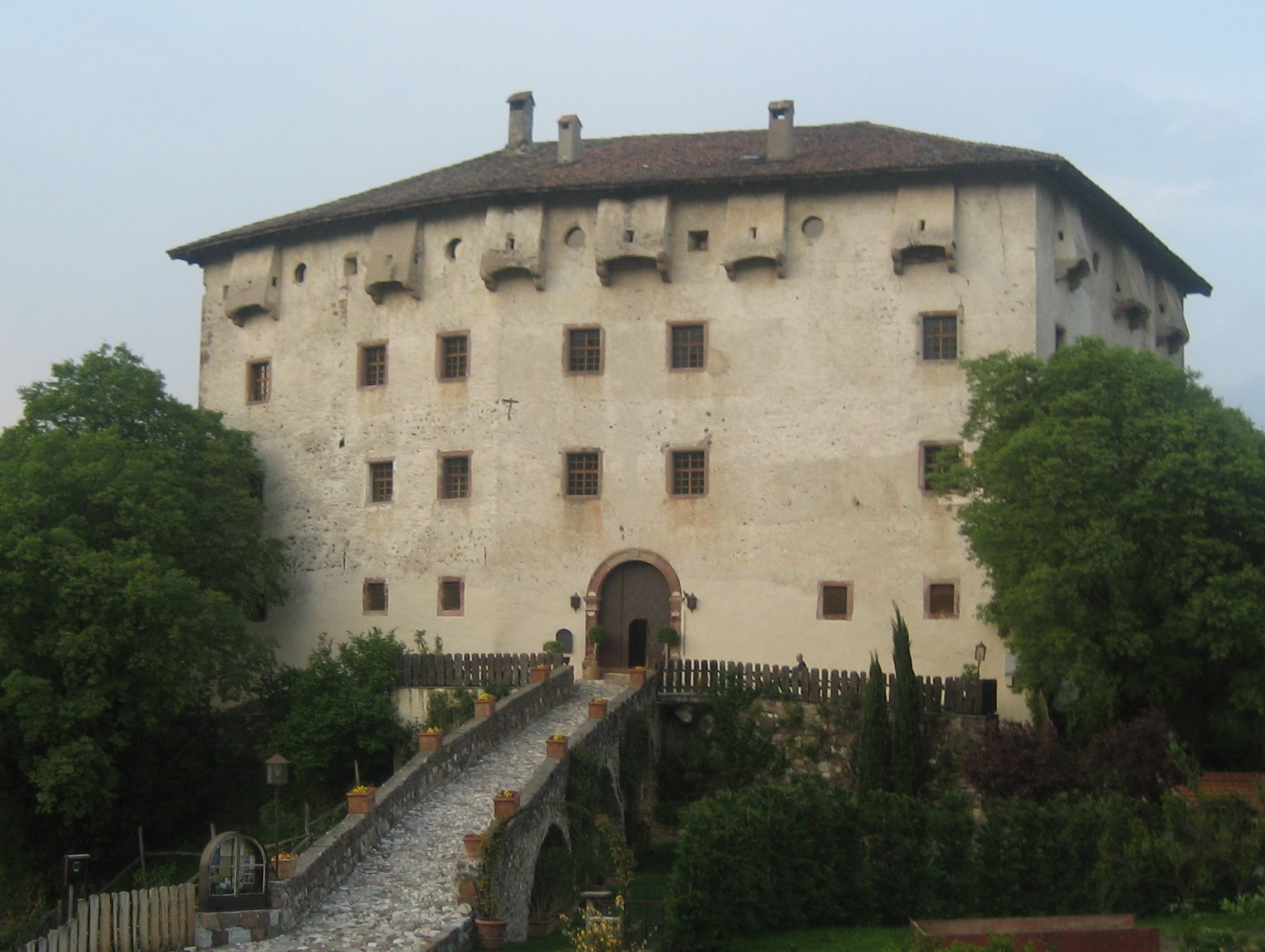
Katzenzungen Castle, home of the 350+ year old vine of Versoaln

According to legend, the Versoaln vine planted at Katzenzungen Castle was originally a cutting taken from a Versoaln vine planted at the palace of Versailles in the Île-de-France region of north-central France. The vine was reportedly brought to northeast Italy by a former owner of Katzenzungen Castle, Grafen Schlandesberg.

While ampelographer doubt the details of that origin story, today the Katzenzungen Versoaln vine is considered to be one of the oldest and largest vines in the world. Dated by Martin Worbes of the University of Göttingen in Germany to be at least 350 years old, the vine has been measured to cover a length of 350 square metres (3,800 ft^{2}). Among the few grapevines in the world that are older than the Katzenzungen vine is the 400+ year old Žametovka vine growing in the Slovenian town of Maribor.

The vine is maintained by viticulturists from the Laimburg Research Centre and has been used to propagate new Versoaln vines to keep the variety from being lost to extinction. Wine is still being made from the Katzenzungen vine with fruit harvested from the old vine added to the fruit taking from the newer plantings of Versoaln. Between the Katzenzungen vine and the newer plantings, around 500 bottles of Versoaln wine a year is produced in specially numbered bottles.

== Wine styles ==
According to Master of Wine Jancis Robinson, Versoaln tends to produce a dry wine with notable acidity levels and aromas green apples and apricot flavor notes.

== Synonyms ==
Over the years, Versoaln has been known under a variety of synonyms including: Versailler, Versoaler, Weiss Versoalen and Weisser Versailler.
