= Henri Bouschet =

French viticulturalist

Henri Bouschet was a French viticulturalist who specialized in crossing pigmented teinturière varieties of Vitis vinifera grapes - particularly with a view to sourcing colour (and tannin). Son of renowned viticulturalist, Louis-Marie Bouschet (1784–1876; creator of the Petit Bouschet), Henri also worked at Domaine de la Calmette, in Mauguio, Hérault, France, close to the university town of Montpellier. Henri Bouschet is best remembered for the still relatively unknown, but world-class Alicante Bouschet variety. Alicante was a local name in southern France given to the Grenache, with which the Petit Bouschet was crossed. Another of his creations is the Grand Noir de la Calmette.

== Works ==
- Collection de vignes à suc rouge obtenue par le semis après le croisement des cépages meridionaux avec le Teinturier by Henri Bouschet, 1865
- Trois nouveaux Muscats obtenus par la fécondation croisée et le semis, by Henri Bouschet, 1872
- Solution de la question du phylloxéra par les vignes américaines, by Henri Bouschet, 1875

== Bibliography ==
- Pierre Viala, Les Hybrides-Bouschet : essai d'une monographie des vignes à jus rouge, 1886
