= Teinturier grape =

Variety of grape

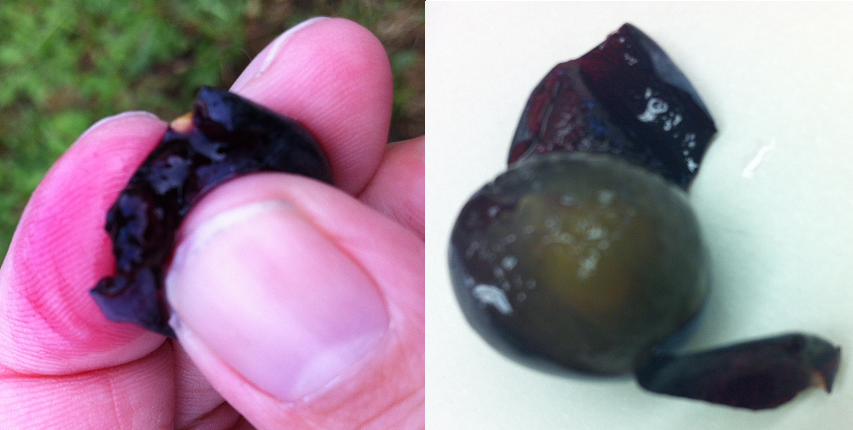
A demonstration of the difference between a red fleshed teinturier grape (Agria shown on the left) and a red wine grape variety (Grenache on the right) with its skin removed to show that both flesh and juice are naturally white. The vast majority of red wine grapes, like the Grenache, express white juice, with the red color of red wines coming from the grape's skin as part of the winemaking process.

Teinturier grapes (French pronunciation: [tɛ̃tyʁje]) are grapes whose flesh and juice are red in colour due to anthocyanin pigments accumulating within the pulp of the grape berry itself. In non-teinturier red grapes, anthocyanin pigments are confined to the outer skin tissue only, and the squeezed grape juice of most dark-skinned grape varieties is clear. The red color of red wine normally comes from anthocyanins extracted from the macerated (crushed) skins, over a period of days during the fermentation process. The name teinturier comes from French, meaning "dyer".

== Wines ==
Teinturier varieties, while containing a lot of color, usually make special wines, perhaps due to a higher level of tannins, compounds structurally related to the anthocyanins. Many winemakers blend small volumes of teinturier juices into their wines, to boost the colour, without dramatically impacting the taste. In addition, with the increased frequency of forest fires and the resulting risk of smoke taint in winemaking, tenteurier grapes are useful in making red wines even when the juice is pressed immediately without the skins. So a wine made in the rosé style from tenteurier grapes will be red rather than rosé and smoke-free (because smoke taint is present in the skins, not the pulp), regardless of how smoky the area is.

== Examples ==
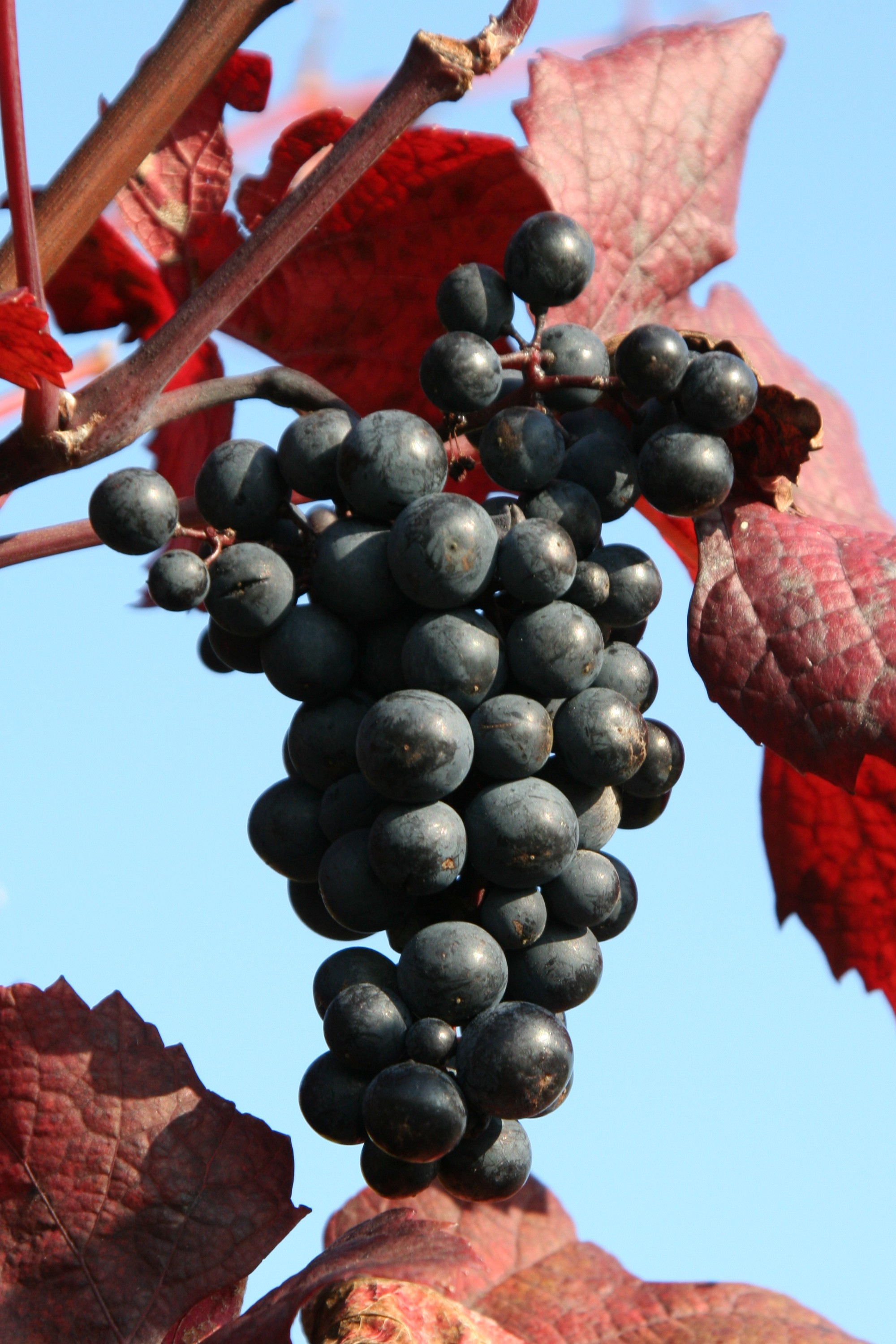
Grapes of the teinturier variety Kolor

- Alicante Bouschet
- Alicante Ganzin
- Black Spanish
- Carolina Black Rose
- Colorino
- Dunkelfelder
- Gamay de Bouze
- Golubok
- Grand Noir de la Calmette
- Karmrahyut
- Labelle (grape)
- Maréchal Foch
- Maroo Seedless
- Morrastel Bouschet
- Petit Bouschet
- Roger's Red
- Royalty
- Rubired
- Salvador
- Saperavi
