= Valdeorras (DO) =

Coordinates: 42°23′20″N 7°02′50″W

Valdeorras DOP
- Wine region
- Valdeorras DOP in the province of Ourense in the region of Galicia
- Type: Denominación de Origen Protegida (DOP)
- Year established: 1945
- Country: Spain
- Size of planted vineyards: 1,182 hectares (2,921 acres)
- No. of wineries: 42
- Wine produced: 35,787 hectolitres
- Comments: Data for 2016 / 2017

Valdeorras is a Spanish Denominación de Origen Protegida (DOP) (Denominación de Orixe Protexida in Galician) for Galician wines located on the banks of the river Sil in the south of the province of Ourense, (Galicia, Spain).

== History ==
Valdeorras, whose name means “Valley of the Gigurri”, may have been the first grape-growing and wine-producing region in Galicia. After the ancient Romans had finished mining the area for gold, they planted vines, and the wines produced were mentioned in several inscriptions in Latin.

During the Middle Ages the vineyards were taken over and managed by the religious orders. After a centuries-long period of decline, the 19th century saw the area take off again. In the 1970s experiments were conducted to reintroduce the native Godello grape variety.

The area acquired its official DO status in 1945.

== Geography ==
The vineyards of the Valdeorras DOP are on the banks of the river Sil, which flows westwards from Castile and León to the province of Ourense. In general the landscape is flat or gently rolling.

As most of the vineyards are on the river Sil valley floor, the soils are alluvial and quite fertile, with good moisture retaining properties.

The vines are planted at a height of between 240 m and 320 m above sea level.

== Climate ==
The climate in Valdeorras is a combination of Atlantic, continental and a specific micro-climate in the Sil valley. These factors ensure that the vines receive enough sunlight and heat during the short summer. Rainfall is high, between 850 mm and 1,000 mm per year. Temperatures can drop to below zero during the winter.

In addition to this, there are also risks of late frosts and hailstones in spring, excessive heat in summer, and violent storms caused by the mixture of the sea breezes and the dry air of the Castilian plain.

== Grapes ==
The Recommended white grapes are Godello, Loureira, Treixadura Albariño, Torrontés, Lado, and Dona Branca; also authorized is Palomino Fino.

The Recommended red grapes are Mencía, Tempranillo, Merenzao, Sousón, Brancellao, Caíño Tinto, Ferrón, and Espadeiro; also authorized are Gran Negro, Garnacha Tintorera (Alicante Bouschet), Mouratón.
