= Portalegre wine =

Portalegre is a Portuguese wine region centered on the Portalegre municipality in the Alentejo wine region. The region was initially an Indicação de Proveniencia Regulamentada (IPR) region, then elevated to Denominação de Origem Controlada (DOC) status. In 2003, it became one of eight subregions of the Alentejo DOC. Its name may still be indicated together with that of Alentejo, as Alentejo-Portalegre.

Located along the Spanish border, it is Alentejo northernmost subregion. The area is known for its powerful, spicy red wines and highly alcoholic white wines.

== Grapes ==
The principle grapes of the Portalegre region includes Aragonez, Arinto, Assario, Fernao Pires, Galego, Grand noir, Manteudo, Periquita, Roupeiro and Trincadeira, with Trincadeira being the leading grape variety.

== See also ==
- List of Portuguese wine regions
