= Salvador (grape) =

Variety of grape

Salvador is a red wine grape that is grown primarily in the Central Valley of California with some experimental plantings in Washington state.

The grape is normally used as a teinturier imparting some of its deep coloring to the blend. The grape's juice has a gelatin like texture and is difficult to extract from its small bunches.
