= Žametovka =

Variety of grape

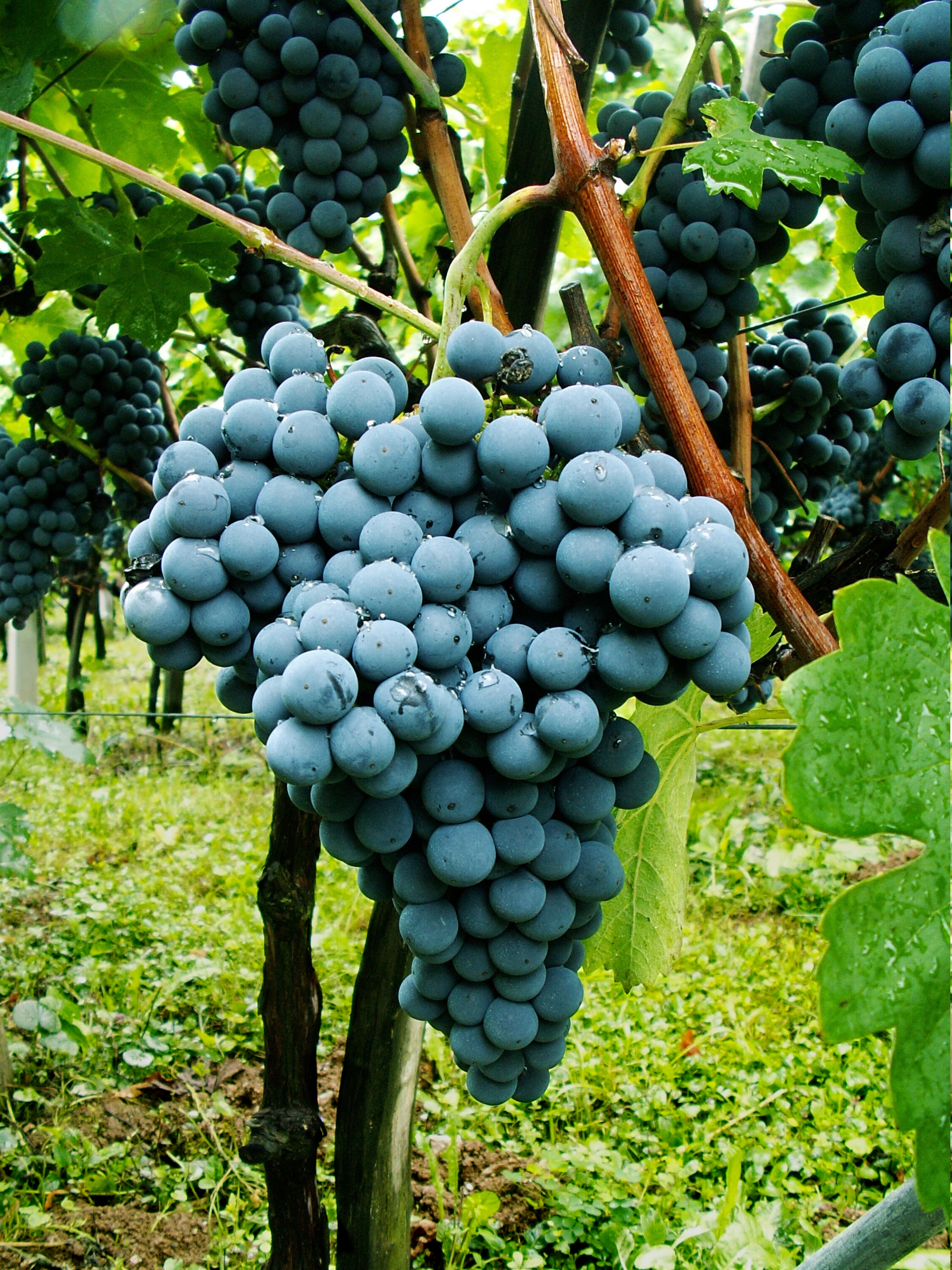
Žametovka grapes growing in a vineyard.

Žametovka (also known as Ametovka and Kavčina črna) is a red Slovenian wine grape variety. This is one of the oldest domesticated grape varieties in Slovenia. Formerly it was popular in Styrian vineyards, and even more so, even today, known in Dolenjska in southeast Slovenia - from the reddish wine cviček. It produces a wine of pure red color. A single vine of Žametovka growing in the Slovenian town of Maribor is estimated by the Guinness Book of Records to be the oldest living vine still producing fruit in the world at over 400 years of age.

== Maribor vine ==
The vine growing in Maribor is part of the frontage of Old Vine House (Hiša stare trte) located in the Lent neighborhood along the Drava river. Paintings of the house kept at the Štajerska Provincial Museum in Graz show the vine growing at least as early as 1657. In 1972, the vine was tested by a Paris laboratory with its age confirmed to be over 400 years. During its life, the Maribor vine survived the Ottoman–Habsburg wars that affected the entire region, Napoleon's invasion and rule of the Illyrian Provinces, the phylloxera epidemic that devastated Vitis vinifera vines across the continent as well as World War I and World War II.

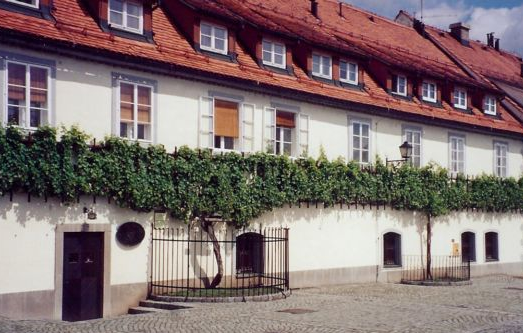
The more-than-400-year-old Žametovka vine growing outside the Old Vine House in Maribor, Slovenia. To the right of the vine is a daughter vine taken from a cutting of the old vine.

Each vintage the Maribor vine produces enough fruit to make around 25 liters of wine that gets bottled in small 250ml bottles and given by the city council of Maribor as ceremonial gifts to dignitaries with former United States president Bill Clinton being the recipient of one such bottle. Pope Benedict XVI, Emperor Akihito of Japan and former California governor Arnold Schwarzenegger have also received bottles of Žametovka wine produced from the Maribor vine.

Cuttings from the vine are also given as gifts with King Abdullah II of Jordan being the recipient of one cutting and former Slovenian President Milan Kučan having another cutting growing at his home in Ljubljana.

Harvesting of the vine and crushing of the grapes takes place in October as part of a 10-day Bacchanalia festival in Maribor.

== Wine ==
Žametovka is a late variety (ripens in middle of October), moderate vigor, requires a better vineyard location. It is relatively resistant to winter frost, but less against the spring frost. Since the beginning of budding to full maturity of the grapes takes about 170 days. The cluster is large, medium compact and weighs an average of 250-400 g. Žametovka grapes tend to ripen to high sugar levels and to produce rich wines with noticeable sweetness and residual sugars. The wine made from the Maribor vine, which is not available for public sale, has been described by The Daily Telegraph as "virtually undrinkable".

== Synonyms ==
Over the years Žametovka has been known under a variety of synonyms including Kavcina Crna, Kapcina Kavtchina, Koelner blau, Koelner Blauer, Zametasta Crnina, Zametna Crnina and Zametnina Crnina.

== See also ==
- Versoaln, white Italian grape with a 350+ year vine still used for wine production
