= Doña Blanca =

Variety of grape

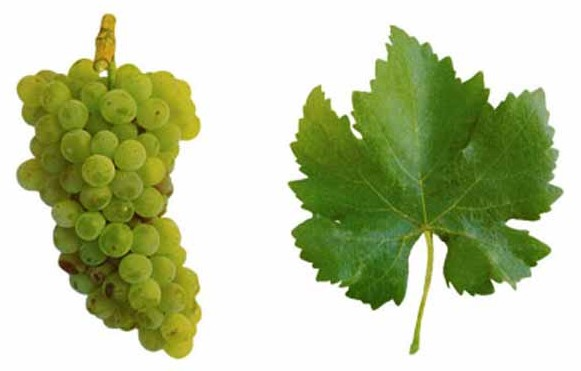

Doña Blanca (Spanish "White Lady", also known as Dona Branca in Portuguese) is a white Spanish and Portuguese grape variety that is grown primarily in the northwest Galicia region of Spain and throughout Portugal from the Douro northward. The variety is a permitted grape in the Spanish Denominación de Origens (DOs) of Valdeorras and Monterrei in Galicia and Bierzo in nearby Castile and León. In Spain, the variety is known as Doña Blanca (except in Valdeorras, where it is primarily known as Valenciana), while in Portugal it goes mainly by the name Dona Branca. The grapes have thick skins, which do well in the wet maritime climate, but it can also impart some astringency and slight bitterness even with the briefest of skin contact during production due to the high proportion of polyphenols in the skin.

== Synonyms ==
Various synonyms have been used to describe Doña Blanca and its wines including Alvaro de Soire, Alvaro de Sousa, Boal, Boal Cachudo, Colhao de Gallo, Dame Blanche, Dona Branca, Graciolo, Graciosa, Graziolo, Malvasia Branca, Malvasia Grosso, Moza Fresca, Santo Estevao, Valenciana, Voal Cachudo and Voal Esparrapado.
