= Morrastel Bouschet =

Variety of grape

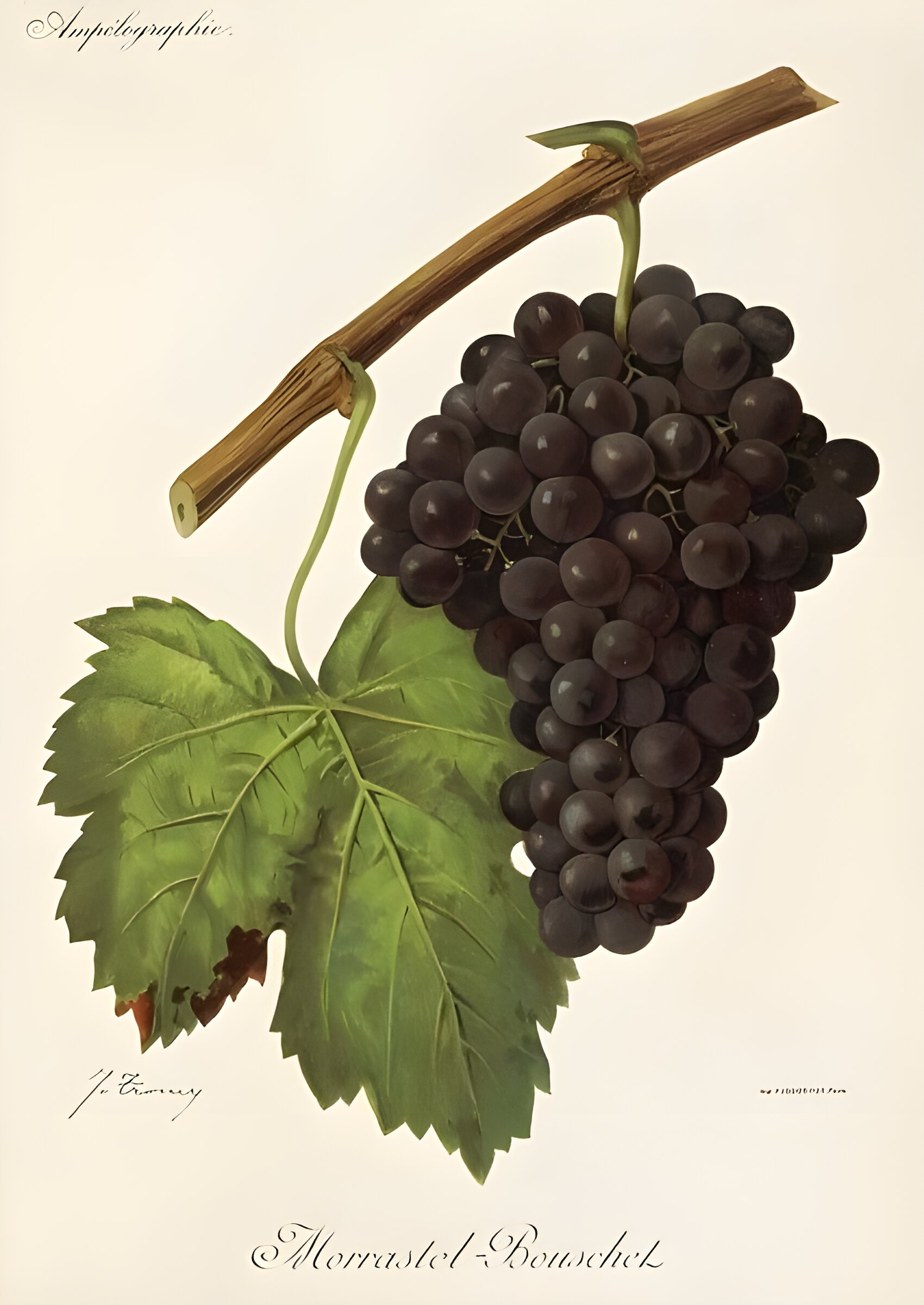
Morrastel Bouschet

Morrastel Bouschet is red French wine grape variety that is a crossing of the Spanish wine Vitis vinifera grape Graciano and the red-fleshed teinturier Bouschet Petit. The grape is often confused with its parent vine, Graciano, that is known as Morrastel in France and Uzbekistan, the Moristel grape from Aragon, as well as Mourvèdre which is known as Monastrell in Spain. Today Morrastel Bouschet is found mostly in the Aude and Hérault departments of southern France.

== Synonyms ==
Over the years Morrastel Bouschet has been known under a variety of synonyms including Bouschet, Gros Morrastel, Gros Morrastel Bouschet, Morrastel-bouschet à gros grains and Morrastel-bouschet à sarments étalés.
