= Harold Olmo =

American viticulturist and professor

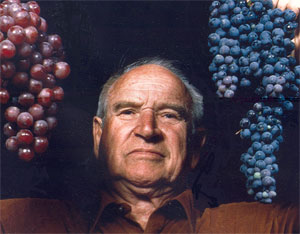
- Olmo in 1978
- Born: July 31, 1909
- Died: June 30, 2006 (aged 96)
- Occupations: Viticulturist; Professor at the University of California, Davis
- Known for: Olmo grapes

Harold Olmo (July 31, 1909 – June 30, 2006) was an American viticulturist and professor at the University of California, Davis where he created many new grape varieties known today as Olmo grapes. In the 1950s, he helped to establish California's first quarantine facility on the UC Davis campus to permit California growers to import foreign vines. This led to an expansion of California's wine industry as more Vitis vinifera was introduced to the area.

== Career ==
Harold Olmo studied horticulture at the University of California, Berkeley, where he earned his doctorate in plant genetics. His work with grapes started in 1931, during Prohibition.

He became an assistant professor of viticulture at UC Davis in 1938. In 1939, he set up a research plot in the Larkmead Vineyards. In 1948, he traveled a total of 12,000 miles in Iran, Iraq, Turkmenistan, Afghanistan and Pakistan to collect seeds and cuttings from the region. He brought them back to the USA, a collection that eventually became UC Davis' collection of genetically-diverse grapes. He also imported cuttings of the Greek varieties assyrtiko and moschofilero in the USA, which were stored at UC Davies until the Abbey of New Clairvaux started cultivating them in 2011.

In 1955, Olmo was in Western Australia studying climatic limitations of viticulture in the Swan Valley. Olmo spent eight months in Western Australia at the invitation of the Western Australian Vine Fruits Research Trust. When he published his report in 1956, one of the recommendations put forward was that Mount Barker and the Frankland of the Great Southern area of Western Australia showed great promise for making table wines in the light traditional European style.

Over the course of his nearly 50-year career, Olmo also developed more than 30 new grape varieties, including Ruby Cabernet, Carnelian, Rubired and Royalty.

He retired from UC Davis in 1977. He was also a consultant for the United Nations, a Fulbright scholar and a Guggenheim Fellow. He died in 2006, and had patented his last grape a few months before his death. The sum of his work and research is stored at UC Davis, under the file collection number D280, and was digitized for global access in 2020.

Since 2013, Larkmead Vineyards has been releasing the 'Larkmead Dr. Olmo', a 100% Cabernet Sauvignon cru born out of Harold Olmo's 1939 test crops planted on the Vineyards' property.

== See also ==
- California wine
- Margaret River (wine region)
