= Old vine =

Category of wine

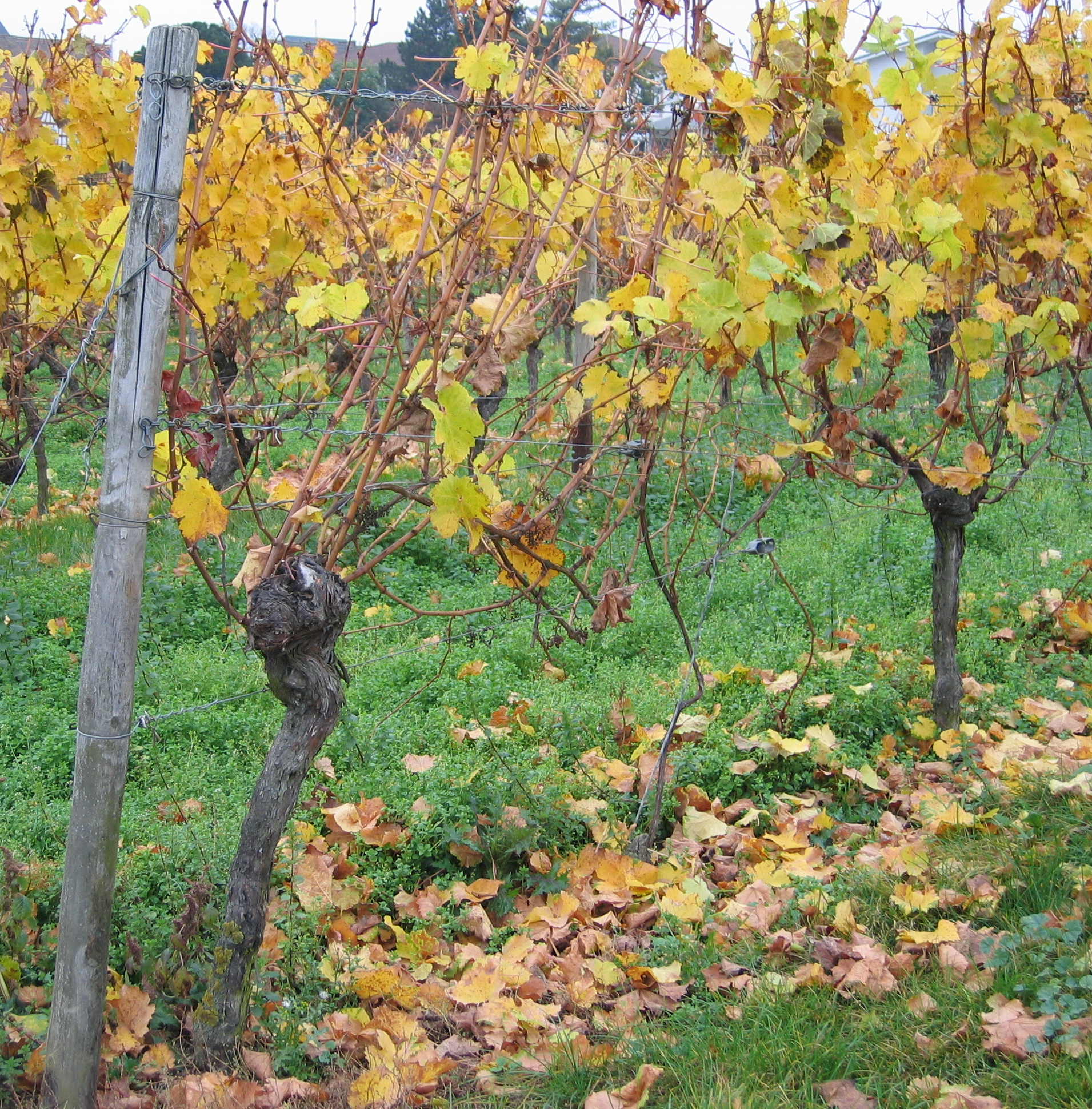
Left and right, two older Riesling vines flank a thin-stemmed young vine in the Kirchenstück vineyard, Hochheim, Rheingau, Germany, illustrating the effect of age on the look of a vine.

Old vine (French: vieilles vignes, German: alte Reben), a common description on wine labels, indicates that a wine is the product of grape vines that are notably old. There is a general belief that older vines, when properly handled, will give a better wine. There is no legal or generally agreed definition for old.

== Usage ==
Grape vines can grow for over 120 years. After about 20 years vines start to produce smaller crops, and average yields decrease; this leads to more concentrated, intense wines. Diseases such as "dead arm" can also afflict old vines; in some cases, this further concentrates the juice. "Old vines" might apply to an entire estate, or it might mean only a certain parcel planted before others. In the U.S., the most common use is on Zinfandel, because in California vineyards up to 125 years old are still bearing small amounts of prized Zinfandel fruit.

In a place where wine production is longstanding, it often means a wine whose vines are thirty to forty years old. Some wine makers insist the vines should be older than this. In newly established wine regions, twenty years might be old. The definition is further complicated by the fact that certain varieties simply do not have economically viable yields when they get truly ancient.

== Old vines around the globe ==
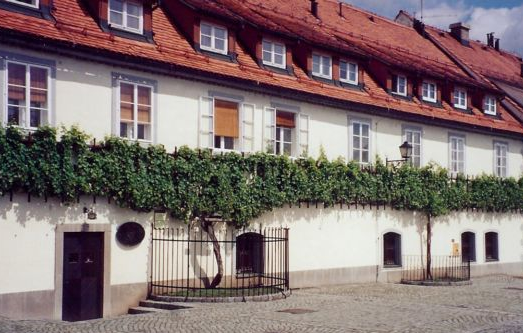
The more-than-400-year-old Žametovka vine growing outside the Old Vine House in Maribor, Slovenia. To the right of the vine is a daughter vine taken from a cutting of the old vine.

The oldest known grape-producing vine is a Žametovka vine growing in Maribor in Slovenia, which is known to have been alive in the 17th century; it produces only about 35 to 55 kilograms (77 to 121 lb) of grapes each year, which is fermented and put into about 100 miniature bottles.

In the South Tyrol wine region of northeast Italy, a more than 350-year-old vine of Versoaln planted at Castel Katzenzungen is being used to produce wine with the fruit of the old vine blended with the fruit of younger plantings to produce approximately 500 bottles a year.

The oldest vine with a fully authenticated minimum age, and thought to be the largest in the world, is known as the Great Vine at Hampton Court Palace in England. It was transplanted under the direction of Lancelot Capability Brown to its current site in 1768. The variety is ‘Schiava Grossa’ (also called Black Hamburg, or Trollinger). Contrary to the normal expectation for old vines, it produced its largest crop ever in autumn of 2001, of 383 kilograms (844 lb).

In the Barossa Valley of Australia, the world's oldest continually producing commercial vineyard that has been authenticated is believed to be the Shiraz vines at Turkey Flat in Tanunda that were originally planted in 1847. Block 42 at the Penfolds Kalimna Vineyard in the Barossa Valley contains Cabernet Sauvignon vines planted in 1888, believed to be the oldest Cabernet vineyard still producing wine. The Barossa Old Vine Charter was established to protect the older vines in the region and prevent them from being removed from the ground.

The oldest grapevine in America is the "Mother Vine" located on Roanoke Island. The vine is believed to be the progenitor of scuppernong grapes and was first recorded by colonists in 1584.

== Legal definition ==
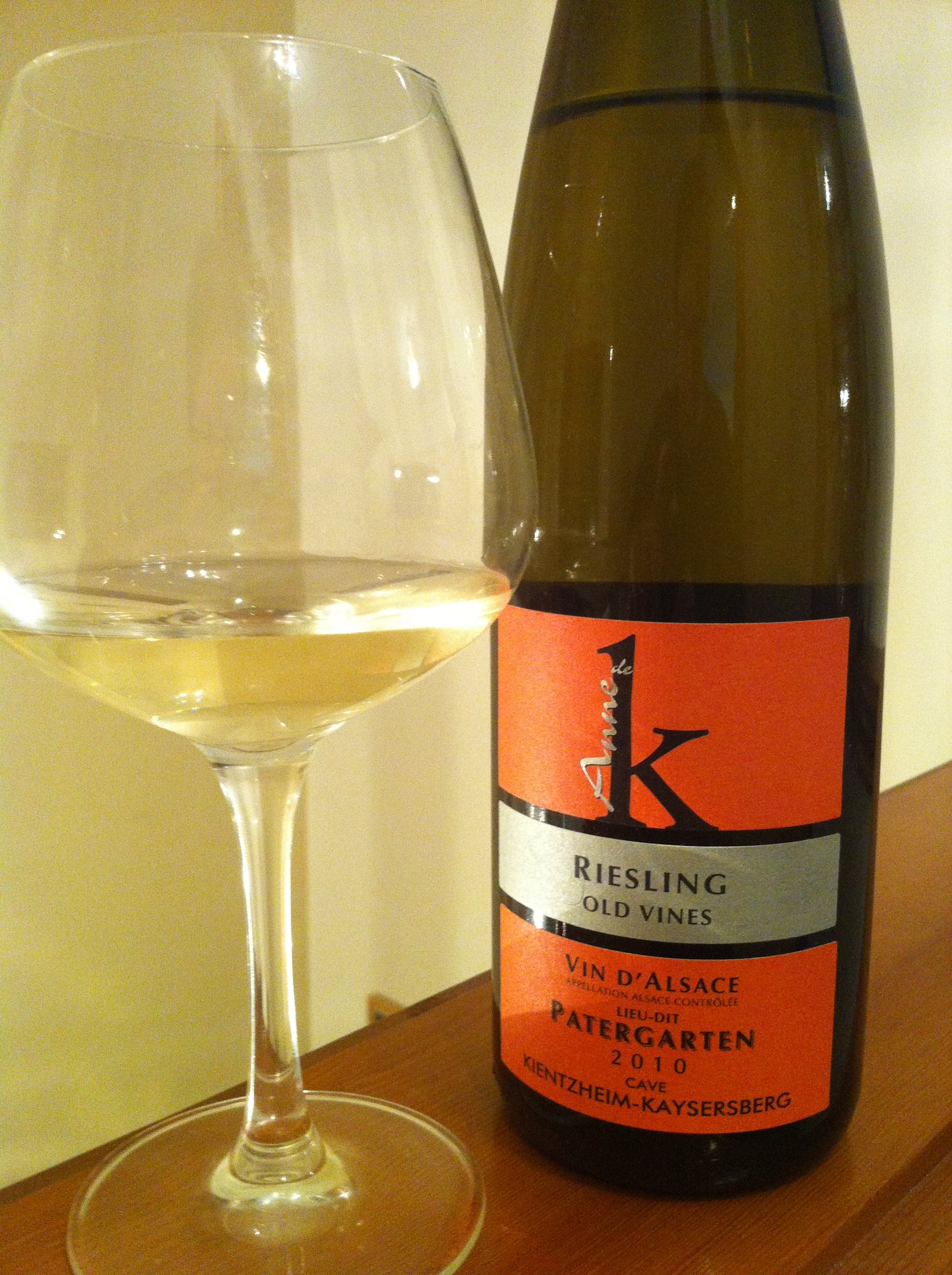
An Alsatian Riesling with the words "Old Vines" designated on the label.

Because there is no objective definition, an "old vines" wine might or might not show any specific characteristics related to vine age. Generally, the more reputable the producer, the more likely it is to have veracity. Similarly, if a producer sells a "regular" and "old vines" bottling, it is more likely to represent a perceptible difference in character, if not necessarily in quality. In these ways, "old vines" is similar to "reserve," a term that also varies dramatically in its significance and in many countries and regions has no legal definition.
