= Trousseau gris =

French wine

Trousseau Gris
- Grape (Vitis)
- Trousseau Gris ready to harvest September 2003, in the Fanucchi Wood Road Vineyard, in Sonoma County's Russian River Valley; California USA
- Species: Vitis vinifera
- Also called: Gray Riesling, Gris De Salces, Chauché Gris (more)
- Origin: France
- Notable regions: Jura, California
- VIVC number: 14165

Trousseau Gris is a French grape variety made into white wine. It is occasionally found in eastern France and was once widely grown in California under the name Gray Riesling. In cool climates it can produce fresh aromatic wines. It needs gentle handling and careful winemaking to bring out its best.

It is a white mutation of the red Trousseau grape.

== History ==
The 'gris' mutant is native to Jura in Eastern France.

== Distribution and wines ==
=== France ===
These days Trousseau Gris is mostly found in the Jura, Alsace, Lorraine and sometimes in the Champagne wine region.

=== United States ===
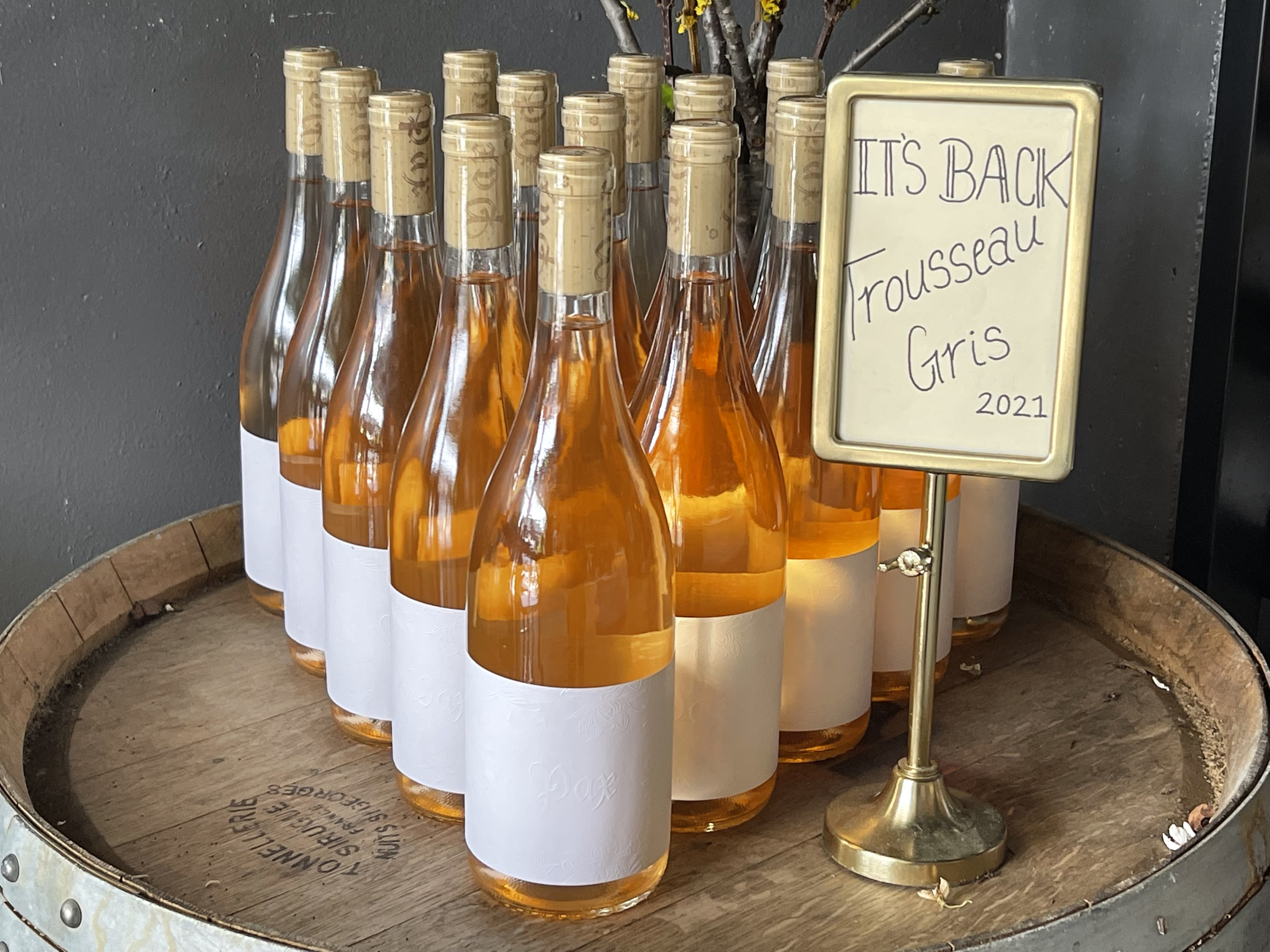
Trousseau gris bottles at Pax Wines in Sebastopol, California.

"Gray Riesling" was once widely planted in California, but declined sharply in the 1980s. Trousseau Gris can be found in a few old field-blended Zinfandel vineyards; the only standing block is ten acres of the Fanucchi Wood Road Vineyard in the Russian River Valley AVA.

In addition to making an aromatic still wine of its own, it has often been blended with Chardonnay, Viognier, White Zinfandel, and even some red wines. It has also been used in dessert wines, sparkling wines and fortified wines.

== Vine and viticulture ==
As a mutant of a port grape, Trousseau Gris can thrive in hot, dry conditions, producing much sweet fruit (as does any grape in hotter than optimal conditions). The best wines are made when it is grown in much cooler conditions, but only in the coolest parts of the coastal area of California especially the Russian River Valley or in the mountains of the Jura. It is a very meaty grape that doesn't like to release its juice and historically winemakers mistreated this grape with disastrous consequences but grown and handled properly, usually harvested around 23.5 brix, and gently pressed, Trousseau Gris has a crisp, clean, aromatic - flowery bouquet with flavors of fresh peaches, honeysuckle, pear, melon, delicate spice and tropical fruit.

== Synonyms ==
Baratszölö, Chauche Gris, Francia Szürke, Goundoulenc, Gray Riesling, Grey Riesling, Gris de Salces, Gris de Salses, Guindolenc, Guindoulenc, Hamu Szölö, Hamuszölö, Nagyvati, Sals, Sals Cenusiu, Salses Gris, Shome Seryi, Sose Serii, Terret D'Afrique

Trousseau Gris is also used as a synonym for Trousseau Noir.

== See also ==
- Grenache gris
- Pinot gris
- Aromatic wine
- Gewürtztraminer
