= Alicante Bouschet =

Variety of grape

- Grape (Vitis)
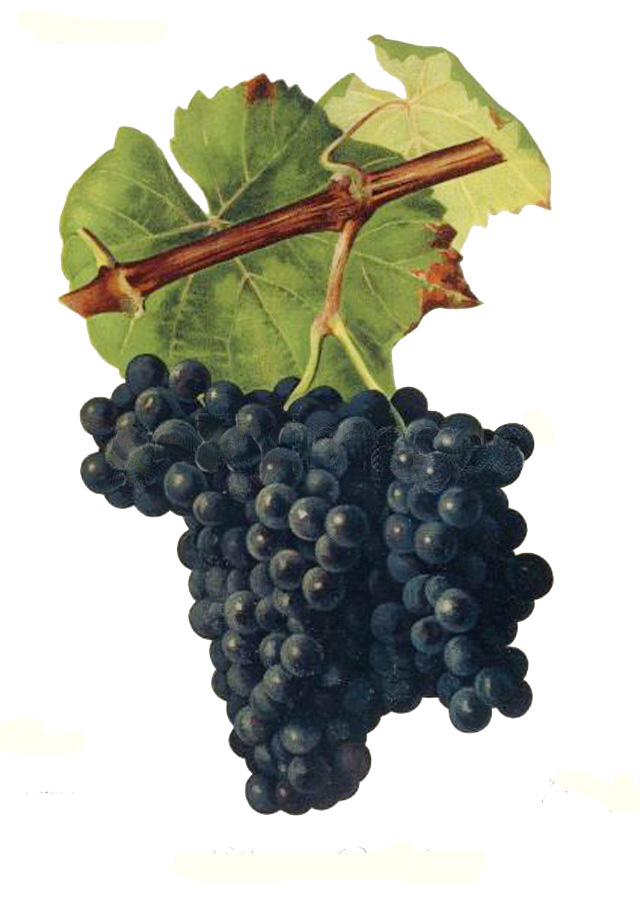
- Alicante Bouschet in Viala & Vermorel
- Color of berry skin: Noir
- Species: Vitis vinifera
- Also called: Alicante Henri Bouschet, Garnacha Tintorera
- Origin: Spain
- Original pedigree: Petit Bouschet × Grenache
- Pedigree parent 1: Petit Bouschet
- Pedigree parent 2: Grenache
- Notable regions: Alentejo, California
- Hazards: Downy mildew
- VIVC number: 304

Alicante Bouschet or Alicante Henri Bouschet is a wine grape variety that has been widely cultivated since 1866. It is a cross of Petit Bouschet (itself a cross of the very old variety Teinturier du Cher and Aramon) and Grenache. Alicante is a teinturier, a grape with red flesh. It is one of the few teinturier grapes that belong to the Vitis vinifera species. Its deep colour makes it useful for blending with light red wine. It was planted heavily during Prohibition in California for export to the East Coast. Its thick skin made it resistant to rot during the transportation process. The intense red color was also helpful for stretching the wine during prohibition, as it could be diluted without detracting from the appearance. At the turn of the 21st century, Alicante Bouschet was the 12th most planted red wine grape in France with sizable plantings in the Languedoc, Provence and Cognac regions. In 1958, Alicante Bouschet covered 24,168 hectares (mainly across southern France); by 2011, plantings represented less than 4,000 hectares. This scenario is largely reversed in other regions of Europe, and in southern Portugal, where its wines are highly prized and frequently outscore traditional autochthonous varieties.

== History and breeding ==
The grape was first cultivated in France in 1866 by Henri Bouschet as a cross of Petit Bouschet and Grenache. The Petit Bouschet grape was created by his father Louis Bouschet. The result was to produce a grape with deep color and of higher quality than the Teinturier du Cher. Several varieties of Alicante Bouschet were produced of varying quality. The grape's high yields and easy maintenance encouraged its popularity among French wine growers, especially in the years following the Phylloxera epidemic. By the end of the 19th century there were Alicante Bouschet plantings in Bordeaux, Burgundy, Loire Valley and Alentejo, Portugal

The grape was widely popular in the United States during the years of Prohibition. Grape growers in California's Central Valley found that its pulp was so fleshy and juicy that fermentable juice could be retrieved even after the third pressing. In contrast, wines made from grapes like Chardonnay and Merlot typically only include the juice from the free run (before pressing) and first or second pressing. The grape's thick skin also meant that it could survive the long railway transportation from California to New York City's Pennsylvania Station which had auction rooms where the grapes were sold.

The superior transportability of this variety was significant because of a ruling by the Internal Revenue Service on July 25, 1920, in connection with original wording in the Volstead Act, which allowed up to 200 gallons of home-made wine per year, per household, for consumption in the home only. In 1928, one single auction lot of 225 carloads of grapes were purchased by a single buyer. The amount of grapes was enough to make more than 2,000,000 US gallons (7,600,000 L) of wine.

== Wine regions ==
In Portugal's Alentejo region, Alicante Bouschet is often made into a varietal wine.

In France, the grape was historically a blending partner with Aramon but in recent times has been made more into its own varietal. However, planting of new vines has steadily declined. In some areas of France the grape is now extinct. According to international wine guru and Master of Wine, Jancis Robinson, Alicante Bouschet is thought to have found its true home in Portugal's Alentejo where it was first planted at Herdade do Mouchão in the late 1800s. Widely planted across the Alentejo wine region today (having grown exponentially in popularity from the late 1990s) it is frequently expensive, surpassing the quality and personality of other noble varieties. These top-end wines are prized for their 'size', dense colour and phenolic content. In Chile the grape is blended with Cabernet Sauvignon and to make concentrated varietal wines. In California the grape was popular among home winemakers during Prohibition and still grown today in Napa, Sonoma, Madera, and Calaveras counties. Other areas with notable Alicante Bouschet plantings include Algeria, Palestine and parts of central and southern Italy.

In Spain Alicante Bouschet is called garnacha tintorera or negral and it is the fifth most planted red grape variety in with 22,572 ha (55,776 acres) grown in 2015.

== Viticulture and wine ==
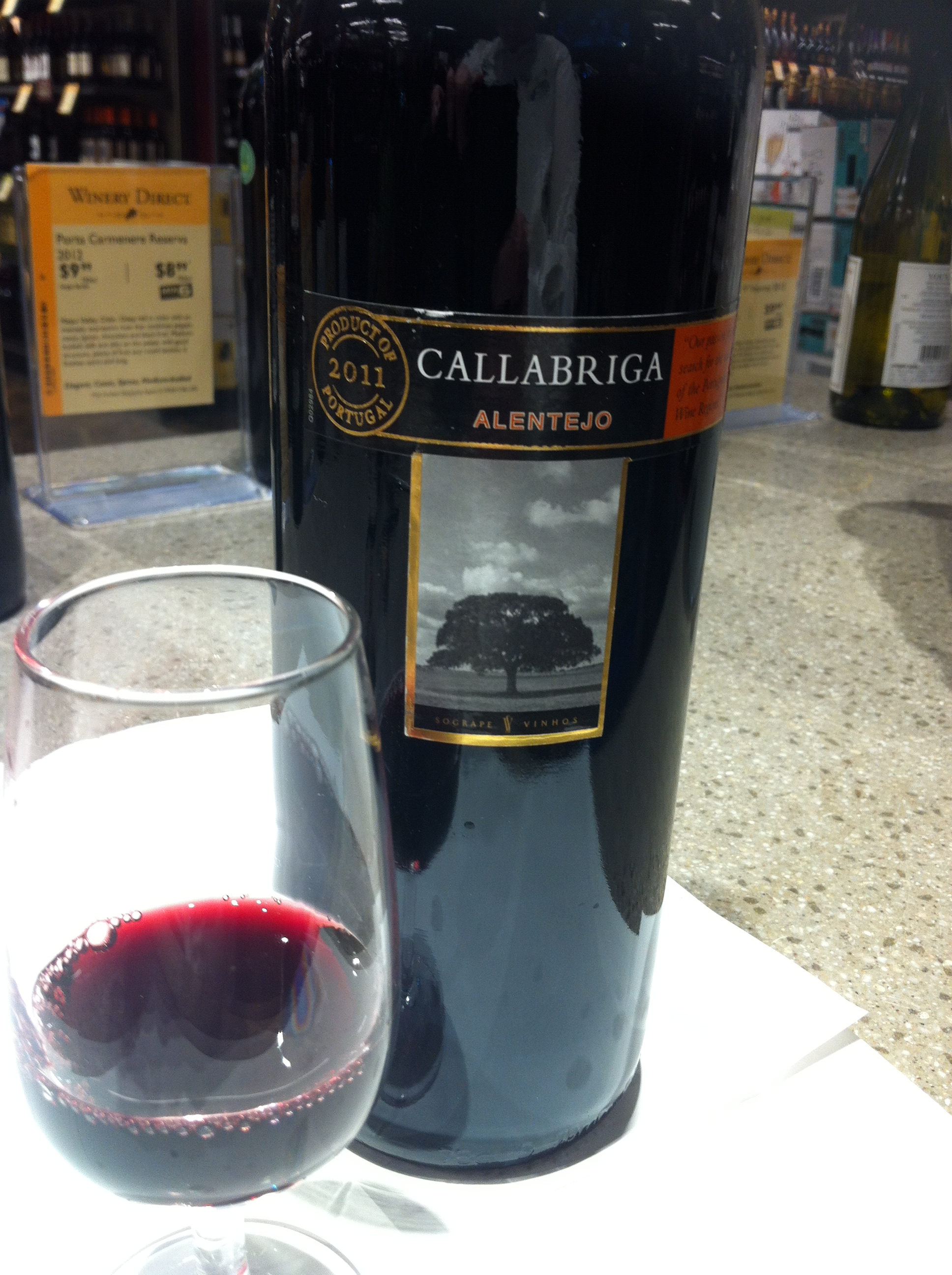
A red wine from the Alentejo that is a blend of several Portuguese grape varieties including Aragonez (Tinta Roriz/Tempranillo), Alicante Bouschet and Alfrocheiro.

Recognized by many today as a noble red variety (particularly in southern Iberia), Alicante Bouschet is known for its deep dark color, more than 15 times the color of Aramon and twice the darkness of the Grand Noir de la Calmette. Under specific conditions, the grape can produce high yields of up to 80 hl/ha. It buds and ripens early-to-mid season to produce wines high in alcohol, particularly where jamminess is valued and extended 'hang-time' is practiced. The wines tend to be short on primary aromas and can lack character and complexity when young. Alicante Bouschet performs best under specific conditions and where tertiary aromas are allowed to predominate through ageing. The grape vine is thought to be prone to grape diseases like anthracnose, downy mildew and occasionally bunch rots in rare instances where bunches are tight at harvest. Alicante Bouschet leaves turn a beautiful purple hue in late autumn.

== Synonyms ==
Alicante Bouschet is also known under the synonyms Alicant de Pays, Alicante, Alicante Bouchet, Alicante Bouschet 2, Alicante Extra Fertile, Alicante Femminello, Alicante H. Boushet, Alicante Henri Bouschet, Alicante Nero, Alicante Noir, Alicante Tinto, Alicantina, Alikant Buse, Alikant Buse Bojadiser, Alikant Bushe, Alikant Bushe Ekstrafertil, Alikant Bushe Nr. 2, Alikant Genri Bushe, Alikante Henri Bouschet, Aragonais, Aragones, Arrenaou, Baga, Bakir Uezuemue, Barvarica, Blasco, Bojadiserka, Carignan Jaune, Cupper Grape, Dalmatinka, Garnacha, Garnacha Tintorera, Lhadoner, Kambuša, Moraton, Mouraton, Murviedro, Negral, Pe de Perdiz, Pe de Pombo, Petit Bouschet, Redondal, Rivesaltes, Rivos Altos, Roussillon, Rouvaillard, Sumo Tinto, Tinta Fina, Tinta Francesa, Tinto, Tinto Nero, Tinto Velasco, Tintorera, Tintorera de Liria, Tintorera de Longares, Tinturao, and Uva di Spagna.

== Crosses ==
Alibernet — crossing of Alicante Bouschet x Cabernet Sauvignon was bred in 1950 in the Ukrainian Scientific Research Institute for Wine and Vines in Odessa. It is planted in Slovakia, Hungary and the Czech Republic.

Lusitano — Alicante Bouschet is thought to be a parent of this rare Portuguese grape having been crossed with Castelão (a.k.a. Periquita)

"Roger's Red" — Prized for its scarlet-crimson fall leaf color, this naturally occurring hybrid of Vitis californica and Vitis vinifera, "Alicante Bouschet" was discovered in Sonoma County, California, in 1983 by Roger Raiche. It is widely propagated and sold in nurseries. Genetic testing at the University of California, Davis, confirmed its hybrid status, not a natural variant of the native California grape.

== See also ==
- List of Portuguese grape varieties
