= List of Port wine grapes =

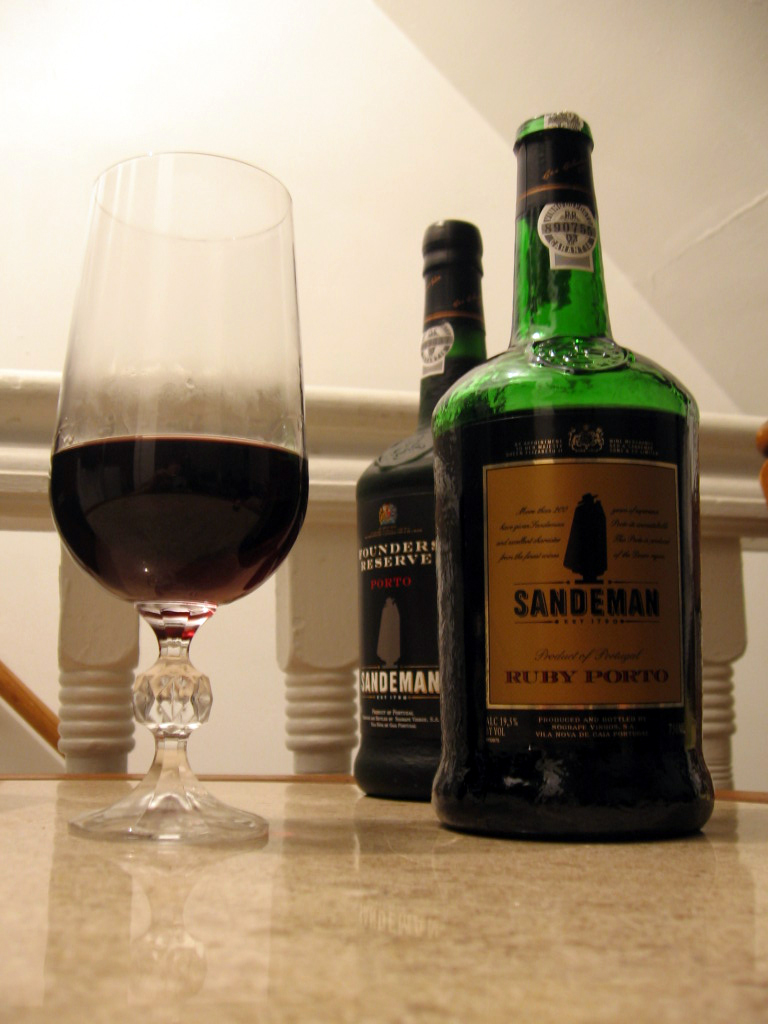
Port wine

According to the Method of Punctuation of the Plots of Land of Vineyards of the Region of Douro (decree nº 413/2001), there were 30 recommended and 82 permitted grape varieties in Port wine production. The quality and characteristics of each grape varies with the classification of grape varieties making a distinction between "Very Good", "Good", "Average", "Mediocre" and "Bad" quality grapes. But this classification is actually in revaluation based on the technical and scientific data of the CEVD (Center of Wine Studies of Douro). The six most widely used grapes for red Port wine are Touriga Franca, Tinta Roriz, Tinta Barroca, Touriga Nacional, Tinta Cão and Tinta Amarela.

== Black grapes ==
Recommended Grape Varieties

=== Very good ===
- Bastardo
- Donzelinho tinto
- Marufo
- Tinta Francisca
- Tinta Roriz
- Tinta Cão
- Touriga Franca
- Touriga Nacional

=== Good ===
- Castelão
- Cornifesto
- Malvasia Preta
- Mourisco de Semente
- Rufete
- Tinta Amarela
- Tinta Barroca

Permitted Grape Varieties

=== Good ===
- Mourisco de Semente
- Sezão
- Tinta Bastardinha
- Tinta Carvalha
- Touriga Fémea

=== Average ===
- Avarelhão
- Baga
- Casculho
- Castelã
- Cidadelhe
- Concieira
- Engomada
- Jaen
- Lourela
- Melra
- Moreto
- Pinot noir
- Tinta Tabuaço
- Tinta Penajóia
- Tinto Martins
- Tinto sem Nome

=== Mediocre ===
- Alicante Bouschet
- Alvarelhão Ceitão
- Espadeiro
- Petit Bouschet
- Tinta Aguiar
- Tinta Mesquita
- Tinta Pereira
- Tinta Pomar
- Roseira
- Varejoa

=== Bad ===
- Aramon
- Carignan
- Carrega tinto
- Gonçalo Pires
- Grand noir
- Grangeal
- Malandra
- Mondet
- Nevoeira
- Patorra
- Português Azul
- Preto Martinho
- Santareno
- São Saul
- Sevilhão
- Tinta Lameira
- Tinta Fontes
- Valdosa

== White grapes ==
Recommended Grape Varieties

=== Very good ===
- Donzelinho branco
- Sercial
- Folgasão
- Gouveio branco
- Bancho Grundel Taint
- Malvasia Fina
- Rabigato branco
- Viosinho
- Verdelho

=== Good ===
- Arinto
- Cercial
- Moscatel Galego branco
- Samarrinho
- Síria
- Vital

Permitted Grape Varieties

=== Very Good ===
- Bical
- Gouveio Estimado

=== Good ===
- Códega do Larinho
- Gouveio Real

=== Average ===
- Avesso
- Barreto
- Branco sem Nome
- Estreito Macio
- Fernão Pires
- Malvasia Parda
- Pé Comprido
- Pinheira branca
- Praça
- Rabigato Moreno
- Ratinho
- Verdial branco

=== Mediocre ===
- Alvarelhão branco
- Batoca
- Branco Especial
- Chasselas
- Malvasia Rei
- Mourisco branco
- Touriga branca

=== Bad ===
- Caramela
- Carrega branco
- Dona branca
- Diagalves
- Jampal
- Moscadet
- Rabo de Ovelha
- Sarigo
- Tamarez
- Valente

== See also ==
- List of Portuguese wine grape varieties
