= Lisboa VR =

Coordinates: 38.7150166°N 9.4477633°W

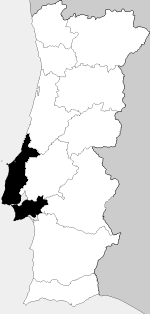
Lisboa-top left highlighted with the península de Setúbal. Viticulturally these regions are considered separate.

Lisboa, until 2009 named Estremadura, is a Portuguese wine region covering the same areas as the Estremadura region, and taking its name from the country's capital. The region is classified as a Vinho Regional (VR), a designation similar to a French vin de pays region. While the Beiras and Alentejo VRs are largest geographically, the Lisboa region is Portugal's largest producer of wine by volume. The region stretches from Lisbon along the Atlantic coast to the Bairrada DOC.

In early 2009, the region was renamed from Estremadura to Lisboa to avoid confusion with the Spanish wine region Extremadura and to capitalize on the internationally well-known name of the country's capital.

== Wine regions ==
Within the Lisboa region there are 9 subregions at the DOC level.

- Alenquer DOC
- Arruda DOC
- Bucelas DOC
- Carcavelos DOC
- Colares DOC
- Óbidos DOC
- Torres Vedras DOC
- Encostas d'Aire DOC-Overlaps into the Beiras VR
- Lourinhã DOC

== Grapes ==
The principle grapes of the Lisboa region includes Alfrocheiro Preto, Antão Vaz, Arinto, Baga, Bastardo, Borrado das Moscas, Cabernet Sauvignon, Camarate, Chardonnay, Sercial, Fernão Pires, Graciano, Jampal, Malvasia, Moreto, Periquita, Rabo de Ovelha, Ramisco, Tamarez, Tinta Amarela, Trincadeira das Pratas, Ugni blanc and Vital.

== See also ==
- List of Portuguese wine regions
