= Carcavelos DOC =

Portuguese wine region

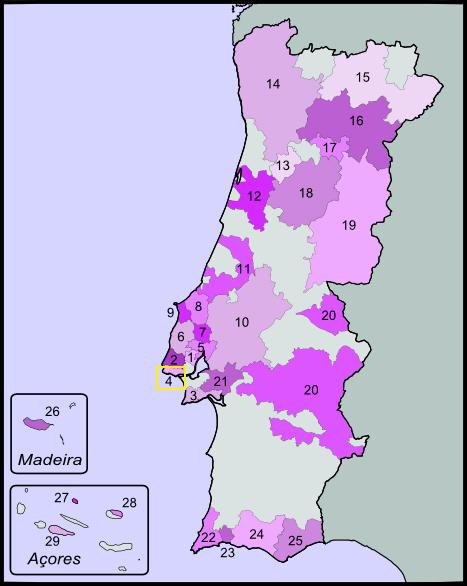
Wine regions of Portugal. Carcavelos is highlighted as region #4

Carcavelos is a Portuguese wine region centered on the Carcavelos municipality in Estremadura region and includes land near the cities of Cascais and Oeiras. The region has Portugal's highest wine classification as a Denominação de Origem Controlada (DOC). Located at the very southern tip of the Estremadura region, the region has a long winemaking history dating back to the 18th century when Sebastião José de Carvalho e Melo, Marquis of Pombal owned vineyards here. The region is known for its fortified wine production, creating off dry, topaz colored wines that have nutty aromas and flavors. While once a thriving wine region, world-renowned in the 19th century for its tawny colored fortified wine, in the modern era Carcavelos has been devastated by real estate development in the suburbs of the capital city of Lisbon and nearby coastal city of Estoril.

== History ==
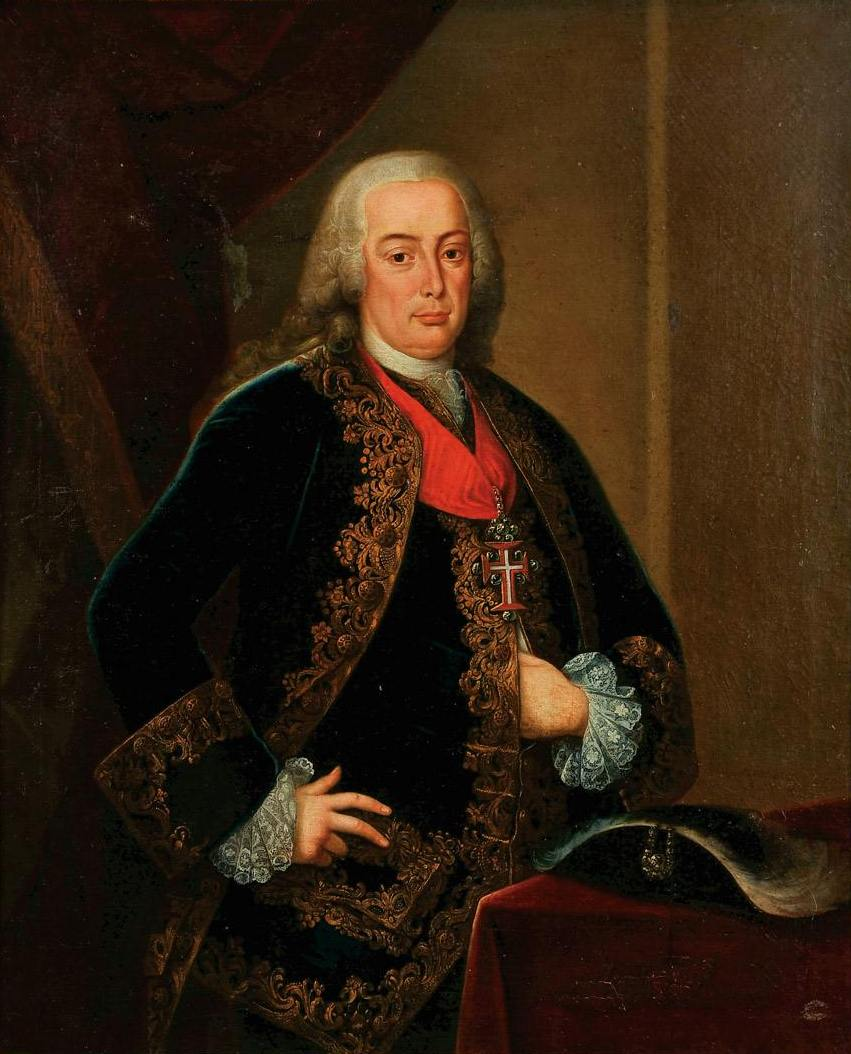
Despite establishing the mandate that Port wine should only come from the Douro, the Marquis of Pombal allowed grapes grown from his own estate in Carcavelos to be used by Port producers

While viticulture has likely existed in this region since Roman times, it was not until the Marquis of Pombal established the region as a winemaking center in the 18th century that Carcavelos came to be associated with wine. Pombal's actions were perhaps self-serving since he owned extensive vineyard on his estate in Oeiras. Prior to this, Pombal would sell his grapes to Port wine producers in the Douro, in violation of his own 1756 regulations establishing the Companhia Geral da Agricultura das Vinhas do Alto Douro (General Company of Viticulture of the Upper Douro or C.G.A.V.A.D.) which aimed to guarantee the authenticity of Port by mandating that it be made completely from Douro grapes.

Pombal's estate eventually built a reputation for Carcavelos of fortified wine production. In the early 19th century, the wines were very popular with the British market in London, particularly at the auction houses. In 1908, the region was officially demarcated as Região Demarcada (an early precursor to the Denominação de Origem Controlada appellation system). However the 20th century has seen a rapid decline in viticulture in the region because of the urban sprawl expansion of the capital city of Lisbon and the nearby city of Estoril. By the turn of the 21st century only 25 acres (10 hectares) of vines remain, consisting mostly of what is left of Pombal's estate and two independent vineyards. In a fate similar to the other principal regions of the Lisboa VR-the Colares DOC and Bucelas DOC-there has been some spark of interest on the part of small independent winemakers to revive the historic legacy and indigenous grapes of the region so Carcavelos' fortunes may change in the future.

== Climate and geography ==
Typical of the Estremadura, Carcavelos has a Mediterranean climate that is moderated by its close proximity to the mouth of the Tagus river.

== Grapes and winemaking ==
Carcavelos can be a blend of up to nine different grapes. The principal grapes of the Carcavelos region includes Arinto, Boal, Galego Dourado, Negra Mole, Trincadeira and Torneiro. The wines are usually fermented completely dry with some fermenting must known as the vinho abafado containing some residual sugar set aside prior to the fermentation's completion. The wine is fortified with a distilled grape spirit to bring the wine up to an alcohol level of 18-20% and the vinho abafado is added back in to add sweetness to the wine. Carcavelos wines are then aged in oak barrels for three to five years to give the wines a tawny color and nutty flavor.

== See also ==
- List of Portuguese wine regions
