= Alcobaça wine =

Portuguese wine region

Coordinates: 39.550°N 8.973°W

Alcobaça is a Portuguese wine region centered on the town of Alcobaça in the Estremadura region. The region was initially an Indicação de Proveniencia Regulamentada (IPR) region, but in 2005 it became one of two subregions of the Encostas d'Aire DOC, which has Denominação de Origem Controlada (DOC) status. Its name may still be indicated together with that of Encostas d'Aire, as Encostas d'Aire-Alcobaça.

The region produces predominantly white wines with lower alcohol levels then it neighboring wine regions on in Estremadura.

== Grapes ==
The principal grapes of the Alcobaça region include Arinto, Baga, Fernão Pires, Malvasia, Periquita, Tamarez, Tinta Amarela and Vital.

== See also ==
- List of Portuguese wine regions
