= Povolide =

Povolide is a parish in the Viseu municipality, in Portugal.

Povolide may also refer to:

- a synonym for the Portuguese Baga grape variety
