= Óbidos =

Óbidos may refer to:

- Óbidos, Brazil, a town in the State of Pará
- Óbidos, Portugal, a municipality in the Oeste region of Portugal
  - Óbidos DOC, a wine produced there
- Obidos (software)
