= Torres Vedras DOC =

Torres Vedras is a Portuguese wine region centered on the town of Torres Vedras in the Lisboa wine region. The region is designated as Denominação de Origem Controlada (DOC) after it was promoted from its former Indicação de Proveniência Regulamentada (IPR) status. The high yields produced in this region have historically been used by bulk wine producers for inexpensive vindo de mesa wines. The area was known by the shorthand "Torres" until Spanish wine producer Miguel A. Torres objected to the association with the region.

== Grapes ==
The principle grapes of the Torres Vedras region include Arinto, Camarate, Fernão Pires, Graciano, Jampal, Mortágua, Periquita, Rabo de Ovelha, Seara Nova and Vital.

== See also ==
- List of Portuguese wine regions
