= Donzelinho branco =

Variety of grape

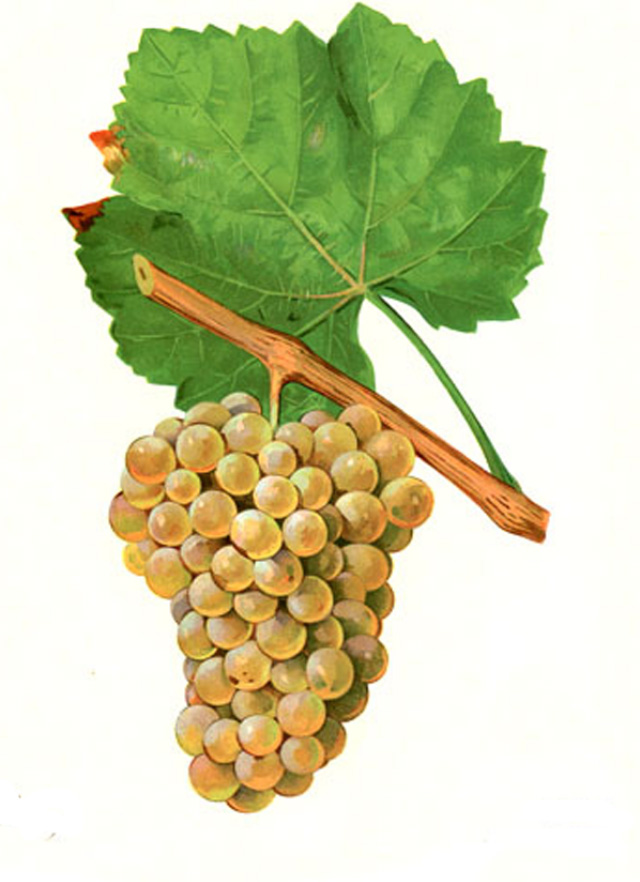
Image of Donzellinho branco

Donzelinho branco is a white Portuguese wine grape variety that is classified as one of the "Very Good" varieties authorized to be used in Port wine production. While rarely seen as a varietal wine, Donzelinho branco is a permitted variety in the white blends of several northern Portuguese wine regions including the Denominação de Origem Controlada (DOC) of Douro and Trás-os-Montes and the Vinho Regional (VR) wines of Duriense and Transmontano.

== History and relationship to other grapes ==
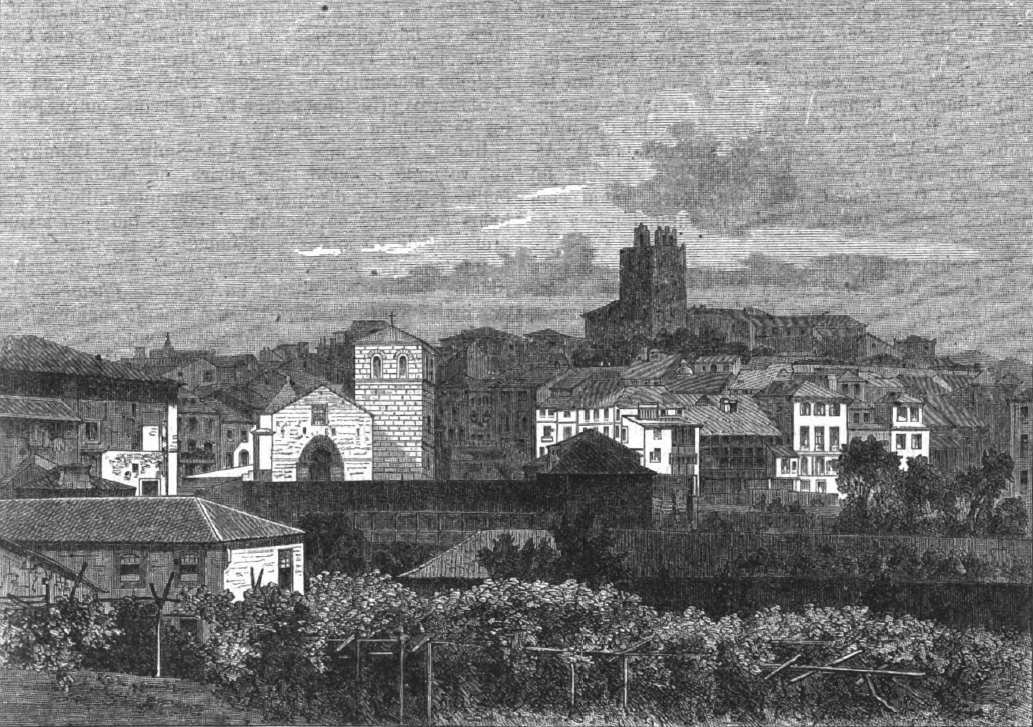
An 1868 drawing of vines growing in front of the commune of Lamego where Donzelinho branco has a history of being grown.

Donzelinho branco has a long history of use in Portuguese wine production, being first mentioned in the 16th century under the synonym Donzelyhno by Portuguese wine writer Rui Fernandes who noted that the grape was one of the varieties being grown around what is now the Lamego Municipality in 1531–1532.

In 2010, DNA analysis showed that, unlike Pinot blanc and Pinot noir, neither Donzelinho branco nor Donzelinho tinto were color mutations of one or the other. DNA profiling also demonstrated that despite sharing several synonyms that Donzelinho branco has no close genetic relationship to the Portuguese wine grapes Rabigato, Terrantez and Folgasão.

== Viticulture ==
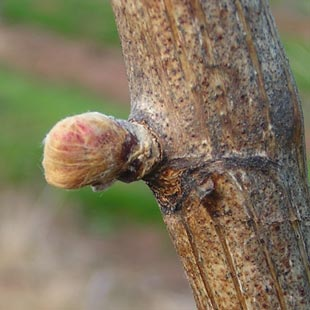
Donzelinho branco's tendency to bud early in the growing seasons leaves the vine susceptible to early spring time frost.

Despite having very small and compact clusters, the thick skin of the Donzelinho branco berries gives the grape good resistance to most mildew and fungal problems but the vine is still susceptible to the viticultural hazards of frost due to it budding early in the growing season. Donzelinho branco is a mid-ripening variety that has a natural tendency towards low yields due to the vine's poor fertility. This means that growers will often "long prune", leaving additional buds on the fruiting cane to compensate for the low crop load.

== Wine regions ==
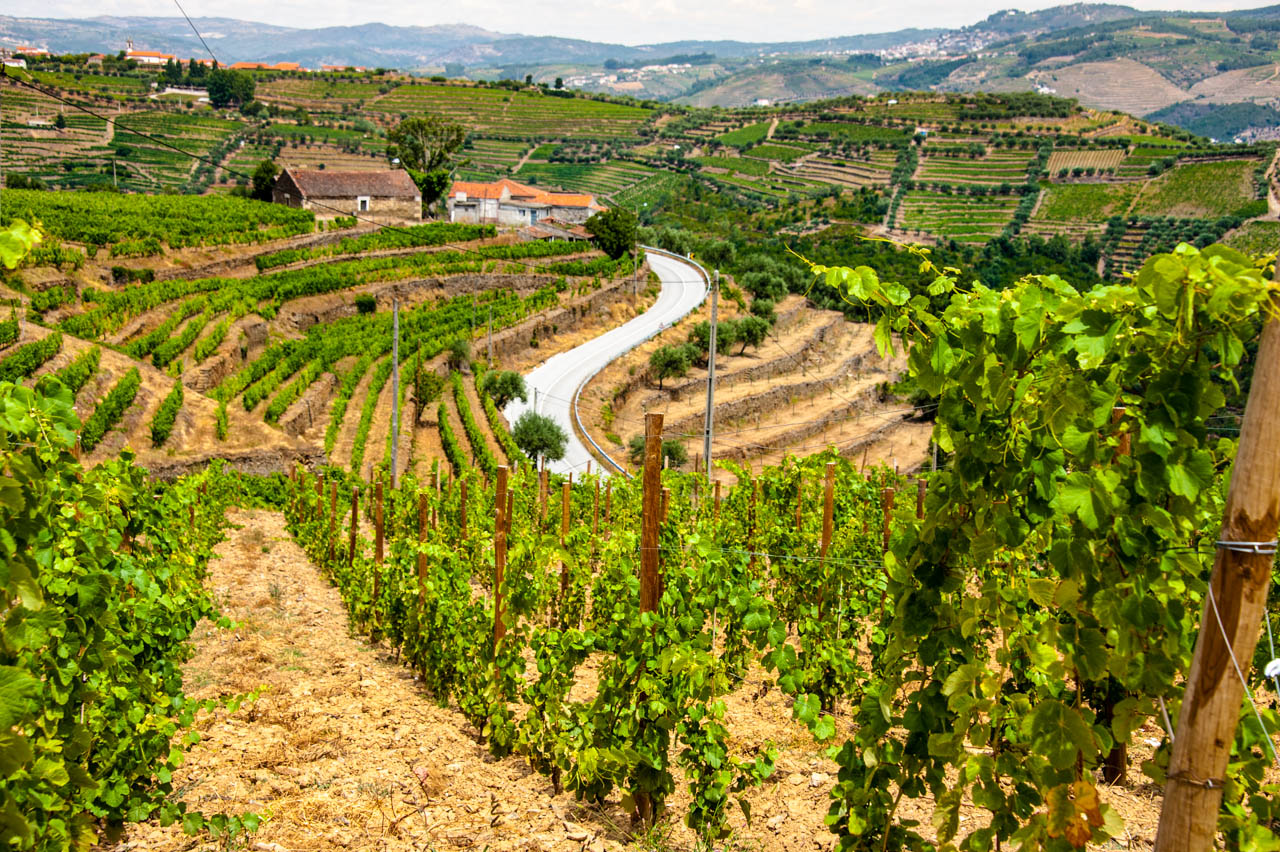
Donzelinho branco is planted in the Douro region where it can be used in several wines, particularly the Vinho Regional wines of the Duriense.

The vast majority of Donzelinho branco plantings can be found in the northern wine regions of Portugal, particularly in the Douro where the grape is authorized for use as a blending variety in Port wine and in the Trás-os-Montes region which includes both the DOC of the same name and the large encompassing Vinho Regional zone of Transmontano. Additionally the Duriense VR, which encompasses the Douro, also list Donzelinho branco as an authorized variety.

As with many Portuguese grape varieties, plantings of Donzelinho branco were often interspersed with numerous other grape varieties in the vineyard and used in general field blends. This makes getting an accurate count of plantings difficult and also means that the grape is less likely to be seen as a varietal wine. In the 2010 census of Portuguese grapes, there were 42 hectares (100 acres) of Donzelinho branco planted, a decline from 15 years earlier.

== Styles ==
According to Master of Wine Jancis Robinson, Donzelinho branco tends to make highly perfumed, light-bodied wines with a characteristic lavender note. The grape is rarely seen as a varietal wine and more often a component of field blends with several other grape varieties.

== Synonyms ==
Over the years, Donzelinho branco has been known under a variety of synonyms including: Donzellinho branco, Donzelyhno, Terrantes and Terrantez.
