= Catarina Filipe =

- Born: Catarina Sofia Santos Filipe; February 12, 1995 (age 31); Waterbury, Connecticut, United States
- Origin: Portugal
- Occupations: Singer; songwriter; YouTuber; internet celebrity
- Years active: 2014–present
- Label: Universal Music Portugal

Catarina Sofia Santos Filipe (born February 12, 1995) is an American-Portuguese singer, songwriter, YouTuber, and internet celebrity.

== Biography ==
The daughter of Portuguese emigrants, Catarina Filipe was born in Waterbury, in New Haven County, Connecticut, and lived for a year and a half in Naugatuck before her parents decided to return to Portugal. The family settled in Óbidos and later moved to Caldas da Rainha. In 2013, she moved to Lisbon to study business management at the Instituto Superior de Economia e Gestão, and began her career as an online content creator on YouTube in 2014.

In July 2019, she published her book Hashtag Sem Filtro, and that same year she moved to Brazil with her boyfriend, living for six months in São Paulo.

In April 2022, she launched her music career with her debut single "Xeque-Mate", and that same year she began performing live. Since then, she has appeared on stages including Rock in Rio, Arraial do Técnico, MEO Sudoeste, and Festival Authentica. In January 2023, she launched a podcast titled Close Friends together with a friend. On August 31, 2024, she proposed to her boyfriend, Viny.

== Discography ==
=== Singles ===
Title	Year	Album
"Xeque-Mate"	2022	Non-album singles
"SLOW MO"	2022	Non-album singles
"MALVADAS"	2022	Non-album singles
"DEZASSEIS"	2022	Non-album singles
"Drunk Again" (with ÁTOA)	2023	Non-album singles
"CLOUD9"	2023	Non-album singles
"G$D"	2023	Non-album singles
"Vinte e Quatro"	2024	Non-album singles
"Sinais"	2024	Non-album singles
"Sorte A Nossa"	2024	Non-album singles

== Bibliography ==
- Hashtag Sem Filtro (2019) – ISBN 9789896657765
