= Alcobaça =

Alcobaça may refer to:

- Alcobaça, Bahia, a municipality in Brazil
- Alcobaça, Portugal, a municipality in Portugal
  - Alcobaça Monastery
  - Alcobaça wine
