= Tinta Francisca =

Variety of grape

Tinta Francisca is a red wine grape found primarily in the Douro DOC and is sometimes used in Port wine production. The grape is often confused with the similarly named Touriga Francesa. There are some theories that the grape may be related to Pinot noir but no ampelographical link has yet been discovered between the two varieties. The grape is known for its sweet perfume but has less concentration than other Port grapes.

== See also ==
- List of Port wine grapes
- List of Portuguese grape varieties
