= Morete =

Morete may refer to:

- Carlos Morete, a retired Argentine football striker
- a synonym for the Portuguese Baga grape variety
