= Encostas d'Aire DOC =

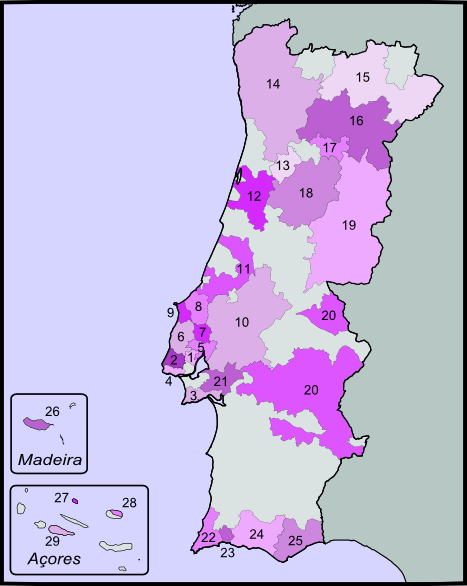
Map of the DOCs and IPRs of Portugal - number 11 is Encostas d'Aire DOC.

Encostas d'Aire is a Portuguese wine region located on the limestone hills extending across the northern end of the wider Lisboa wine region into the southwestern corner of the Beiras region. The region was initially an Indicação de Proveniencia Regulamentada (IPR) region, but in 2005, it was elevated to Denominação de Origem Controlada (DOC) status, and at the same time the Alcobaça IPR was merged into Encostas d'Aire to form a subregion.

Despite similar names, the Encostas d'Aire DOC is quite distinct from the former Encostas da Nave IPR located in the northern half of the Beiras region, which is now part of Távora-Varosa DOC and no longer used on wine labels, reducing the risk of confusion.

== Grapes ==
The principle grapes of the Encostas d'Aire region include Arinto, Baga, Fernao Pires, Periquita, Tamarez, Tinta Amarela and Vital.

== Subregions ==
There are two subregions which may be indicated on the label together with the name Encostas d'Aire:

- Alcobaça, formerly a separate IPR
- Ourém

== See also ==
- List of Portuguese wine regions
