= Bical =

Bical may refer to:

- Bical (grape), a white Portuguese wine grape
- Bicalutamide (shorthand and brand name), an antiandrogen
- Bical, a poetic form in Waray literature
- BICAL, psychometric analysis software written by students of Benjamin Drake Wright

== Barangays in the Philippines ==
Alphabetical by province, then municipality

- Bical, Lal-lo, Cagayan
- Bical, Peñablanca, Cagayan
- Bical, San Fernando, Camarines Sur
- Bical, Muñoz, Nueva Ecija
- Bical, Mabalacat, Pampanga
- Bical, Bulan, Sorsogon
