= Alenquer DOC =

Coordinates: 39.057°N 9.012°W

Alenquer is a Portuguese wine region centered on the town of Alenquer in the Lisboa wine region. The region is designated as Denominação de Origem Controlada (DOC) after it was promoted from its former Indicação de Proveniencia Regulamentada (IPR) status. Located in a valley in the district of Lisboa, wine grapes are able to ripen easily and produce full bodied red wines that have a spicy, peppery aroma. The white wines tend to be dry with a creamy mouthfeel.

== Grapes ==
The principal grapes of the Alenquer region include Arinto, Camarate, Fernão Pires, Graciano, Yambina, Mortagua, Periquita, Preto Martinho and Vital.

== See also ==
- List of Portuguese wine regions
