= Bucelas DOC =

Portuguese wine region

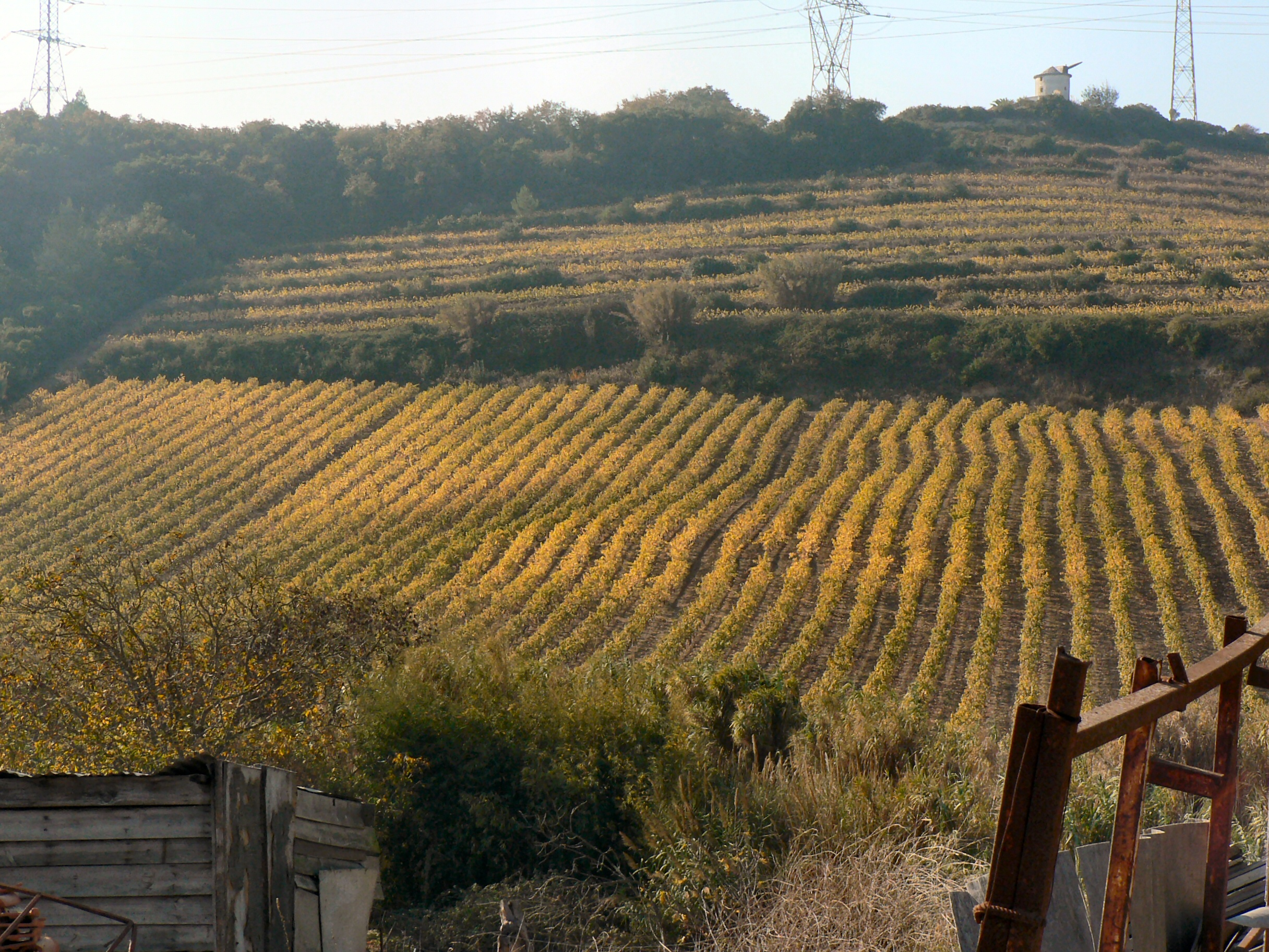
Vineyards in Bucelas

Bucelas (historically known as Bucellas) is a Portuguese wine-region located in the Lisboa wine-region. The region has Portugal's highest wine classification as a Denominação de Origem Controlada (DOC). Located south of the Arruda DOC, the region is noted for its potential for cool fermentation white wine production. Vineyards in the area are planted on predominantly loam soils. The white wines of Bucelas became widely popular during the Elizabethan era in England and again during the Victorian age. In London the wines were sometimes described as Portuguese hock because of their similarities to the German Rieslings from the Rhine. Urban sprawl in the 20th century has drastically reduced viticulture in the area, located north of the Portuguese capital city, Lisbon.

== History ==
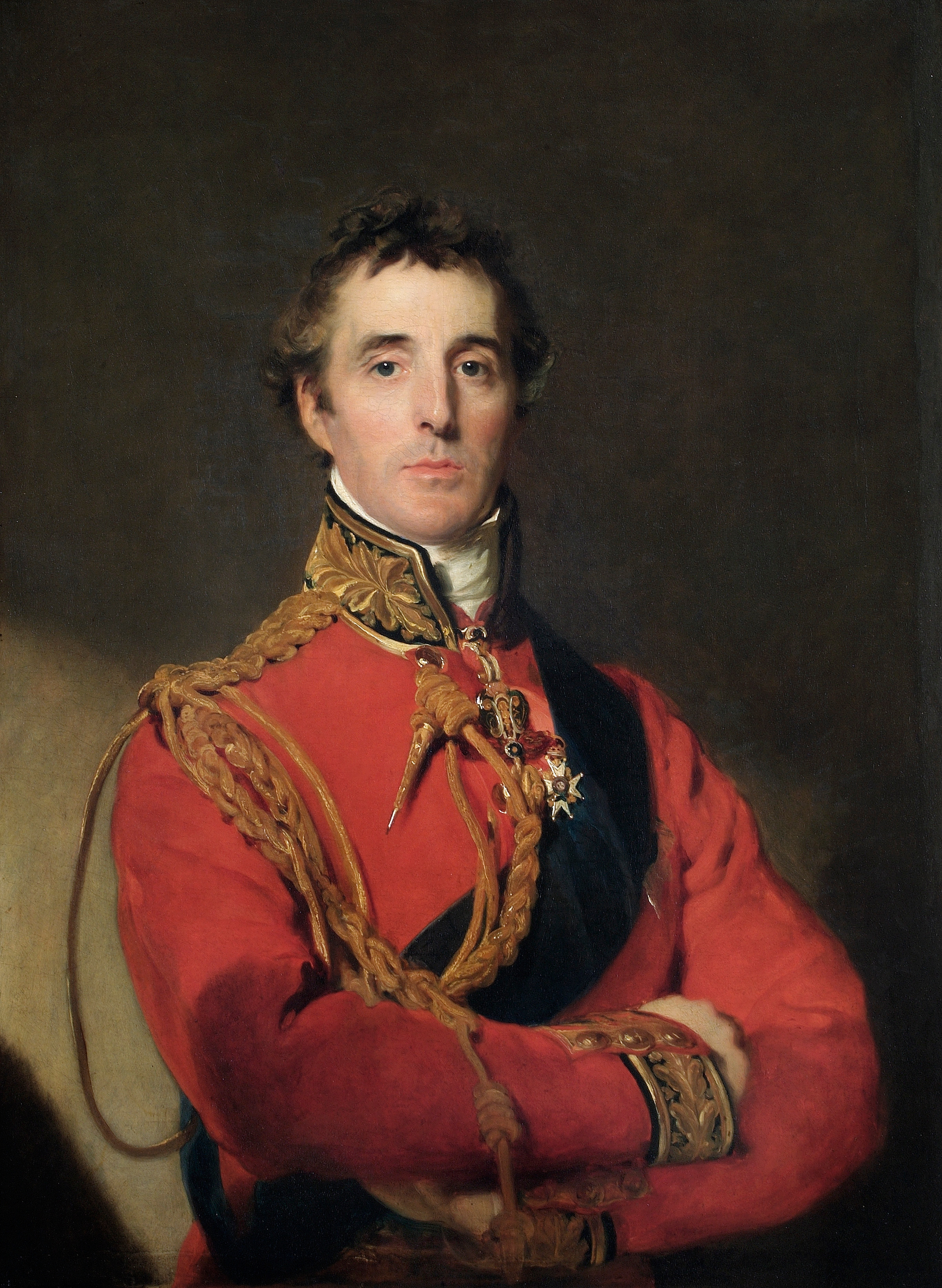
The Duke of Wellington helped popularize Bucelas wines in London after he discovered them while fighting in the Peninsular War

Viticulture in Bucelas, located just north of Lisbon, has likely existed since Roman times. Historically a white wine, during the Elizabethan age it was popular among the English as a fortified wine with wine historians believing that the wine was likely the same "Charneco" wine mentioned by William Shakespeare in the play Henry VI, Part 2 with Charneco being a local village in the Bucelas region. Eventually Bucelas was made as a non-fortified white wine, with British interests in the wine being revived during the Victorian age following the Peninsular War. During his time in Portugal, Arthur Wellesley, 1st Duke of Wellington discovered the wine and imported large quantities back to his estate in the United Kingdom. With Wellington's favor, soon Bucelas was a fashionable wine on the London wine market where it was known as Portuguese Hock.

During the 20th century, urban sprawl and development contributed to the decline of viticulture and winemaking in the region. By the early 1980s, all the vineyard lands in Bucelas was owned by a single wine estate with a poor reputation for quality. Towards the turn of the century, following a wave of enthusiasm and revival for Portuguese's indigenous grape varieties, new winemakers started to set up operation in the area to produce wines from the local grapes.

== Grapes and winemaking ==
The principal grapes of the Bucelas region includes Arinto and Esgana Cão. In the Victorian age, Bucelas' association as Portuguese Hock lead many in the wine industry to assume that its primary grape, Arinto, was somehow related to German wine grape Riesling. Ampelographers in the late 20th century were eventually able to disprove any relation between the two grapes. A characteristic of Arinto and its blending partner Esgana Cão, a name loosely translated to mean dog strangler, is their ability to retain high levels of acidity even in the warm sub-Mediterranean climate near Portugal's coast.

In recent years, Bucelas winemakers have been experimenting with different winemaking techniques including production of late harvest and sparkling wines made according to the traditional method.

== See also ==
- List of Portuguese wine regions
