= Cornifesto =

Variety of grape

Cornifesto is a red Portuguese wine grape variety used in the production of Port. In Port production it is considered a minor grape that is usually used to make lighter bodied wines. It originated from the crossing of Castellana Blanca and Alfrocheiro Preto.

== Synonyms ==
Various synonyms have been used to describe Cornifesto and its wines including Cornifeito, Cornifesta, Cornifesto Tinto, Cornifesto no Dão, Cornifresco and Tinta Bastardeira. It is known as Gajo arroba in the Arribes del Duero appellation in Zamora, Spain, and has been included in the Spanish variety catalogue with number 20092017.

== See also ==
- List of Port wine grapes
