= Carcavelos =

Civil parish in Cascais, Portugal

Coordinates: 38°41′00″N 9°20′00″W

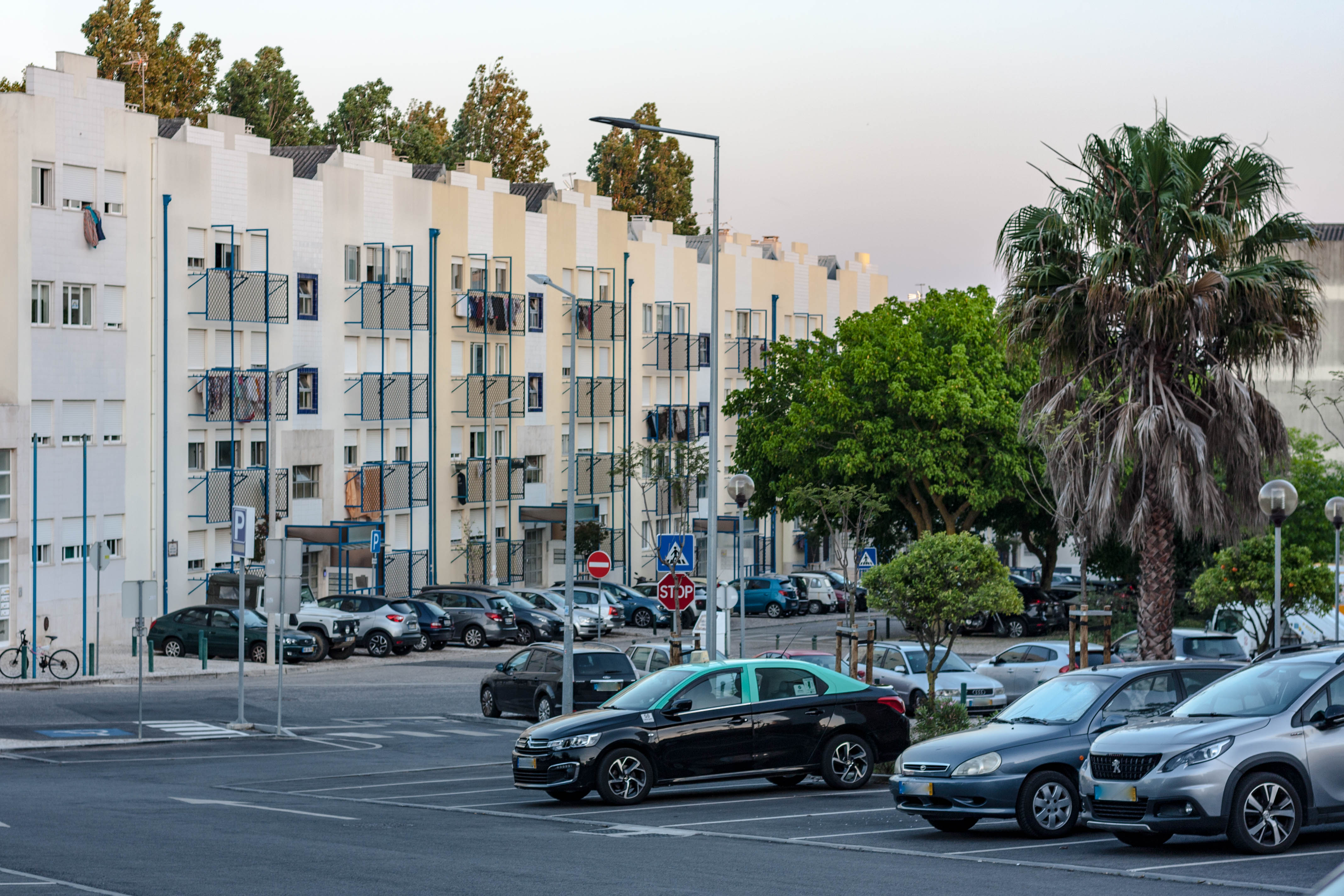
Urban Carcavelos

Carcavelos (Portuguese pronunciation: [kɐɾkɐˈvɛluʃ]) was, until 2013, a civil parish in the Portuguese municipality of Cascais, about 12 kilometres (7.5 mi) west of Lisbon. In 2013, the parish merged into the new parish Carcavelos e Parede. The parish was known for the Carcavelos wine. With the decline of the winemaking industry in the region, the attractiveness of its beaches have made the parish a destination for surfing, due to the waves here.

At the mouth of the Tagus River and east of the main beach is the fortification of Fort of São Julião da Barra. It was used to protect the Tagus from enemy ships, but in the 20th century it became the official summer residence of the Minister of Defense.

In the 19th and 20th centuries, Carcavelos was an important landing point in the international telegraph network, providing crucial communication links for the British Empire; most of the links were run by Cable & Wireless company forerunners.

Carcavelos is home to a number of international schools including Saint Julian's School, and Nova School of Business and Economics.

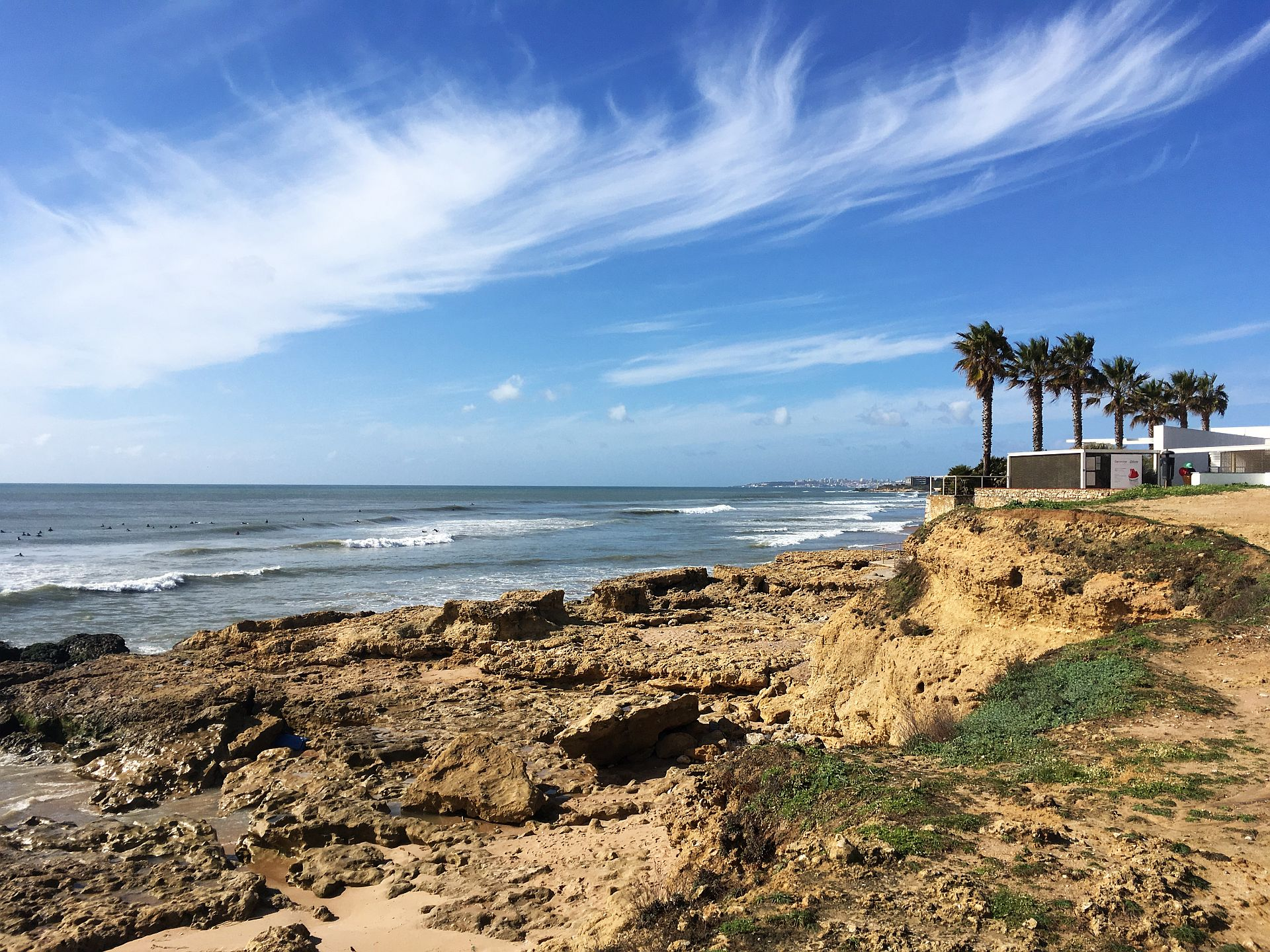

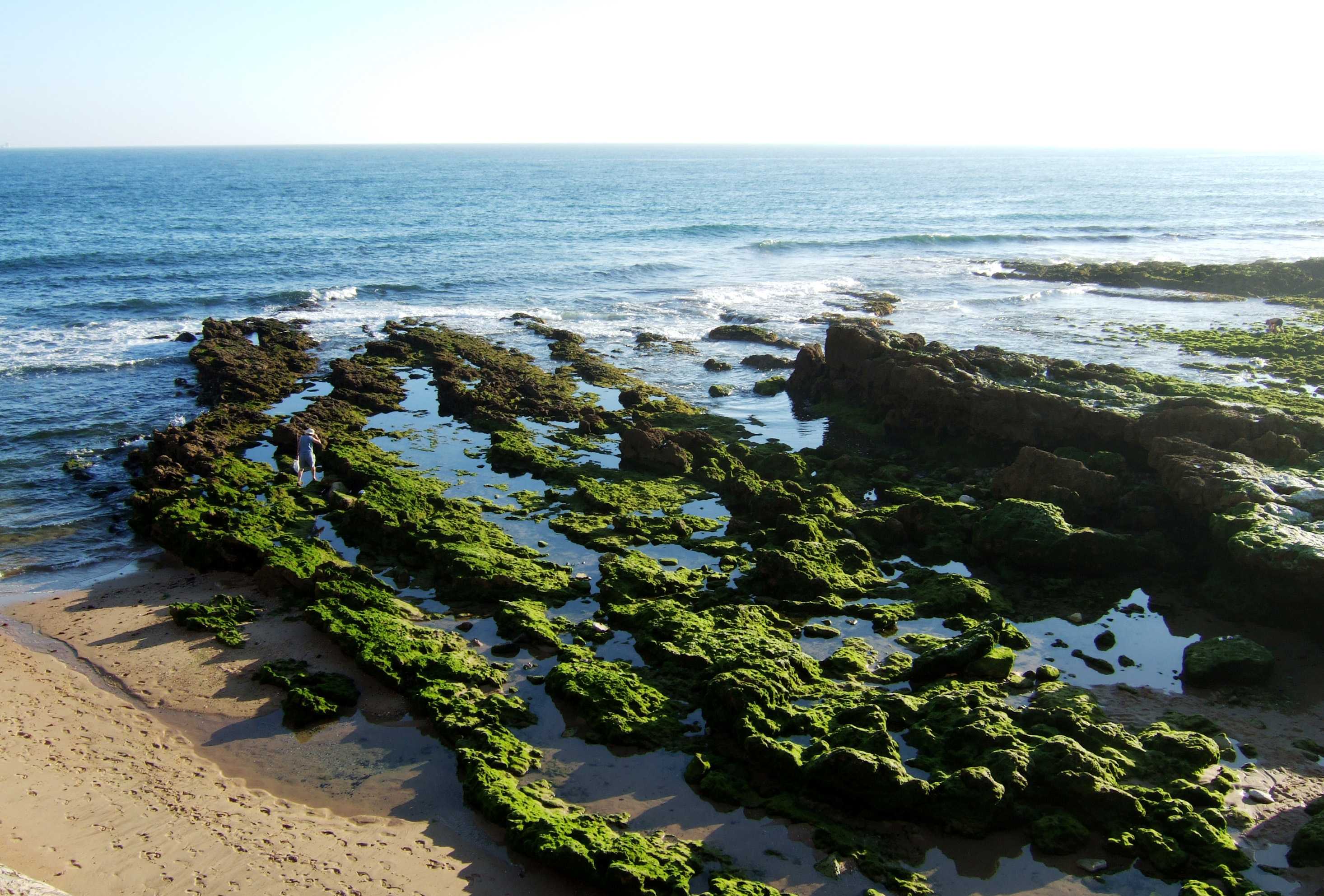

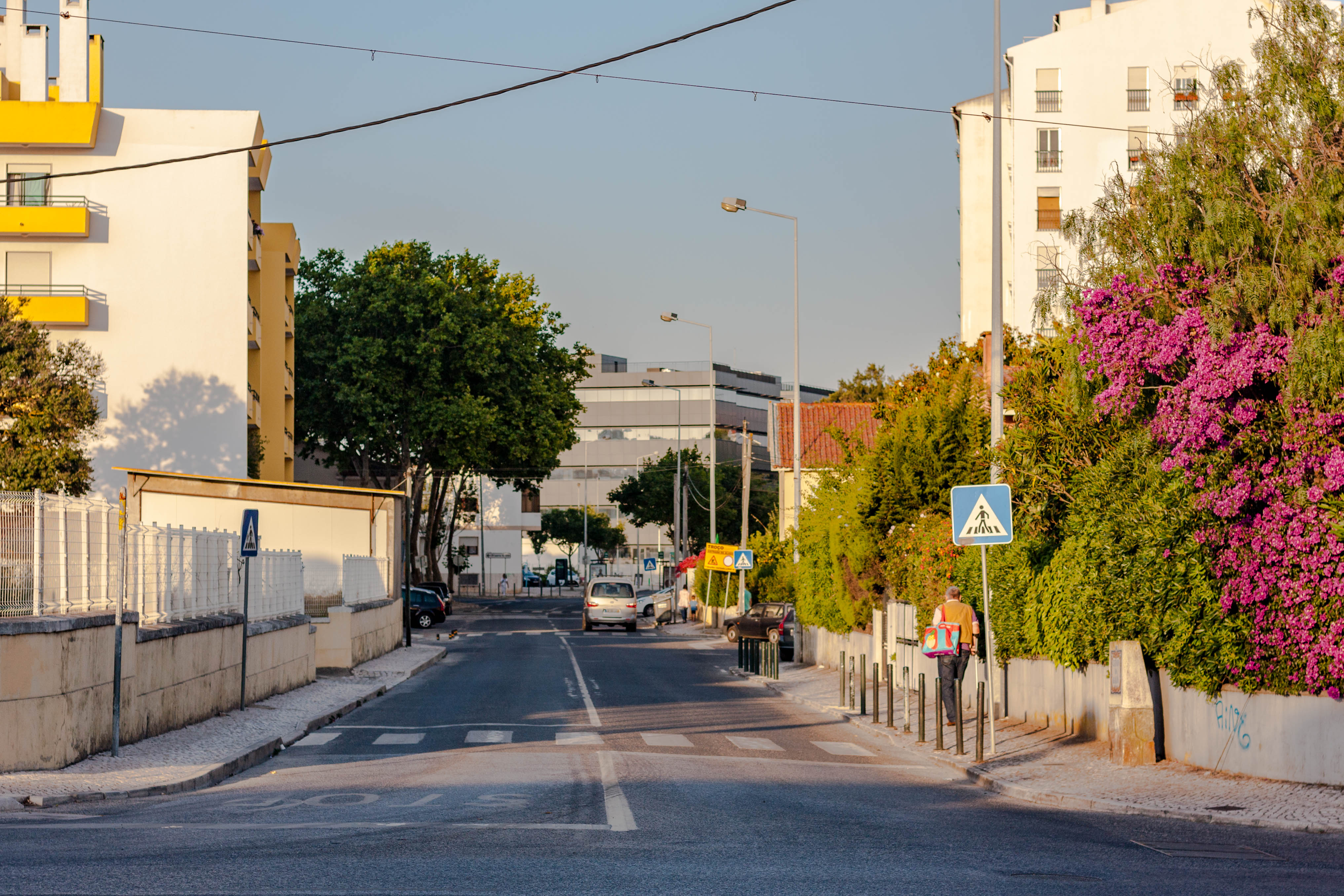

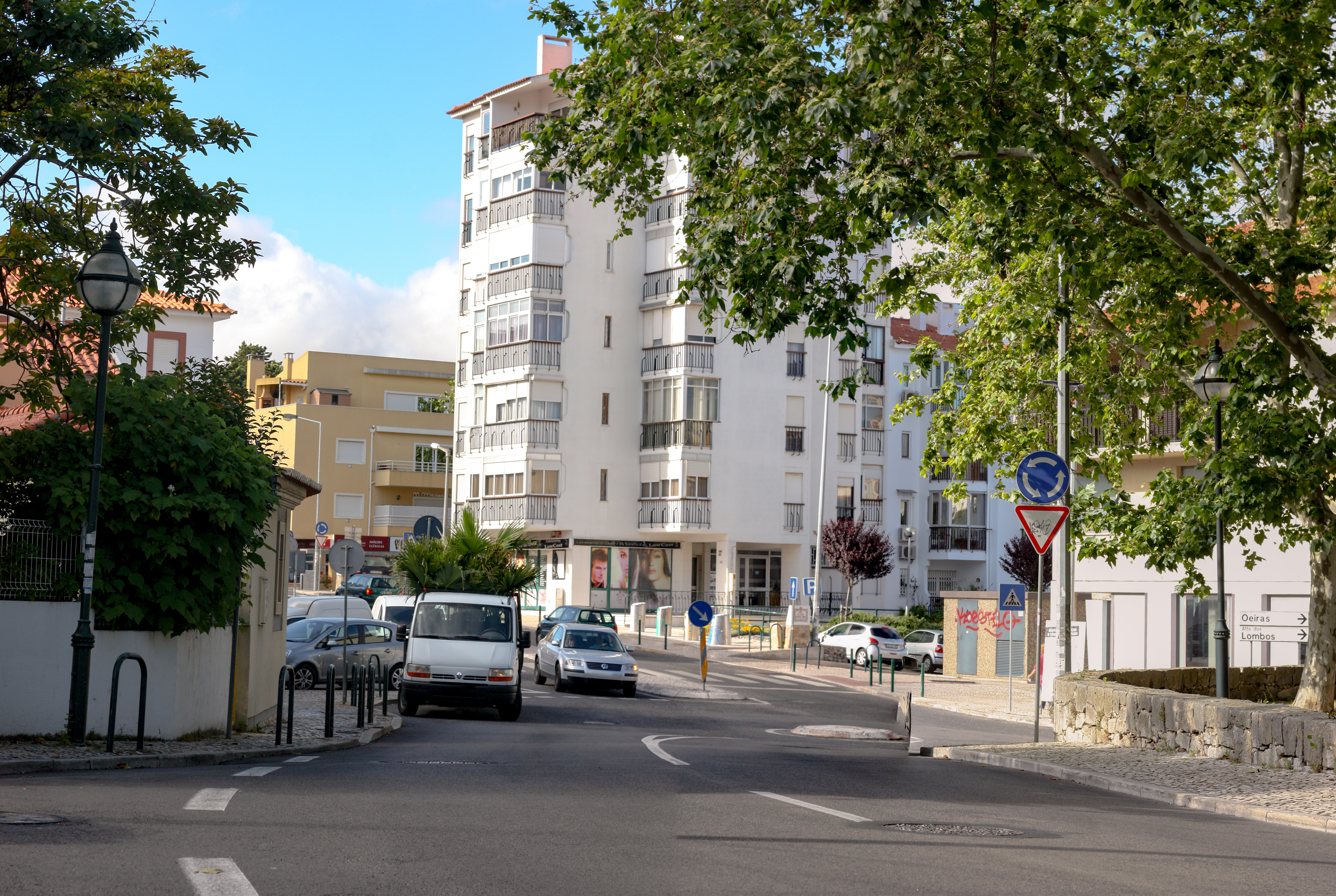

== See also ==
- Carcavelos DOC
