= Arruda DOC =

Arruda is a Portuguese wine region centered on the town of Arruda dos Vinhos in the Lisboa wine region. The region is designated as Denominação de Origem Controlada (DOC) after it was promoted from its former Indicação de Proveniencia Regulamentada (IPR) status. The region is known primarily for its red wine production.

== Grapes ==
The principle grapes of the Arruda region include Camarate, Fernao Pires, Graciano, Jampal, Trincadeira and Vital.

== See also ==
- List of Portuguese wine regions
