= Mureto =

Variety of grape

- Grape (Vitis)
- Color of berry skin: Noir
- Species: Vitis vinifera
- Also called: See list of synonyms
- Origin: Portugal

Mureto is a red Portuguese wine grape variety.

== Synonyms ==
Mureto is also known under the synonyms Malvasia Preta, Moreto, Mureto du Dão, Muretto, and Sillas.

== Other grape varieties ==
Mureto is used as a synonym for the grape variety Camarate Tinto. Mureto do Alentejo is a synonym for Moreto.

== See also ==
- List of Portuguese grape varieties
