= Duriense VR =

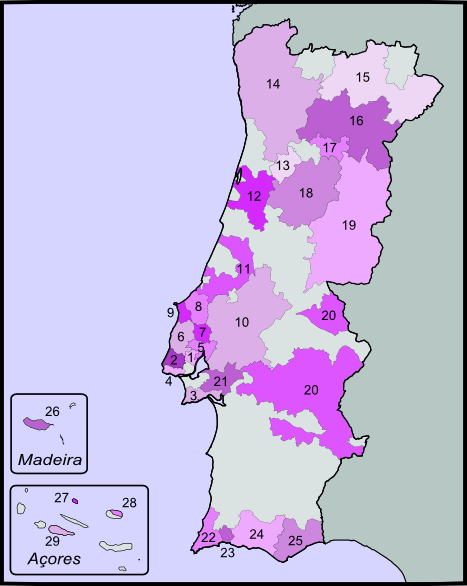
Map of the DOCs and IPRs of Portugal. Number 16 corresponds to Douro DOC and Duriense VR.

Duriense is a Portuguese wine region covering the same area as the Douro DOC and the Port wine region. In difference from Douro DOC, Duriense VR is a designation at the lower Vinho Regional (VR) level, which corresponds to table wines with a geographical indication under European Union wine regulations, similar to a French vin de pays region. Thus, it is the simpler or less typical wines of the Douro region that are sold using a Duriense VR label.

Before the creation of a separate Duriense VR, the Douro vineyards were part of the former Trás-os-Montes VR, which is now called Transmontano VR and no longer includes the Douro vineyards.

Donzelinho branco is one of the authorized grape permitted to be blended in the wines of Duriense.

== See also ==
- List of Portuguese wine regions
