= Óbidos DOC =

Wine region of Portugal

Óbidos is a Portuguese wine region centered on the town of Óbidos in the Lisboa region. The region is designated as Denominação de Origem Controlada (DOC) after it was promoted from its former Indicação de Proveniencia Regulamentada (IPR) status in 2006.

The region produces both red and white wines with the white wines being traditionally used for distilled beverages.

== Grapes ==
The principle grapes of the Óbidos region include Arinto, Bastardo, Camarate, Fernao Pires, Periquita, Rabo de Ovelha, Tinta Miuda and Vital.

== See also ==
- List of Portuguese wine regions
