= Rabigato =

Variety of grape

- Grape (Vitis)
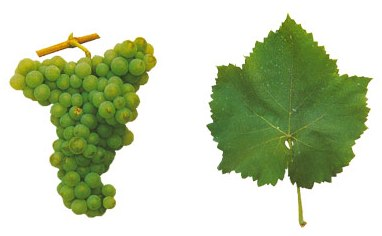
- Color of berry skin: Blanc
- Species: Vitis vinifera
- Origin: Portugal
- Notable regions: Douro
- VIVC number: 9857

Rabigato is a white Portuguese wine grape variety that is popularly grown in the Douro Region especially Douro Superior.

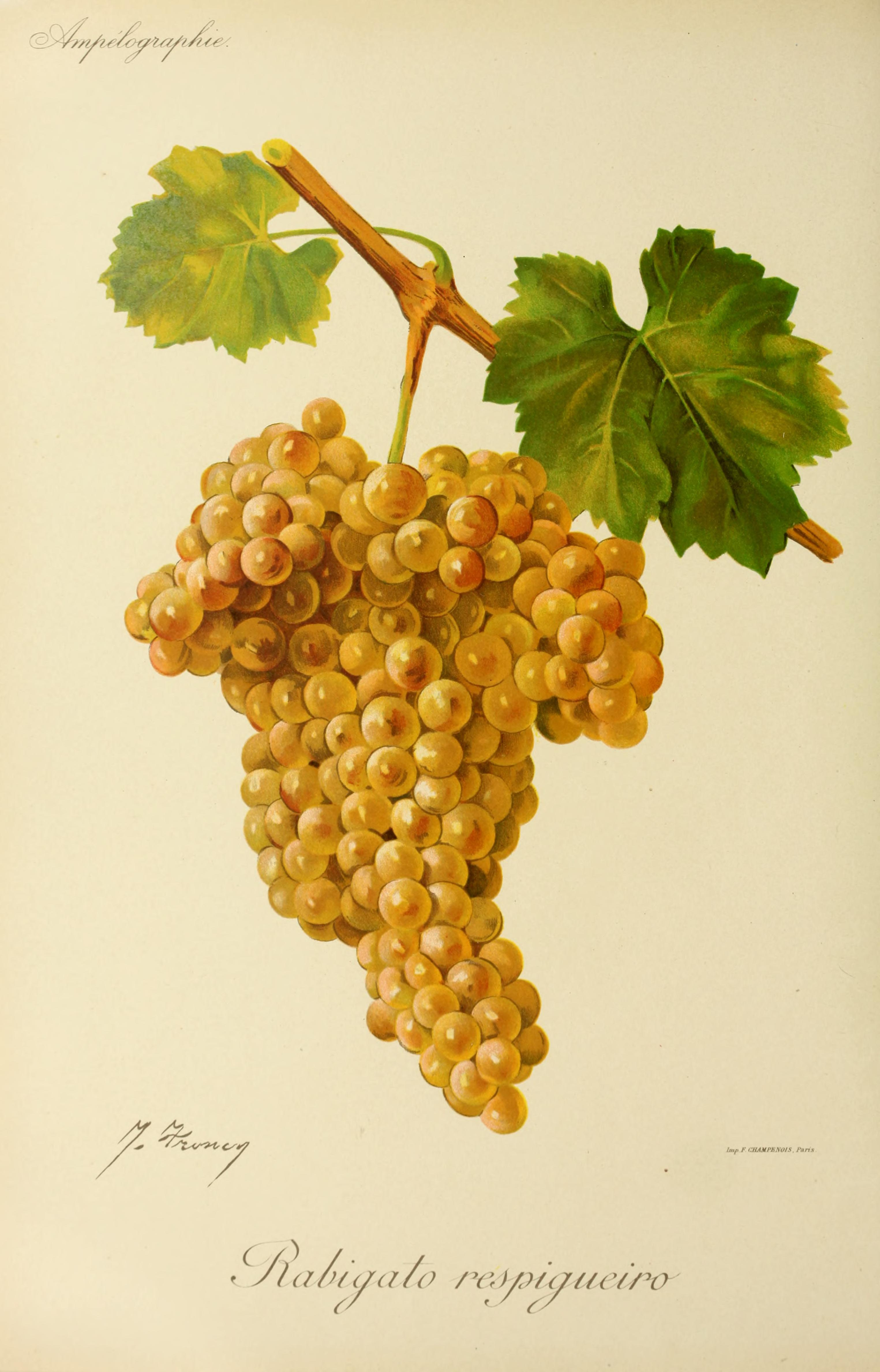
Rabigato respigueiro, a synonym of Rabigato, Jules Troncy, 1901-1910
