= Obidos (software) =

Original page rendering engine used by Amazon.com

Obidos was the name used by Amazon.com for their original page rendering engine, and appears in many of their URLs such as https://www.amazon.com/exec/obidos/ASIN/0596515162. Obidos was phased out in 2006 and replaced by the Gurupa engine. Amazon.com subsequently used the name for their building at 551 Boren Ave N, Seattle, WA 98109, United States.

It was named after the town of Óbidos in Brazil near the swiftest point on the Amazon River, which is in turn named after the town of Óbidos, Portugal.

== See also ==
- Óbidos, Portugal
- Óbidos, Pará
