= Vital (grape) =

Variety of grape

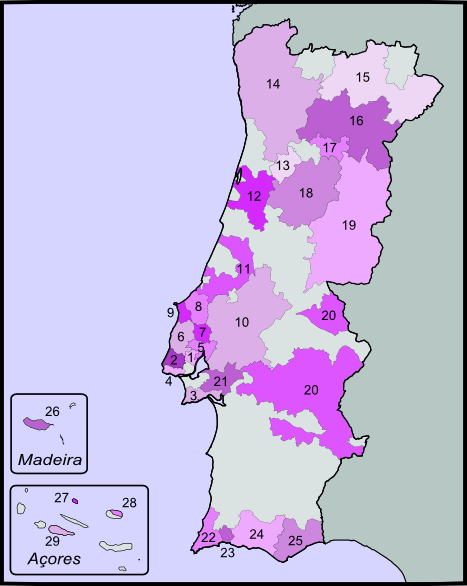
The grape variety Vital is grown primarily in the western wine regions of Portugal in regions such as 3. Setúbal DOC, 5. Alenquer DOC, 6. Torres Vedras DOC, 7. Arruda DOC, 8. Óbidos DOC, 10. Tejo DOC and 11. Encostas d'Aire DOC

Vital is a white Portuguese wine grape variety that is grown primarily in Western Portugal. Sometimes known under the synonym Malvasia Corado, the variety tends to produce rather neutral flavor wine with low acidity unless the grape is grown in vineyards of high altitude.

Another common synonym in the Lisboa VR of the former Estremadura Province is Malvasia Fina though ampelographers are not sure if Vital is related to the Malvasia grown widely in Italy, Greece and throughout Europe. One key difference that ampelographers note is that the shape of the leaves of Vital and the various Malvasia species tend to be very different. Even in the Douro DOC there is a Malvasia Fina used in Port wine production that may or may not be the same variety as Vital.

== List of DOCs ==
Vital is a permitted variety in several Portuguese wine regions including the following Denominação de Origem Controlada (DOC)s:

- Alenquer DOC
- Arruda DOC
- Encostas d'Aire DOC
- Óbidos DOC
- Tejo DOC
- Setúbal DOC
- Torres Vedras DOC

== Winemaking and wine styles ==
In addition to growing Vital in higher altitude vineyards to maintain acidity, winemakers will often complement Vital's somewhat bland flavors with blending with other varieties or with a little bit of oak aging. According to wine expert Oz Clarke, well made examples of Vital can exhibit an interesting minerality.

== Synonyms ==
In addition to Malvasia Corada and Malvasia Fina, Vital is known under several various synonyms including: Boal Bonifacio, Malvazia Corada, Malvasia Fina de Douro, Malvasia Fina do Douro and Malvasia ou Malvazia.
