= Moreto =

Variety of grape

- Grape (Vitis)
- Moreto grapes and leaf
- Color of berry skin: Noir
- Species: Vitis vinifera
- Also called: See list of synonyms
- Origin: Portugal
- VIVC number: 7992

Moreto is a red Portuguese wine grape variety that is planted primarily in the Alentejo. As a varietal, the grape makes neutral wines.

== Synonyms ==
Moreto is also known under the synonyms Arruya, Castellao, Moreto d'Alenteijo, Moreto d'Alentejo, Moreto do Dão, Morito, Mureto do Alentejo, Tinta de Alter.

== Other grape varieties ==
Moreto is also used as a synonym for the grape varieties Lambrusca di Alessandria, Camarate Tinto, Baga and Mureto.

== See also ==
- List of Portuguese wine grape varieties
