= Tinta Carvalha =

Variety of grape

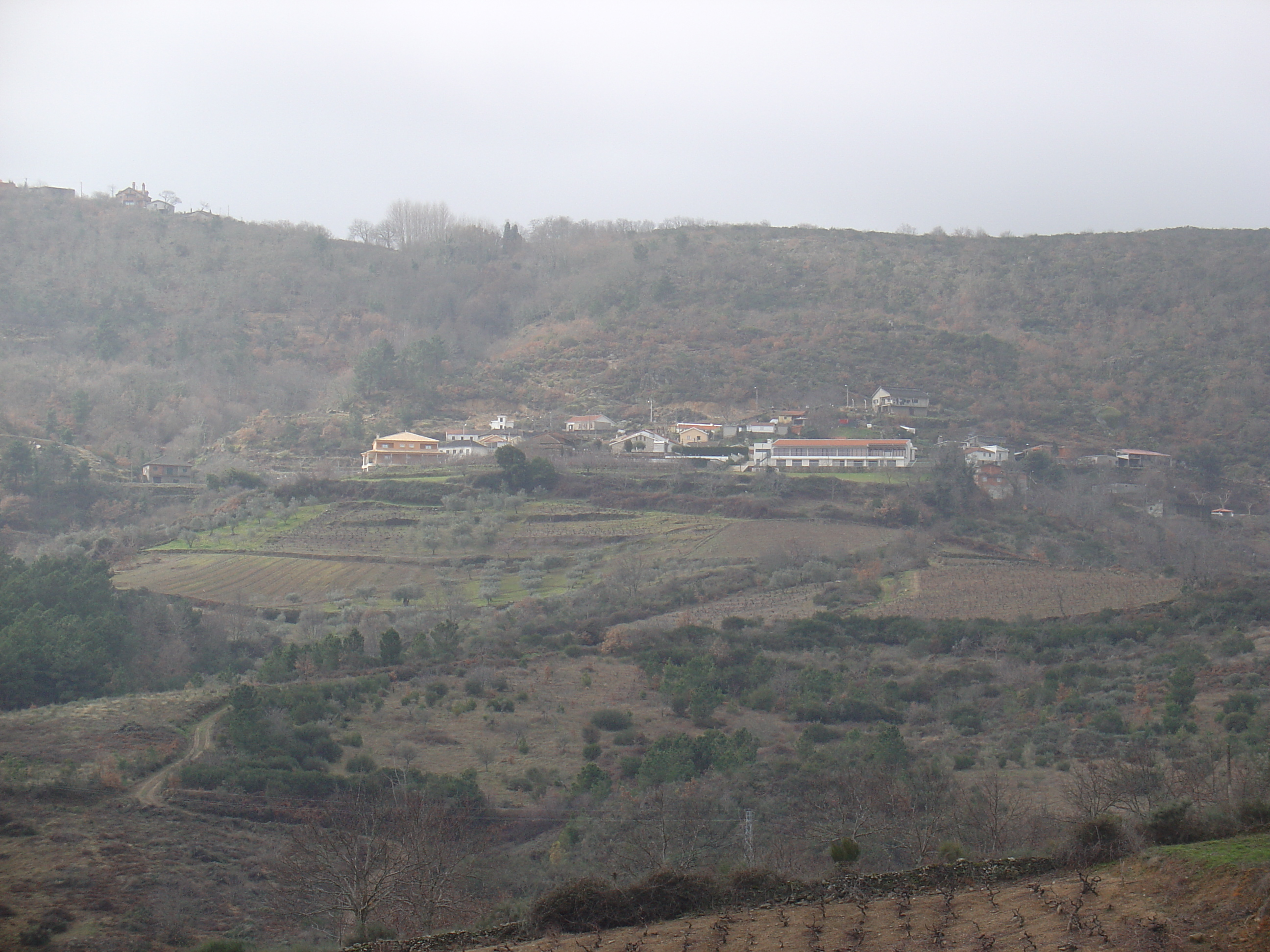
Tinta Carvalha is widely planted in the Valpaços region of the Trás-os-Montes e Alto Douro Province of northeast Portugal.

Tinta Carvalha is a red Portuguese wine grape variety that is widely planted throughout Portugal, most notably in the Trás-os-Montes e Alto Douro Province, due to its easy maintenance and high yield potential. It is primarily a blending grape that on its own tends to produce light bodied, undistinguished wines. It is an approved grape variety used in Port wine production as well as the non-fortified wines of the Chaves and Valpaços wine region.

== Synonyms ==
Over the years Tinta Carvalha has been known under a variety of synonyms including: Carvalha, Lobão, Tinta Carvalha do Douro, Tinta Carvalha do Tras-os-Montes and Preto Gordo.
