= Tinta Miuda =

Variety of grape

Tinta Miuda is a Portuguese red wine grape that is grown primarily in the Oeste and Ribatejo regions. The grape is often used in the production of blended bulk and table wines but can also be used to produce varietal wine.

== See also ==
- List of Portuguese grape varieties
