= Fernando Nicolau de Almeida =

Portuguese winemaker (1913–1998)

- Born: 1913; Porto, Portugal
- Died: 1998 (aged 84–85); Porto
- Occupation: Oenologist
- Known for: Developing the Barca Velha wine

Fernando Nicolau de Almeida (1913–1998) was a pioneering Portuguese oenologist, best known for developing the Barca Velha red wine, one of the most expensive wines in Portugal.

== Early life ==
Fernando Moreira Pais Nicolau de Almeida was born in 1913, in Porto, the second city of Portugal after the capital, Lisbon. His family was involved in the production of Port wine. In his youth he was an active sportsman, playing football, rugby, tennis and golf, as well as rowing. He became the first Portuguese member of the Oporto Golf Club, an organization previously reserved for British businessmen in Porto, and, later, would become the first Portuguese president of the club.

== Career ==
Almeida's father was technical director of Casa Ferreirinha, a company set up by Antonia Ferreira, a leading port wine producer and exporter in the 19th century, who was known as Ferreirinha. He persuaded his son to join him in the wine business, and encouraged him to study chemistry and the English language, knowledge of which was essential for a leading port wine producer and exporter. By the early 1940s he was beginning to experiment with developing new wines. At the time, Casa Ferreirinha was concentrating on making red Vinho Verde for the Brazilian market but Almeida felt that there was scope to use the grape varieties normally used for Port wine, which is a fortified wine, to make good unfortified table wine. In 1949, he gave one of his red wines to Émile Peynaud, a French oenologist who was collaborating with Casa Ferreirinha at the time. Peynaud, who has been credited with revolutionizing winemaking in the latter half of the 20th century, was so impressed that he advised him to forget about Vinho Verde and concentrate on producing red wines that would mature with age.

Following this advice, in 1950 Almeida visited the main French wine-growing regions of Burgundy and Bordeaux, as well as Rioja in Spain, in order to study the fermentation techniques used there, which were different from those used in Portugal. Fermentation in winemaking in the areas he visited used a cooling system, in order to preserve the aromas and freshness of the wines. However, in Portugal at that time few farms had electricity and there were no temperature-controlled fermentation vats. Working at his family's estate, Quinta do Vale Meão, Almeida built a container with double walls, in which he placed ice, shipped from Matosinhos near Porto. The wine he made in 1952, called Barca Velha, was not marketed until 1960. From then, he limited marketing of the wine to years in which he considered that the conditions were ideal. Between 1952 and 2021, only 20 harvests were selected as being suitable. In other years the wine was called Reserva Especial Ferreirinha.

== Wine organizations ==
Almeida also produced high-quality port wines. He was one of the founders, in 1982, of the Confraria do Vinho do Porto, a body set up to promote, disseminate and consolidate the worldwide reputation of port wine, and he was its first chancellor. He was also on the advisory board of the Instituto dos Vinhos do Douro e do Porto from its beginning, and played a leading role in the Association of Port Wine Companies. He was one of the pioneers of bottling port wine at origin, unlike the previous practice of shipping in bulk.

Almeida received an honorary doctorate from the Catholic University of Portugal. In his spare time, he painted, being a lover of the Flemish school, especially Pieter Bruegel the Elder and Hieronymus Bosch.

== Death ==
Fernando Nicolau de Almeida died in 1998.
