= Tinta Barroca =

Variety of grape

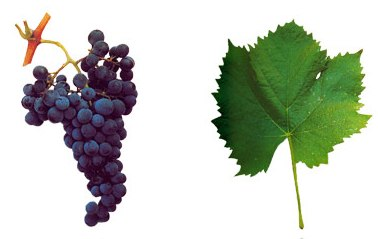
Tinta Barroca (cluster and leaf)

Tinta Barroca is a Portuguese red wine grape that is grown primarily in the Douro region with some plantings in South Africa and the Riverland wine region of Australia. In Portugal, it is a common blending grape in Port wine while in South Africa and Australia it is normally made into a varietal wine or blend with other grapes. The vine was introduced to the Douro region in the late 19th century and has the advantages of being able to withstand cool conditions while planted on north-facing slopes.

== See also ==
- List of Port wine grapes
- List of Portuguese grape varieties
