= Douro DOC =

Portuguese wine region

Alto Douro Wine Region
UNESCO World Heritage Site
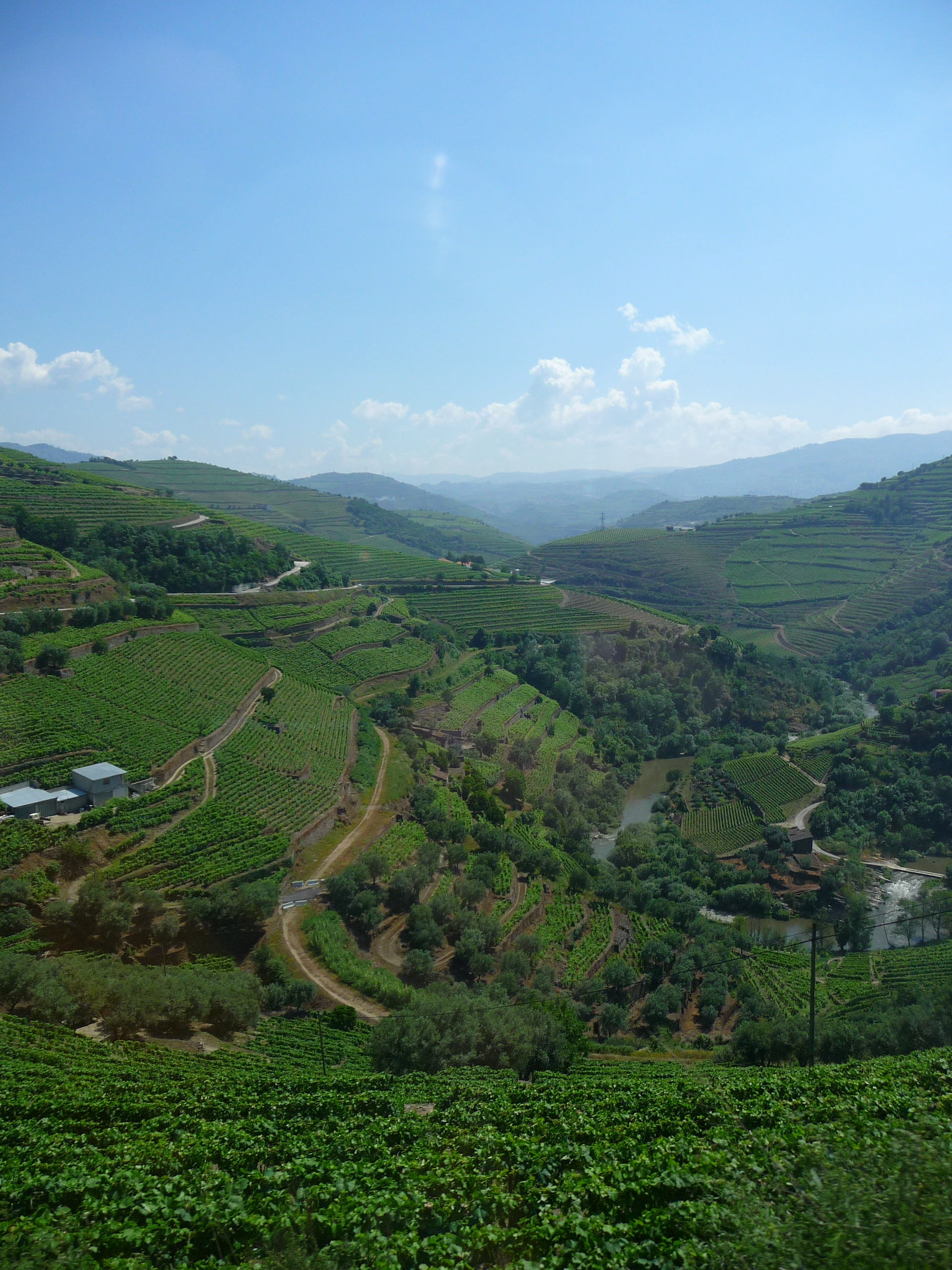
- Vineyards in Alto Douro

- Location within Portugal
- Location: Trás-os-Montes e Alto Douro Province, Portugal
- Criteria: Cultural: (iii)(iv)(v)
- Reference: 1046
- Inscription: 2001 (25th Session)
- Area: 24,600 ha (61,000 acres)
- Buffer zone: 225,400 ha (557,000 acres)
- Coordinates: 41°06′06″N 07°47′56″W

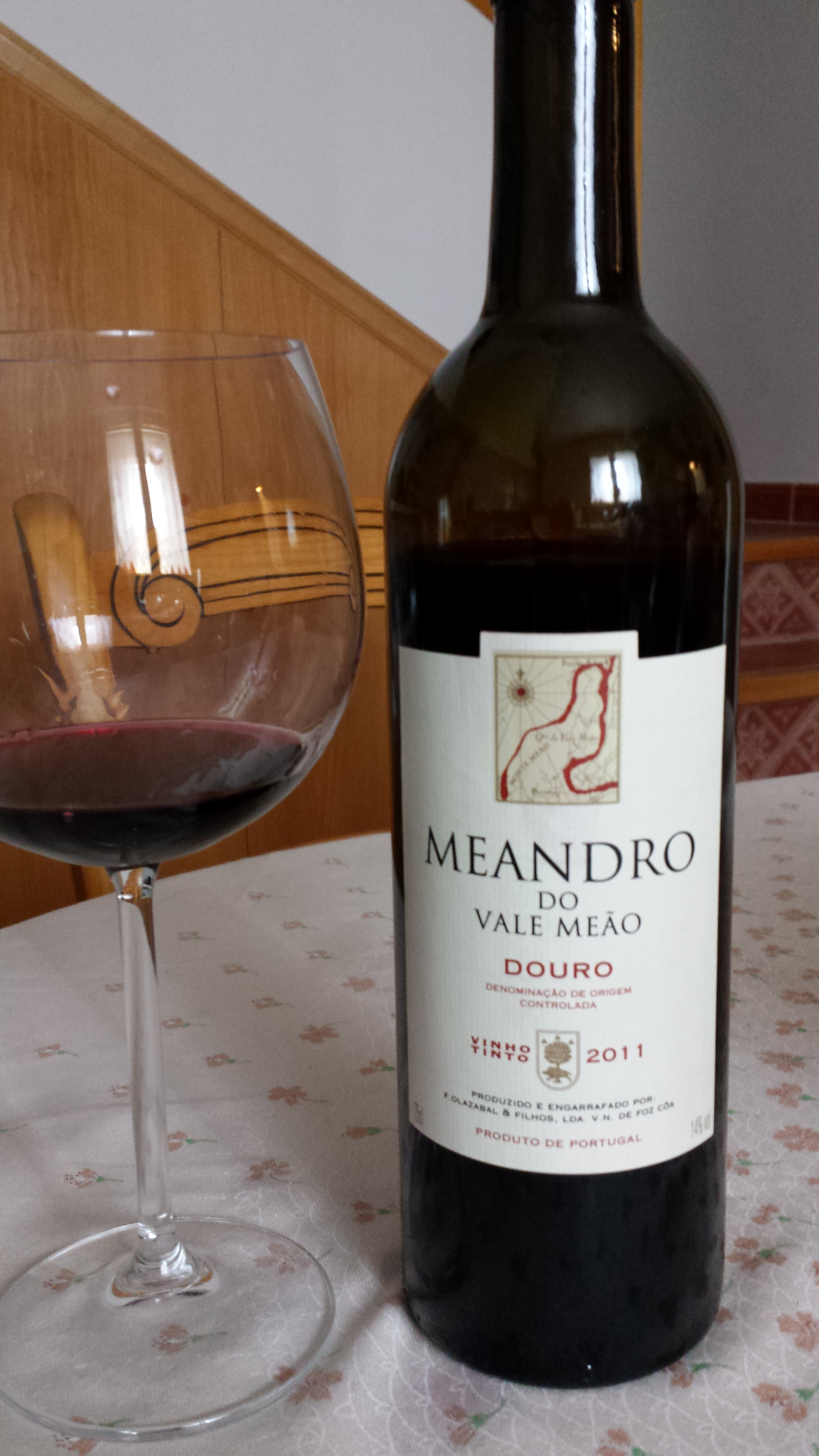
Douro DOC wine

Douro is a Portuguese wine region centered on the Douro River in the Trás-os-Montes e Alto Douro region. It is sometimes referred to as the Alto Douro (upper Douro), as it is located some distance upstream from Porto, sheltered by mountain ranges from coastal influence. The region has Portugal's highest wine classification as a Denominação de Origem Controlada (DOC) and is registered as a Protected Designation of Origin under EU and UK law, and as a Geographical Indication in several other countries through bilateral agreements. While the region is best known for Port wine production, the Douro produces just as much table wine (non-fortified wines) as it does fortified wine. The non-fortified wines are typically referred to as "Douro wines".

Alto Douro was one of the 13 regions of continental Portugal identified by geographer Amorim Girão, in a study published between 1927 and 1930. Together with Trás-os-Montes it became Trás-os-Montes e Alto Douro Province.

The style of wines produced in the Douro ranges from light, Bordeaux-style claret to rich Burgundian-style wines aged in new oak.

== History ==
There is archaeological evidence for winemaking in the region dating from the end of the Western Roman Empire, during the 3rd and 4th centuries AD, although grape seeds have also been found at older archaeological sites. In medieval times from the mid-12th century, Cistercians had an important influence on winemaking in the region, through their three monasteries Salzedas, São João de Tarouca and São Pedro das Águias.

In the 17th century, the region's vineyards expanded, and the earliest known mention of "Port wine" dates from 1675. The Methuen Treaty between Portugal and England in 1703, and the subsequent establishment of many British Port lodges in Porto meant that Port wine became the primary product of the region, and it became economically very important to Portugal. As part of the regulation of the production and trade of this valuable commodity, a royal Portuguese charter of 10 September 1756 defined the production region for Port wine. It thus became the world's first wine region to have a formal demarcation. The vineyards covered by this demarcation were situated in the western part of the present region. Later, the vineyards have progressively expanded to the east into hotter and drier areas.

Douro was not spared from the vine diseases of the 19th century. Powdery mildew (oidium) caused by Erysiphe necator struck in 1852 and Phylloxera in 1863.

While table wine has always been produced in the region, for a long time little of it was seen outside the region itself. The Port lodges were focused on the production and export of Port wine, which was their unique product on the export market, and had little interest in other wine styles. Thus, while the wines could be good, for a long time, there was no attempt to use Douro grapes to produce more ambitious table wine. The person credited with creating the first ambitious Douro wine is Fernando Nicolau de Almeida, who worked as an oenologist with the Port house Ferreira. He visited Bordeaux during World War II, which gave him inspiration for creating a top-quality table wine. The wine Barca Velha, first produced in 1952 using grapes from Quinta do Vale de Meão situated in the Douro Superior subregion, was the result. Barca Velha didn't immediately get many followers, since most Port wine houses remained uninterested in non-fortified wines for a long time. A few more ambitious Douro wines made their appearance from the 1970s, but it was not until the 1990s when a large number of wines made their appearance. A contributing factor was Portugal's entry into the European Economic Community in 1986, which meant that the Port lodges' monopoly was abolished, thus paving the way for producers in the Douro valley to produce and bottle their own wine - Port or dry Douro wines. At this stage, several Port houses also introduced Douro wines into their range.

The Douro winemaking region was declared a World Heritage Site in 2001.

== Geography and climate ==
The Douro wine region is situated around the Douro river valley and lower valleys of its tributaries Varosa, Corgo, Távora, Torto, and Pinhão. The region is sheltered from Atlantic winds by the Marão and Montemuro mountains and has a continental climate, with hot and dry summers and cold winters.

It is usually subdivided into three subregions, from the west to the east:

- Baixo Corgo ("below Corgo"), a subregion with the mildest climate and most precipitation. It has 14,000 hectares (35,000 acres) of vineyards. Although it is the subregion which was planted first, in general, it is considered to give wines of lesser quality than the other two subregions.
- Cima Corgo ("above Corgo") is the largest subregion with 19,000 hectares (47,000 acres) of vineyards, centered on the village of Pinhão, and where the majority of the famous Quintas are located.
- Douro Superior ("upper Douro") is the hottest and driest of the subregions, and stretches all the way to the Spanish border. It has 8,700 hectares (21,000 acres) of vineyards and is the source of many wines of very good quality. As it is the least accessible of the three subregions, it is the most recently planted, and it is still expanding.

Terraced vineyards are very common in the Douro region. Vineyards dedicated to Port production are usually planted on schist while areas with granite-based soils are used for table wine production.

== Grapes ==
The principal grape varieties of the Douro region include the black grapes Bastardo, Mourisco tinto, Tinta Amarela, Tinta Barroca, Tinta Cão, Tinta Roriz (the same as Spain's Tempranillo), Touriga Francesa and Touriga Nacional, and the white grapes Donzelinho branco, Gouveio, Malvasia Fina, Rabigato, and Viosinho.

A large number of grape varieties are grown in the Douro region, most of them local Portuguese grapes. For a long time, the grape varieties grown in the Douro were not very well studied. Vineyards of mixed plantation were the norm, and most of the time, the vineyard owners didn't know which grape varieties they were growing. A pioneering effort were made in the 1970s which identified Touriga Nacional, Tinta Roriz, Touriga Franca, Tinta Cão and Tinta Barroca as the prime dark-skinned grape varieties. Tinta Amarela and the teinturier Sousão has later come to be included among the varieties that attract the most interest. This work was important for creating the new wave of top Douro wines and has also led to a greater focus on the grape varieties that go into Port wine. Most top quintas now replant with single-variety vineyards and focus on a limited number of varieties, but older, mixed vineyards will remain in production for many decades to come.

== Gallery ==
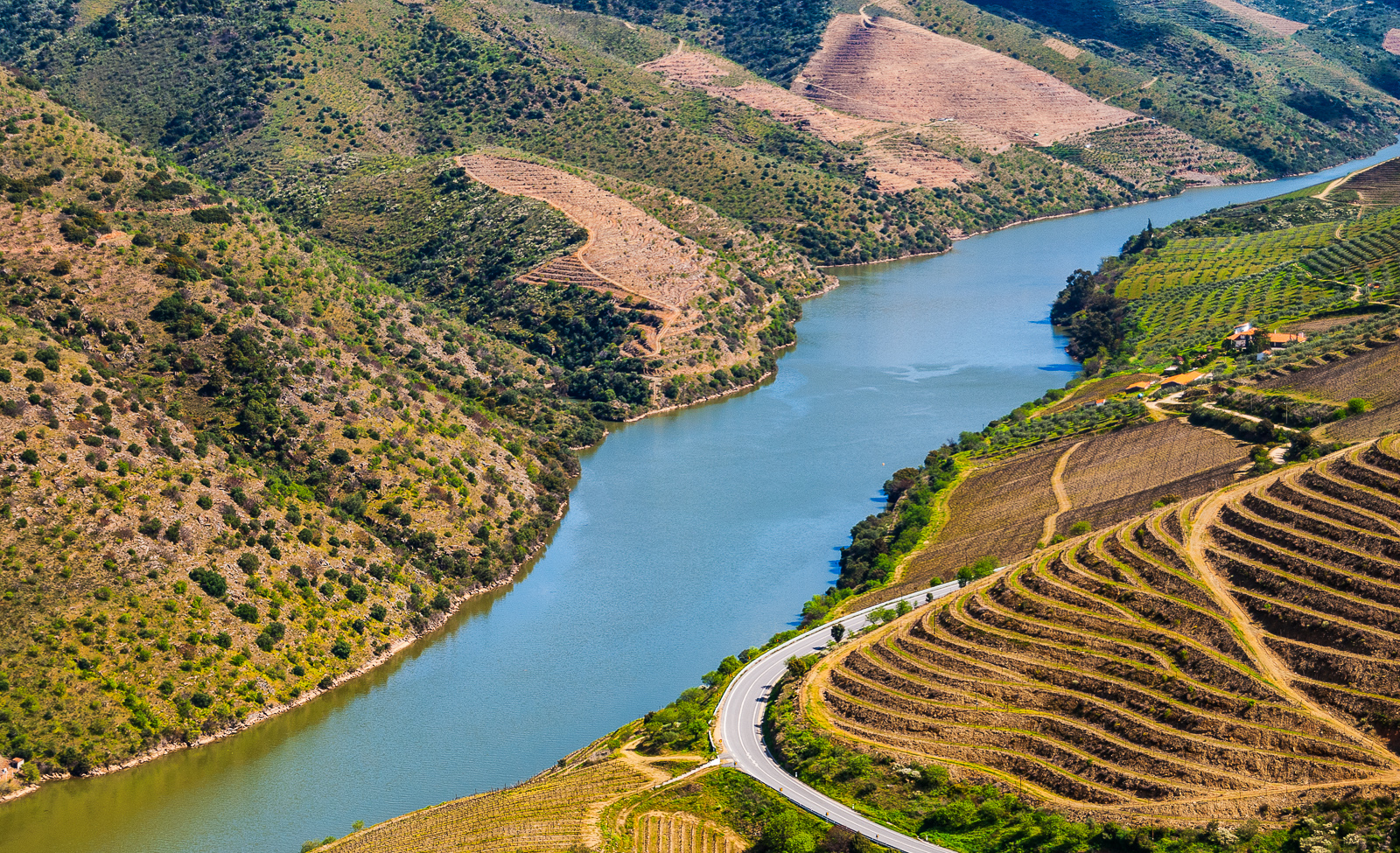
Terraced vineyards along the Douro river

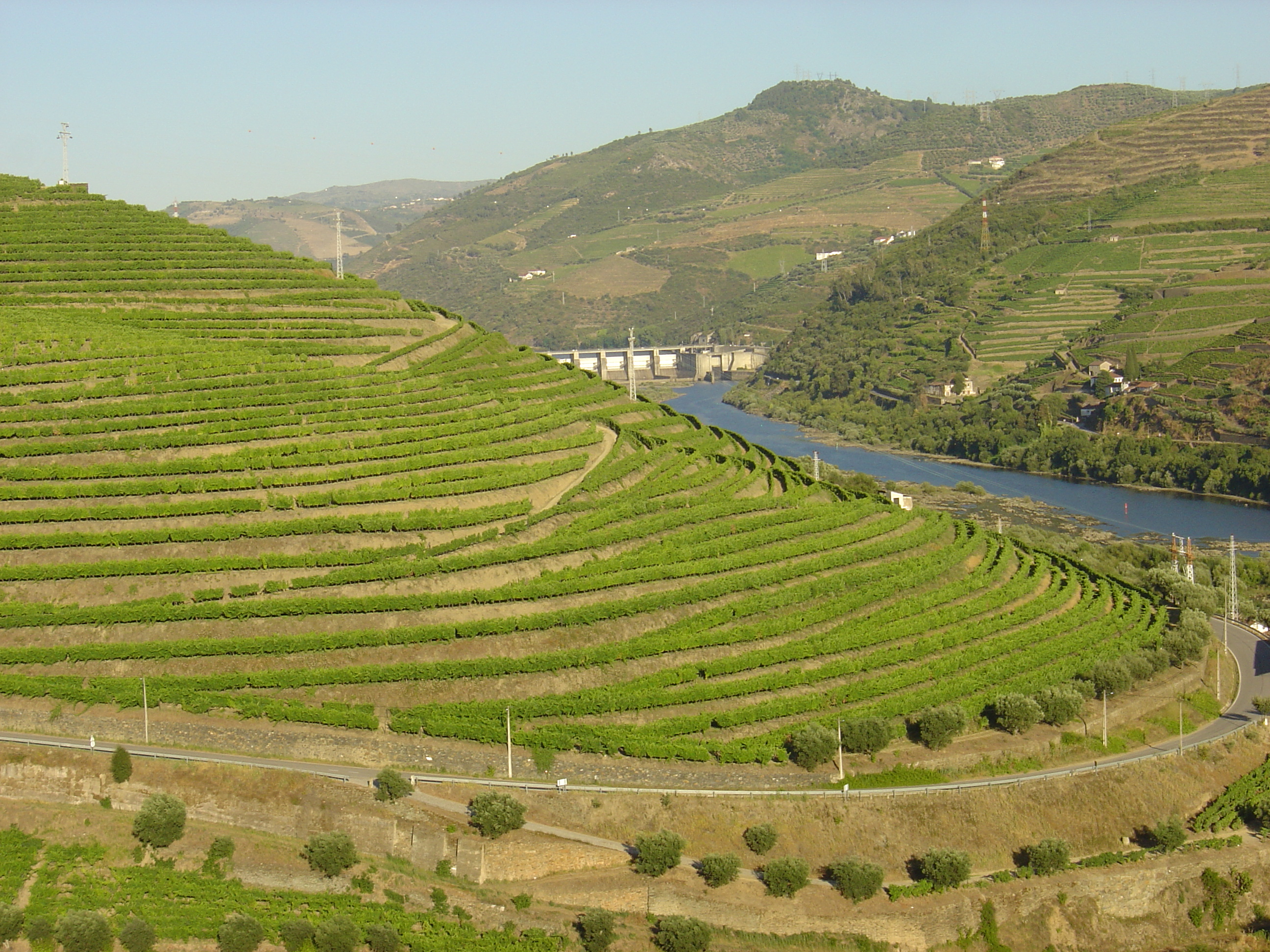
Terraced vineyards along the Douro river

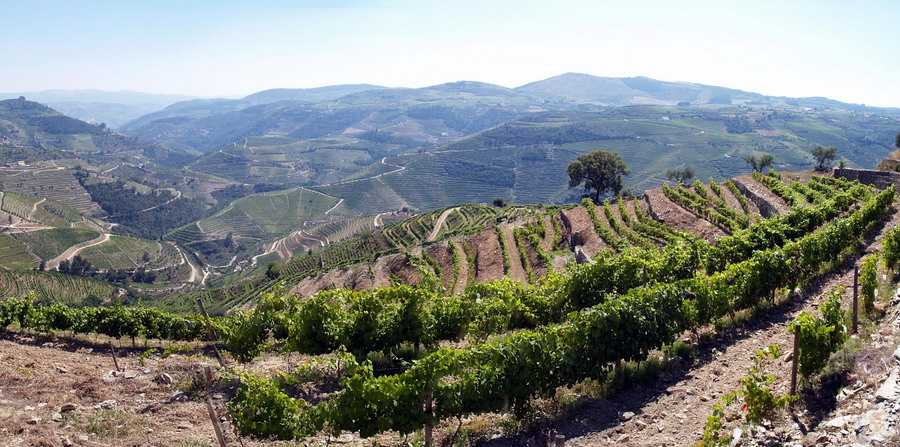
Vineyards in Alto Douro

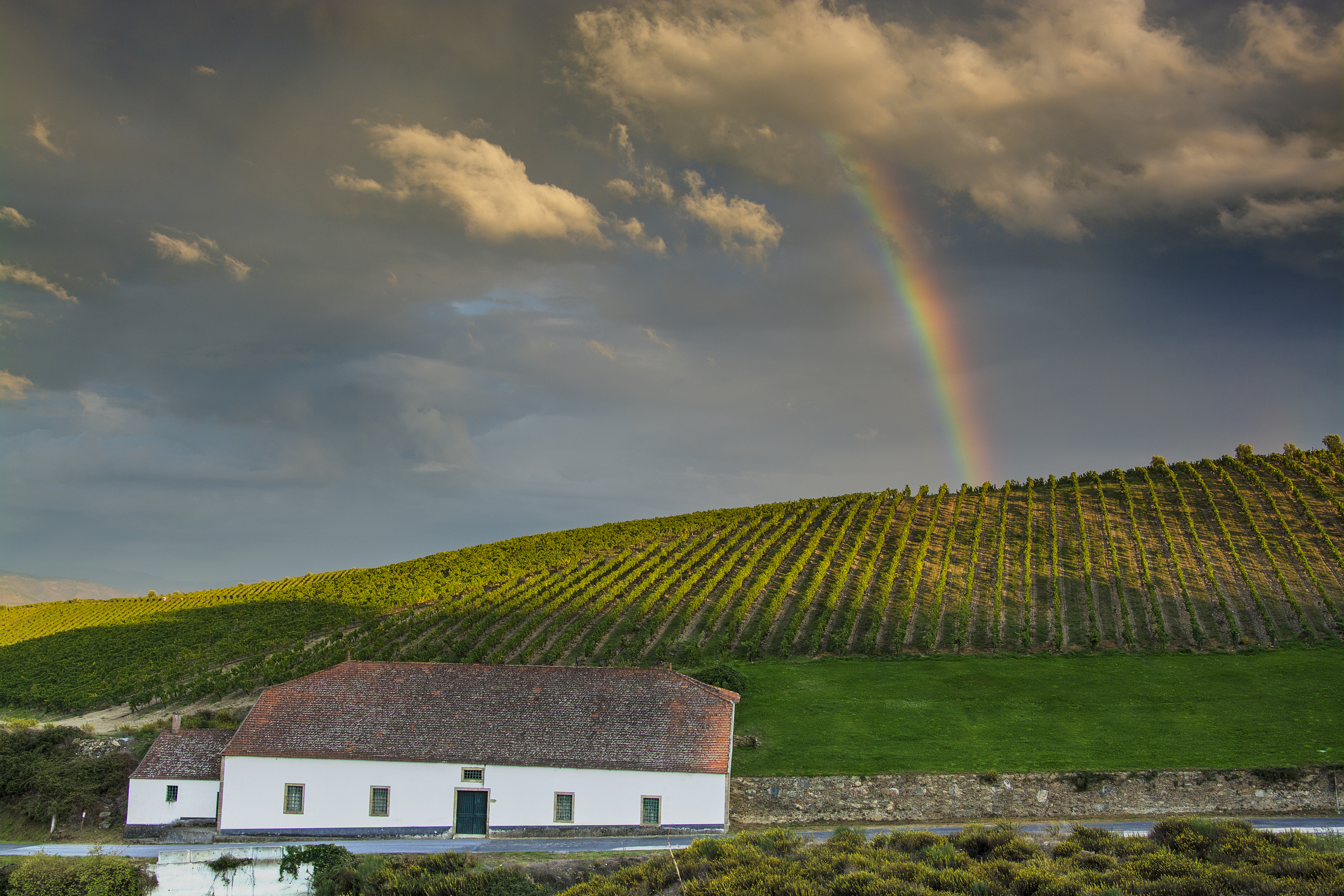
Vineyards in Alto Douro

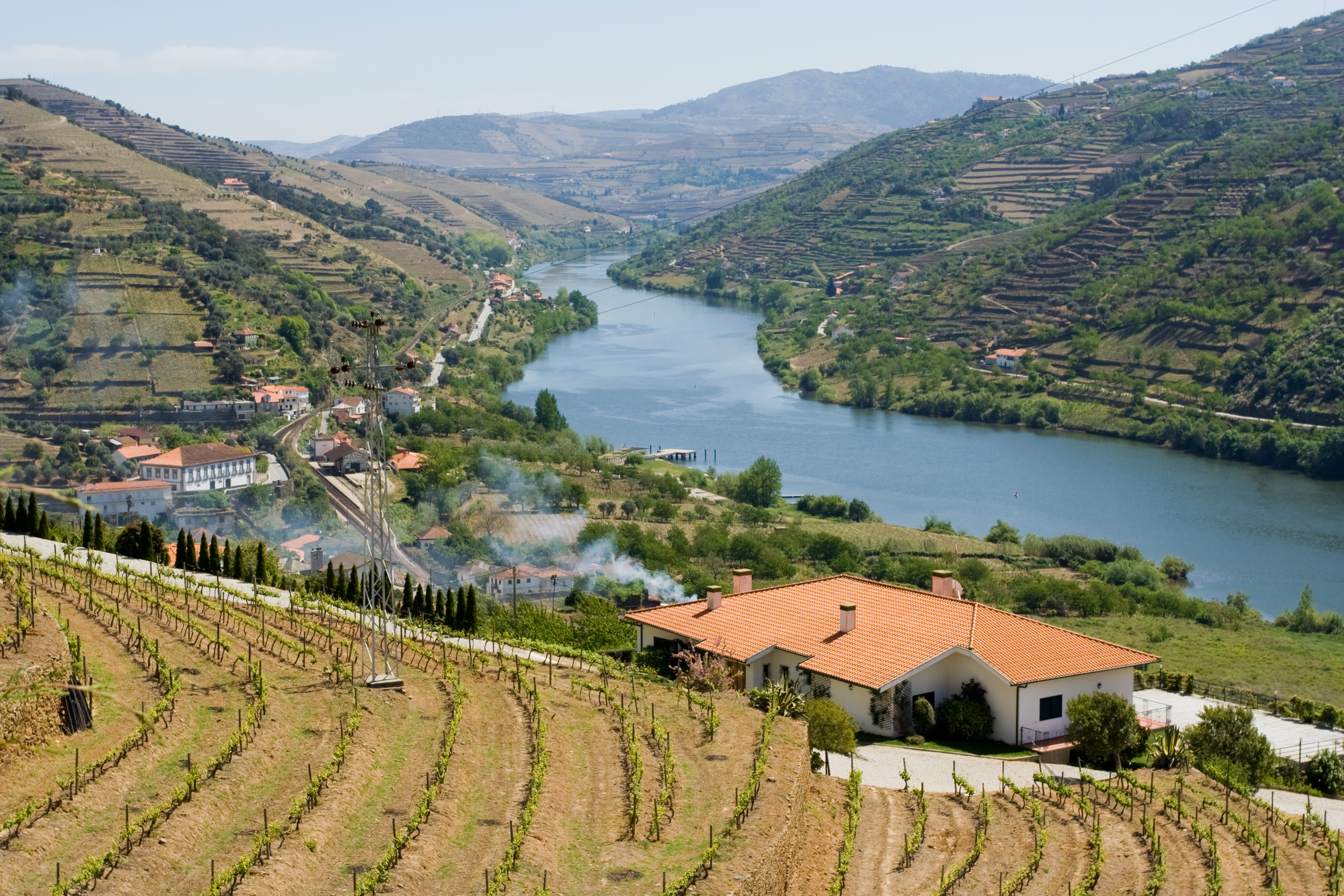
Douro Valley

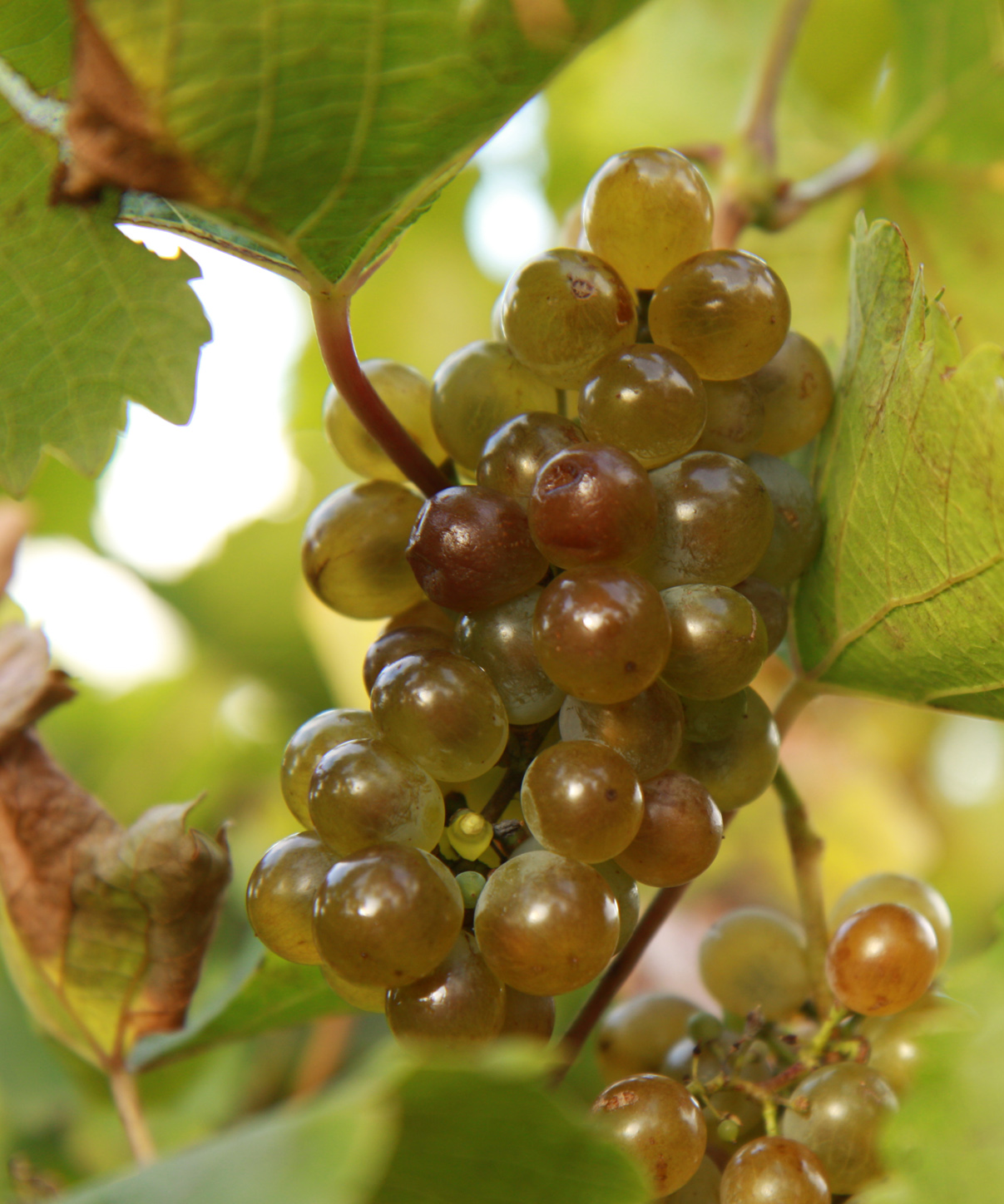
White grapes in Douro Valley

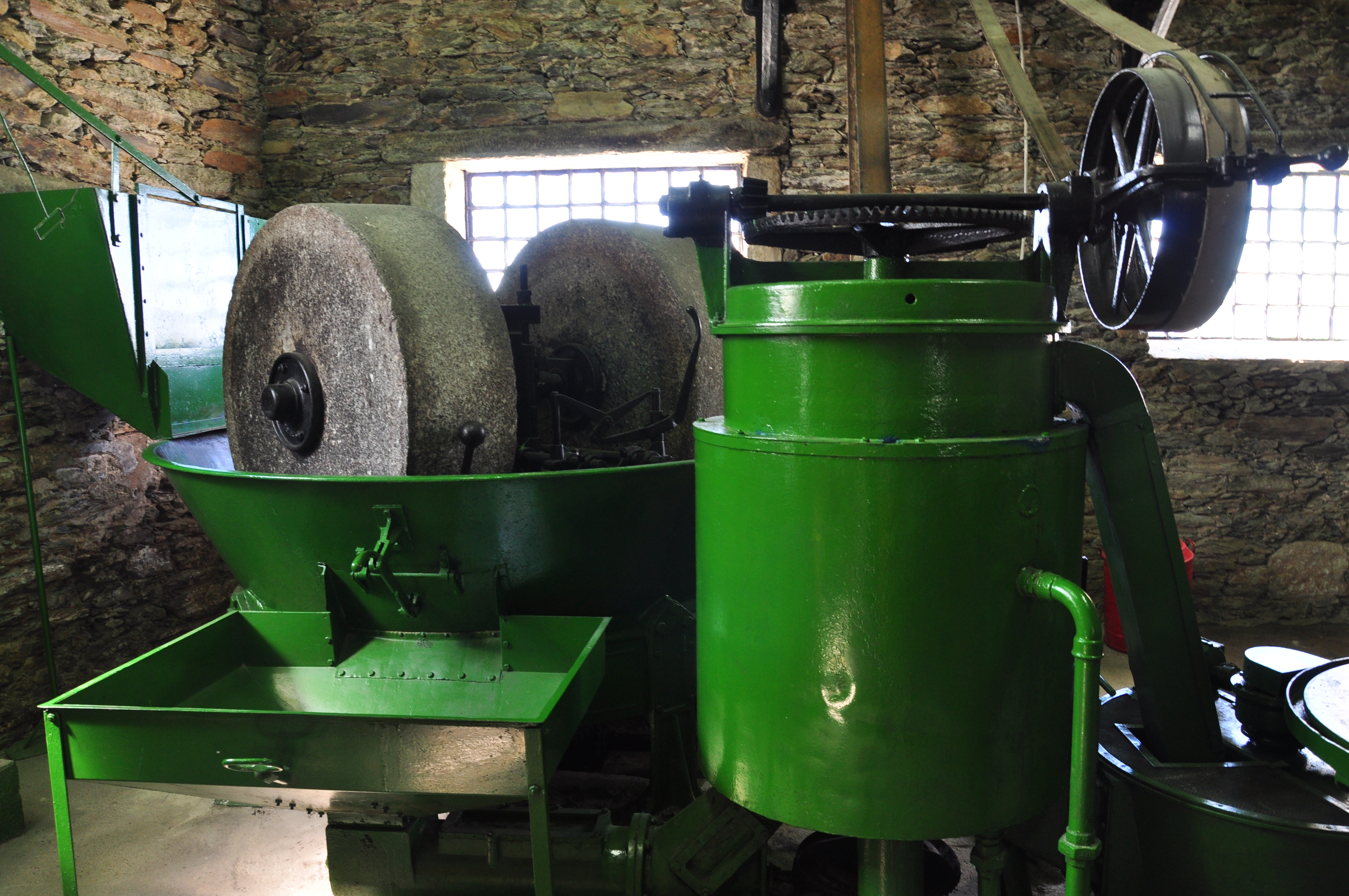
Wine Making

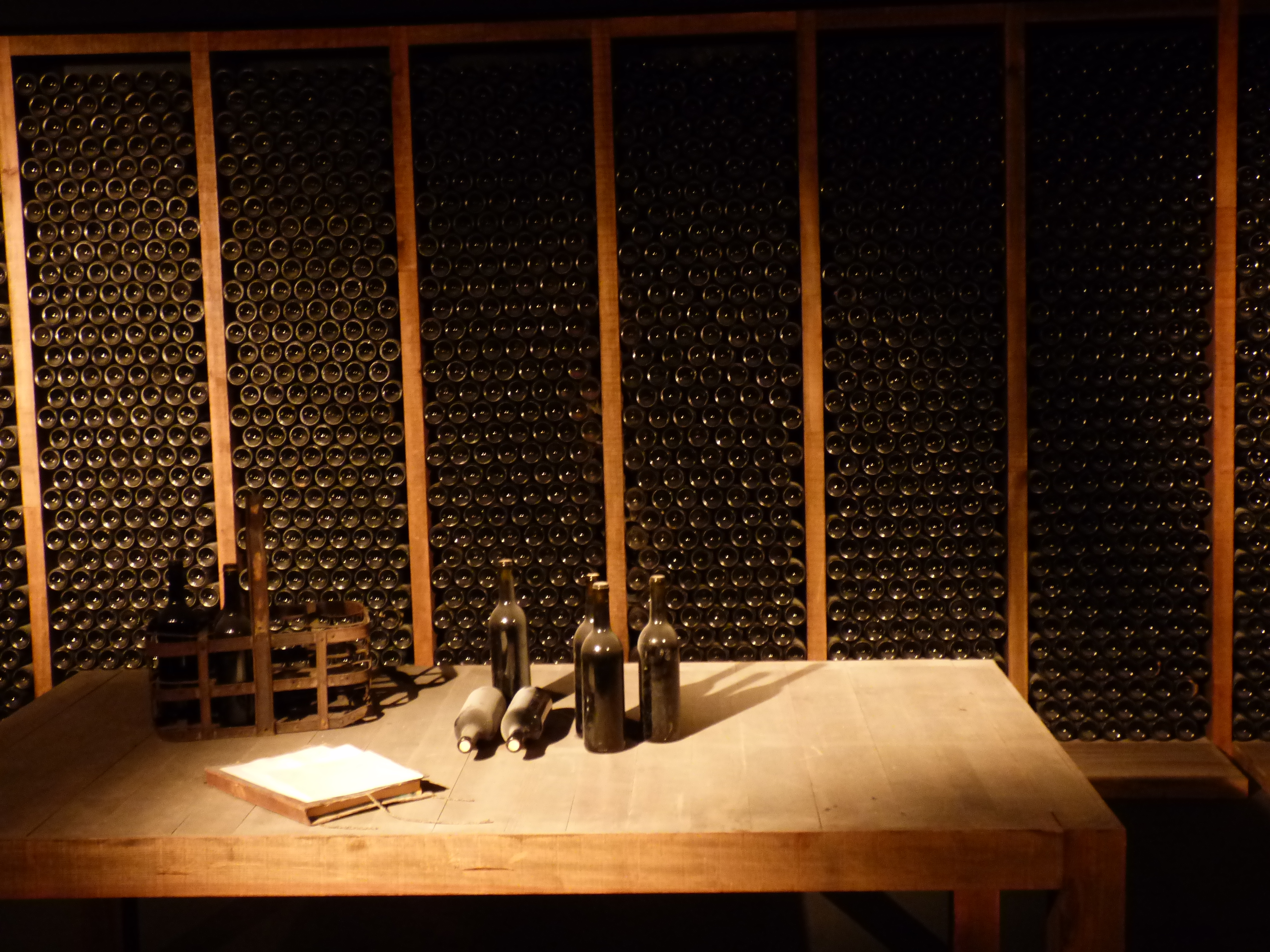
Wine Making

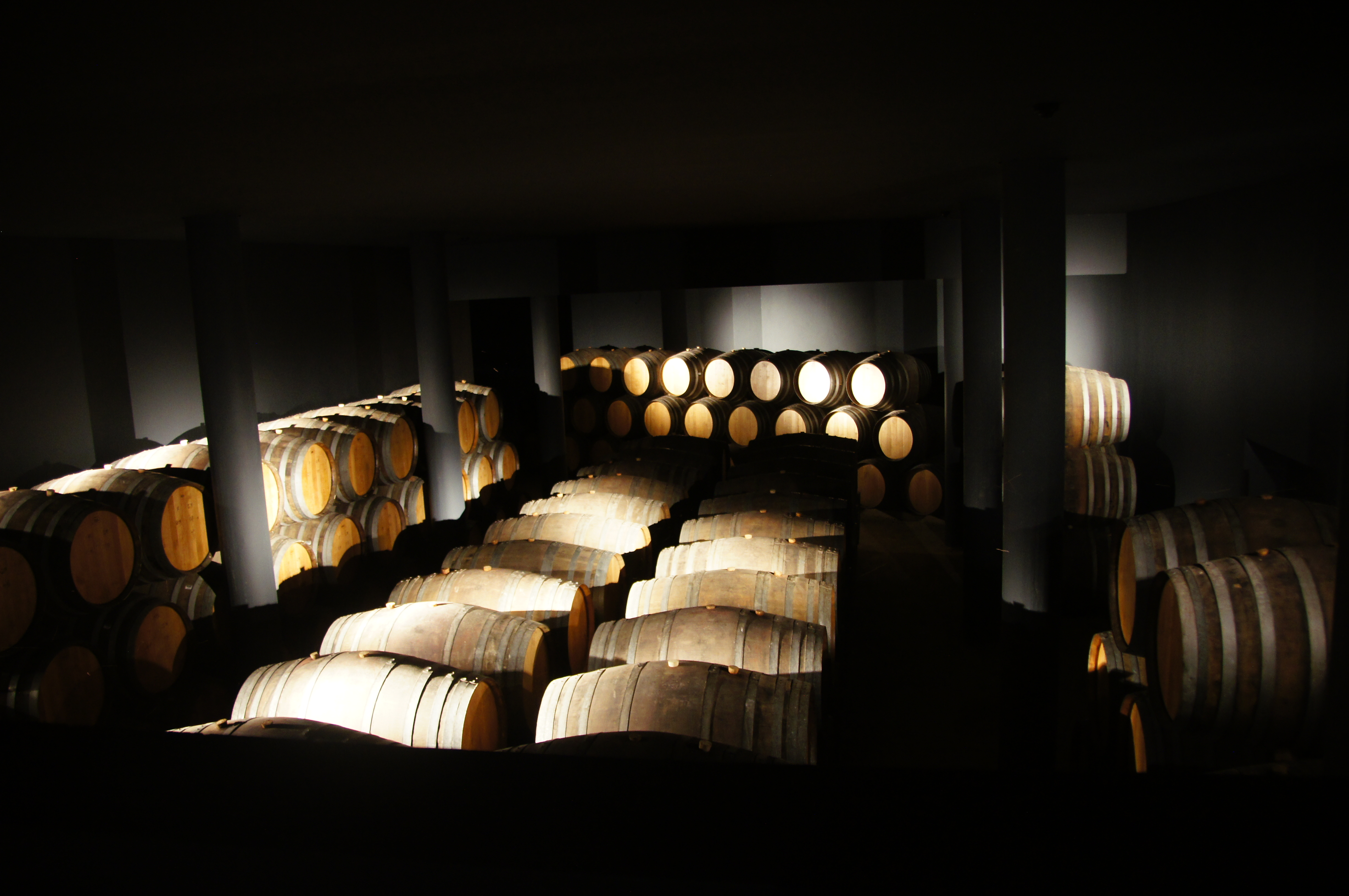
Wine Making

== See also ==
- List of Portuguese wine regions
- Duriense VR, a lower-level Vinho Regional designation for wine from the same area as Douro DOC
- Quinta classification of Port vineyards in the Douro
- Factory House
