= Bical (grape) =

Variety of grape

- Grape (Vitis)
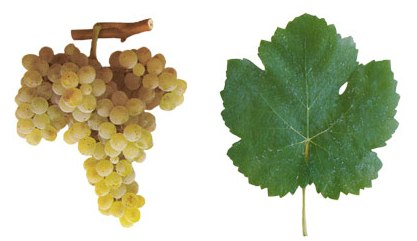
- Color of berry skin: Blanc
- Species: Vitis vinifera
- Also called: See list of synonyms
- Origin: Portugal
- Notable regions: Bairrada
- VIVC number: 1568

Bical is a white Portuguese wine grape planted primarily in the Bairrada region. It can produce high acid wines and is often used in sparkling wine production.

== Synonyms ==
Bical is also known under the synonyms Arinto de Alcobaça, Barrado das Moscas, Bical de Bairrada, Borrado das Moscas (in the Dao), Pintado das Moscas, and Pintado dos Pardais. Bical and Bical Tinto are also used as synonyms for Touriga Nacional.

== See also ==
- List of Portuguese grape varieties
