= Yambina =

Aboriginal Australian people in Queensland

The Yambina were an Aboriginal Australian people of the state of Queensland, whose traditional lands lie inland (westwards) some distance from Mackay.

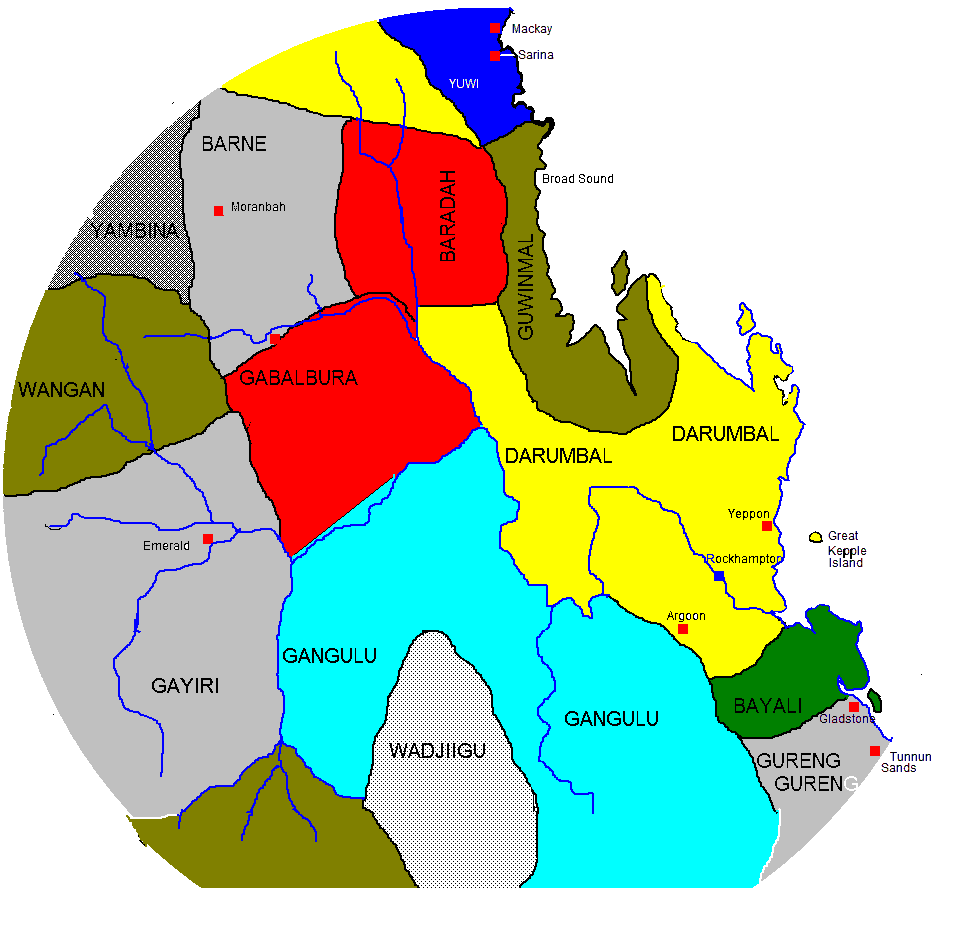
Traditional lands of Australian Aboriginal peoples in central Queensland

== Country ==
Yambina lands included Logan Creek south of Avon Downs. They ran east to the Denham Range and Logan Downs. The western extension lay around the area of Elgin Downs. They were also present at Solferino. Norman Tindale estimated their territory as circumscribing about 6,500 square kilometres (2,500 mi^{2}).

== Social organisation ==
The marriage rules governing the Yambina were set forth by Wilson and Murray, who discerned two classes, the Youngaroo and the Wootharoo.

== History of contact ==
Within a few decades of white settlement, it was estimated that the Yambina numbered 100.

== Language ==
The language of the Yambina people was Yambina, considered a dialect of the Biri language. No speakers of the language have been recorded since before 1975.

== Alternative names ==
AIATSIS' AUSTLANG lists:

- Jambina
- Jampa:l
- Jampal
- Muthoburra
- Mutholburra
- Narboo Murre
- Yambeena

== Some words ==
- wanday (tame dog)
- marrara or mowara (wild dog)
- yabboo (father)
- younga (nerra) (mother)
- meekooloo (white man)

== Sources ==
- "AIATSIS map of Indigenous Australia". AIATSIS. 14 May 2024.
- Muirhead, James (1887). "Belyando" (PDF). In Curr, Edward Micklethwaite (ed.). The Australian race: its origin, languages, customs, place of landing in Australia and the routes by which it spread itself over the continent. Vol. 3. Melbourne: J. Ferres. pp. 26–33.
- Tindale, Norman Barnett (1974). "Jambina (QLD)". Aboriginal Tribes of Australia: Their Terrain, Environmental Controls, Distribution, Limits, and Proper Names. Australian National University Press. ISBN 978-0-708-10741-6. Archived from the original on 20 January 2018.
- Wilson, Samuel; Murray, T. (1887). "Peak Downs District, Logan Downs Station." (PDF). In Curr, Edward Micklethwaite (ed.). The Australian race: its origin, languages, customs, place of landing in Australia and the routes by which it spread itself over the continent. Vol. 3. Melbourne: J. Ferres. pp. 64–69.
