= Baga (grape) =

Variety of grape

- Grape (Vitis)
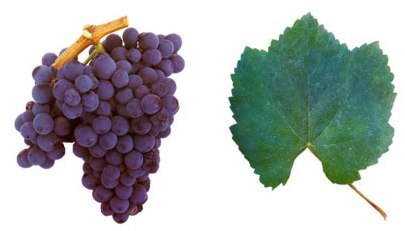
- Color of berry skin: Noir
- Species: Vitis vinifera
- Also called: see list of synonyms
- Origin: Portugal
- VIVC number: 885

Baga is a red Portuguese wine grape variety planted primarily in the Bairrada DOC. As a varietal, Baga produces tannic wines with high acidity.

== Synonyms ==
Baga is also known under the synonyms Baga de Louro, Baguinha, Bairrada, Bairrado Tinta, Baya, Carrasquenho, Carrega Burros, Goncalveira, Morete, Moreto, Paga Dividas, Poeirinha, Poeirinho, Povolide, Preiinho, Pretinho, Preto Rifete, Rifete, Rosete, Tinta Bairrada, Tinta Bairradina, Tinta da Bairrada, Tinta de Baga, and Tinta Fina.

== See also ==
- List of Portuguese grape varieties
