= Valle de la Orotava =

Spanish wine designation

Coordinates: 28°23′31″N 16°31′31″W

Valle de la Orotava DOP
- Wine region
- Valle de la Orotava DOP in the province of Santa Cruz de Tenerife in the region of the Canary Islands
- Official name: D.O.P. Valle de la Orotava
- Type: Denominación de Origen Protegida (DOP)
- Year established: 1995
- Country: Spain
- No. of vineyards: 329 hectares (813 acres)
- No. of wineries: 14
- Wine produced: 2,140 hectolitres
- Comments: Data for 2016 / 2017

Valle de la Orotava is a Spanish Denominación de Origen Protegida (DOP) for wines located on the north-western coastline of Tenerife, (Canary Islands, Spain), and acquired its DO in 1995.

== History ==
This area was one of the first one to plant vines when the Canary Islands were occupied by Spain in the 15th century. The area given over to vines has diminished steadily over during the course of the 20th century due to increasing competition from banana plantations.

== Geography ==
The vineyards are located on the fertile slopes of the Teide, a volcano, and extend down to the port of Puerto de la Cruz. There are 671 ha registered with the DO.

The Valle de la Orotava (Orotava Valley) is not strictly speaking a valley at all, but the local name for the lower slopes of the Teide. The vineyards are at an average height of around 800 m above sea-level.

== Soils ==
70% of the soil is volcanic, 20% clay and the remaining 10% is volcanic rock. The soils are light, permeable, rich in minerals and slightly acidic.

== Climate ==
The climate is hot and humid due to the influence of the Atlantic Ocean, with a high index of annual sunlight hours. Temperatures are high in summer and the vineyards are often shrouded in mist caused by the humidity bearing trade winds which blow all year round. This allows the vines to thrive though at times they are affected by sudden storms and strong gusts of wind.

== Authorised grape varieties ==
The authorised grape varieties are:

- Red: Castellana Negra, Listán Negro / Almuñeco, Malvasía Rosada, Negramoll, and Tintilla are preferred; also authorised are Bastardo Negro / Baboso Negro, Cabernet Sauvignon, Listán Prieto, Merlot, Moscatel Negro, Pinot Noir, Ruby Cabernet, Syrah, Tempranillo, and Vijariego Negro
- White: Albillo, Bermejuela / Marmajuelo, Forastera Blanca, Doradilla, Gual, Malvasía Volcánica, Malvasía Aromática, Moscatel de Alejandría, Sabro, Verdello, Vijariego / Diego are preferred; also authorised are Bastardo Blanco / Baboso Blanco, Breval, Burrablanca, Listán Blanco, Pedro Ximénez, Torrontés
