= La Gomera (DO) =

Coordinates: 28°10′50.2″N 17°15′55.4″W

La Gomera DOP
- Wine region
- La Gomera DOP in the province of Santa Cruz de Tenerife in the region of the Canary Islands
- Official name: D.O.P. La Gomera
- Type: Denominación de Origen Protegida (DOP)
- Year established: 2009
- Country: Spain
- No. of vineyards: 125 hectares (309 acres)
- No. of wineries: 17
- Wine produced: 469 hectolitres
- Comments: Data for 2016 / 2017

La Gomera is a Spanish Denominación de Origen Protegida (DOP) for wines that covers the entire island of La Gomera (Canary Islands, Spain) comprising the six municipalities of San Sebastián de la Gomera, Hermigua, Agulo, Vallehermoso, Valle Gran Rey and Alajeró. It obtained its official status in 2009.

== Climate and Geography ==
La Gomera is a very mountainous island and cultivation of vines is difficult and laborious. The vines are planted in terraces on steep slopes with walls built of stone. Traditionally the vines were left to grow along the ground, but vines have been trained along trellises (en espaldera).

== Vineyards and Wineries ==
There are currently (as of 2015) around 125 ha planted to vines and registered with the Regulatory Council of the DOP and around 150 grapegrowers and 7 wineries registered.

== Authorised Grape Varieties ==
The authorised grape varieties are:

- Red: Castellana Negra, Listán Negro, Malvasía Rosada, Negramoll, Listán Prieto, Tintilla, Bastardo Negro, Cabernet Sauvignon, Pinot Noir, Ruby Cabernet, Syrah, Tempranillo, Vijariego Negro, Merlot, Moscatel Negro
- White: Albillo, Bermejuela, Forastera Blanca, Gual, Doradilla, Malvasía Volcánica, Malvasía Aromática, Moscatel de Alejandría, Sabro, Verdello, Vijariego, Breval, Listán Blanco, Pedro Ximénez, Bastardo Blanco, Torrontés

The Regulatory Council also controls other criteria such as:

- Maximum authorized planning density: 4,000 vines/ha
- Maximum authorized must yield: 70%
