= Abona (DO) =

Coordinates: 28°9′57.2″N 16°30′7.4″W

Abona DOP
- Wine region
- Abona DOP in the province of Santa Cruz de Tenerife in the region of Canary Islands
- Official name: D.O.P. Abona
- Type: Denominación de Origen Protegida (DOP)
- Year established: 1996
- Country: Spain
- No. of vineyards: 898 hectares (2,219 acres)
- No. of wineries: 19
- Wine produced: 5,608 hectolitres
- Comments: Data for 2016 / 2017

Abona is a Spanish Denominación de Origen Protegida (DOP) for wines located on the southern coastline of Tenerife, (Canary Islands, Spain), and acquired its DO in 1996.

== Geography ==
The vineyards are planted at altitudes of between 200 m and 1,800 m on the slopes of the Teide, an extinct volcano and the highest mountain in Spain at 3,715 m.

== Soils ==
The soils on the lower slopes contain clay along with limestone and marl.

== Climate ==
Due to the height of the Teide mountain, there are numerous microclimates within the characteristic subtropical climate of the Canary islands. At sea level, the climate is hot and subtropical, very sunny with sporadic rainfall. Between 550 m and 1,200, at cloud level, the humidity is higher, rainfall more frequent and the temperatures are lower. Above the cloud level, the climate is much drier, greater contrast between night and day temperatures, snow is normal and minimum temperature can fall to −5 °C.

== Authorised grape varieties ==
The authorised grape varieties are:

- Red: Bastardo Negro, Listán Negro, Listán Prieto, Malvasía Rosada, Moscatel Negro, Negramoll, Tintilla, Vijariego Negro, Cabernet Sauvignon, Merlot, Pinot Noir, Ruby Cabernet, Syrah, Tempranillo, Castellana Negra
- White: Bastardo Blanco, Bermejuela, Forastera Blanca, Gual, Listán blanco de Canarias, Malvasía Aromática, Malvasía Volcánica, Moscatel de Alejandría, Pedro Ximénez, Sabro, Torrontés, Verdello, Vijariego, Albillo, and Doradilla

Traditionally the vines were planted as low bushes (en vaso) though newly planted vineyards tend to be on trellises (en espaldera).
