= Valle de Güímar =

Spanish wine designation

Coordinates: 28°18′38″N 16°24′47″W

Valle de Güímar DOP
- Wine region
- Valle de Güímar DOP in the province of Santa Cruz de Tenerife in the region of the Canary Islands
- Official name: D.O.P. Valle de Güímar
- Type: Denominación de Origen Protegida (DOP)
- Year established: 1996
- Country: Spain
- No. of vineyards: 160 hectares (395 acres)
- No. of wineries: 12
- Wine produced: 1,449 hectolitres
- Comments: Data for 2016 / 2017

Valle de Güímar is a Spanish Denominación de Origen Protegida (DOP) for wines located along the south-eastern coastline of Tenerife (Canary Islands, Spain), and acquired its DO in 1996.

== Geography ==
The vines are grown on the southern slopes of the Teide, a volcano, making it one of the highest winegrowing areas in Europe, between 175 m and 1,500 m above sea-level.

== Soils ==
There are three types of soil in the DOP: the lower altitude soils are sandy, the middle reaches are pumice-based and the higher slopes are clay.

== Climate ==
The climate in southern Tenerife is mild and temperate, with influence from the trade winds.

== Authorised grape varieties ==
The authorised grape varieties are:

- Red: Castellana Negra, Listán Negro / Almuñeco, Malvasía Rosada, Negramoll / Mulata, Tintilla, Bastardo Tinto / Baboso Negro, Cabernet Sauvignon, Listán Prieto, Merlot, Moscatel Negro, Pinot Noir, Ruby Cabernet, Syrah, Tempranillo, Vijariego Negro
- White: Albillo, Bermejuela / Marmajuelo, Forastera Blanca, Doradilla, Gual, Malvasía Volcánica, Malvasía Aromática, Moscatel de Alejandría, Sabro, Verdello, Vijariego / Diego, Burrablanca, Breval, Listán Blanco, Pedro Ximénez, Bastardo Blanco, Torrontés

The vines were traditionally planted as low bushes (en vaso) though newly planted vineyards tend to be on trellises (en espaldera).
