= Tacoronte-Acentejo =

Coordinates: 28°28′47″N 16°24′48″W

Tacoronte-Acentejo DOP
- Wine region
- Tacoronte-Acentejo DOP in the province of Santa Cruz de Tenerife in the region of the Canary Islands
- Official name: D.O.P. Tacoronte-Acentejo
- Type: Denominación de Origen Protegida (DOP)
- Year established: 1992
- Country: Spain
- No. of vineyards: 1,017 hectares (2,513 acres)
- No. of wineries: 31
- Wine produced: 6,501 hectolitres
- Comments: Data for 2016 / 2017

Tacoronte-Acentejo is a Spanish Denominación de Origen Protegida (DOP) for wines located in the Anaga Peninsula on the northeastern coast of the island of Tenerife (Canary Islands, Spain). It was the first region in the Canary Islands to acquire DO status, in 1992. It covers the municipalities of Santa Cruz de Tenerife, San Cristóbal de La Laguna, El Rosario, Tegueste, Tacoronte, El Sauzal, La Matanza de Acentejo, La Victoria de Acentejo and Santa Úrsula.

Covering around 1,000 ha, it is the largest DOP on Tenerife and represents 40% of the total cultivated land area and 20% of the vineyards of the island.

== Geography ==
The vineyards are located at elevations of between 100 m and 1,000 m above sea level. They are planted on terraces on very steep hillsides facing north and looking over the sea.

== Soils ==
The vines are planted in very fertile soil which is reddish. The soil is poor in carbonates but rich in organic matter and minerals, especially nitrogen, potassium and phosphorus. The subsoil is volcanic in origin.

== Climate ==
The Atlantic Ocean provides a humid climate with mild temperatures and frequent mists. It is basically a Mediterranean climate influenced by the orientation of the island and the steel slopes, which gives rise to a great variety of microclimates. The prevailing trade winds are mild and humid.

Frost is unknown on the island, but hail, strong winds and occasional heatwaves represent risks for grape-growers.

== Authorised Grape Varieties ==
The authorised grape varieties are:

- Red: Listán Negro, Negramoll, Malvasía Rosada, Castellana Negra, Moscatel Negro, Cabernet Sauvignon, Merlot, Pinot Noir, Ruby Cabernet, Syrah, Tempranillo, Bastardo Tinto, Listán Prieto, Vijariego Negro
- White: Gual, Malvasía Volcánica, Malvasía Aromática, Doradilla, Bermejuela, Verdello, Moscatel de Alejandría, Vijariego, Forastera Blanca, Albillo, Sabro, Listán Blanco, Pedro Ximénez, Torrontés, Bastardo Blanco, Breval, Burrablanca

Traditionally the vines were planted as low bushes (en vaso) though newly planted vineyards tend to be on trellises (en espaldera). The maximum authorized planting density is 3,000 vines/ha. In practice, the yield is significantly lower than the authorised maximum.
