= La Palma (DO) =

Spanish wine designation

Coordinates: 28°29′35.2″N 17°50′44.4″W

La Palma DOP
- Wine region
- La Palma DOP in the province of Santa Cruz de Tenerife in the region of the Canary Islands
- Official name: D.O.P. La Palma
- Type: Denominación de Origen Protegida (DOP)
- Year established: 1994
- Country: Spain
- No. of vineyards: 585 hectares (1,446 acres)
- No. of wineries: 17
- Wine produced: 2,981 hectolitres
- Comments: Data for 2016 / 2017

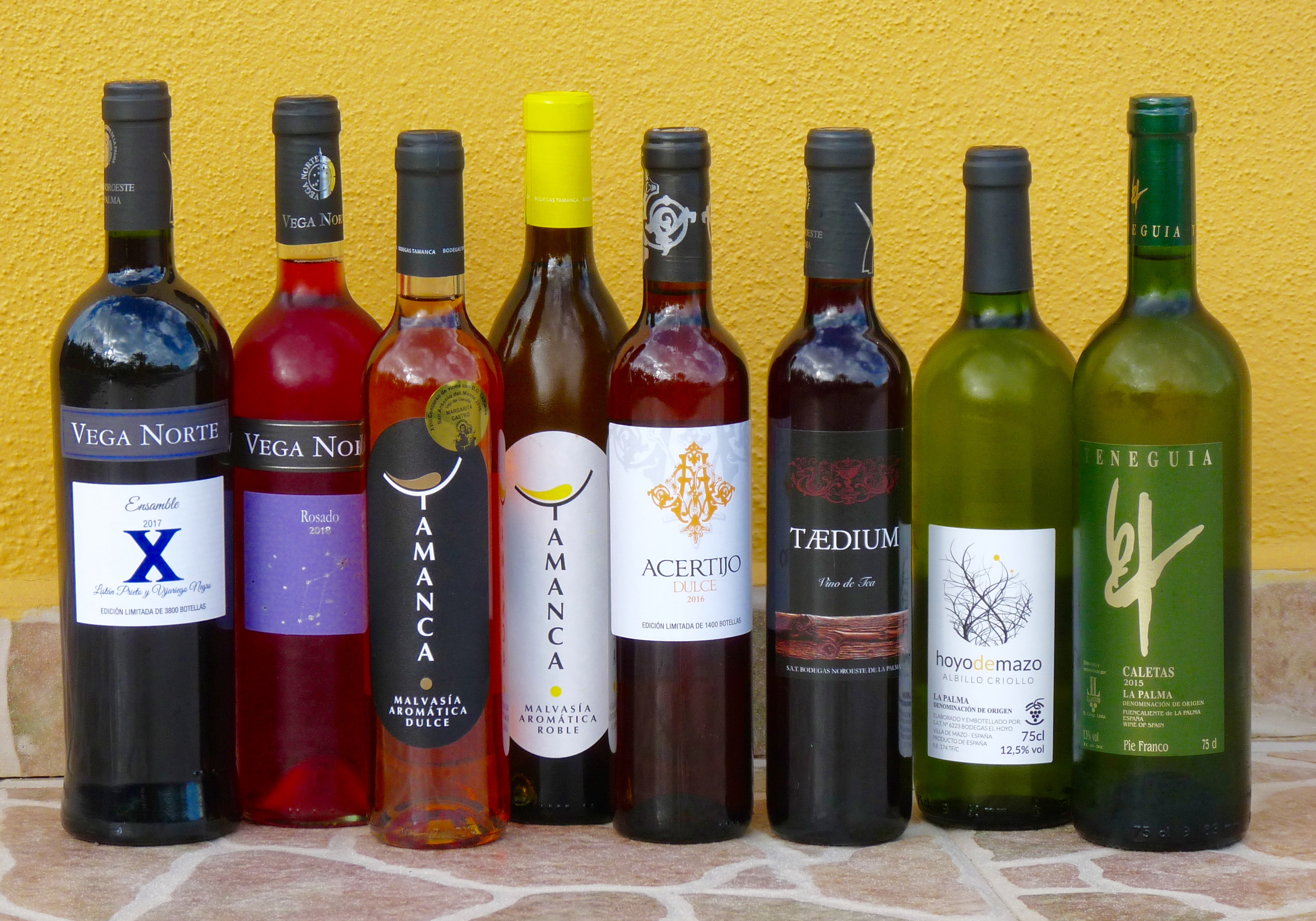
Wine from La Palma

La Palma is a Spanish Denominación de Origen Protegida (DOP) for wines that covers the entire island of La Palma, in the Canary Islands, Spain. It acquired its DO in 1994. There are around 600 ha of vineyards registered with the DOP, planted in a strip along the coast, though the altitude can vary between 200 m and 1,500 m above sea-level. The DOP is divided into three sub-zones.

- Hoyo de Mazo, covering the municipalities of Villa de Mazo, Breña Baja, Breña Alta and Santa Cruz de la Palma, in the high central part of the island
- Fuencaliente, covering Fuencaliente, El Paso, Los Llanos de Aridane and Tazacorte, is located in the south of the island
- Norte de la Palma, covering Puntallana, San Andrés y Sauces, Barlovento, Garafía, Puntagorda and Tijarafe, is located in the north of the island

== Geography and soils ==
The soils are rich and fertile and lie over volcanic rock. In some areas they are covered with a layer of volcanic sand. The soils are light, permeable and rich in mineral nutrients with a slightly acidic pH level.

== Climate ==
The climate is temperate and sub-tropical. Mean annual rainfall is 400 mm, though there is a significant difference between the north and south of the island on the one hand and the centre. Wind and storms occasionally cause slight damage to the vines.

== Authorised grape varieties ==
The authorised grape varieties are:

- Red: Listán Negro, Bastardo Tinto, Malvasía Rosada, Moscatel Negro, Listán Prieto, Negramoll, Tintilla, Vijariego Negro, Cabernet Sauvignon, and Castellana Negra
- Albillo Criollo, Bastardo Blanco, Bermejuela, Vijariego, Doradilla, Burrablanca, Forastera Blanca, Gual, Listán Blanco, Malvasía Aromática, Moscatel de Alejandría, Pedro Ximénez, Sabro, Torrontés, Verdello
