= Canarian cuisine =

Culinary traditions of the Canary Islands

The cuisine of the Canary Islands draws influence from the Americas, North Africa, and Latin America, as well as the aboriginal inhabitants of the islands (Guanches). It has influenced Latin American cuisine (after the 20th century Canarian migration to Latin America).

The island's subtropical climate supports the cultivation of fruits, nuts, and grains. Goats supply meat and cheeses, including the local soft cheese almogrote. Among the best known dishes include porridge made from the local wheat gofio, and papas arrugadas, a dish of boiled potatoes dressed in the spicy sauce mojo.

== Sauces and appetizers ==
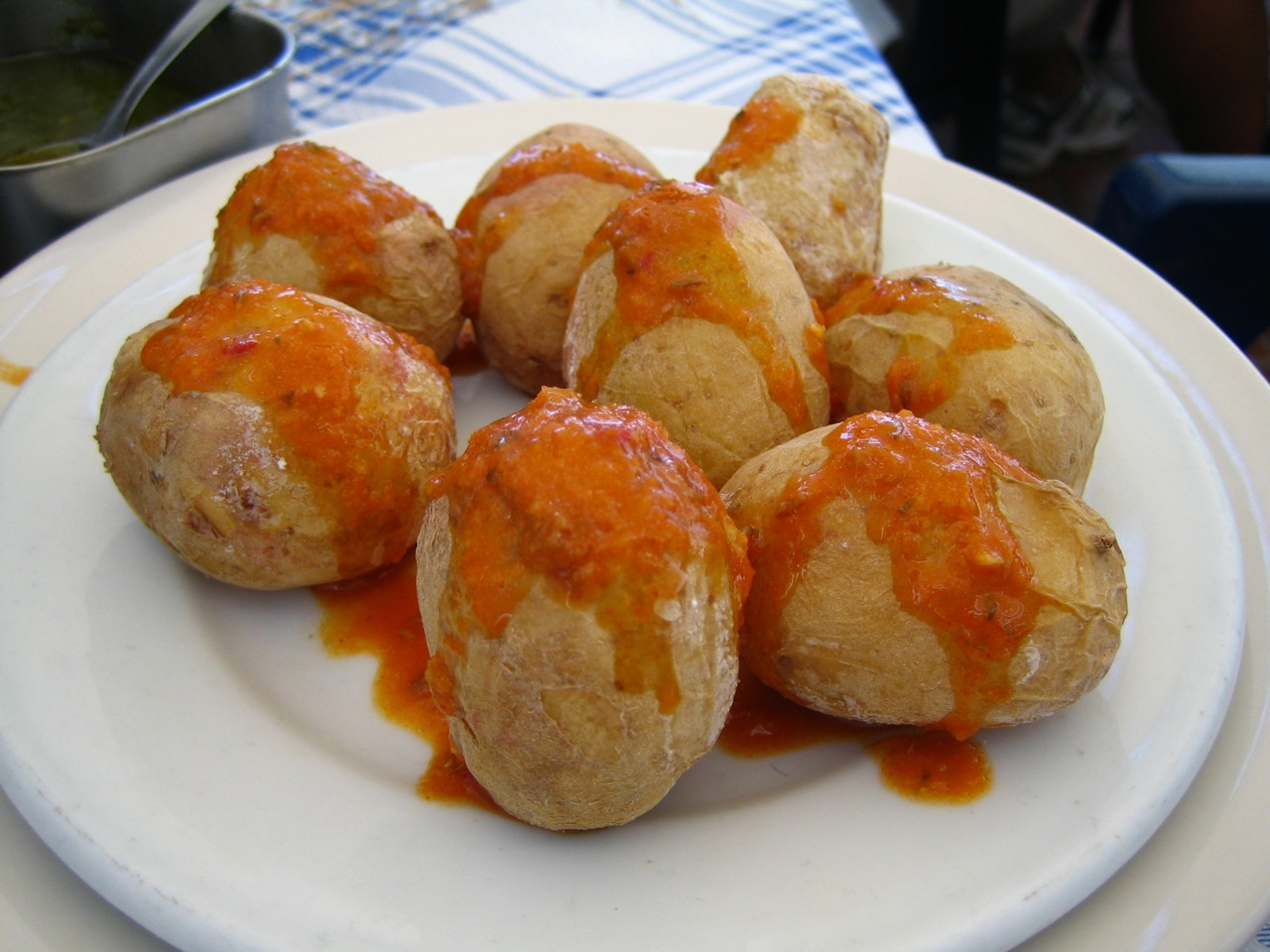
Papas arrugadas with mojo.

Many small dishes are presented in the Canary Islands as appetizers, or snacks (tapas), which are known locally as enyesques.

Mojo (pronounced mO-ho) is a sauce served with many dishes, which is made mainly of oil, garlic, vinegar, salt, red pepper, thyme, cumin, coriander and several other spices. The two main kinds are mojo rojo (red, often served with meat) and mojo verde (green, often served with fish), though both can be served with potatoes. The spicy red type is called mojo picón. This recipe is the base of the mojos of Latin America, especially Cuba, Dominican Republic, Puerto Rico, and Venezuela, due to heavy Canarian emigration, and have also influenced the cuisines of the non-Hispanic Caribbean islands.

Papas arrugadas (literally, "wrinkly potatoes") are small unskinned potatoes which have been boiled in salt water and served with mojo.

One very typical Canarian product is gofio, a flour created by grinding roasted sweetcorn, which used to be the staple food for the local population for centuries. Gofio is produced locally and is added to many foods. For instance, it can be mixed with warm milk to be drunk in the morning, as well as made into a dough-like food called pella that can be eaten alongside meals. Gofio can also be stirred with fish broth and onions to create a dish called gofio escaldado or escaldón de gofio.

Local varieties of cheese are popular and numerous, specially goat cheese. Cheeses from both La Palma and Fuerteventura are protected by the Denominación de Origen label. Other notable cheeses are the Flor de Guía cheese and the queso tierno (tender cheese). Hard cheese is made into a paste called Almogrote on La Gomera island. Grilled cheese with mojo is sometimes served as a starter.

== First courses ==
Traditional Canarian meals usually start with soup, in order to prepare the stomach for the meal. Among the best-known soups are:

- Potaje is a kind of chunky vegetable soup with potatoes, one of the main ways Canarian people consume vegetables. Ingredients can vary largely, depending on the island. One of the most popular is the potaje de berros (watercress soup). They can be machine-blended into purees, more suitable for children.
- Caldo de papas (potato soup) is a humble soup made mainly of potatoes and coriander.
- Caldo de pescado (fish soup) usually features popular fish of the islands, like the mero (grouper), sama (common dentex) and cherne (wreckfish).
- Rancho canario is a soup with chickpeas, lard, thick noodles, potatoes and meat.

== Fish ==
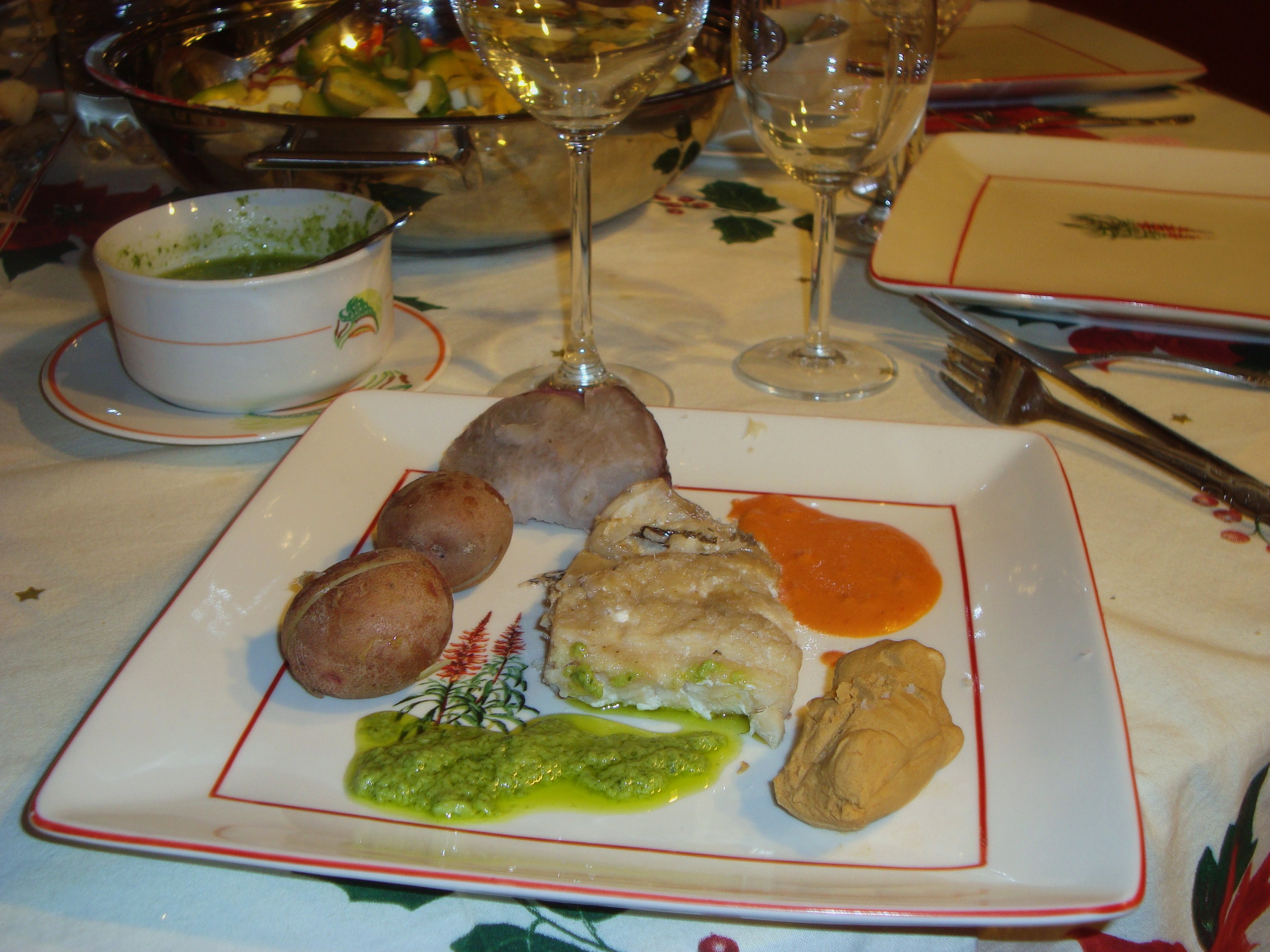
Sancocho canario with dried and cooked wreckfish, potatoes, sweet potatoes, mojo and gofio

Waters around the Canary Islands are rich with a great variety of autochthonous fish. These can be prepared in many ways, including oven-roasted (sometimes covered in a salt bed), fried, and marinated in various sauces. Some preparations include:

- Sancocho canario, boiled fish with potatoes, sweet potatoes, gofio and mojo. In Tenerife, it is served in a pot.
- Pescado seco (dry fish), which can include tollos (school shark strips served with sauce) and jareas (open and dried fish, similar to bacalhau, that are often eaten roasted).

== Meats ==
The most widely consumed meats are pork, chicken, rabbit and goat.

- Puchero canario is a meat-rich soup which is the Canarian equivalent to Spanish cocidos. Chicken, beef and pork meat are combined with chickpeas, corn cobs, sweet potatoes, potatoes and other vegetables (such as carrot and cabbage).
- Goat meat has been eaten in the islands since pre-Spanish times.
- Ropa vieja (literally, 'old clothes') is a dish consisting of chicken and beef mixed with potatoes and garbanzos (chickpeas). Canarian ropa vieja is the father of Cuban ropa vieja through Canarian emigration.
- Conejo en salmorejo is a traditional rabbit stew marinated in coriander sauce (not to be confused with mainland Spain's salmorejo).
- Pork is the main ingredient of dishes such as carne fiesta (literally, 'party meat') and costillas con piña (ribs with corn cobs).

== Sweets and desserts ==
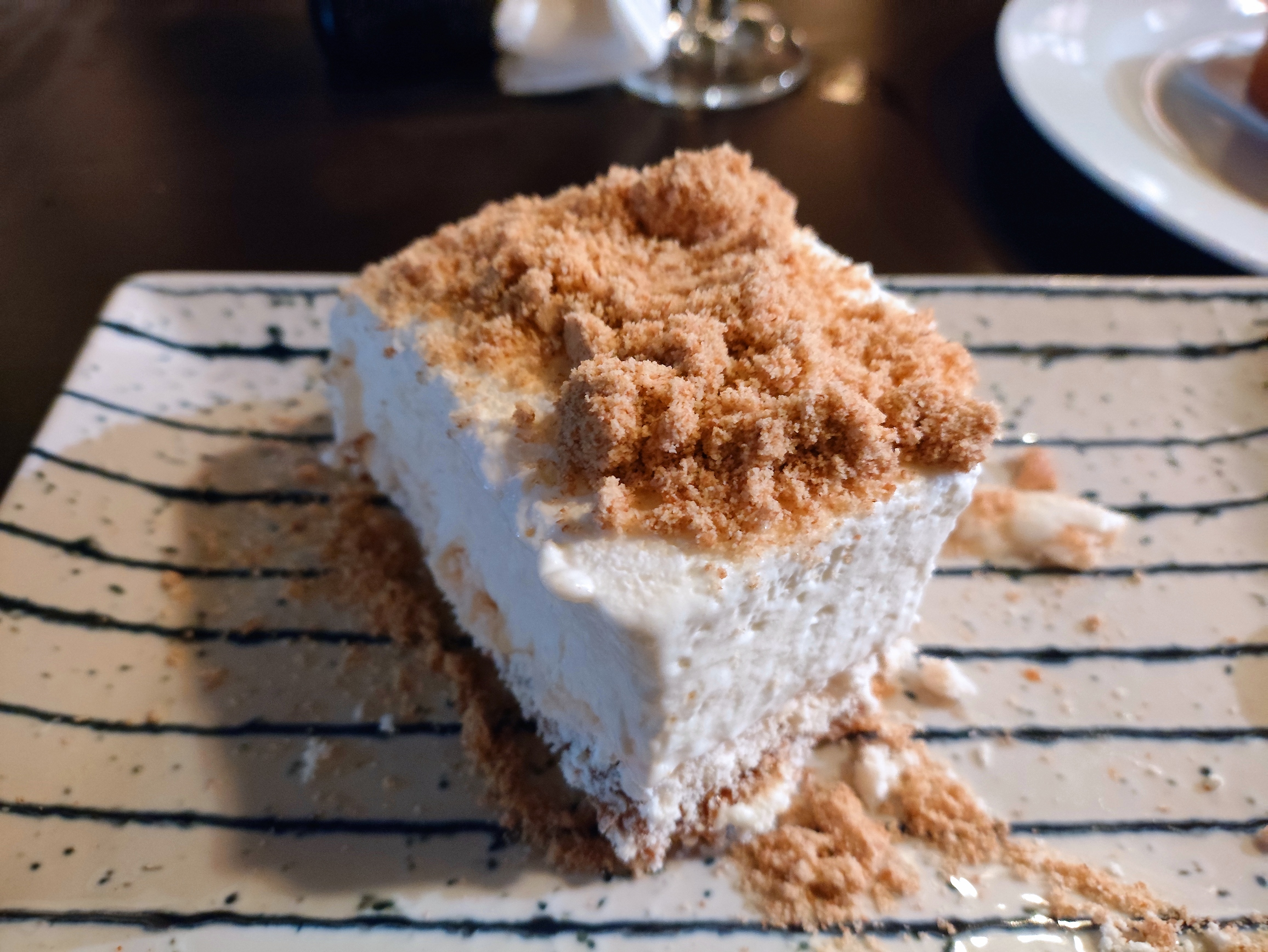
Polvito Uruguayo in Fuerteventura

Canarian desserts often use simple ingredients, such as cane sugar, honey, matalahuga or matalauva (anise), almonds and traditional miel de palma (especially on the island of La Palma). Among the desserts are bienmesabe (literally, a contraction of the Spanish phrase that means 'tastes good to me'), which is a paste of almonds, honey and sugar often served with ice cream or cream and cat's tongue cookies. Frangollo is a mix of corn flour, sugar, almonds and raisins, while truchas are pastries (filled with sweet potato paste or cabell d'angel, for instance) that are prepared at Christmastime. Polvito Uruguayo is a layered dessert served in a glass or in standalone cake style. It is made from layers of crumbed biscuits, whipped cream, dulce de leche, ground almonds and ground meringues, with proportions of layers highly variable, and some of the ingredients not always present.

In El Hierro there is a cake named quesadilla which is made with cheese. Other specialities include rosquetes (ring-shaped fried pastries), quesillo (tender cheese cake), rapaduras (cane sugar candy), Príncipe Alberto (chocolate cake from La Palma) and leche asada (milk cake). Gofio is also employed in some desserts such as huevos mole, pella de gofio (milk and gofio patty) and mousse de gofio (gofio cream).

Tropical fruits, especially bananas, are widely grown and consumed in the islands, even if they are not native species.

== Wines and liquors ==
The wine from the malvasia grape was a product of Canarian export since the 17th century, immediately after the decline of sugar plantations and until its commerce was blocked by the British Royal Navy in the late 18th century. Nowadays the islands produce ten protected geographical indications. Among the traditional winemaking practices, La Palma is notable for its unique vino de tea, where wines are aged in containers made from Canary Island Pine heartwood, representing an important example of preserved cultural heritage and traditional fermentation techniques.

Canarian Denominación de Origen wines are:

Canarian Denominación de Origen wines.

- Abona (Tenerife)
- Tacoronte-Acentejo (Tenerife)
- Valle de Güímar (Tenerife)
- Valle de La Orotava (Tenerife)
- Ycoden-Daute-Isora (Tenerife)
- El Hierro
- Lanzarote
- La Palma
- La Gomera
- Gran Canaria

Licor 43 is not made on the Canary Islands, but is an ingredient commonly used to make the barraquito/zaperoco, a multilayered drink made of Licor 43, coffee, condensed milk and frothed milk.
