= Ycoden-Daute-Isora =

Spanish wine region certificate

Coordinates: 28°22′28″N 16°39′20″W

Ycoden-Daute-Isora DOP
- Wine region
- Ycoden-Daute-Isora DOP in the province of Santa Cruz de Tenerife in the region of the Canary Islands
- Official name: D.O.P. Ycoden-Daute-Isora
- Type: Denominación de Origen Protegida (DOP)
- Year established: 1994
- Country: Spain
- No. of vineyards: 161 hectares (398 acres)
- No. of wineries: 11
- Wine produced: 1,170 hectolitres
- Comments: Data for 2016 / 2017

Ycoden-Daute-Isora is a Spanish Denominación de Origen Protegida (DOP) for wines located in the western part of the island of Tenerife (Canary Islands, Spain). It acquired its DO status in 1994.

== Geography ==
This DOPP covers nine municipalities including the town of Icod de los Vinos in the north and Guía de Isora in the south. The vineyards are located on the slopes of the Teide, a volcano, at altitudes of between 50 m and 1,500 m above sea-level.

== Soils ==
The vines are planted on many different types of soil though the most common have a significant volcanic ash and rock content. Along the coast they are mainly sandy and volcanic while inland they contain more volcanic material and sandy clay.

== Climate ==
The climate in the DOP area is one of the hottest in Tenerife, yet the winter temperatures fall low enough for frost to form. Rainfall is relatively high on the western facing slopes of the Teide. Between the months of May and August the trade winds provide humidity. Storms are not frequent but may cause occasional damage in the vineyards.

- Maximum summer temperature: 42.5 °C
- Minimum winter temperature: 4.5 °C
- Mean annual rainfall: 540 mm
- Mean annual sunlight: 3,190 hrs

== Authorised Grape Varieties ==
The authorised grape varieties are:

- Red: Tintilla, Listán Negro, Malvasía Rosada, Negramoll, Castellana Negra, Bastardo Negro / Baboso Negro, Moscatel Negro, and Vijariego Negro
- White: Bermejuela / Marmajuelo, Gual, Malvasía Volcánica, Malvasía Aromática, Moscatel de Alejandría, Pedro Ximénez, Verdello, Vijariego, Albillo, Bastardo Blanco / Baboso Blanco, Forastera Blanca, Listán Blanco, Sabro, Torrontés

The maximum production authorized by the DOP Regulatory Council is 10,000 kg/ha, and the maximum authorized yield from the must is 74%.
