= Lanzarote (DO) =

Coordinates: 29°00′06″N 13°38′43″W

Lanzarote DOP
- Wine region
- Lanzarote DOP in the province of Las Palmas in the region of the Canary Islands
- Official name: D.O.P. Lanzarote
- Type: Denominación de Origen Protegida (DOP)
- Year established: 1994
- Country: Spain
- Sub-regions: La Geria, San Bartolomé/Tías, Tinajo and Haría-Ye
- No. of vineyards: 1,849 hectares (4,569 acres)
- No. of wineries: 19
- Wine produced: 4,330 hectolitres
- Comments: Data for 2016 / 2017

Lanzarote is a Spanish Denominación de Origen Protegida (DOP) for wines that covers the entire island of Lanzarote, in the Canary Islands, Spain. It acquired its DO in 1994, and there are currently around 1,800 ha under cultivation.

There are four subzones:

- La Geria, the largest and located in the south
- San Bartolomé/Tías (Masdache), in the centre
- Tinajo, in the centre-west
- Haría-Ye, in the north

== Geography and soils ==
Lanzarote, the easternmost island in the Canary Islands has a unique and spectacular landscape in that the centre of the island is covered by solidified black lava (from a volcanic eruption in 1730–36). This means that nothing can grow there, but around the edges of this mass of lava, conditions are ideal for vines due to the presence of a layer of volcanic ash, known as lapilli or picón. This layer of ash allows quick absorption of rain, prevents it from evaporating, and helps to maintain constant the temperature of the soil underneath.

The vines are planted in holes or ditches so that their roots can reach the soil under the ash. Each hole or ditch is surrounded by a stone wall to protect the vine from the winds.

== Climate ==
Lanzarote, being the island closest to Africa, is affected by the continent's dry subtropical climate. Frost is unknown on the island. The sea breezes provide a temperate maritime climate. The mean temperatures range from 16 °C to 34 °C. Rainfall is very low (200 mm) and irregular throughout the year.

== Authorised grape varieties ==
The authorised grape varieties are:

- Red: Listán Negra / Almuñeco, Negramoll / Mulata, Malvasía Rosada, and Tintilla are preferred; also authorised are Bastardo Negro / Baboso Negro, Cabernet Sauvignon, Merlot, Moscatel Negro, Pinot Noir, Ruby Cabernet, Syrah, Tempranillo, Vijariego Negro
- White: Malvasía Volcánica, Moscatel de Alejandría, Vijariego / Diego, Albillo, Gual, Verdello are preferred; also authorised are Listán Blanco, Burrablanca, Breval Blanca, Pedro Ximénez, Torrontés
