= Gran Canaria (DO) =

Spanish wine denomination

Coordinates: 28°1′56.2″N 15°29′49.4″W

Gran Canaria DOP
- Wine region
- Gran Canaria DOP in the province of Las Palmas in the region of the Canary Islands
- Official name: D.O.P. Gran Canaria
- Type: Denominación de Origen Protegida (DOP)
- Year established: 2009
- Country: Spain
- No. of vineyards: 231 hectares (571 acres)
- Wine produced: 2,205 hectolitres
- Comments: Data for 2016 / 2017

Gran Canaria is a Spanish Denominación de Origen Protegida (DOP) that covers the entire island of Gran Canaria (Canary Islands, Spain) comprising 21 municipalities. It obtained its official status in 2009.

The cultivation of the vine in Gran Canaria dates back to the end of the s. XV, when the first vines from Crete arrive. In the S. XVI, Canarian wines, due to their quality and prosperity, began to be exported to England, Flanders, Hamburg and the new world. Towards the middle of the century, wine in Gran Canaria played a fundamental role in the island's agricultural economy, becoming the main export product due to the decline in sugar cane cultivation. However, this privileged situation was soon damaged due to the international situation: that is, the war of succession to the Spanish crown. The English gave preference to Portuguese wines, thus definitively undermining the production and trade of Canarian wines practically until today.

== Authorised Grape Varieties ==
The authorised grape varieties are:

- Red: Bastardo Negro, Listán Negro, Negramoll, Tintilla, and Malvasía Rosada are preferred; also authorised is Moscatel Negro
- White: Malvasía Volcánica, Gual, Bermejuela, Vijariego, Albillo, and Moscatel de Alejandría are preferred; also authorised are Listán Blanco, Burrablanca, Torrontés, Breval Blanca, Pedro Ximénez
