= El Hierro (DO) =

Coordinates: 27°48′39.3″N 17°54′51.1″W

El Hierro DOP
- Wine region
- El Hierro DOP in the province of Santa Cruz de Tenerife in the region of Canary Islands
- Official name: D.O.P. El Hierro
- Type: Denominación de Origen Protegida (DOP)
- Year established: 1995
- Country: Spain
- No. of vineyards: 126 hectares (311 acres)
- No. of wineries: 9
- Wine produced: 1,735 hectolitres
- Comments: Data for 2016 / 2017

El Hierro is a Spanish Denominación de Origen Protegida (DOP) for wines that covers the entire island of El Hierro, the smallest and westernmost island of the Canary Islands, Spain. It acquired its DO in 1995.

== History ==
The first vineyards were planted by an Englishman, John Hill, in the seventeenth century. The wine produced was used for distillation of spirits which were then exported to South America, especially Venezuela and Cuba. For centuries, sweet fortified wines from the Canaries were popular in England and was known as Canary Sack. In the play As You Like It by William Shakespeare (1564-1616), Sir Toby Belch calls for a "cup of Canary".

== Geography and soils ==
The vineyards in El Hierro DO are planted on very infertile soils of different types: clay, lime-bearing, marl, sand, and even volcanic ash. All these soils are of volcanic origin as the area known as El Golfo (The Gulf) is formed by the edge of a large extinct volcano. They are all poor in nutrients, but have good water retention properties. There are around 200 hectares (490 acres) planted to vines in this DO.

The vineyards are planted on steep slopes on terraces built of stone. The altitude varies from 125 m to 700 m above sea-level.

The main wine-producing areas are known as Valle del Golfo, Echedo y El Pinar

== Climate ==
The large amount of annual average hours of sun (3,000 hrs/year) and the sea breezes are the main factors affecting the vines. In general the climate is temperate, rather dry close to sea-level and more humid at higher altitudes. Rainfall varies significantly between the east and west of the island, between 150 mm and 400 mm respectively. The trade winds, which blow in summer, affect the northeast of the island and bring significant amounts of humidity to the vineyards located around Echedo. Maximum summer temperatures rarely exceed 28 °C.

== Authorised Grape Varieties ==
The authorised grape varieties are:

- Red: Bastardo Negro, Listán Negro, Negramoll, Tintilla, Vijariego Negro
- White: Bastardo Blanco, Bermejuela, Burrablanca, Gual, Listán blanco de Canarias, Malvasía Aromática, Malvasía Volcánica, Moscatel de Alejandría, Pedro Ximénez, and Vijariego

Traditionally the vines were planted as low bushes (en vaso) though newly planted vineyards tend to be on trellises (en espaldera).
