= Lanzarote (disambiguation) =

Lanzarote is the easternmost of the autonomous Canary Islands.

Lanzarote may also refer to:

- Lanzarote (DO), a Spanish Denominación de Origen for wines
- Lanzarote (novel), a novel by Michel Houellebecq
- Lanzarote (horse), a well-known National Hunt racehorse.
- "Lanzarote", a 1992 song by Brian Eno, from his album The Shutov Assembly

== See also ==
- 392225 Lanzarote, asteroid named after the Canary Island
- Lanzarote Airport, an airport on Lanzarote
- Lanzarote Hurdle, a National Hunt hurdle race run at Kempton Park Racecourse
- UD Lanzarote, a Spanish football team based in Arrecife
