= Prolifera =

Prolifera may refer to:

- a synonym for Albillo, a grape variety
- Prolifera (alga), a red algae genus in the order Gigartinales
