= Mission (grape) =

Variety of grape

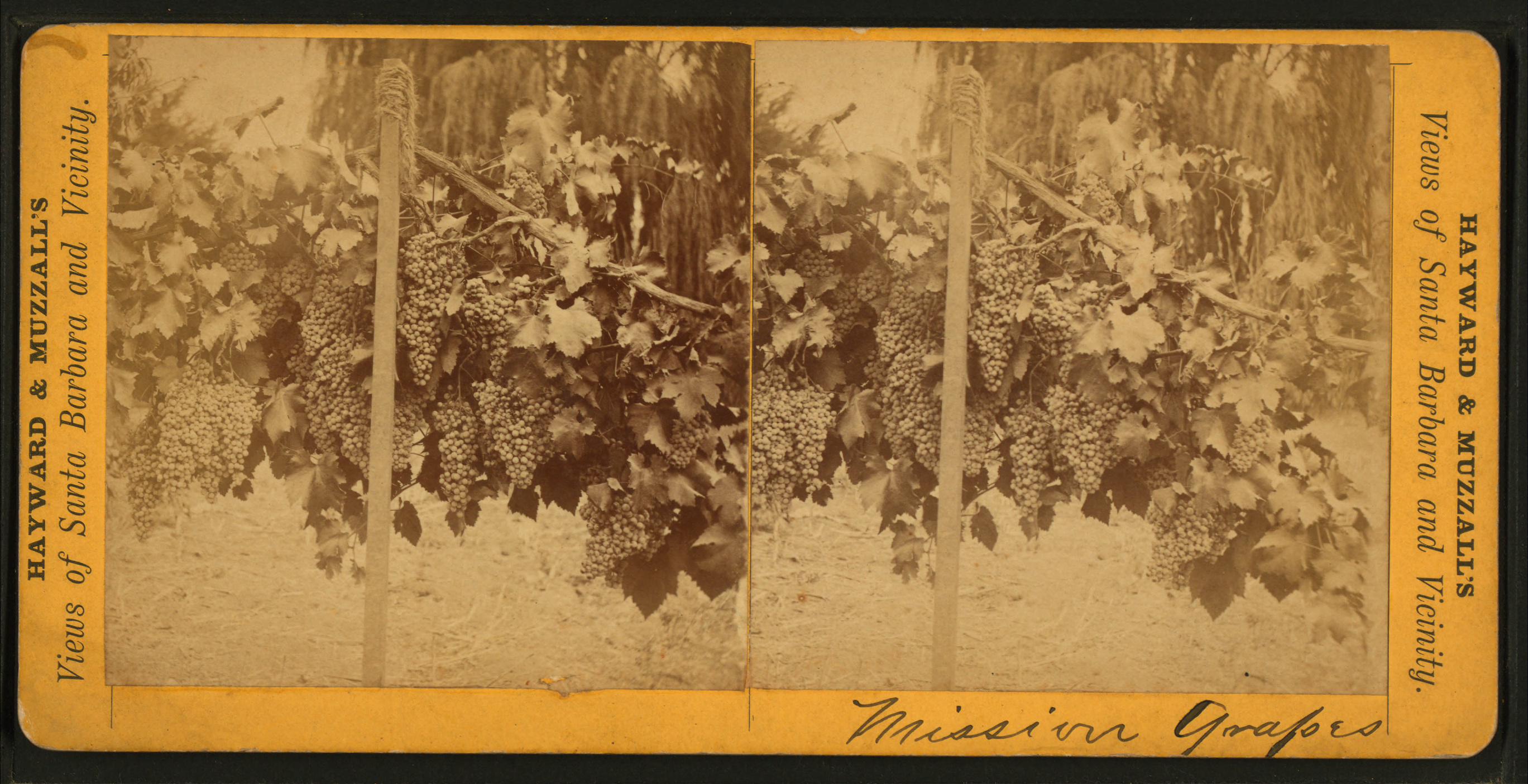
Photo of Mission grapes growing around Santa Barbara, California, circa 1875.

Mission grapes are a variety of Vitis vinifera introduced from Spain to the western coasts of North and South America by Catholic New World missionaries for use in making sacramental, table, and fortified wines. It is grown in South America, particularly in Chile and Peru, under the names Criolla and Pais. During the 19th century, the grape was known by several other names, including the Los Angeles grape, and the California grape.

== History ==
The original European strain, until recently, had been lost, thus the grapes' being named "Mission grapes" since they were generally grown in Spanish missions. Prior to 1522, wine was made from grapes native to the area around Mexico City. However, finding the wine produced lacking, it was decreed by Hernán Cortés that sacramental wine was to be made using grapes grown from cuttings from the Old World, and that the grape was to be planted in every Spanish settlement in the New World. Originally brought to Mexico from Spain in the 16th century, they were planted in New Mexico during the early 17th century. (Note: Eusebio Francisco Kino is credited for its cultivation in Mexico's northwestern regions.) Several decades later wine was introduced to present-day Baja California with the establishment of Misión de Nuestra Señora de Loreto Conchó in 1697 by Jesuit priest Juan de Ugarte. While two grape varieties were native to California, Vitis californica and Vitis girdiana, neither were used for wine production.

The grape was introduced to present-day California in the late 18th century by Franciscan missionaries; the first planting of the grape in present-day California was done by Junipero Serra at Mission San Diego de Alcalá in 1769. (Note: Not all sources agree that Mission San Diego de Alcala was where the first grapes were planted. One source claims that the first vine were planted at Mission San Juan Capistrano. Other sources claim that Mission San Gabriel Arcángel was where the first vine was planted.) The next vines to be planted in present-day California were at Mission San Gabriel Arcángel in 1771, cuttings from this vine would be used to start new vines at Pueblo de Los Ángeles around 1786. Eventually vineyards and wine making expanded to each of the Spanish missions in California. By the last decade of the 18th century, Mission San Gabriel Arcángel was making 35,000,000 US gallons (130,000 kL) of wine. In 1820, the wine made from Mission grapes began to be exported overseas. A dessert wine made from the Mission grapes of the missions gained a reputation of quality in Europe. Making wine was a leading source of revenue for the missions, but ceased after secularization in the 1830s; eventually the vineyards of the missions began to be abandoned.

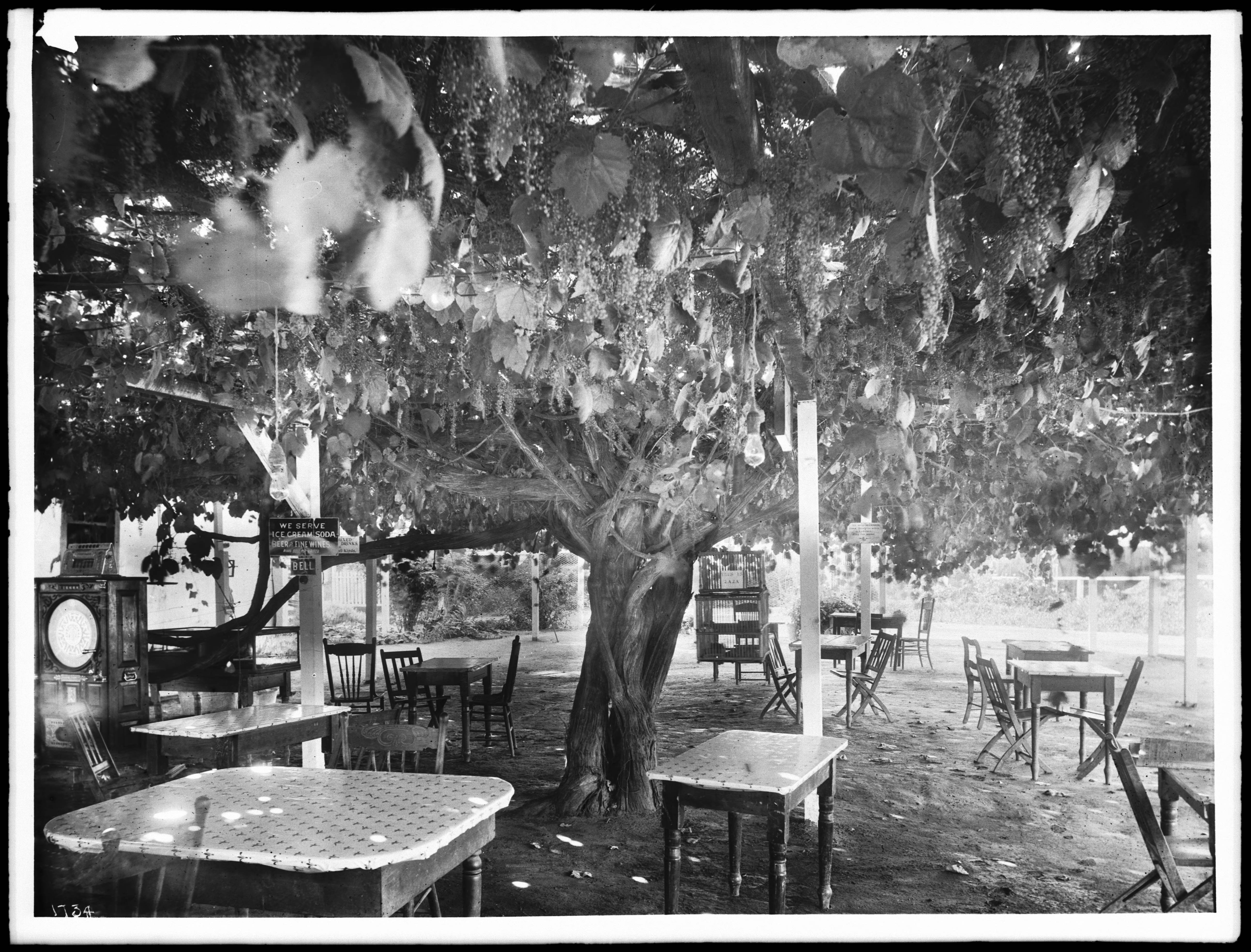
A grape arbor at Mission San Gabriel in 1898. The vine was planted in 1862.

Until about 1865, Mission grapes represented the entirety of viticulture in California wines. (Note: By the 1850s, plantings of imported European grapes were present in present-day Los Angeles County, due to the efforts of Matthew Keller, Jean-Louis Vignes, and others.) In 1870, Mission grapes were still described as universal; when eaten as fruit they were "pleasant, and agreeable". As late as 1888, 4,000 acres (1,600 ha) of Napa Valley were used to grow Mission grapes. Yet, back in Spain, the vines which the Mission grapes had descended from, were wiped out by phylloxera in all areas except the Canary Islands. (Note: Phylloxera infestation was first experienced in California in 1858.) From 1880, to 1920, the amount of land which Mission grapes were grown on reduced from 30,000 acres (12,000 ha) to 5,000 acres (2,000 ha). (Note: During this time period, the then world's largest grape vine was of the mission variety, and was in Capenteria Valley.) During the Prohibition era, the grape largely disappeared from California, with wine made in Mexico smuggled into the United States. One vineyard in Santa Barbara County had sagebrush grown over it, to hide it from being ripped out by prohibitionists; (Note: Cuttings from this vineyard, are being planted at Mission Santa Barbara to revive its historic garden.) while others were just abandoned. Afterwards it has largely been replaced by noble grape varieties. (Note: It remained in quantities, well into the mid-20th century, but was often used to in blended wines, or in inexpensive fortified drinks, losing its once esteemed reputation.)

=== Niche resurgence ===
As of 2016, the oldest surviving living vine of Mission grape exists at Mission San Gabriel Arcángel, with the oldest vine still bearing fruit being at Avila Adobe. (Note: A vine which grows over Olvera Street originates at the adobe, and is a genetic match to those from Mission San Gabriel Arcángel.) In 2017, most of the state's remaining plantings of the Mission grapes are in the Gold Country, growing in about total 1,000 acres (400 ha). By 2019, the United States Department of Agriculture estimated that Mission grapes are grown on about 400 acres (160 ha) in California. Cultivation has also begun in Baja California, Mexico, where 24 acres (9.7 ha) of century old vines are harvested near Tecate.

== Wines ==
Early accounts of alcoholic beverages made using the Mission grape recall the use of simplistic methods utilizing cowhides, grape treading, and leather bags. The first pressing, producing white wine, later pressings producing red wine, and brandy distilled from the remaining residue. During the 19th century, the Mission grape was used to make strong wines similar to port and sherry. The wine produced by the mission grape was described by Julius Dresel (Note: The brother of Emil Dresel, and whose family was important in early viticulture in Sonoma County.) as having "a marked Burgundy flavor,". Yet, that opinion of the wine's taste wasn't shared by all, and it also received negative and unflattering descriptions. The vine has a twisting thick trunk, looking more like a small tree rather than other types of vines. When fruiting, the vines produce "big, heavy, deep-red grape clusters,". It was also written that the grapes of this variety grown in Northern California were called Sonoma grape, while grapes of this variety grown in Southern California were called Los Angeles Grape, with each imparting a distinct flavor compared to the other; elsewhere they were called California grape. Recently, it has been proposed that the Sonoma grape was brought to Northern California from Peru by Russian settlers of Fort Ross in 1817.

Historically, four types of wines were made from this variety: white, a dry red, a sweet red, and a sweet brandy fortified wine. These historic wines did not age well, and would sour after three years. In the 21st century, the mission variety is grown in Amador, Calaveras, and Santa Barbara counties, as well as in Lodi in San Joaquin County. From these growers, they have produced angelica, dry, and table wines. Other wines made from this variety are natural red, port, sacramental, and sherry. When made into a table wine, it creates a wine described as "very light boddied, yet extremely tannic, often indistinguishable in color from a dark rose, tasting of bitter orange peel and light red fruits, like rhubarb and strawberry.". Angelica made from mission grapes has been described as "unusually sweet," with notes "reminiscent of molasses, dried figs, caramel, nuts and toffee.". Sacramental wine made from this variety has been described as "sickly sweet, with almost no acid to speak".

Though Mission grape vines are heavy producers and can adapt to a variety of climates, table wine made from the fruit tends to be rather characterless, and thus its use in wine making has diminished in modern times. However, as both contemporary accounts and those of the last two centuries attest, angelica, the fortified wine made from the grape, is sometimes a wine of note and distinction; in its angelica form, it has been described as having similar regional importance as port to Portugal, sherry to Spain, and marsala to Sicily. The Mission grape is related to the pink Criolla grape of Argentina, and the red País grape of Chile. Despite being almost extinct in California after a century of being maligned and put down as an inferior grape, recently interest has increased in Mission again. A lot of smaller producers are embracing its long history and the very few plantings still left in the state. It is a drought resistant plant.

== European antecedent ==
In December 2006, Spanish scholars from the Centro Nacional de Biotecnología in Madrid uncovered the name and origin of the mysterious Mission grape, as well as which were the earliest European vines grown in the Americas. (Note: Another sources claim that the Mission grape is related to the Listán negro.) Their findings are due to appear in the journal of the American Society of Enology and Viticulture. The scholars determined that the Mission grape's DNA matched a little-known Spanish variety called Listan Prieto. Listan is another name for Palomino, although not related to the white grape Palomino Fino used to make Sherry.

== See also ==
- History of California wine
