= Frangollo =

- Type: Dessert
- Place of origin: Canary Islands
- Main ingredients: Milk, millet or maize flour, lemon, eggs, sugar, butter, raisins, almonds, cinnamon

Frangollo is a Canarian dessert dish, made from milk, millet or maize flour, lemon, eggs, sugar, butter, raisins, almonds, and cinnamon. Many variations exist, for example replacing the milk with water, or adding aniseed.

== See also ==
- Canarian cuisine
- List of desserts
