= Doradillo =

Variety of grape

- Grape (Vitis)
- Color of berry skin: Blanc
- Species: Vitis vinifera
- Also called: Blanquette of South Australia
- Origin: Spain
- Notable regions: Riverland

Doradillo is a white wine grape grown primarily in the Riverland region of South Australia. It originates from Spain, and is also known as Blanquette of South Australia.

Doradillo is also used as a synonym for the grape varieties Jaén Blanco and Doradilla, but Doradilla is also a distinct variety.
