= Angelica wine =

Angelica wine is a historic sweet fortified wine usually from California made typically from the Mission grape. The wine is fortified with brandy added to unfermented Mission grape juice. It is often served as a dessert wine.

The wine is said to have originated during the Spanish Mission period in California and was produced by Franciscan missionaries, making it one of the earliest wines made in the region.

== History ==
Angelica dates to the Spanish Mission period in California and its name is thought to be taken from the city of Los Angeles. It was produced by the Spanish Franciscan missionaries who cultivated Mission grapes throughout the region. It originated as an unfermented grape juice mixed with spirits, and then became a more typical fortified wine after a post-Prohibition federal tax-code change. Angelica is considered one of the earliest wines made in the state.

The wine is sometimes made in a simple style and is inexpensive. Some is made with great care from ancient vines and can be quite expensive. Bottles of Angelica as old as 1870 can still be found and show great distinction.

== Production ==
Angelica is traditionally made from the Mission grape. It is typically made from 50% Mission wine and 50% Mission brandy. Several production methods are used.

In one method, unfermented grape juice is fortified with brandy or clear spirit immediately after pressing. Others are made like port, where the only partially fermented wine, still retaining a large amount of sugar, is infused with brandy. The relatively high alcohol of the brandy arrests the fermentation, leaving a fortified wine high in alcohol and high in residual sugar (usually about 10 to 15%).

== Modern Production ==
Although Angelica is associated with the early California missions period, a small number of California producers continue to make Mission-based Angelica. A 2008 article stated that fewer than a dozen vintners were producing Angelica at that time.

In 2023, Decanter reported the release of an Angelica made from grapes from Mission San Gabriel’s vine after three years of ageing in French oak. The release comprised 336 total 375ml bottles.

Production from the Mission San Gabriel project has been described as very limited with only half a barrel of Angelica produced annually.

In November 2025, a further release was made from Mission San Gabriel grapes, with fewer than 200 bottles offered for sale.
