= Listán negro =

Variety of grape

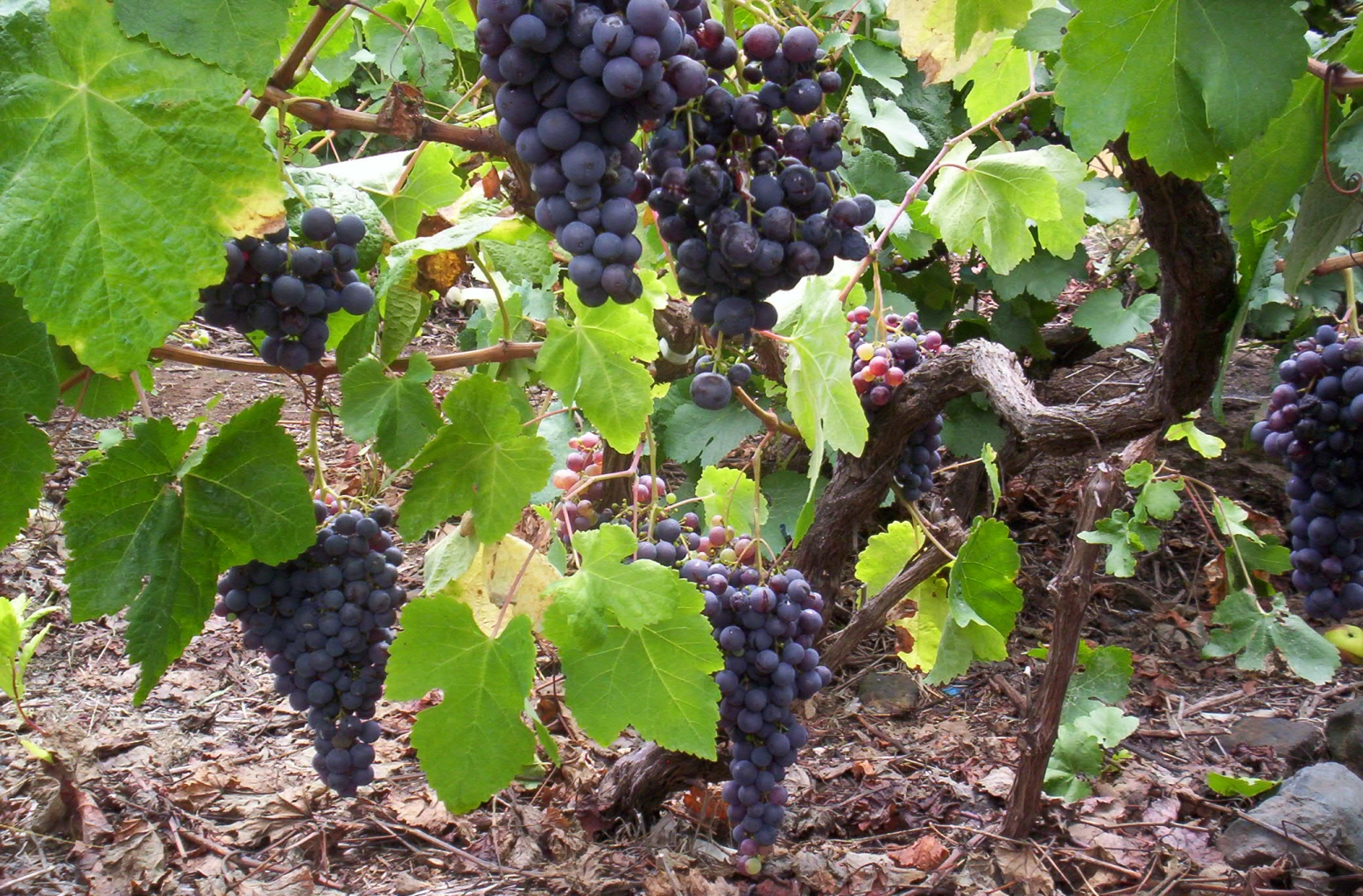
Listan negro grapes growing in Tenerife

Listán Negro (not to be confused with Listán Prieto) is a red Spanish wine grape variety that is widely planted in the Canary Islands, particularly on the island of Tenerife where it is a permitted variety in the Denominaciones de Origen (DO) wines of Tacoronte-Acentejo, Valle de la Orotava, Ycoden-Daute-Isora, and Valle de Güímar. It is also permitted in the Spanish wine regions of El Hierro, Gran Canaria, La Gomera, La Palma, Lanzarote. More than 5,000 hectares (12,000 acres) of the Listán Negro grape variety are planted across the Canary Islands.

== History ==
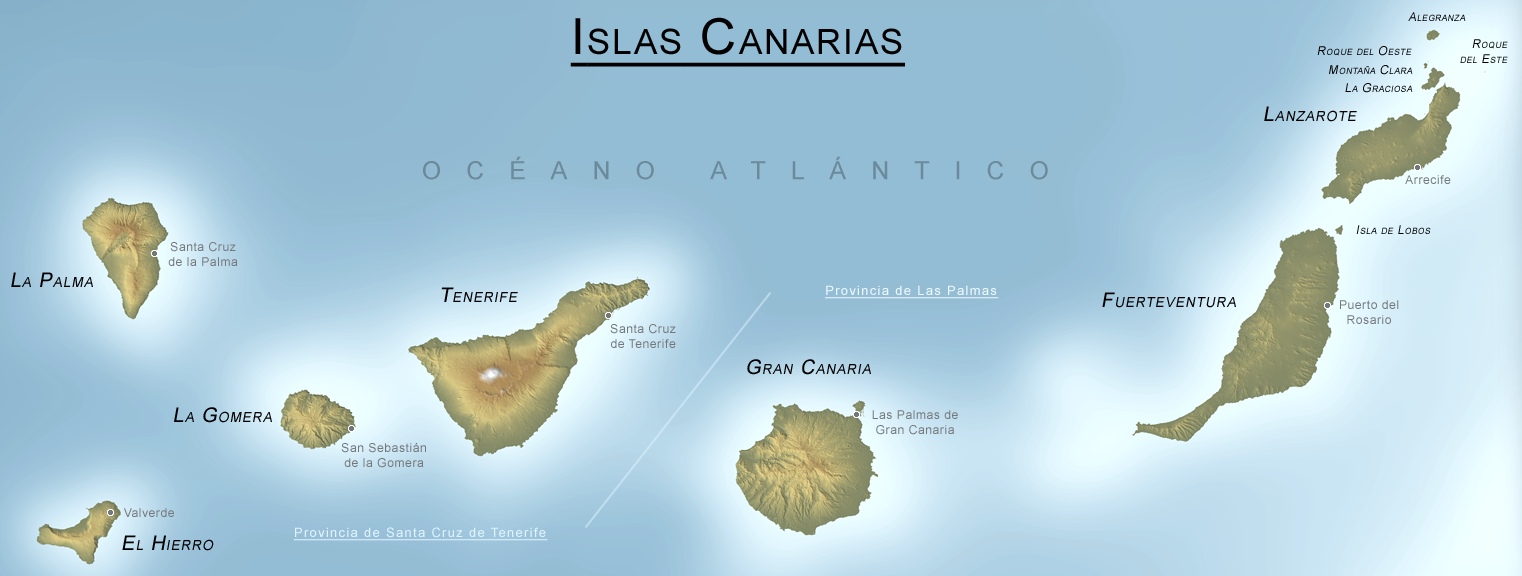
The Canary Islands are located off the coast of Africa and were an important stopover point for ships traveling from Spain to the New World.

It is thought that Listán Negro and Listán Prieto were widely planted in the Castile region during the 16th century. Settlers to the Canary Islands brought the vines with them and eventually Listán Prieto made its way to the Spanish colonies in Mexico and Peru. From there, the grape spread throughout North and South America where it developed clonal variations that became grape varieties that are now known as Mission in California and Mexico, País in Chile and Criolla Chica in Argentina.

== Wine styles and winemaking ==
Many winemakers on the Canary Islands favor the use of carbonic maceration to produce a soft fruity, medium-bodied wines that can be highly aromatic. In recent years, producers have been experimenting with oak aging. It is commonly seen as a varietal wine in Tacoronte-Acentejo but in other DOs it is often blended-usually with Negramoll (Tinta Negra Mole), Tintilla and Malvasia Rosada. Some producers on Tenerife also make a sweet wine from Listán Negro with grapes that have been dried in the sun.

== Viticulture ==
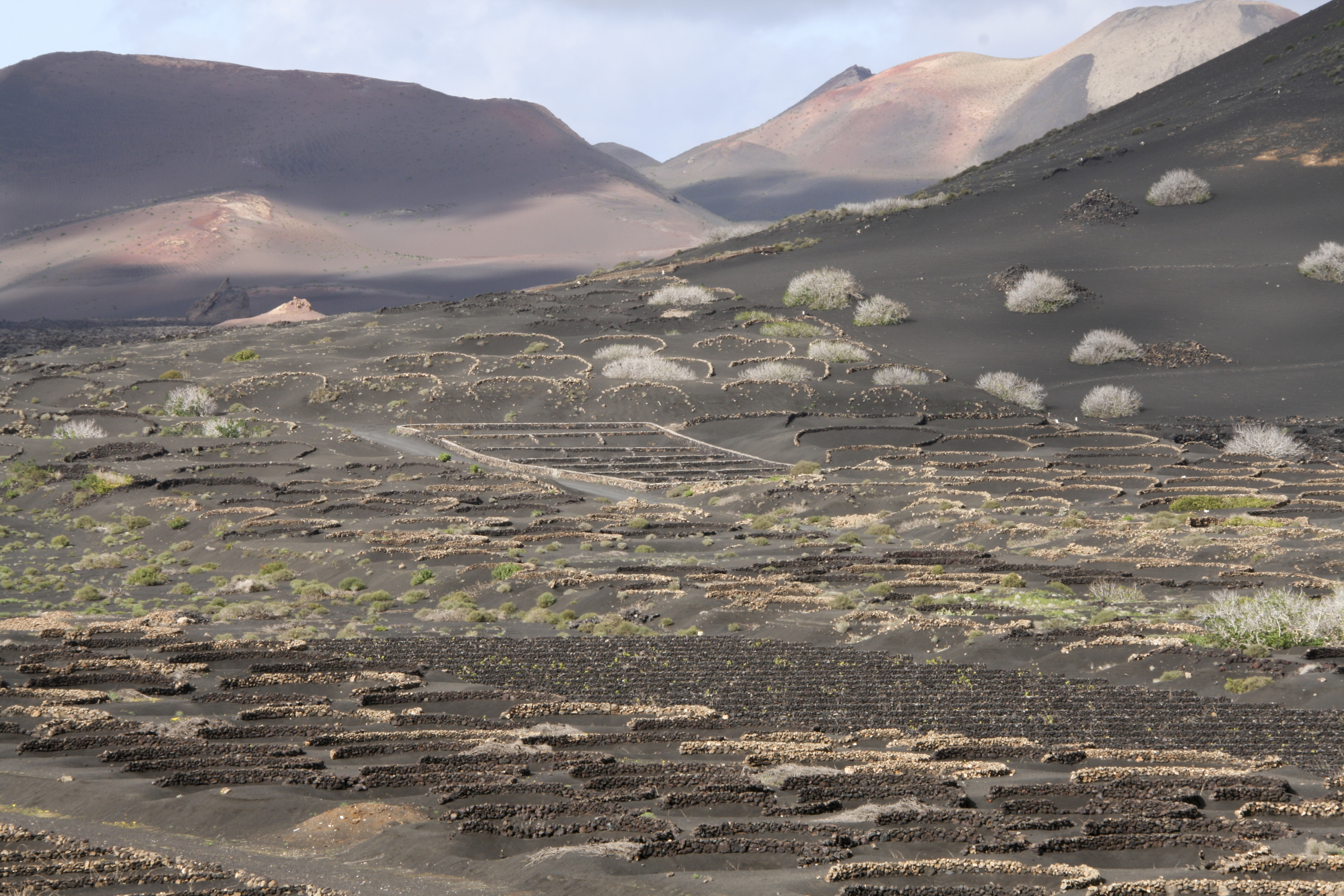
On the island of Lanzarote, Listán Negro vines are planted in hollow pits that are surrounded by stone walls.

On the island of Lanzarote, Listán Negro is planted in hollowed pits dug into the volcanic soils that is sheltered from the strong Atlantic winds by stone walls that are built around the vines in a semicircle. The vines are braided together into a formation called the "cordón trenzado."

== Synonyms ==
Various synonyms have been used to describe Listán Negro and its wines, including Almuñeco, Listán Negra, Palomino Negro, Printanier Rouge, Negra Común and Negromuelle.

Under the name of Listán Prieto, the Vitis International Variety Catalogue also list Duhamelii, Listan Morado, Molar, Mollar, Mollar de Cadiz, Mollar de Granada, Mollar de Huelva, Mollar Morado, Mollar Negro, Mollar Prieto, Mollar Sevillano, Mollar Zucari, Mollis, Mollissima, Morisca Negra Mole, Sabra Molle, Tinta Molle, Tinta Sabreirinha and Tinta Sobreirinha.
