= Torrontés =

Green grape variety

- Grape (Vitis)
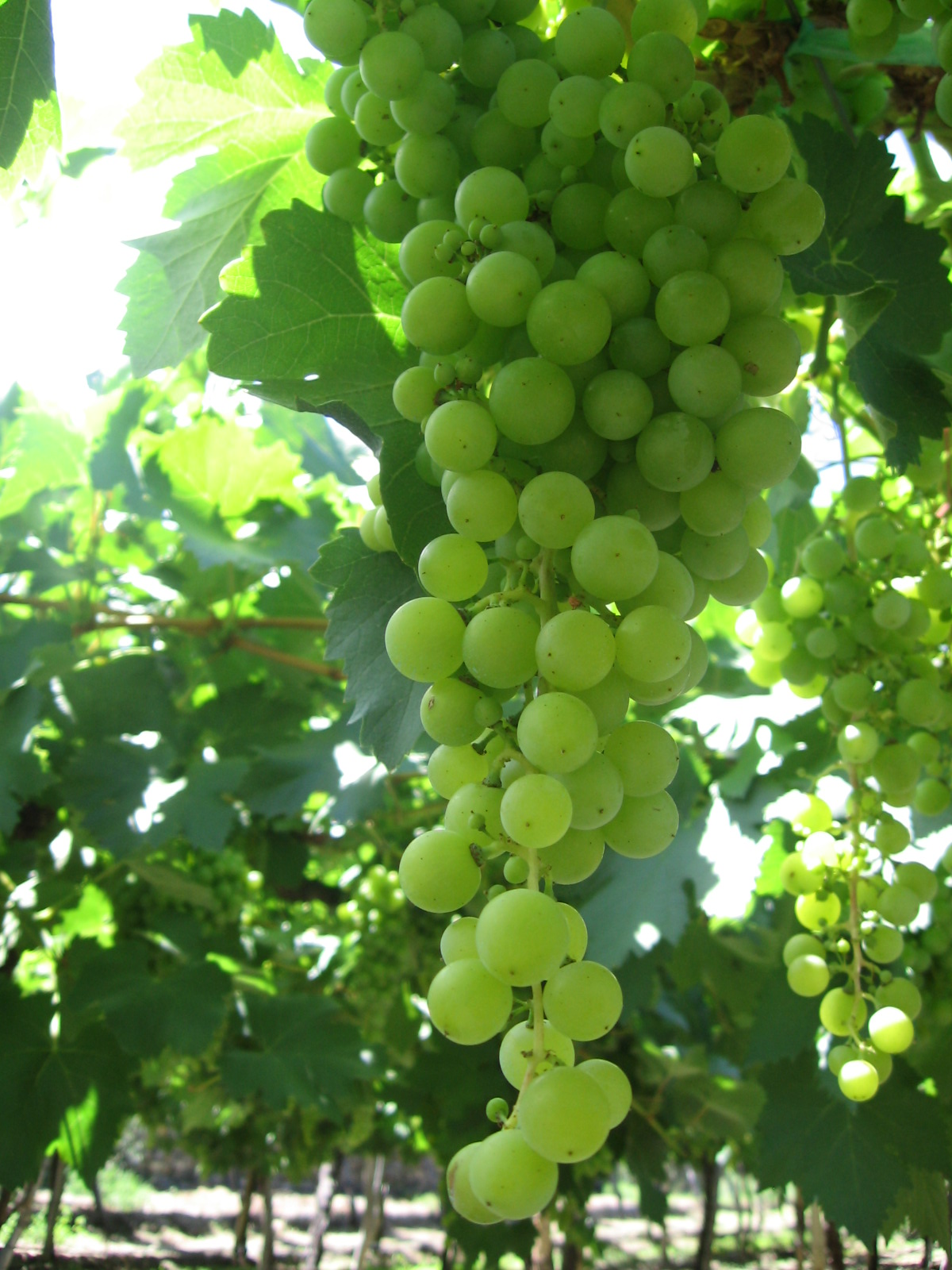
- Color of berry skin: Blanc
- Species: Vitis vinifera
- Also called: Torrontés Riojano, Torrontés Sanjuanino, Torrontés Mendocino, Torrontel, and other synonyms
- Notable regions: Argentina

Torrontés is a white grape variety, mostly produced and known in Argentina, producing fresh, aromatic wines with moderate acidity, smooth texture and mouthfeel as well as distinctive peach and apricot aromas on the nose. Three Torrontés varieties exist in Argentina: Torrontés Riojano, the most common, Torrontés Sanjuanino, and Torrontés Mendocino. It is primarily Torrontés Riojano that has received attention for the quality of its wines, and is the variety used for most Argentine wines simply labeled Torrontés.

The three grapes are relatively similar but do have some noticeable differences. Torrontés Riojano and Torrontés Sanjuanino both tend to have large loose bunches of pale grapes while Torrontés Mendocino, however, has smaller, tighter bunches of darker yellow grapes. Torrontés Riojano is the most aromatic of the three, with aromas reminiscent of Muscat and Gewürtztraminer wines. The least aromatic, and least widely planted, is Torrontés Mendocino with the aromatics and plantings of Torrontés Sanjuanino falling in between. All three Argentine Torrontés varieties belong to the Criollas group of grape varieties, which is a term used for presumably American-born cultivars of the European grapevine Vitis vinifera.

Around 8,700 hectares (21,000 acres) in Argentina have been planted with Torrontés Riojano, and 4,850 hectares (12,000 acres) with Torrontés Sanjuanino. Plantings in the very high altitudes (1700m+) of the Calchaquíes Valleys in the far north of Argentina have recently met with success. The vine is highly productive and is just under ten percent of all white grape plantings, however as a varietal, it made up almost 20 percent of all white wine sold in Argentina in 2008. The Salta region in northwest Argentina is particularly noted for its Torrontés as the grape thrives in cold dry, windswept conditions.

== History and relation to other grapes ==
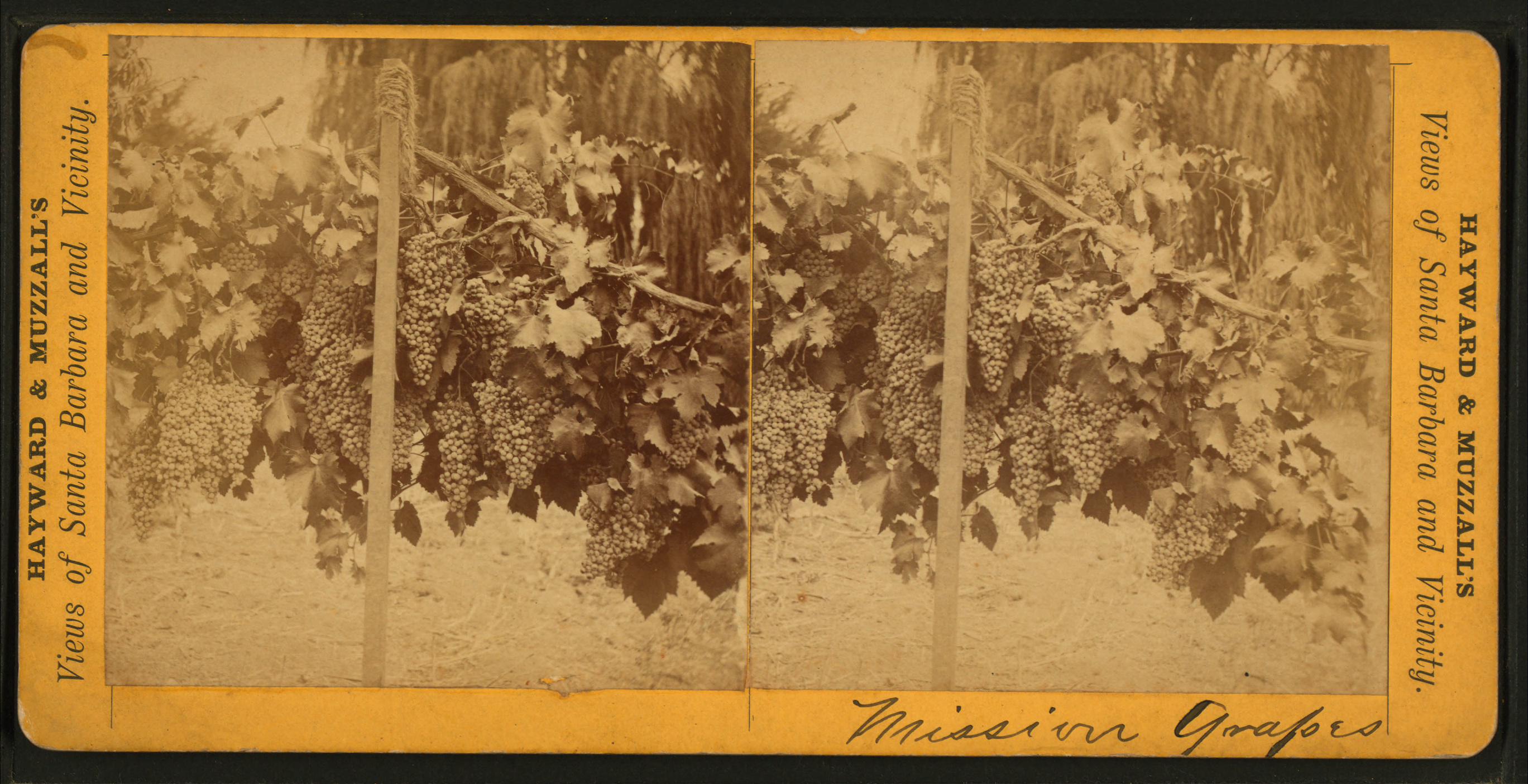
DNA evidence suggest that the Mission grape (seen here in a late 19th-century photo growing in California) is one of the parents of Torrontés.

Recent research using DNA profiling has shown that the different Torrontés are genetically closely related but distinct grape varieties, and that Torrontés Riojano, Torrontés Sanjuanino, and Torontel (also known as Moscatel Amarillo) are all separate crossings of Mission (originally reported as Criolla Chica) and Muscat of Alexandria. Torrontés Mendocino was found to probably be a crossing of Muscat of Alexandria and another, so far unidentified grape variety. While the Muscat-like qualities of the Torrontés varieties meant that a relationship to Muscat of Alexandria had been expected, the presence of Mission or Criolla Chica in the pedigree was unexpected to the researchers.

For many years it was believed that the Torrontés of South America was the same variety as the Torrontés grape from Galicia in Spain, also known as Albillo Mayor. This widespread belief was due, in part, to the frequent migration waves of Galician workers that have emigrated to Argentina throughout its history. Indeed, even wine expert Jancis Robinson, noted as much in her 1986 book on the world's grape varieties. However, recent DNA evidence shows that there is probably no direct relationship between the Argentine and Spanish Torrontés varieties and more recent editions of Robinson's wine books acknowledge the new findings.

There is also a less common red wine grape called Torrontés, which is also known under the synonyms Tarrantes and Turrundos.

== Wine regions ==
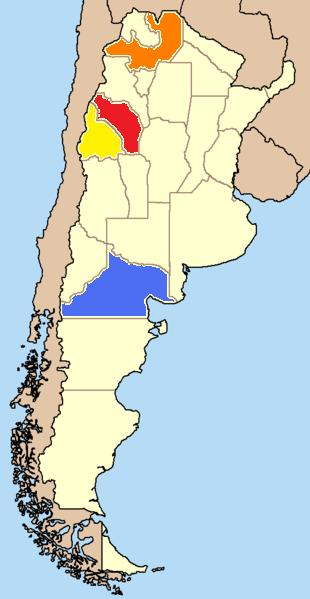
The provinces of Argentina that grow the most Torrontés. Torrontés Riojano is most widely grown in La Rioja (red) and Salta (orange). Torrontés Sanjuanino is most widely grown in the San Juan province (yellow) while Torrontés Mendocino is most widely grown in the Rio Negro province (blue).

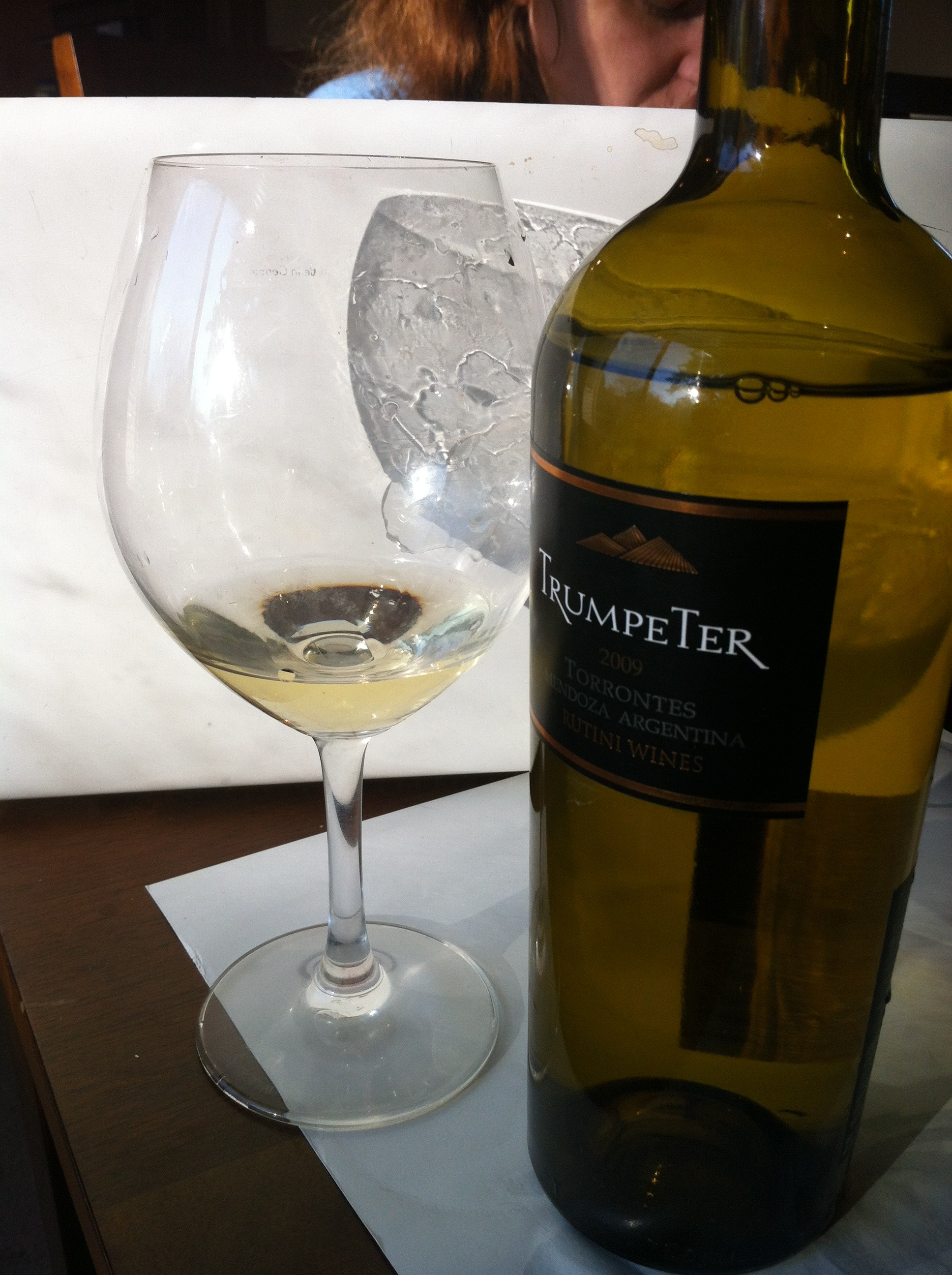
An Argentine Torrontés.

Torrontés is grown throughout Argentina and its acreage is steadily increasing. Part of its increase in numbers comes from the increase in Argentine wine exportation where the grape has found considerable success in the United States, United Kingdom and abroad but also from a better understanding and identification of the different Torrontés varieties that allow for better accounting of plantings. For most of its history (including into the late 20th century) Torrontés lagged behind Pedro Giménez and Ugni blanc among white grape varieties in Argentina. But by the early 21st century, declining plantings in those two varieties and the growing popularity of Torrontés allowed it to surpass them and become Argentina's most widely planted white variety where it continued to be as of 2008.

The different Torrontés varieties have developed niche in different areas of Argentina. Torrontés Riojano is widely grown in the La Rioja and Salta provinces of northern Argentina and is, in fact, the single most widely planted variety (both red and white) in La Rioja. In Salta, the grape is often planted in high altitude, sandy vineyards that are often more than 1,600 meters (5,200 feet) above sea level. Here, the harsh growing conditions allow the variety to attain high acidity and assertive flavors.

In the arid San Juan province, Torrontés Sanjuanino is found but is planted to a much less significant amount than Torrontés Riojano. Torrontés Mendocino is, by far, the least widely planted variety and is mostly found in the southern province of Rio Negro.

=== Outside of Argentina ===
Torrontés is grown in Chile. However, the exact number of plantings (and of which variety) are not completely known. In 1996, Jancis Robinson noted that there were several hundred hectares of Torontel grown but that some of these plantings may actually be the Galician variety. Additionally, Torrontés is known in Chile often under the synonym Moscatel de Austria, which is believed to be Torrontés Sanjuanino.

According to wine expert Oz Clarke, most plantings of Torrontés in Chile are Torrontés Riojano and the grape is primarily used in the production of the Chilean brandy, pisco.

Torrontes is also grown in Samaipata, Bolivia.

=== Spanish Torrontés ===
While DNA evidence shows that there is probably no relationship between the Galician variety of Torrontés and the South American variety, consumers may still see Spanish wine labeled as Torrontés from the Galician wine region of Ribeiro as well as other Denominación de Origen such as the Gran Canaria of the Canary Islands (most likely the Terrantez variety of Madeira), Montilla-Moriles and Madrid.

== Wine style ==
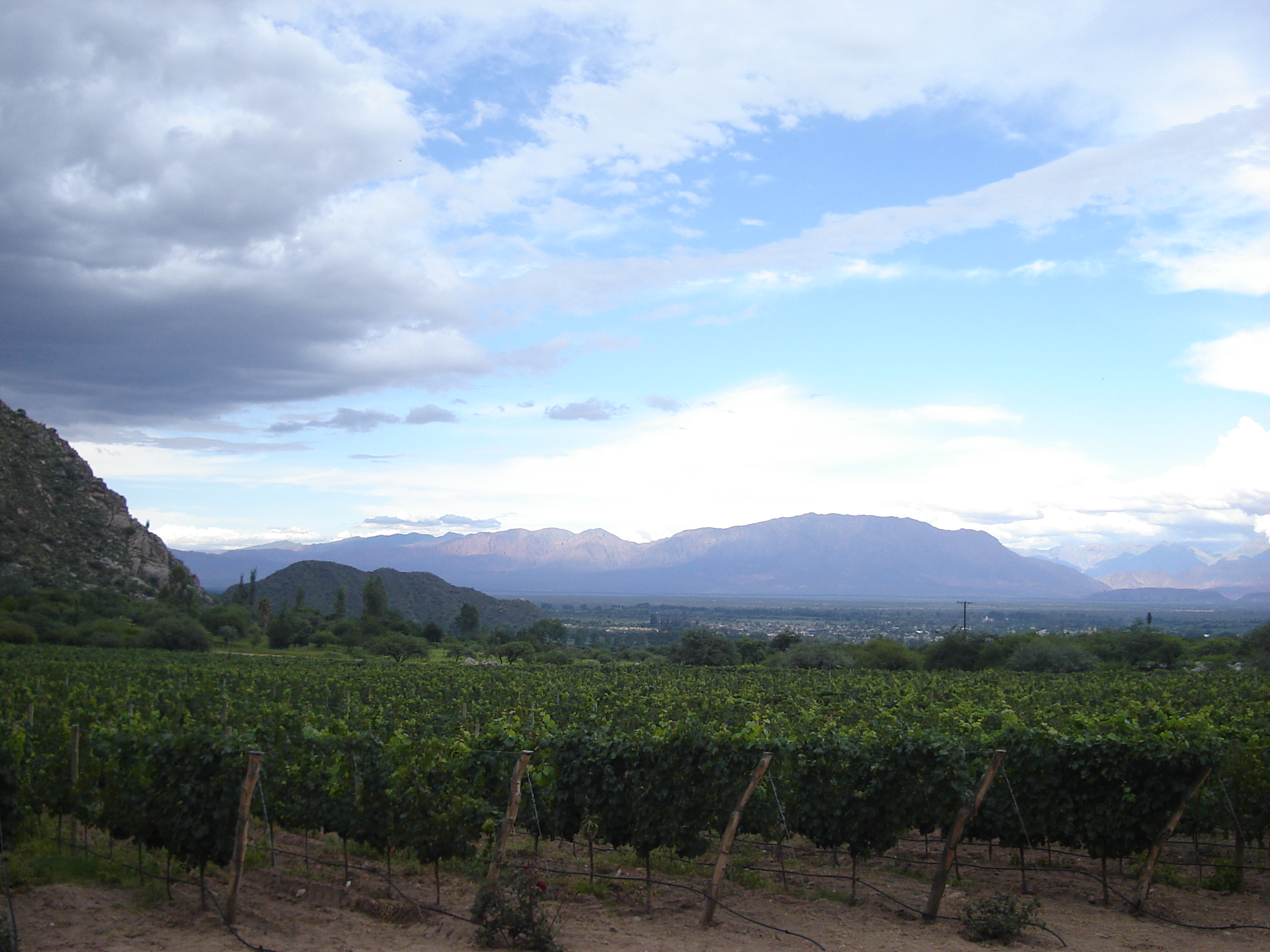
Torrontés growing in the Cafayate vineyard of the Salta province.

According to wine expert Jancis Robinson, Torrontés has the capability of producing wines of high quality, but its success is dependent on the skill and care of the winemaking process, particularly in maintaining suitable acid levels to balance the wine. At its most ideal, Robinson notes, Torrontés are "wines for early drinking that are not too heavy, are high in acidity, and are intriguingly aromatic in a way reminiscent of but not identical to Muscat." But poorer made examples can come across as bitter and excessively alcoholic.

Wine expert Oz Clarke, also notes the dependency on careful vinification for the quality of Torrontés but also notes that the size of the harvest yield can also play a substantial role. While the aroma of Torrontés is often associated with Muscat, Clarke notes that many examples can be very similar to Gewürztraminer with subtle spice notes mixed with the floral bouquet of the wine. Clarke also notes that the wine tends not to age very well and is often consumed within a year of its vintage date.

== Synonyms ==
The three Argentine Torrontés varieties are known under the following names:

- Torrontés Riojano is also known as Malvasia (cf. malvasia), Torrontel, and Torrontel Riojano.
- Torrontés Sanjuanino is also known as Moscatel Romano, Moscatel Sanjuanino, and Torrontel.
- Torrontés Mendocino is also known as Chichera, Loca Blanca, Palet, Torrontel, Uva Chichera and Torrontés Mendozino.

In Chile, the variety is also known as Torontel and Moscatel de Austria.
