= Ruby Cabernet =

Variety of grape

- Grape (Vitis)
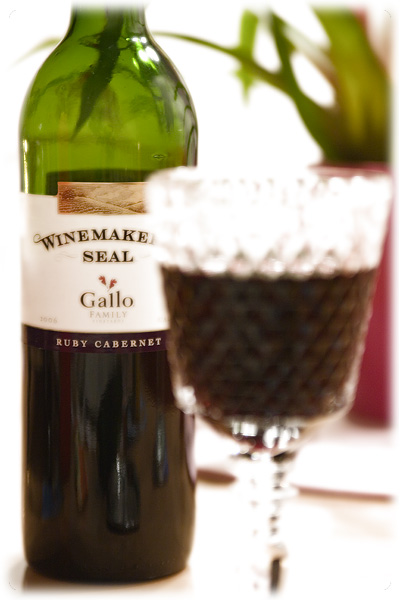
- Species: Vitis vinifera
- Also called: -
- Origin: California, United States
- Notable regions: California, South Africa, Australia
- Hazards: Powdery mildew, leaf roll virus, fan leaf virus
- VIVC number: 10313

Ruby Cabernet is a red Olmo grape variety that is a cross between Cabernet Sauvignon and Carignan. It can produce wines with good color and a pleasant cherry flavor, but is mostly blended into bulk wines.

The purpose for the creation of the crossing of the grape varieties utilized to produce Ruby Cabernet was to obtain the superior quality of a Cabernet wine, and the resistance to heat of the Carignan combined in an inexpensive table wine. Even though the wine made from these grapes does not possess the distinctive flavor and the overall structure of other types of Cabernet wines, it does carry their fruitful essence.

The grape for this type of red wine was developed for California's hot climate, specially for regions such as the San Joaquin and the Napa Valleys. Ruby Cabernet has improved the quality of the bulk wines produced in these areas thanks to its natural, special acidity.

== History ==
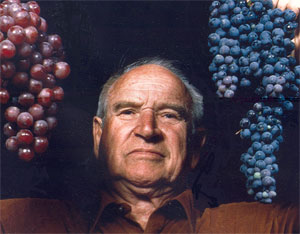
Dr. Harold Olmo, creator of Ruby Cabernet.

Ruby Cabernet is a cross between Cabernet Sauvignon and Carignan created in 1936 by Dr Harold Olmo at UC Davis in California. The intention was to combine Carignan's heat tolerance with Cabernet Sauvignon's quality, like the Cinsaut x Pinot noir cross that led to Pinotage a few years previously.

== Wine regions ==
=== Argentina ===
A little is grown in Argentina for blending into bulk wines.

=== Australia ===
Small amounts are grown in the Hunter Valley and Murray-Darling area, disappearing into undistinguished blends. However, a few producers take the variety seriously. Andrew McPherson in Victoria uses the variety in several export wines f.x Full Fifteen exported to England and Denmark.

=== Brazil ===
Vale do São Francisco winery in Pernambuco, Brazilian Northeast region, successfully grows the variety and produces the wine Botticelli Coleção Ruby Cabernet. Vinícola Campos de Cima in Itaqui, Campanha Gaúcha, grows the grape and produces a 100% varietal of the wine Ruby Cabernet.

=== Mexico ===
Valle De Guadalupe, Baja California (near Ensenada) produces a very nice variety and quality wines. Included is Cabernet Franc - Malbec/Ruby Cabernet. Aguascalientes is also another wine region where wines with this grape are produced.

=== Chile ===
Some Ruby Cabernet is supposedly grown in Chile, but few wines will admit to it on the label.

=== Israel ===
A little Ruby Cabernet is used by the Tishbi winery in Zichron Ya'akov. Some 17 tons were harvested in 2012.

=== South Africa ===
For a while, Ruby Cabernet was thought to hold a lot of promise for the hotter regions of South Africa, but in practice problems with fruit set have limited its success. It is successfully grown in the Robertson district, and forms the main ingredient of the Van Loveren "River Red" blend.

=== Spain ===
Several DOs on the Islas Canarias feature Ruby Cabernet in their authorized list of grape varieties including DO Lanzarote, Tacoronte-Acentejo, Valle de Güímar, and Valle de la Orotava.

=== United States ===
Ruby Cabernet is mostly planted in California, particularly in the San Joaquin Valley where it adds color and backbone to bulk wines. Vineyards where farming techniques are employed to maximize quality however can produce wines with exceptional aroma, flavor, and mouth feel.

== Vine and Viticulture ==
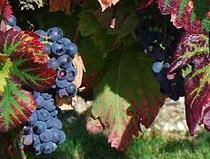
Carignan

The vine is very drought resistant, and stands up well to high winds. Poor fruit set has been a problem in South Africa, and it is vulnerable to powdery mildew. In California's San Joaquin Valley, vineyards should limit irrigation, thin crop, and expose fruit to the sun to maximize wine quality.

=== Vineyard ground ===
The vineyards on which grapes for Ruby Cabernet are grown, are seat on vigorous grounds filled with deep clay loam. The canopies on these vineyards are usually quite open and not completely established. The spacing below the vineyard row is normally of about seven to eight feet for optimal vertical shoot positioning. In case of vineyards which are quadrilateral and divided in a horizontal way, the space must be of about six to seven feet.

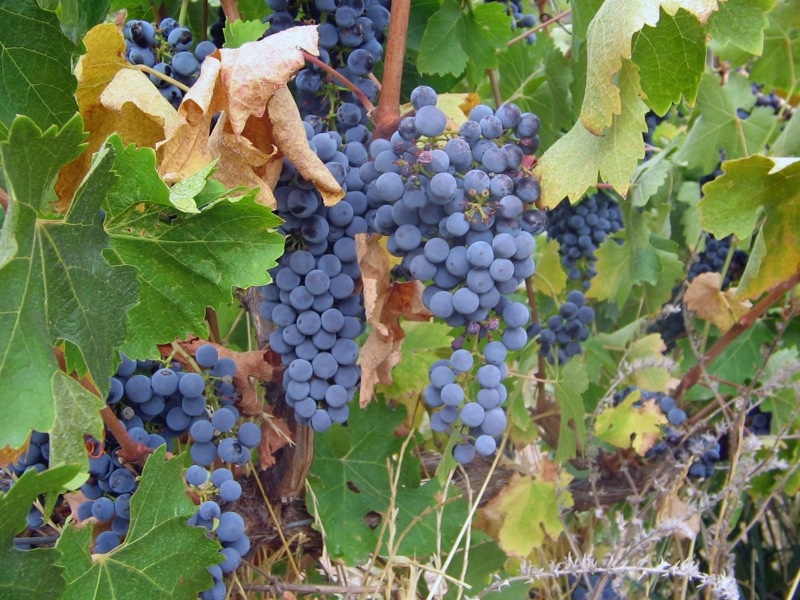
Cabernet Sauvignon
