= Doradilla (grape) =

Variety of grape

Doradilla Blanc
- Grape (Vitis)
- Color of berry skin: Blanc
- Species: Vitis vinifera
- Origin: Málaga, Spain
- Notable regions: Málaga and Sierras de Málaga

Doradilla is a variety of white wine grape originating in Málaga, southern Spain. It is a distinct variety from Doradillo.

== Distribution ==
Doradilla is grown in Spain, where it is an authorised variety in the wine regions of Málaga and Sierras de Málaga DOPs.
