= Beba (grape) =

Variety of grape

- Grape (Vitis)
- Color of berry skin: Blanc
- Species: Vitis vinifera
- Also called: Eva, Eva de los Santos, and other synonyms
- Origin: Spain
- Pedigree parent 1: Hebén
- Notable regions: Ribera del Guadiana
- Formation of seeds: Complete
- Sex of flowers: Hermaphrodite
- VIVC number: 22710

Beba is a white Spanish grape variety grown for both wine and table grapes in the province of Extremadura. It is a vigorous, high-yielding vine that is sensitive to low temperatures and dampness during bloom. Annual productivity varies greatly depending on prevailing weather influences. It is grown for both wine and table grapes. It is also known as: Beba de los Santos, Beba de los Santos de Maimona, Beba de Palos, Beba Dorada, Beba Dorada de Huelva, Beba Dorada de Jaen, Beba Dorada de Jerez, Beva, Bevah, Bevan, Eva de los Santos, Eva de los Santos de Maimona, and White Malaga. This was the vine presented by Louis XIV's ambassador to King Narai of Siam, where it became the start of a flourishing grape industry.
