= Tinta Cão =

Variety of grape

- Grape (Vitis)
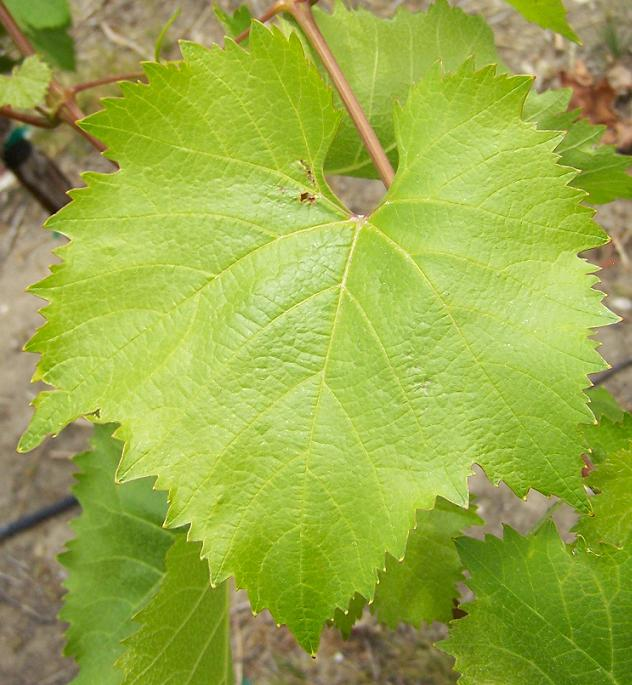
- Tinta Cão leaf
- Color of berry skin: Noir
- Species: Vitis vinifera
- Also called: Castellana Negra
- Origin: Douro
- VIVC number: 12500

Tinta Cão is a red Portuguese wine grape variety that has been grown primarily in the Douro region since the sixteenth century. The vine produces very low yields which has led it close to extinction despite the high quality of wine that it can produce. Improvements in bilateral cordon training and experiments at University of California, Davis have helped to sustain the variety. The vine favors cooler climates and can add finesse and complexity to a wine blend.

== Synonyms ==
Spanish synonyms include Castellana Negra.

== See also ==
- List of Port wine grapes
- List of Portuguese grape varieties
