= Forastera (Spanish grape) =

Variety of grape

Forastera is a white Spanish wine grape variety that is primarily grown in the Canary Islands. While it may have historically been used in sack production, now it is mostly a minor blending grape permitted in the Denominaciones de Origens (DOs) of the Canary Islands.

== Relationship to other grapes ==
In the early 21st century, DNA analysis confirmed that the Forastera grape of the Canary Islands was a completely different, and distinct variety with no close genetic relationship to the Italian Forastera grape growing on the islands of Ischia and Procida off the coast of Naples in Campania.
