= Listan Prieto =

Variety of grape

Listán Prieto (not to be confused with Listán Negro) is a red grape variety that is believed to be originated from the Castilla-La Mancha region in Spain. Listán Prieto has disappeared from Spain mainland, but there are still 29 ha planted on the Canary Islands in 2008.

In 2007, DNA fingerprinting done by the Centro Nacional de Biotecnología in Madrid, Spain discovered that the Mission grape that was widely planted in the earliest New World vineyards in the Americas was a genetic match to Listán Prieto. Despite the genetic match, there is enough clonal variation that has occurred over the centuries of geographical separation that the Mission grape of the Americas and the Listán Prieto grape of the Canary Islands are classified by the Vitis International Variety Catalogue as two separate grape varieties. Part of the variation is likely because some of earliest plantings by the Spanish missionaries were from grape seeds which are the result of pollination and sexual propagation and thus more likely to have slight differences from the parent vine than propagation through cuttings.

== History ==
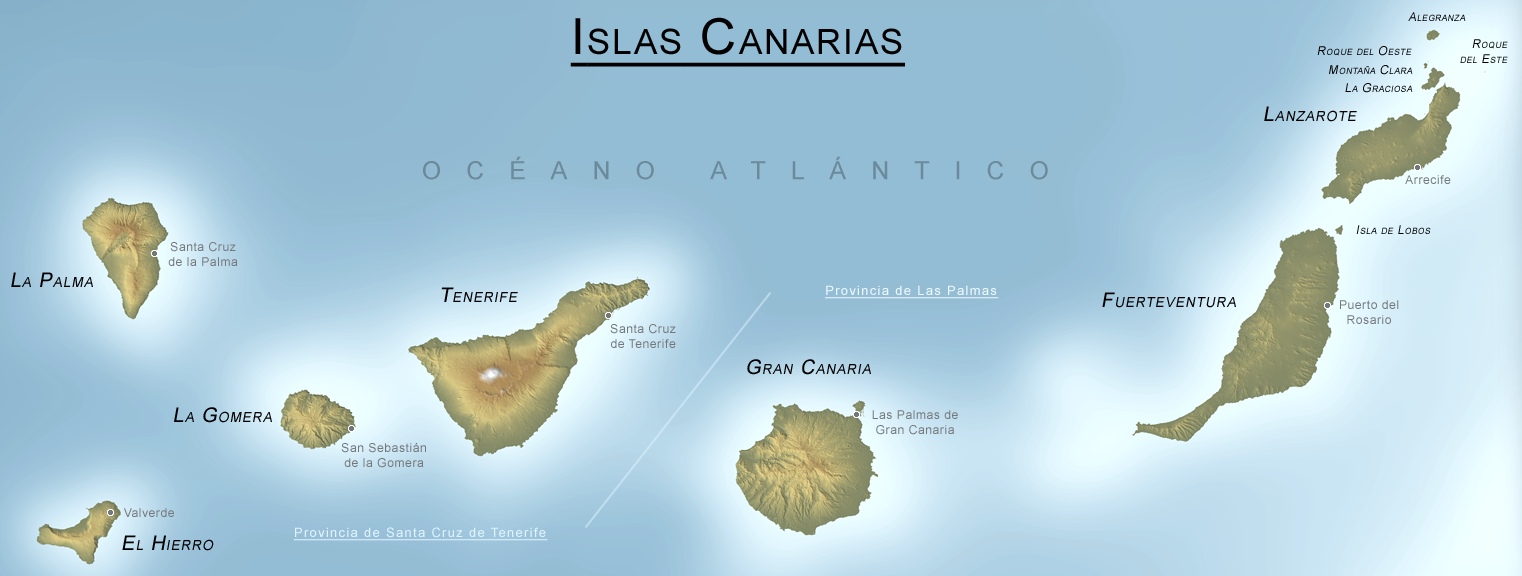
The Canary Islands are located off the coast of Africa and were an important stopover point for ships traveling from Spain to the New World.

It is thought that Listán Prieto was widely planted in the Castile region during the 16th century. Settlers to the Canary Islands brought the vines with them and eventually Listán Prieto made its way to the Spanish colonies in Mexico and Peru. From there, the grape spread throughout North and South America where it developed clonal variations that became grape varieties that are now known as Mission in California and Mexico, Pais in Chile and Criolla Chica in Argentina.

== Synonyms ==
Principal synonyms include: Criolla Chica, El Paso, Hariri, Listrão, Misión, Mission's Grape, Negra Antigua, Negra Corriente, Negra Peruana, País, Palomina Negra, Rosa del Perú, Uva Chica negra, Uva Negra, Uva Negra Vino, Uva Tinta, Viña Blanca, Viña Negra. Listán Prieto is often mistaken for Jacquez, Listán Negro and Negramoll. It can also be confused with Moscatel Negro, as Spanish Missionaries often planted it alongside Listán Prieto as they established their missions.
