= Trousseau (grape) =

Variety of grape

Trousseau Noir
- Grape (Vitis)
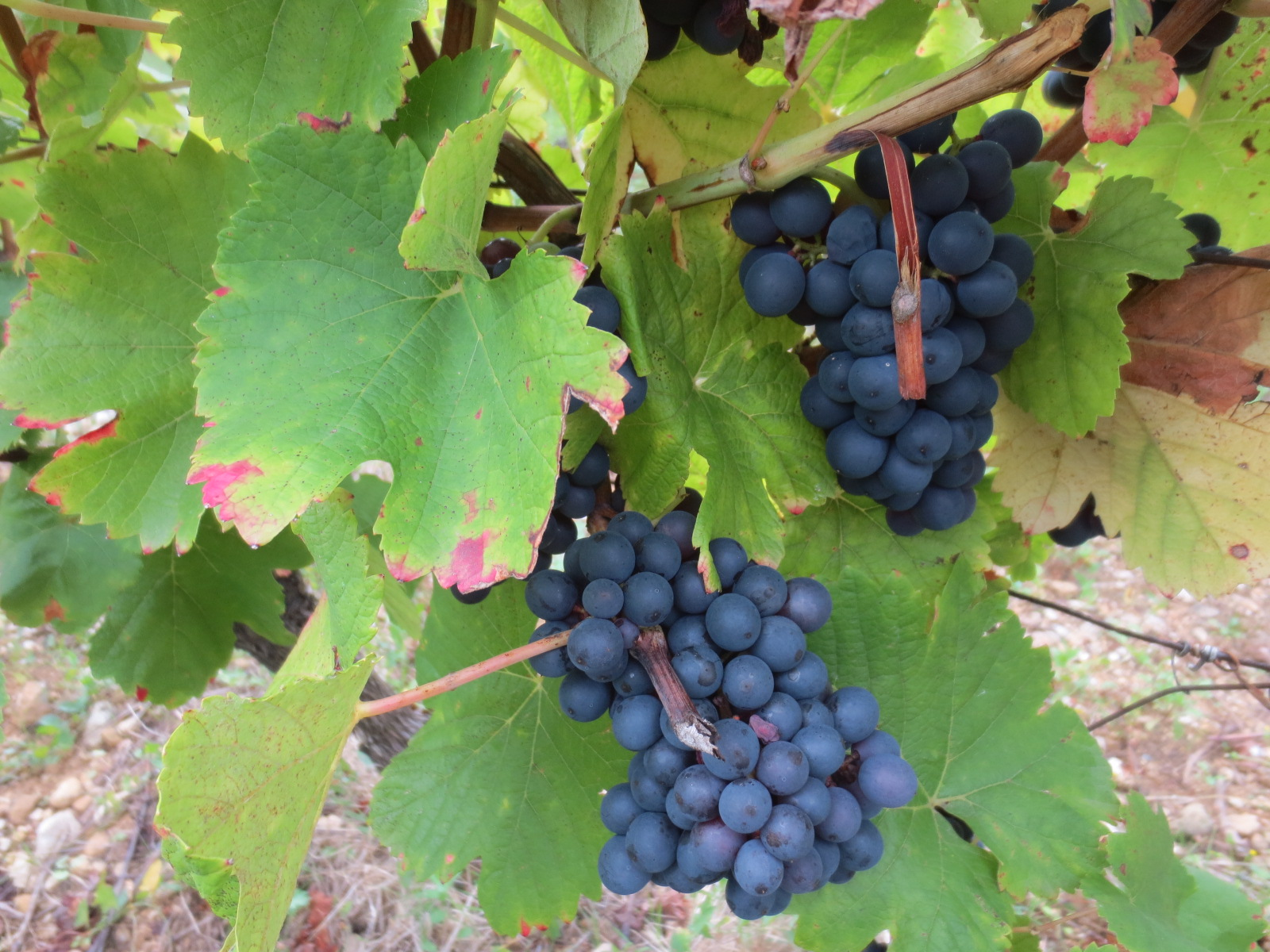
- Color of berry skin: Noir
- Species: Vitis vinifera
- Also called: Bastardo, Cabernet Gros, Trousseau Noir (more)
- Origin: Jura, France
- Notable regions: Portugal, California, Jura
- Notable wines: Port
- VIVC number: 12668

Trousseau (French pronunciation: [tʁuso]) or Trousseau Noir, also known as Bastardo and Merenzao, is an old variety of red wine grape originating in eastern France. It is grown in small amounts in many parts of Western Europe; the largest plantations are today found in Portugal, where most famously it is used in port wine. It makes deep cherry red wines with high alcohol and high, sour candy acidity, and flavours of red berry fruits, often complemented - depending on production - by a jerky nose and an organic, mossy minerality.

== History and pedigree ==
Trousseau originated in eastern France where it was once widely cultivated, and DNA profiling has indicated that the variety has a parent-offspring relationship with Savagnin, and that it is a sibling to Chenin blanc and Sauvignon blanc. DNA profiling has likewise shown that Trousseau has been cultivated on the Iberian Peninsula for at least 200 years under several different names, including Bastardo, but it is unknown how it came to be introduced there.

Trousseau gris is a white mutation of Trousseau Noir, occasionally found in Jura and once common in California under the name 'Gray Riesling'.

Genouillet is the result of a cross between Gouais blanc (Heunisch) and Bastardo.

In 1938 Harold Olmo used Trousseau to pollinate the Vitis rupestris hybrid Alicante Ganzin to produce the Royalty variety.

Bastardo was crossed with the Georgian variety Saperavi to produce the Bastardo Magarachskii variety used in the Crimea.

== Distribution and wines ==
A little is grown in Argentina and in several regions of Spain, including the Canary Islands.

=== Australia ===
There are a small number of producers of Trousseau in Australia with plantings in Tasmania, Margaret River in Western Australia (Amato Vino release a small quantity each year in the Jura style) and Barossa Valley, South Australia. A small amount is also grown in eastern Australia under the name Gros Cabernet.

=== France ===
Trousseau is one of five grape varieties allowed in the Jura wine appellations, but only covers 5% of the Jura vineyards since it requires more sun than other Jura varieties to ripe. It is often used to stiffen blends with the pale Poulsard, which is easier to cultivate. In 2009, there was a total of 172 hectares (430 acres) of Trousseau in France.

=== Portugal ===
It is part of the blend for port wine and also an important variety for red wines in the Dão. A total of 1,218 hectares (3,010 acres) of Trousseau, mostly under the name Bastardo, is cultivated in the vineyards of Portugal. It is also grown in very small quantities in Madeira, and a small number of vintage wines labelled Bastardo were made.

=== Spain ===
In Spain Trousseau is grown under the names of Merenzao, Bastardo, Bastardo Negro, María Ordoña, Maturana Tinta, Tintilla, and Verdejo Negro. It is an authorised variety in the Galician DOPS of Ribiera Sacra and Valdeorras DOPs in Galicia. It has also been included in Rioja DOCa under the name of Maturana Tinta, but it is listed as a separate variety to Trousseau / Merenzao even though they are genetically indistinct.

=== United States ===
As in Portugal, it has been historically used to make fortified wines, but nowadays also some single varietal wines. It remains a confidential variety, with only 115.6 tons crushed in 2023 in California.

== Vine and viticulture ==
It needs hot, dry conditions to do well. The name Trousseau (from Old French trusse, meaning "a bundle") is possibly a reference to the shape of the bunch: it looks 'packed up'.

== Synonyms ==
Trousseau is also known under the synonyms Abrunhal, Bastardinha, Bastardinho, Bastardo, Bastardo Do Castello, Bastardo Dos Frados, Bolonio, Capbreton Rouge, Carnaz, Chauche Noir, Cruchenton Rouge, Donzelino De Castille, Estaladiña, Graciosa, Gris De Salces, Gros Cabernet, Maria, Maria Adona, Maria Adorna, Maria Ardona, Maria Ordona, Maturana Tinta, Maturana Tinto, Maturano, Merenzano, Merenzao, Pardinho, Pecho, Pinot Gris De Rio Negro, Roibal, Sémillon Rouge, Tresseau, Triffault, Trousse, Trousseau, Trousseau Gris, Troussot, Trusiaux, Trusseau, Trussiau, Tintilla and Verdejo Tinto.

In the literature, it is often confused with Tressot.

== See also ==
- List of Port wine grapes
