= Albillo =

Variety of grape

- Grape (Vitis)
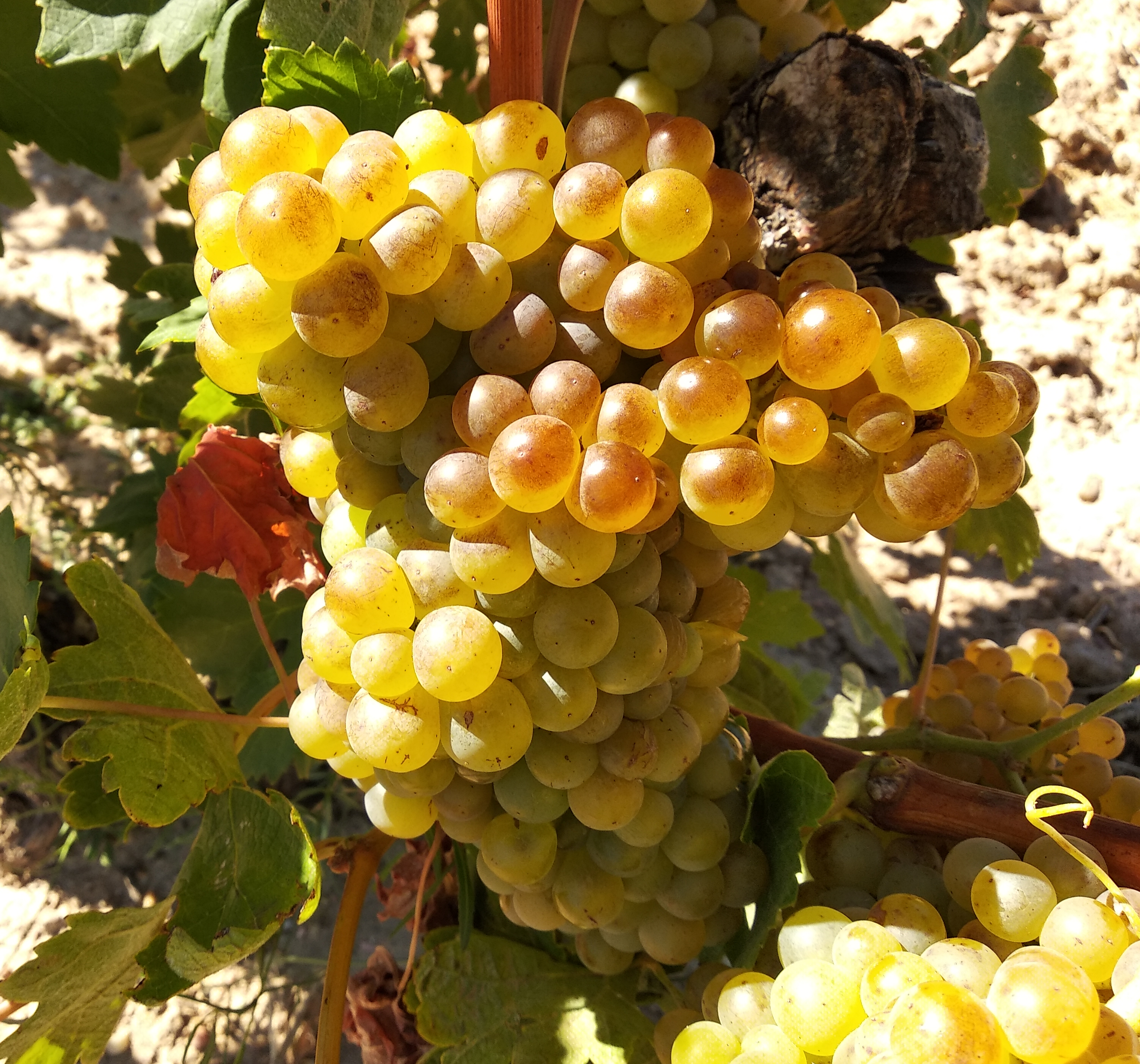
- Color of berry skin: Blanc
- Species: Vitis vinifera
- Also called: Albillo Real and other synonyms
- Origin: Spain
- Notable regions: Ribera del Duero
- VIVC number: 247

Albillo or Albillo Real is a white Spanish wine grape variety planted primarily in the Ribera del Duero region, and also in Madrid, Ávila and Galicia. The grape has mostly neutral flavors with a light perfume aroma. It has a high glycerol index which confers smoothness to the wines.

It is sometimes added to the red wines of the Ribera del Duero for added aromatics. The berries are of average size, round in shape and golden in colour. The grape bunches are generally small and compact. It is an early ripening variety and in central Spain is usually harvested in mid August.

It is an authorized variety in the Ribera del Duero region and one of the main varieties in the Vinos de Madrid DO.

== History ==
The first written mention of Albillo is from the 15th century in Agricultura General by Gabriel Alonso de Herrera in which he says that the wine made from this variety is described as “very clear, with gentle color and taste”. He also states that the wine can be kept for quite some time but that it improves in quality if mixed with other varieties such as Cigüente, Moscatel or Hebén.

Simón de Roxas Clemente y Rubio, in Viticultura, published in the 19th century mentions the sweetness of the must. According to Alain Huetz de Lemps, the Albillo variety represented 36% of all vines planted in the Toro region in 1751, and was also found in Tierras de Medina, though not as much as the Verdejo variety. He also states that Albillo was to be found in the Rioja Alta, and that it was once used for making the traditional txacolí wine in the province of Vizcaya, though today that wine is made from the Hondarrabi Zuri grape.

== Relationship to other varieties ==
Ampelographers once believed that the Sardinian wine grape Albaranzeuli Bianco, was a clone of Albillo. However, DNA profiling conducted on the grapes in 2010 confirmed that the two grapes were different varieties.

Also in 2010, ampelographers using DNA analysis discovered a parent-offspring relationship between Albillo and the Italian wine grape variety Prié blanc which was growing in the Ávila province under the name Legiruela but it is not yet clear which grape is the parent and which grape is the offspring.

== Synonyms ==
Albillo is also known by other names: Albilla, Albillo de Cebreros, Albillo de Madrid, Albillo de Toro, Albillo Castellano, Blanco del País, Castellano, Gual, Hoja Vuelta, Nieves Temprano, Pardillo, Abuela, Acerba, Acerva, Albarin blanco, Albil Prado, Albilo Kasteliano, Albillo blanco, Albillo blanco fino, Albillo Cagalon, Albillo Castilian, Albillo de Granada, Albillo de Huebla, Albillo de San Jeronimo, Albillo Dorado, Albillo Prado, Albillo Peco, Albillo Peco de Trebugena, Albillo Real, Albillo Temprano, Albillo Verdal, Albuela, Alvilla, Alvillo, Arvilla, Besto Maduro, Blanco Castellano, Blanco Pais, Blanco Ribera, Blanco Rivera, Cagalon, Cepa Canasta, Cepa de Lena, De Lena, Hogazuela, Hogomela, Nives Temprano, Ojo de Liebre, Pardillo de Albillo, Picapol, Prolifera, Temprano de Campo Real, Temprano de Mora, Uva de Lena, Uva Pardilla and Verdaguilla.

There are total of five grape varieties with 'Albillo' as part of their name: Albillo de Albacete, Albillo Krimskii, Albillo Mayor, Albillo Real, and Albillo Real de Granada. Of these, only Albillo Real is referred to as simply Albillo.

Albillo is also used as a synonym for the Spanish grape variety Pardina. Albillo Negro is one of Tempranillo's many synonyms.
