= Vigiriega =

Variety of grape

Vigiriega is a Spanish white wine grape variety that is grown in the Canary Islands (El Hierro and Tenerife) and in the province of Granada (Andalusia). It used to be more widely cultivated throughout Andalusia until the Phylloxera epidemic at the end of the 19th century.

Vigiriega is a vigorous, resistant and high producing variety; it produces few medium-sized bunches, with large, loose berries. The berries are almost round and pale green, and are also used as table grapes. The must is usually high in sugar and in acidity, and is prized for making sparkling wine.

The wines made from Vigiriega are fruity and not too aromatic, with the main notes being green apple, pear, citric fruits and fennel, depending on the ripeness.

It is also known as bujariego, diego, derijadiego, vijariego, vijiriego and vujariego.

The two varieties of Vigiriega are Vigiriega commun and the more uncommon Vigiriega negra.
