= Palomino (grape) =

Variety of grape

Palomino Fino
- Grape (Vitis)
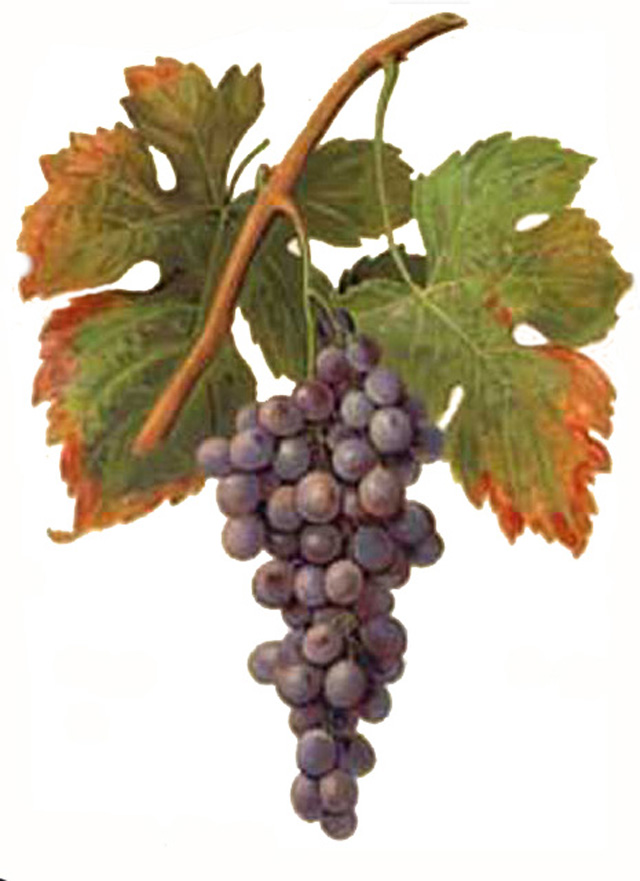
- Palomino in Viala & Vermorel
- Color of berry skin: Blanc
- Species: Vitis vinifera
- Also called: Listán, White French, Fransdruif, among others
- Origin: Spain
- Notable wines: Sherry
- VIVC number: 8888

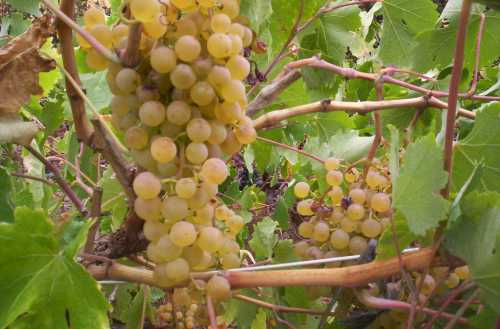
Palomino grapes growing in the Canary Islands where they are known as Listan Blanco

Palomino Fino is a white grape widely grown in Spain and South Africa, and best known for its use in the manufacture of sherry. It is also grown in the Douro region of Portugal where it is used for table and fortified wines.

== Wine regions ==
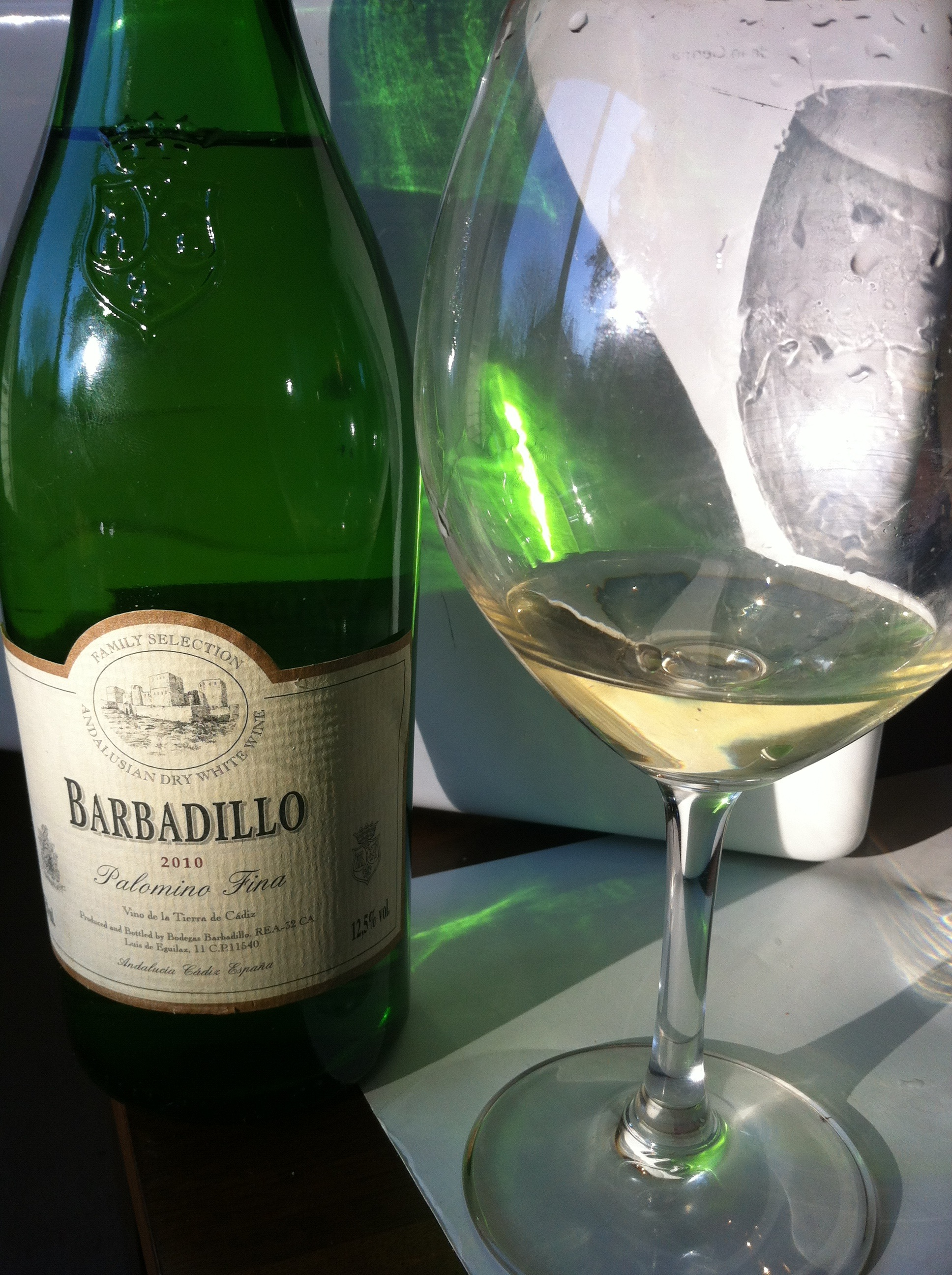
A non-fortified dry white wine made from Palomino in the Andalusia region of Spain.

In Spain, the grape is split into the sub-varieties Palomino Fino, Palomino Basto, and Palomino de Jerez, of which Palomino Fino is by far the most important, being the principal grape used in the manufacture of sherry. The wine formed by fermentation of the grape is low in both acidity and sugar which, whilst suitable for sherry, ensures that any table wine made from it is of a consistently low quality, unless aided by acidification. It is the fourth most common white grape variety grown in Spain, with 20,261 hectares (50,066 acres) in 2015. There are substantial plantings in Andalusia for sherry production, and it is also widely grown on the Canary Islands, and in Galicia.

In France, it is referred to as Listán, and in South Africa as Fransdruif or White French. It is also found in Australia and California where it is also used mainly to produce fortified wines. The grape was once thought to be the Golden Chasselas, a grape grown in California. The wine-must has tendency to oxidise quickly, a characteristic that can be ignored when used for sherry production.
