= Tinta Negra Mole =

Variety of grape

- Grape (Vitis)
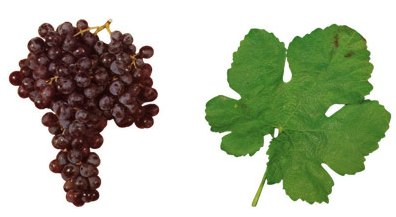
- Color of berry skin: Noir
- Species: Vitis vinifera
- Also called: See list of synonyms
- Pedigree parent 1: Hebén
- Formation of seeds: Complete
- Sex of flowers: Hermaphrodite
- VIVC number: 7901

Tinta Negra Mole is a red Portuguese wine grape commonly used in the production of Madeira. It is the most widely planted variety on the Madeira islands and is considered the industry's "workhorse grape".

The grape produces very high yields of sweet, pale red wine, but is also often fermented without skin contact to produce white wine when making drier varieties of Madeira.

== Synonyms ==
Boxo, Duhamelii, Listan Morado, Listan Negro, Listan Prieto, Molar, Mollar, Mollar De Cadiz, Mollar De Granada, Mollar De Huelva, Mollar Morado, Mollar Negro, Mollar Prieto, Mollar Sevillano, Mollar Zucari, Mollis, Mollissima, Morisca, Negra Mole, Negra Mole Tinta, Negramoll, Pascoal Gomes, Sabra Molle, San Francisco, Tinta Mole, Tinta Molle, Tinta Negra, Tinta Negra Mole, Tinta Sabreirinha, Tinta Sobreirinha
