= List of wine-producing regions =

Wine production in 2022

Wines are produced in significant growing regions where vineyards are planted. Wine grapes berries mostly grow between the 30th and the 50th degrees of latitude, in both the Northern and Southern Hemispheres, typically in regions of Mediterranean climate. Grapes will sometimes grow beyond this range, thus minor amounts of wine are made in some rather unexpected places.

As of 2021, the five largest producers of wine in the world were, in order, Italy, France, Spain, the United States, and China.

== Countries ==
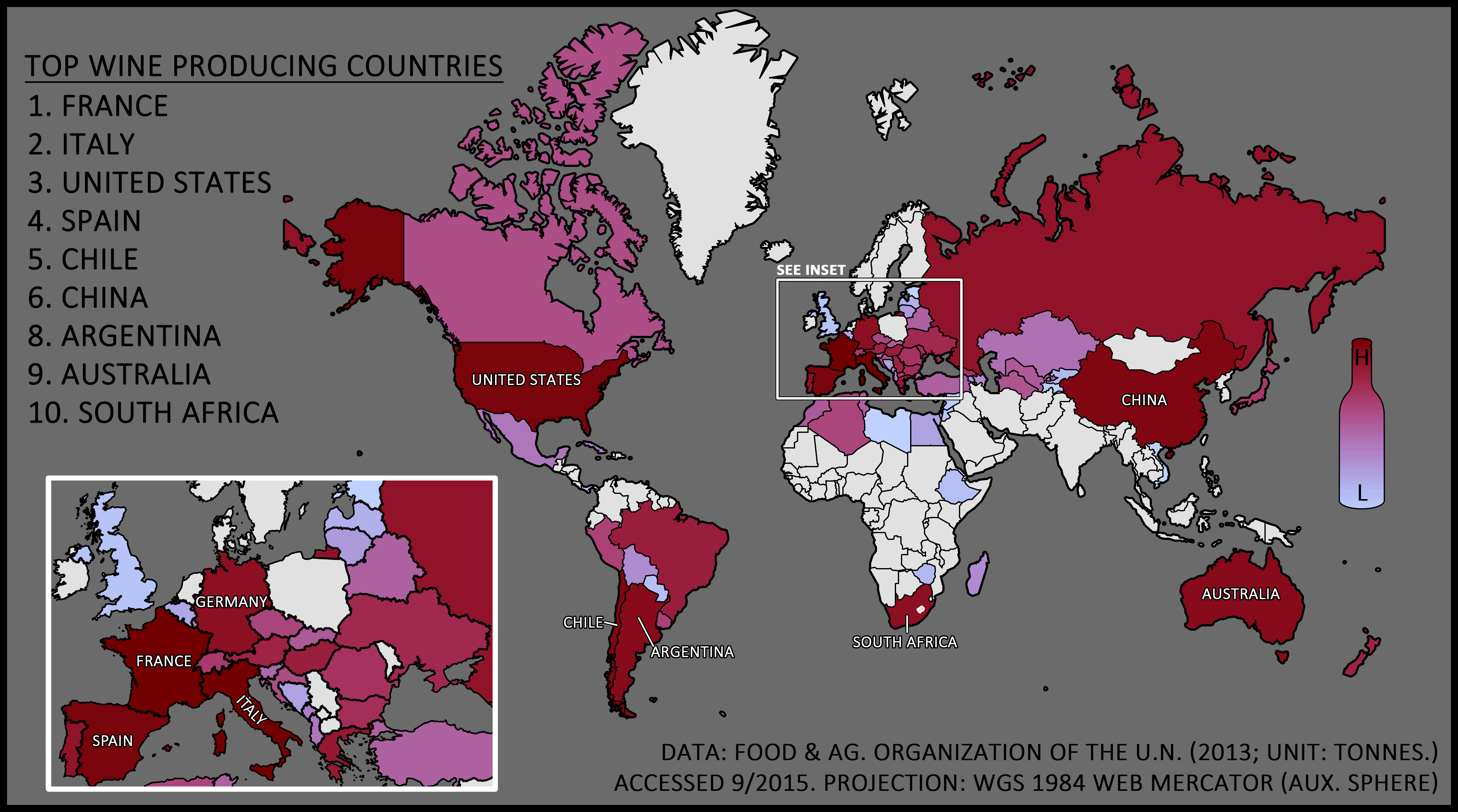
Map of global wine production in 2013

2021 data from the Food and Agriculture Organization (FAO) show a total worldwide production of 27 million tonnes of wine with the top 15 producing countries accounting for over 90% of the total.

Wine production by country in 2021
Country	Production (tonnes)
Italy	5,088,500
France	3,713,200
Spain	3,700,588
United States	2,057,021
China	1,814,400
Australia	1,482,000
Chile	1,343,729
Argentina	1,248,155
South Africa	1,133,300
Portugal	718,547
Romania	530,000
Germany	452,693
Russia	450,000
Brazil	348,449
Hungary	310,000
Greece	290,000
Turkey	266,962
New Zealand	266,400
Austria	246,000
Moldova	167,500
Georgia	119,617
North Macedonia	93,600
Bulgaria	82,300
Peru	81,000
Uruguay	74,865
Ukraine	68,470
Croatia	66,000
Canada	65,357
Switzerland	60,904
Czech Republic	59,000
Turkmenistan	52,098
Japan	49,473
Mexico	43,268
Morocco	43,083
Tunisia	28,000
Serbia	26,550
Belarus	26,430
Kazakhstan	23,343
Vietnam	18,153
Belgium	17,496
Uzbekistan	16,899
Armenia	12,829
Slovenia	10,192
Azerbaijan	10,116
Montenegro	10,022
Luxembourg	9,800
Cyprus	8,900
Bolivia	8,400
Madagascar	7,791
Slovakia	7,711
Bosnia and Herzegovina	5,677
Egypt	4,775
Saint Lucia	4,449
Lithuania	4,143
Mauritius	3,166
Colombia	2,606
Albania	2,587
Latvia	2,569
Kyrgyzstan	2,316
Estonia	2,088
Israel	2,020
Paraguay	1,981
Lebanon	932
Jordan	557
Thailand	461
Mongolia	371
United Kingdom	354
Tajikistan	182
Panama	108

== Africa ==
=== Algeria ===
- Algiers
- Béjaïa
- Chlef Province
  - Dahra
- Mascara
- Médéa
- Tlemcen
- Zaccar

=== Cape Verde ===
- Chã das Caldeiras

=== Morocco ===
- Atlas Mountains
- Benslimane
- Meknès

=== South Africa ===
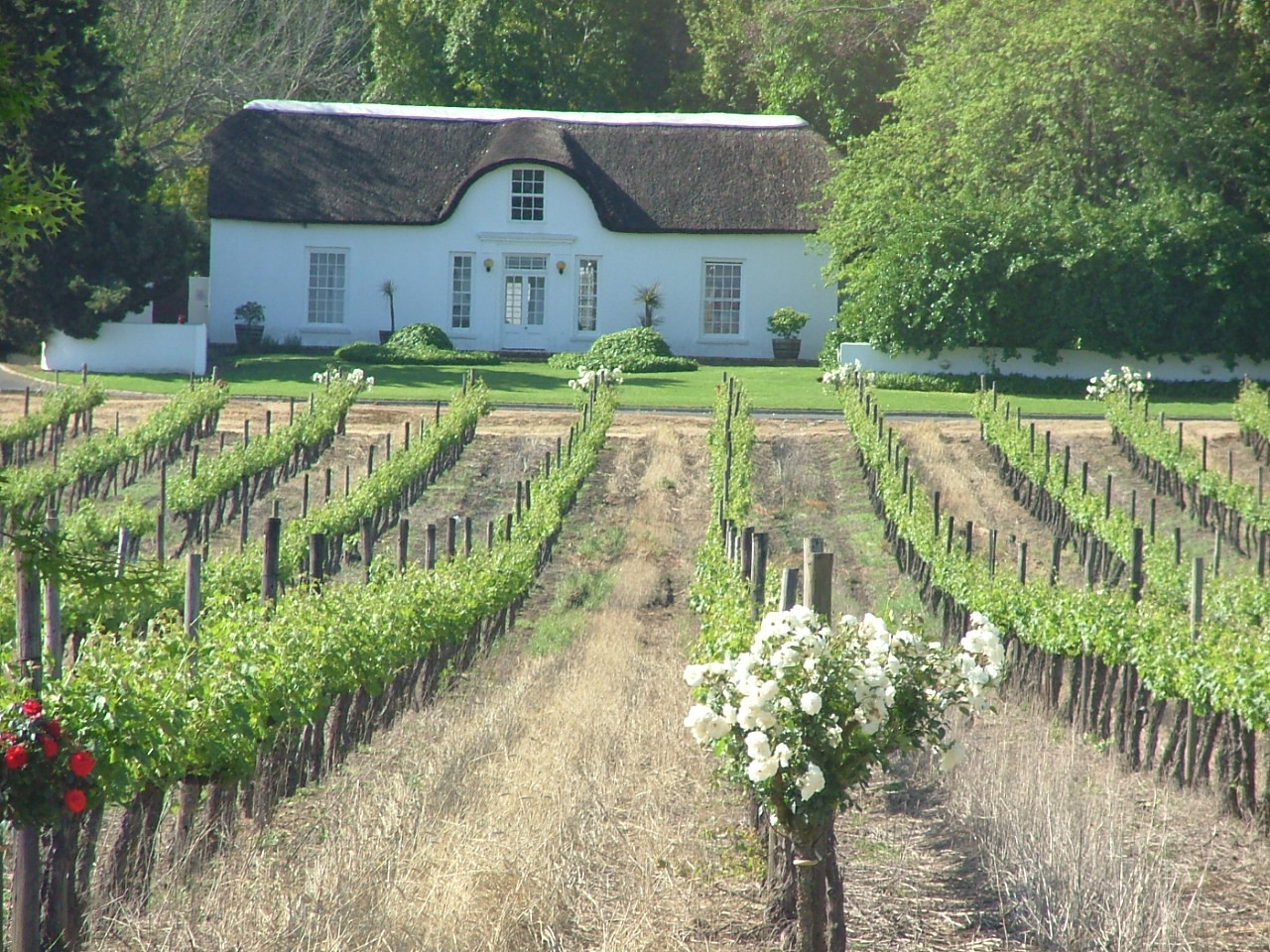
A vineyard in the Stellenbosch region, South Africa

- Breede River Valley
- Constantia
- Durbanville
- Elgin
- Elim
- Franschhoek
- Little Karoo
- Orange River Valley
- Paarl
- Robertson
- Stellenbosch
- Swartland
- Tulbagh

=== Tunisia ===
- Arianah
- Nabul
- Sousse

== South America ==
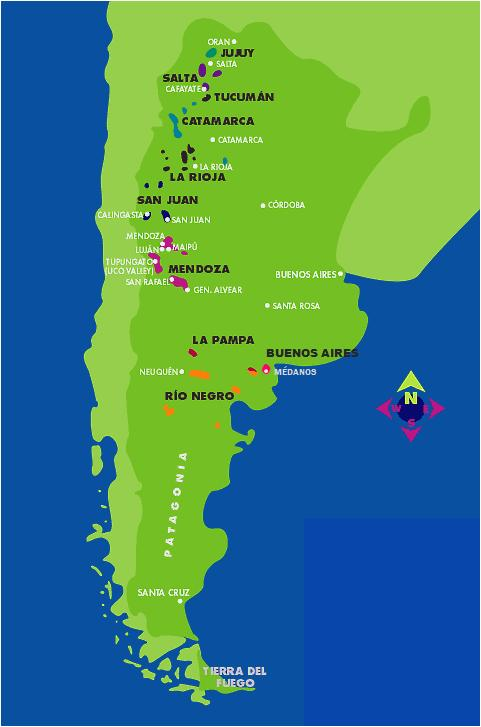
Argentine wine regions

=== Argentina ===
- Buenos Aires Province
  - Médanos
- Catamarca Province
- La Rioja Province
- Mendoza Province
- Neuquén Province
- Río Negro Province
- Salta Province
  - Cafayate
- San Juan Province

=== Bolivia ===
The location of the main wine regions of Bolivia.
- Cinti Valley
- Cotagaita Valley
- Samaipata Valley
- Central Valley of Tarija
- Valle de la Concepción

=== Brazil ===
- Bahia
  - Curaçá
  - Irecê
  - Juazeiro
- Mato Grosso
  - Nova Mutum
- Minas Gerais
  - Andradas
  - Caldas
  - Pirapora
  - Santa Rita de Caldas
- Paraná
  - Bandeirantes
  - Marialva
  - Maringá
  - Rosário do Avaí
- Pernambuco
  - Casa Nova
  - Petrolina
  - Santa Maria da Boa Vista
- Rio Grande do Sul
  - Bento Gonçalves
  - Caxias do Sul
  - Cotiporã
  - Farroupilha
  - Flores da Cunha
  - Garibaldi
  - Pinto Bandeira
- Santa Catarina
  - Pinheiro Preto
  - São Joaquim
  - Tangará
- São Paulo
  - Jundiaí
  - São Roque

=== Chile ===
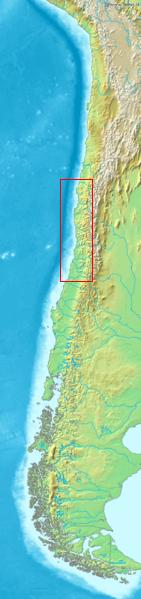
Chile's topography with the location of most of Chile's wine regions highlighted

- Aconcagua
  - Aconcagua Valley
  - Casablanca Valley
- Atacama
  - Copiapó Valley
  - Huasco Valley
- Central Valley
  - Cachapoal Valley
  - Maipo Valley
  - Mataquito Valley
  - Maule Valley
- Coquimbo
  - Choapa Valley
  - Elqui Valley
  - Limarí
- Pica – a wine-producing oasis before the Chilenization of Tarapacá
- Southern Chile
  - Bío-Bío Valley
  - Itata Valley
  - Malleco Valley
  - Bueno Valley and Ranco Lake

=== Colombia ===
- Villa de Leyva
- Valle del Cauca
  - La Unión

=== Peru ===
- Arequipa region valleys
- Huaral District and Cañete Province – both in Lima Region; formerly in Surco were vineyards that have disappeared due to urban expansion
- Ica Region – including Chincha, Pisco and Ica valleys
- Pica – a wine-producing oasis before the Chilenization of Tarapacá

=== Uruguay ===
- Montevideo
- Canelones
- Maldonado
  - Garzón
  - José Ignacio
- Colonia
- San José

=== Venezuela ===
The wine-producing enterprise for Venezuela can be found here.

- Carora, Lara State

== North America ==
=== Canada ===
- British Columbia
  - Fraser Valley (VQA defined viticultural area)
  - Gulf Islands (VQA defined viticultural area)
  - Okanagan Valley (VQA defined viticultural area)
  - Similkameen Valley (VQA defined viticultural area)
  - Thompson Valley (wine region) (VQA defined viticultural area)
  - Vancouver Island (VQA defined viticultural area)
- Nova Scotia
  - Annapolis Valley
- Ontario
  - Lake Erie North Shore and Pelee Island (VQA defined viticultural area)
  - Niagara Peninsula (VQA defined viticultural area)
  - Prince Edward County (VQA defined viticultural area)
  - Toronto
- Quebec
  - Eastern Townships

=== Costa Rica ===
- Valle Central
  - Santa Ana
  - La Garita
- Dota
  - Copey de Dota

=== Mexico ===
- Aguascalientes
  - Aguascalientes Valley
- Baja California
  - Valle de Guadalupe
    - Valle de Calafia
    - Valle de Mexicali
    - Valle de San Vicente
    - Valle de Santo Tomás
    - Zona Tecate
- Coahuila / Durango, collectively known as La Laguna wine region
  - Valle de Parras
- Guanajuato
  - Guanajuato City
  - San Miguel de Allende
  - Dolores Hidalgo
  - San Felipe
  - Salvatierra
  - San Francisco del Rincón
- Hidalgo
- Nuevo León
  - Valle de Las Maravillas
- Querétaro (Vinos de la Región Vitivinícola de Querétaro, first Mexican IGP)
  - Valle de Tequisquiapan
- Sonora
  - Caborca
  - Hermosillo
- Zacatecas
  - Valle de las Arcinas

=== United States ===
- Arizona
- California
  - Central Coast AVA
    - Livermore Valley AVA
    - Paso Robles AVA
    - York Mountain AVA
  - Central Valley
    - Lodi AVA
  - North Coast AVA
    - Mendocino AVA
    - Napa Valley AVA
    - Sonoma County
  - Sierra Foothills AVA
  - South Coast AVA
- Colorado
- Idaho
- Michigan
- Missouri
- New Jersey
- New Mexico
- New York
  - Finger Lakes AVA
  - Hudson River Region AVA
  - Long Island AVA
- Oregon
  - Willamette Valley AVA
- Pennsylvania
- Texas
  - Texas High Plains AVA
  - Texas Hill Country AVA
  - Trans-Pecos
- Virginia
- Washington
  - Columbia Valley AVA

== Europe ==
=== Albania ===
- Berat
- Korça
- Leskovik
- Lezhë
- Përmet
- Shkoder
- Tirana County

=== Andorra ===
- Ordino
- Sant Julià de Lòria

=== Armenia ===
- Aragatsotn Province
- Ararat Province
- Armavir Province
- Gegharkunik Province
- Kotayk Province
- Shirak Province
- Syunik Province
- Tavush Province
- Vayots Dzor Province
- Yerevan
- Republic of Artsakh

=== Austria ===
- Burgenland
- Northeastern and eastern Lower Austria
  - Kamptal
  - Kremstal
  - Wachau
  - Wagram
  - Weinviertel
- Southern Styria
- Vienna and surrounding area

=== Azerbaijan ===
- Ganja-Qazakh
- Shirvan

=== Belarus ===
- Brest
- Gomel
- Minsk

=== Belgium ===
- Côtes de Sambre et Meuse, between the rivers Sambre et Meuse, since 2004
- Hagelandse wijn, near Rotselaar/Leuven, since 1997
- Haspengouw, Limburg, since 2000
- Heuvelland, since 2005
- Province of Brabant area
- Hainaut area
- Liège area
- Namur area

=== Bosnia and Herzegovina ===
- Čapljina
- Čitluk
- Ljubuški
- Međugorje
- Mostar
- Stolac
- Trebinje

=== Bulgaria ===
- Black Sea region
- Danubian Plain
- Rose Valley
- Thrace
- Valley of the Struma River

=== Croatia ===
- Continental Croatia: Central Croatia and Slavonia
  - Moslavina
  - Plešivica
  - Podunavlje
  - Pokuplje
  - Prigorje – Bilogora
  - Slavonia
  - Zagorje – Međimurje
- Littoral Croatia: Northern Croatian Littoral and Dalmatia
  - Croatian Coast (Hrvatsko primorje)
  - Dalmatian Interior (Dalmatinska zagora)
  - Central and South Dalmatia (Srednja i Južna Dalmacija)
  - Northern Dalmatia (Sjeverna Dalmacija)
  - Istria (Istra)

=== Cyprus ===
- Commandaria
- Laona – Akamas
- Vouni Panagias – Ambelitis
- Krasochoria Lemesou
- Pitsilia
- Diarizos Valley

=== Czech Republic ===
- Moravia
  - Mikulov – Mikulovska wine
  - Slovácko
  - Velké Pavlovice
  - Znojmo
- Bohemia
  - Litoměřice
  - Mělník
- Prague
  - Gazebo at Gröbe's Villa
  - St. Clare's
  - St. Wenceslas' Vineyard at Prague castle
  - Salabka, Troja

=== Estonia ===
- West Estonian archipelago area
- Viljandi area
- Võru area

=== France ===
Map of wine regions in France

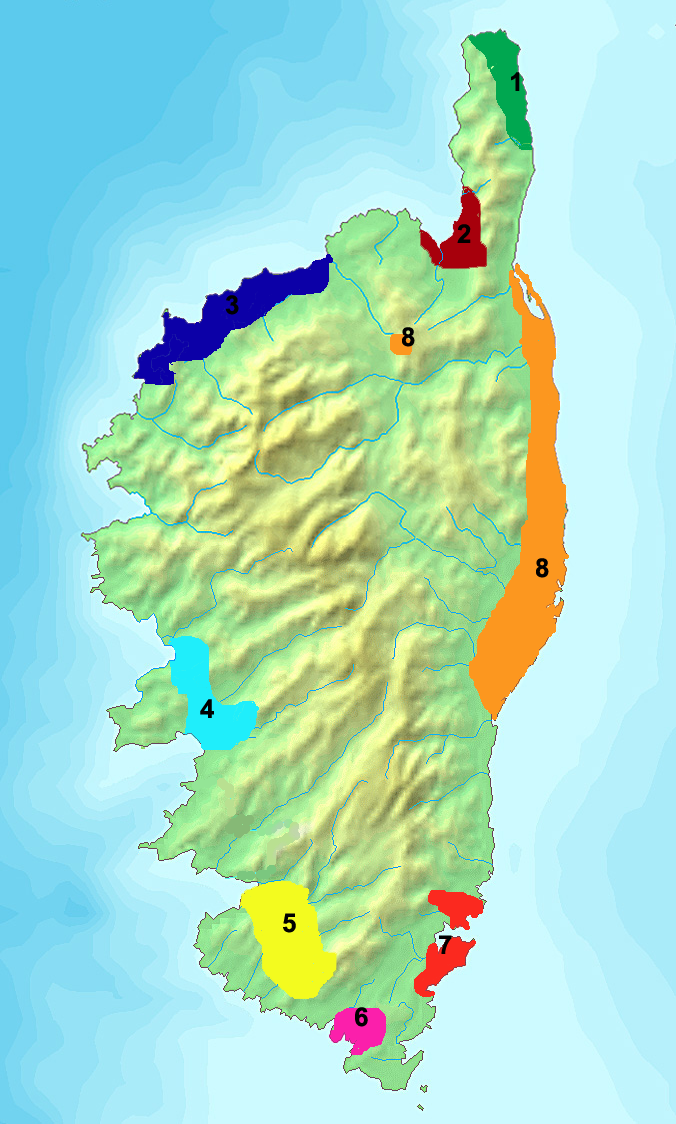
Corsica's wine regions: (1) Cap Corse, (2) Patrimonio, (3) Calvi, (4) Ajaccio, (5) Sartène, (6) Figari, (7) Porto-Vecchio, (8) Greater Vin de Corse region. The Muscat du Cap Corse region overlaps with part of the Cap Corse and Patrimonio regions.

- Alsace – Alsace wine
- Bordeaux – Bordeaux wine
  - Barsac
  - Entre-Deux-Mers
  - Fronsac
  - Graves
  - Haut-Médoc
  - Margaux
  - Médoc
  - Pauillac
  - Pessac-Léognan
  - Pomerol
  - Saint-Émilion
  - Saint-Estèphe
  - Saint-Julien
  - Sauternes – Sauternes
- Burgundy (Bourgogne) – Burgundy wine
  - Beaujolais
  - Bugey
  - Chablis
  - Côte Chalonnaise
  - Côte d'Or
    - Côte de Beaune
      - Aloxe-Corton
      - Auxey-Duresses
      - Beaune
      - Chassagne-Montrachet
      - Meursault
      - Santenay
    - Côte de Nuits
      - Chambolle-Musigny
      - Gevrey-Chambertin
      - Nuits-Saint-Georges
      - Vosne-Romanée
  - Mâconnais
    - Pouilly-Fuissé
- Champagne – Champagne
- Corsica
  - Ajaccio
  - Cap Course
  - Patrimonio
  - Vin de Corse
    - Calvi
    - Figari
    - Porto-Vecchio
    - Sartène
- Jura – Jura wine
- Languedoc-Roussillon
  - Banyuls
  - Blanquette de Limoux
  - Cabardès
  - Collioure
  - Corbières
  - Côtes du Roussillon
  - Fitou
  - Maury
  - Minervois
  - Rivesaltes
- Loire Valley – Loire Valley (wine region)
  - Anjou – Saumur
  - Cognac
  - Muscadet
  - Pouilly-Fumé
  - Sancerre
  - Touraine
- Lorraine
- Madiran
- Provence
- Rhône – Rhône wine
  - Beaumes-de-Venise
  - Château-Grillet
  - Châteauneuf-du-Pape
  - Condrieu
  - Cornas
  - Côte du Rhône-Villages, Rhône wine
  - Côte-Rôtie
  - Côtes du Rhône
  - Crozes-Hermitage
  - Gigondas
  - Hermitage
  - St. Joseph
  - Saint-Péray
  - Vacqueyras
- Savoy

=== Georgia ===
- Abkhazia
- Kakheti, containing the micro-regions Telavi and Kvareli
- Kartli
- Imereti
- Racha-Lechkhumi and Kvemo Svaneti

=== Germany ===
The German wine regions

- Ahr
- Baden
- Franconia (Franken)
- Hessische Bergstraße
- Mittelrhein
- Mosel
- Nahe
- Palatinate (Pfalz)
- Rheingau
- Rheinhessen
- Saale-Unstrut
- Saxony (Sachsen)
- Württemberg

=== Greece ===
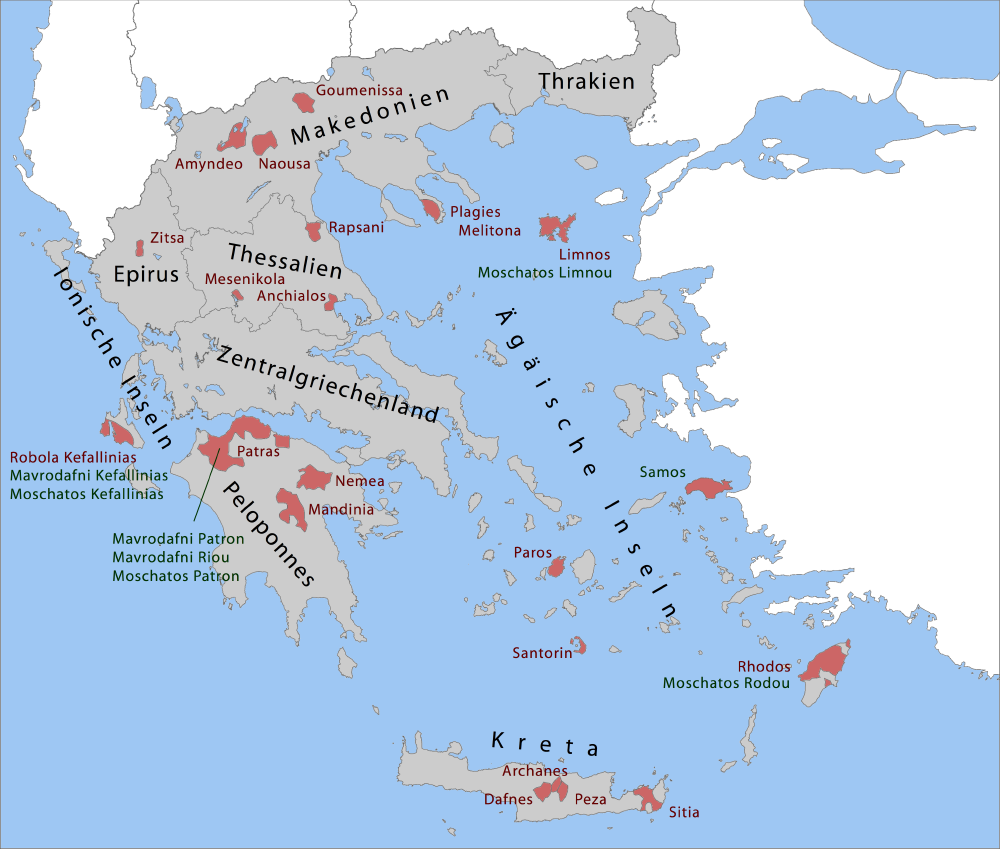
Greek wine regions

- Aegean islands
  - Crete
  - Limnos
  - Paros
  - Rhodes
  - Samos
  - Santorini
- Central Greece
  - Attica
  - Epirus
    - Zitsa
  - Thessaly
    - Nea Anchialos
    - Rapsani
- Ionian Islands
  - Kefalonia
- Macedonia
  - Amyntaion
  - Goumenissa
  - Naousa, Imathia
- Peloponnesus
  - Mantineia
  - Nemea
  - Patras

=== Hungary ===
Wine regions in Hungary

- Balaton
  - Badacsony
  - Balaton-felvidék
  - Balatonboglár
  - Balatonfüred-Csopak
  - Nagy-Somló
  - Zala
- Duna
  - Csongrád
  - Hajós-Baja
  - Kunság
- Eger
  - Bükk
  - Eger
  - Észak-Dunántúl
  - Etyek-Buda
  - Mátra
  - Mór
  - Neszmély
  - Pannonhalma
- Pannon
  - Pécs
  - Szekszárd
  - Tolna
  - Villány
- Sopron
- Tokaj

=== Ireland ===
- Cork

=== Italy ===
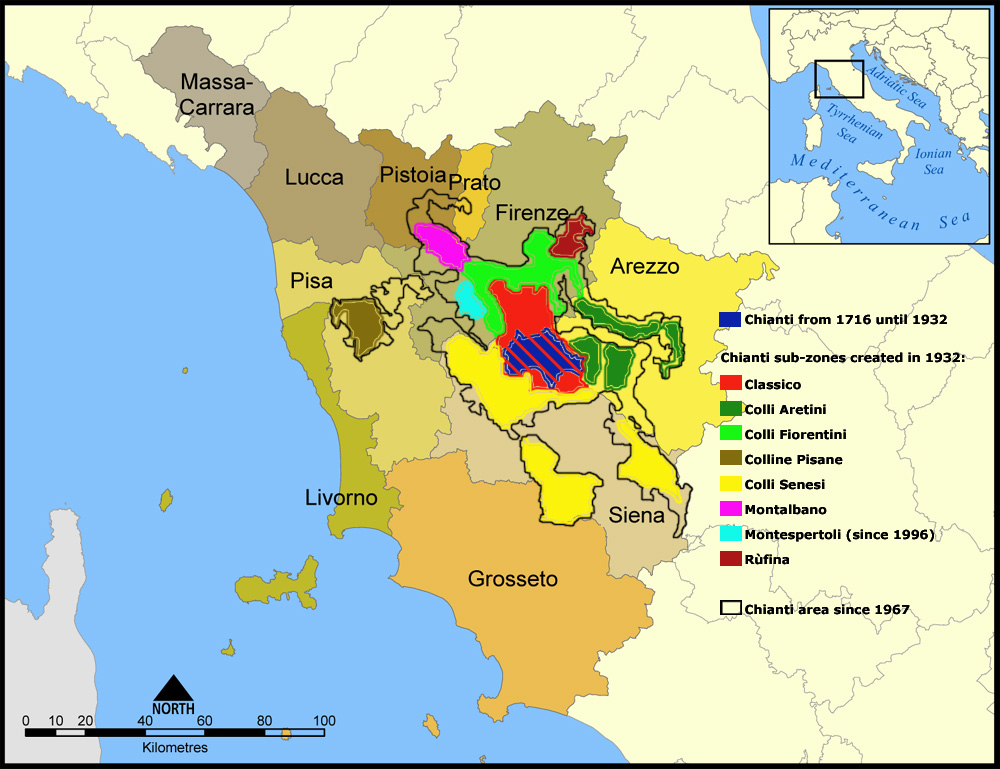
"Chianti" areas in Tuscany

- Abruzzo
  - Montepulciano d'Abruzzo
  - Trebbiano d'Abruzzo
  - Terre Tollesi
  - Cerasuolo d'Abruzzo
- Apulia
  - Bianco di Locorotondo e Martina Franca
  - Primitivo di Manduria
- Calabria
  - Bivongi
  - Cirò
  - Gaglioppo
  - Greco di Bianco
  - Lamezia
  - Melissa
  - Aant'Anna di Isola Capo Rizzuto
  - Savuto
  - Scavigna
  - Terre di Cosenza
- Campania
  - Avellino
    - Aglianico
    - Falanghina
    - Fiano
    - Greco di Tufo
  - Benevento
    - Aglianico
    - Falanghina
    - Solopaca
  - Caserta
  - Naples
  - Salerno
- Emilia-Romagna
  - Colli Cesenate
  - Sangiovese Superiore di Romagna
  - Trebbiano di Romagna
- Liguria
  - Cinque Terre
- Lombardy
  - Franciacorta
  - Oltrepò Pavese
- Marche
  - Castelli di Jesi
  - Conero
  - Piceno
- Piedmont
  - Acqui
  - Alba
  - Asti
  - Barolo
  - Colli Tortonesi
  - Gattinara
  - Gavi
  - Ghemme
  - Langhe
  - Monferrato
  - Nizza
  - Ovada
- Sardinia
  - Cagliari
  - Cannonau
  - Monti
  - Nuragus
  - Ogliastra
  - Vermentino di Gallura
- Sicily
  - Val Demone wine
    - Etna
  - Val di Noto wine
    - Cerasuolo di Vittoria
    - Noto
  - Val di Mazara wine
    - Alcamo
    - Erice
    - Marsala
    - Pantelleria
- Trentino-Alto Adige
  - South Tyrol, known alternatively as Südtirol (in German) or Alto Adige (in Italian)
  - Trentino
- Tuscany
  - Bolgheri
  - Chianti
  - Chianti Classico
  - Colli Apuani
  - Colli Etruria Centrale
  - Colline Lucchesi
  - Elba
  - Montalcino
  - Montescudaio
  - Parrina
  - Pitigliano
  - San Gimignano
  - Scansano
  - Val di Chiana
  - Val di Cornia
  - Valdinievole
  - Valle di Arbia
- Umbria
  - Montefalco
  - Orvieto
  - Torgiano
- Veneto
  - Arcole
  - Bagnoli
  - Bardolino
  - Bianco di Custoza
  - Breganze
  - Colli Berici
  - Colli di Conegliano
  - Colli Euganei
  - Gambellara
  - Garda
  - Lessini Durello
  - Lison Pramaggiore
  - Lugana
  - Montgello e Colli Asolani
  - Piave
  - Prosecco
  - Soave
  - Valdadige
  - Valpolicella

=== Kosovo ===
- Gjakova
- Leposavić
- Lipjan
- Malisheva
- Prizren
- Rahovec

=== Latvia ===
- Sabile
- Courland area
- Semigallia area

=== Lithuania ===
- Anykščių vynas – Anykščiai area
- Mėmelio vynas – Priekulė area

=== Luxembourg ===
- Moselle Valley

=== Malta ===
- Malta
- Gozo

=== Moldova ===
- Bardar
- Codri
- Cricova
- Hîncești
- Purcari

=== Montenegro ===
- Crmnica
- Plantaže, near Podgorica

=== Netherlands ===
- Groesbeek
- Gelderland
- Limburg

=== North Macedonia ===
- Povardarie
- Skopsko vinogorje
- Tikveš

=== Norway ===
- Mostly Viken and Vestfold og Telemark
- Sognefjord

=== Poland ===
- Dolny Śląsk
- Kazimierz Dolny
- Małopolska
- Podkarpacie
- Warka, near Warsaw
- Zielona Góra

=== Portugal ===
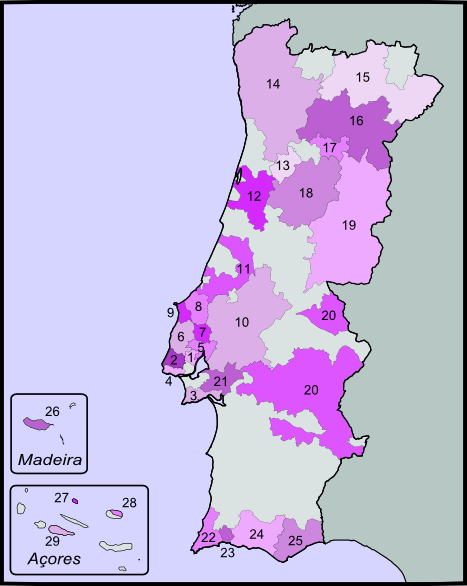
Portuguese wine regions

- Alentejo
- Bairrada
- Bucelas
- Carcavelos
- Colares
- Dão
- Lagoa
- Lagos
- Madeira
- Portimão
- Porto e Douro
- Setúbal
- Tavira
- Vinhos Verdes

=== Romania ===
- Banat wine regions:
  - Arad
  - Jamu Mare
  - Măderat
  - Miniș
  - Moldova Nouă
  - Recaș
  - Silagiu
  - Teremia
  - Tirol
- Crișana wine regions:
  - Diosig
  - Săcuieni
  - Sâniob
  - Sanislău
  - Valea lui Mihai
- Dobrogea wine regions:
  - Adamclisi
  - Aliman
  - Babadag
  - Băneasa
  - Cernavodă
  - Chirnogeni
  - Dăeni
  - Hârșova
  - Istria
  - Măcin
  - Medgidia
  - Murfatlar
  - Oltina
  - Ostrov, Constanța
  - Ostrov, Tulcea
  - Poarta Albă
  - Sarica-Niculițel
  - Simioc
  - Tulcea
  - Valea Dacilor
  - Valea Nucarilor
  - Valu lui Traian
- Moldavia wine regions:
  - Berești
  - Bohotin
  - Cotești
  - Colinele Tutovei
  - Comarna
  - Copou
  - Corod
  - Cotnari
  - Covurlui
  - Cucuteni
  - Dealu Morii
  - Dealul Bujorului
  - Hârlău
  - Hlipicani
  - Huși
  - Iași
  - Ivești
  - Jariștea
  - Nămoloasa
  - Nicorești
  - Odobești
  - Panciu
  - Păunești
  - Probota
  - Tănăsoaia
  - Târgu Frumos
  - Tecuci
  - Țifești
  - Tomești
  - Vaslui
  - Zeletin
- Muntenia wine regions:
  - Seciu
  - Breaza
  - Cricov
  - Dealu Mare
  - Dealurile Buzăului
  - Pietroasa
  - Râmnicu Sărat
  - Șercaia
  - Ștefănești
  - Tohani
  - Topoloveni
  - Urlați–Ceptura
  - Valea Călugărească
  - Valea Mare
  - Zărnești
  - Zorești
- Oltenia wine regions:
  - Banu Mărăcine
  - Calafat
  - Cetate
  - Corcova
  - Dăbuleni
  - Dealul Viilor
  - Dealurile Craiovei
  - Drăgășani
  - Golul Drincei
  - Greaca
  - Iancu Jianu
  - Izvoarele
  - Orevița
  - Plaiurile Drâncei
  - Plenița
  - Podgoria Dacilor
  - Podgoria Severinului
  - Poiana Mare
  - Potelu
  - Sadova-Corabia
  - Sâmburești
  - Segarcea
  - Tâmburești
  - Vânju Mare
  - Zimnicea
- Transylvania wine regions:
  - Aiud
  - Alba Iulia
  - Bistrița
  - Blaj
  - Ighiu
  - Jidvei
  - Lechința
  - Mediaș
  - Șamșud
  - Sebeș-Apold
  - Șimleu Silvaniei
  - Târnave
  - Târnăveni
  - Teaca
  - Triteni
  - Valea Nirajului

=== Russia ===
- Caucasus
- Krasnodar
- Stavropol

=== Serbia ===
Wine regions of Serbia

- Banat region
- Nišava – South Morava region
- Pocerina region
- Srem region
- Subotica – Horgoš region
- Šumadija – Great Morava region
- Timok Valley
- West Morava region

=== Slovakia ===
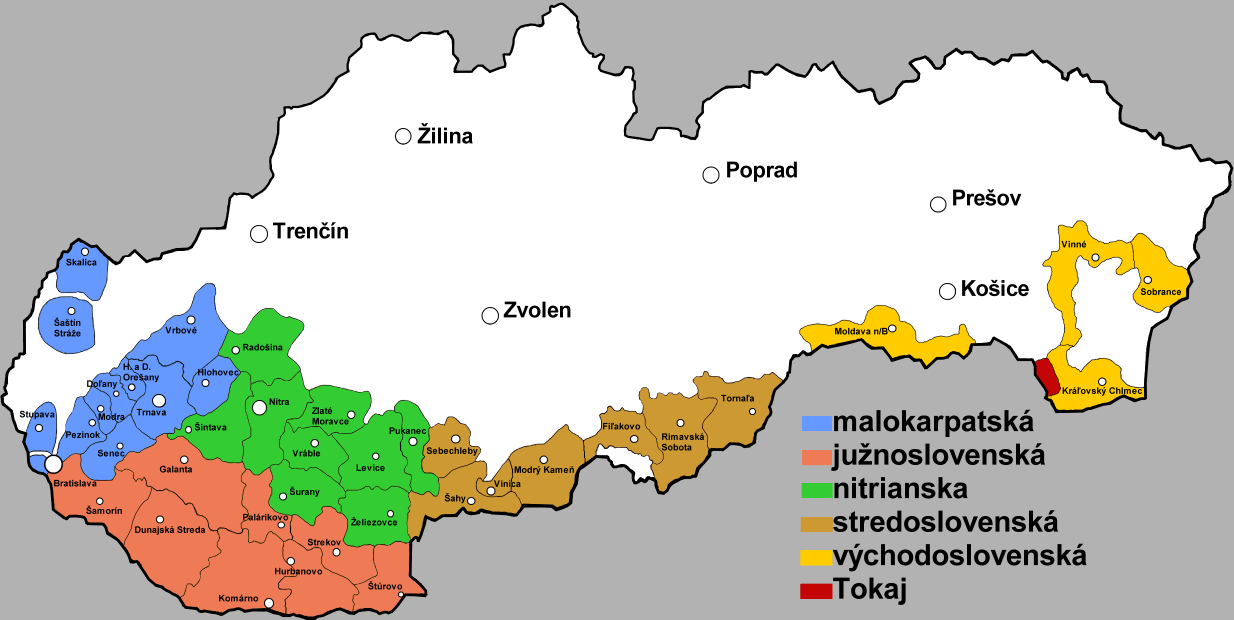
Wine-producing regions in Slovakia

- Malokarpatská (Small Carpathians)
- Južnoslovenská (Southern Slovakia)
- Nitrianska (region of Nitra)
- Stredoslovenská (Central Slovakia)
- Tokaj (Tokaj region of Slovakia)
- Východoslovenská (Eastern Slovakia)
- The whole of southern Slovakia

=== Slovenia ===
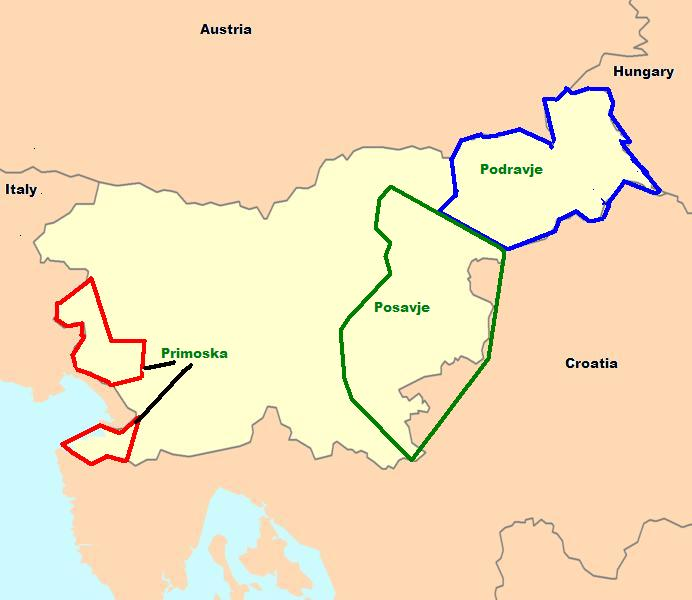
The three wine regions in Slovenia

- Podravje
- Posavje
- Primorska

=== Spain ===
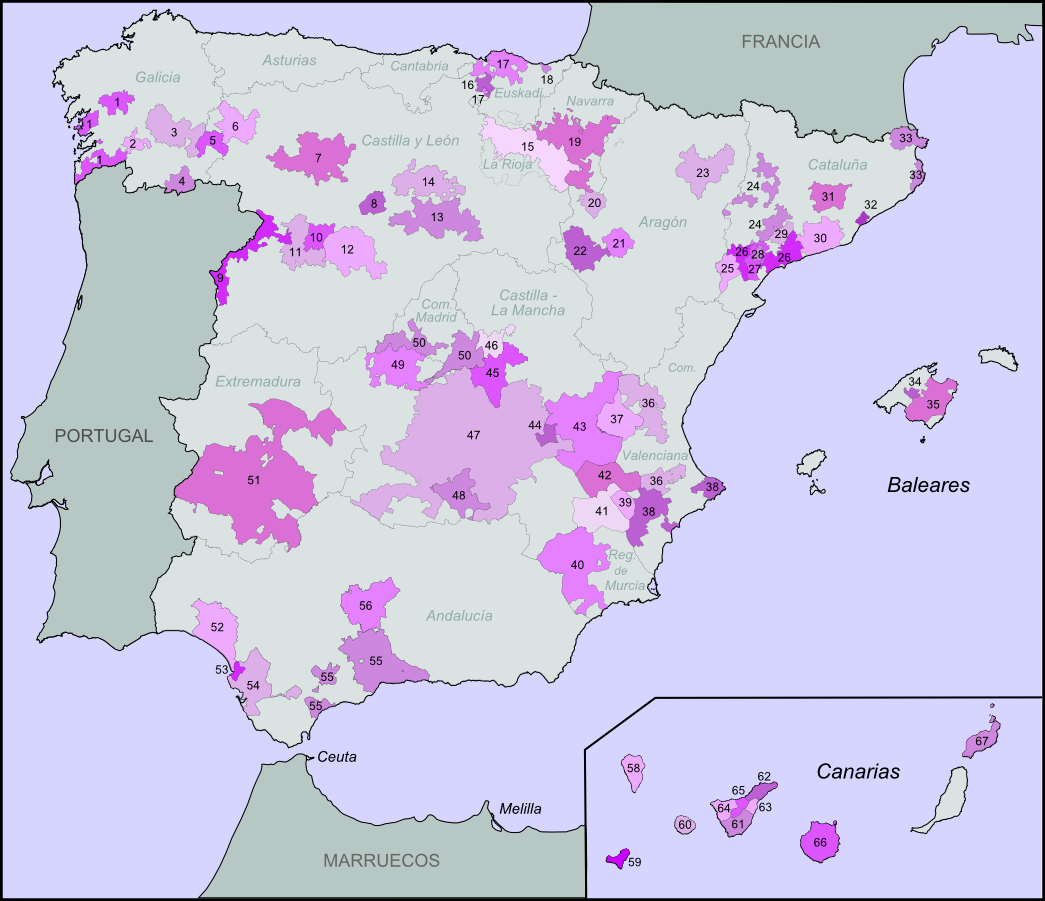
Spanish wine-producing regions

- Andalusia
  - Condado de Huelva
  - Jerez-Xeres-Sherry
  - Málaga and Sierras de Málaga
  - Manzanilla de Sanlúcar de Barrameda
  - Montilla-Moriles
- Aragon
  - Calatayud
  - Campo de Borja
  - Campo de Cariñena
  - Cava
  - Somontano
- Balearic Islands
  - Binissalem-Mallorca
  - Plà i Llevant (DO)
- Basque Country
  - Alavan Txakoli
  - Biscayan Txakoli
  - Cava
  - Getaria Txakoli
  - Rioja (Alavesa)
- Canary Islands
  - Abona
  - El Hierro (DO)
  - Gran Canaria (DO)
  - La Gomera (DO)
  - La Palma (DO)
  - Lanzarote (DO)
  - Tacoronte-Acentejo
  - Valle de Güímar
  - Valle de la Orotava
  - Ycoden-Daute-Isora
- Castile and León
  - Arlanza
  - Arribes del Duero
  - Bierzo
  - Cava
  - Cigales
  - Espumosos de Castilla y León
  - Ribera del Duero
  - Rueda
  - Tierra del Vino de Zamora
  - Toro
  - Valles de Benavente
  - Tierra de León
  - Valtiendas
  - Vino de la Tierra Castilla y León
- Castile–La Mancha
  - Almansa
  - Dominio de Valdepusa
  - Guijoso
  - Jumilla
  - La Mancha
  - Manchuela
  - Méntrida
  - Mondéjar
  - Ribera del Júcar
  - Valdepeñas
- Catalonia
  - Alella
  - Catalunya
  - Cava
  - Conca de Barberà
  - Costers del Segre
  - Empordà
  - Montsant
  - Penedès
  - Pla de Bages
  - Priorat
  - Tarragona
  - Terra Alta
- Extremadura
  - Cava
  - Ribera del Guadiana
- Galicia
  - Monterrei
  - Rías Baixas
  - Ribeira Sacra
  - Ribeiro
  - Valdeorras
- La Rioja
  - Cava
  - Rioja (DOCa)
- Community of Madrid
  - Vinos de Madrid
- Región de Murcia
  - Bullas
  - Jumilla
  - Yecla
- Navarre
  - Cava
  - Navarra
  - Rioja
- Valencian Community
  - Alicante
  - Cava
  - Utiel-Requena
  - Valencia

=== Sweden ===
- Gutevin – Gotland

=== Switzerland ===
- Aargau
- Bern
  - Shores of Lake Biel
  - Shores of Lake Thun (Spiez / Oberhofen)
- Freiburg
- Geneva
- Grisons
- Neuchâtel
- St. Gallen
- Schaffhausen
- Thurgau
- Ticino
- Valais
- Vaud
  - La Côte
  - Lavaux
- Zürich

=== Turkey ===
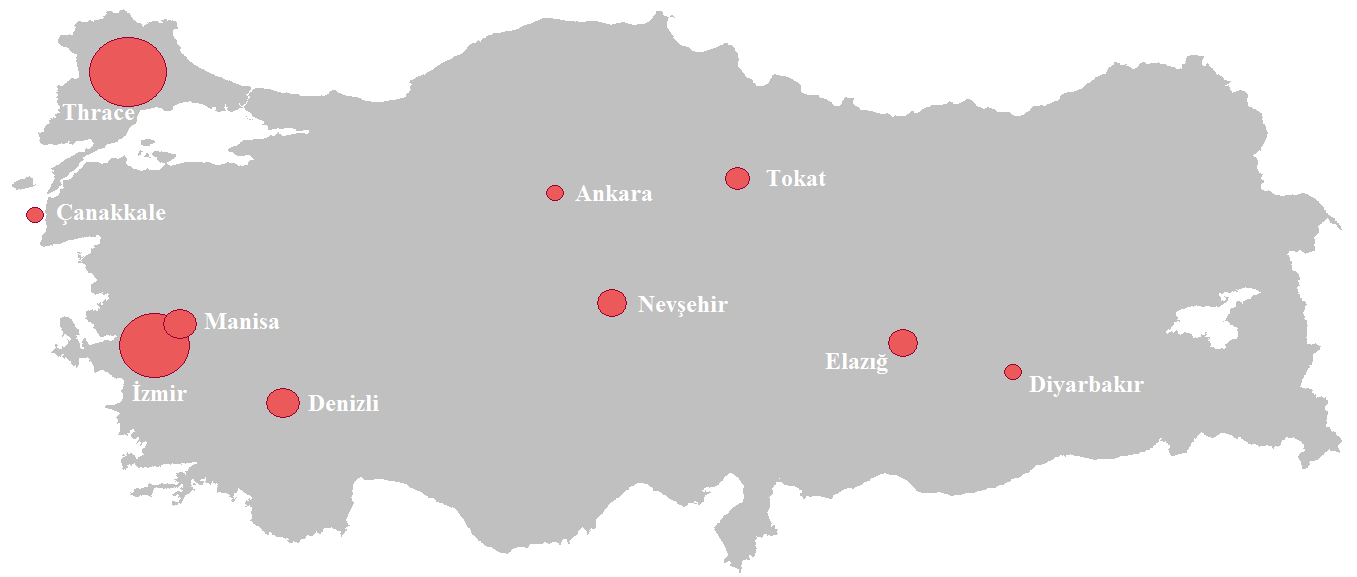
Wine-producing regions in Turkey

- White wine grapes:
  - Altıntaş – Marmara region and Bozcaada
  - Beylerce – Bilecik area
  - Bornova Misketi – İzmir area
  - Emir – Nevşehir (Cappadocia) area
  - Hasandede – Ankara and central Anatolia
  - Narince – Tokat area
  - Rumi, Kabarcık, Dökülgen – Southeastern Anatolia region
  - Sultaniye – Aegean region
  - Yapıncak – Thracian region
- Red wine grapes
  - Adakarası – Marmara region and Avşa Island
  - Boğazkere – Elazığ and Diyarbakır areas
  - Çalkarası – Çal, Denizli area
  - Dimrit – central Anatolia and eastern Aegean region
  - Horozkarası, Sergikarası – southeastern Anatolia region
  - Kalecik Karası – Ankara area
  - Karalahna – Tekirdağ region, Bozcaada
  - Karasakız, Kuntra – Çanakkale region
  - Öküzgözü – Elazığ area
  - Papazkarası – Kırklareli area

=== Ukraine ===
In Ukraine, at the present time there are seven administrative regions (provinces) in which the wine industry has developed. Given the favorable climatic location, the law of Ukraine allocated 15 winegrowing areas (macrozones), which are the basis for growing certain varieties of grapes, and 58 natural wine regions (microzones). These are located mainly in the following areas.

- Autonomous Republic of Crimea and Sevastopol – 6 macrozones with 12 microzones (69 wine grapes)
- Kherson Oblast – 2 macrozones with 10 microzones (28 wine grapes)
- Mykolaiv Oblast – 2 macrozones with 7 microzones (31 wine grapes)
- Odesa Oblast – 3 macrozones with 16 microzones (42 wine grapes)
- Zakarpattia Oblast – 1 macrozone with 12 microzones (24 wine grapes)
- Zaporizhzhia Oblast – 1 macrozone with 1 microzone (5 wine grapes)

=== United Kingdom ===
In the UK, the area under vines is small, and whilst viticulture is not a major part of the rural economy, significant planting of new vines has occurred in the early 21st century. The greatest concentration of vineyards is found in the south east of England, in the counties of Hampshire, Kent, Surrey, and Sussex.

== Asia ==
=== Armenia ===
- Ararat Valley
- Areni, in the Vayots Dzor Province
- Armavir, in the Armavir Province
- Ijevan, in the Tavush Province
- Voskevaz, in the Aragatsotn Province
- Yerevan, the country’s capital

=== Azerbaijan ===
- Aghdam, Agdam District
- Baku, capital
- Ganja, Ganja-Basar zone in central Azerbaijan
- Madrasa village of Shamakhi Rayon, from Madrasa, indigenous only to this region
- Tovuz and Shamkir, northwestern Azerbaijan

=== Burma ===
- Shan State

=== China ===
Regions producing native wines have been present since the Qin dynasty, with wines being brought to China from Persia. Some of the more famous wine-producing regions are:

- Chang'an
- Gaochang
- Luoyang
- Qiuci
- Yantai-Penglai

With the import of Western wine-making technologies, especially French technology, production of wines similar to modern French wine has begun in many parts of China with the direction of experienced French wine-makers; China is now the sixth largest producer of wine in the world. The following regions produce significant quality of wine:

- Chang'an
- Dalian, Liaoning
- Tonghua, Jilin
- Yantai, Shandong
- Yibin, Sichuan
- Zhangjiakou, Hebei

=== India ===
- Nashik, Maharashtra
- Bangalore, Karnataka
- Vijayapura, Karnataka
- Narayangaon
- Pune, Maharashtra
- Sangli, Maharashtra

=== Indonesia ===
Indonesia has been producing wine for over 18 years, with North Bali's vineyards producing three main grape varieties: the Belgia, the Alphonse Lavallee and the Probolinggo Biru. The main producer, Hatten Wines, has revolutionized the world of winemaking, with eight wines produced from these three varieties.

- Bali

=== Iran ===
Prior to the Iranian Islamic Revolution of 1979, Iran was a producer of wine. While production has stopped, the vineyards continue to exist and their product has been diverted to non-alcoholic purposes.

- Malayer
- Shiraz
- Takestan
- Urmia
- Qazvin
- Quchan

=== Israel ===
Also includes wine regions in Israeli-occupied territories.

- Galilee
  - Upper Galilee
- Golan Heights
- Judean Hills
  - Jerusalem
  - Bet Shemesh
  - Latrun
- Mount Carmel
- Rishon LeZion (wine production since 1886)
- Negev The only Desert in the world which produces wine

=== Japan ===
- Yamanashi
- Hokkaido
- Nagano

=== South Korea ===
- Anseong, Gyeonggi-do
- Gimcheon, Gyeongsangbuk-do
- Gyeongsan, Gyeongsangbuk-do
- Yeongcheon, Gyeongsangbuk-do
- Yeongdong, Chungcheongbuk-do

=== Lebanon ===
- Bekaa Valley
  - Anjar
  - Chtoura
  - Rashaya
  - Zahlé
- Mount Lebanon
  - Aley
  - Baabda
  - Beit Mery
  - Bhamdoun
  - Brummana
  - Byblos
  - Chouf
  - Keserwan District
- North Governorate
  - Batroun District
  - Chekka
  - Ehden
  - Koura
  - Qadisha Valley
  - Tripoli
  - Zgharta
- South Governorate
  - Jezzine
  - Marjayoun
  - Rmaich

=== Palestinian territories ===
- Beit Jala
- Hebron

=== Syria ===
- Bloudan
- Homs District
- Jabal el Druze
- Latakia
- Sednaya
- Syrian Golan
- Tartous

=== Turkey ===
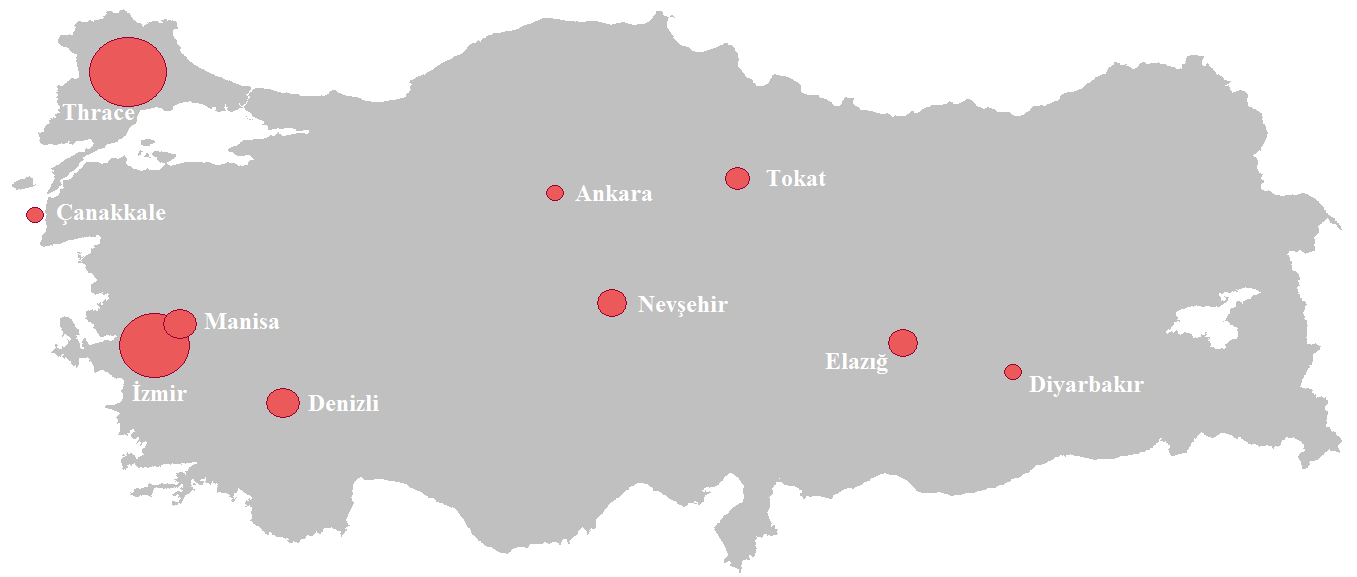
Wine-producing regions in Turkey

- White wine grapes:
  - Altıntaş – Marmara region and Bozcaada
  - Beylerce – Bilecik area
  - Bornova Misketi – İzmir area
  - Emir – Nevşehir (Cappadocia) area
  - Hasandede – Ankara and central Anatolia
  - Narince – Tokat area
  - Rumi, Kabarcık, Dökülgen – Southeastern Anatolia region
  - Sultaniye – Aegean region
  - Yapıncak – Thracian region
- Red wine grapes
  - Adakarası – Marmara region and Avşa Island
  - Boğazkere – Elazığ and Diyarbakır areas
  - Çalkarası – Çal, Denizli area
  - Dimrit – central Anatolia and eastern Aegean region
  - Horozkarası, Sergikarası – southeastern Anatolia region
  - Kalecik Karası – Ankara area
  - Karalahna – Tekirdağ region, Bozcaada
  - Karasakız, Kuntra – Çanakkale region
  - Öküzgözü – Elazığ area
  - Papazkarası – Kırklareli area

=== Vietnam ===
- Da Lat

== Oceania ==
=== Australia ===
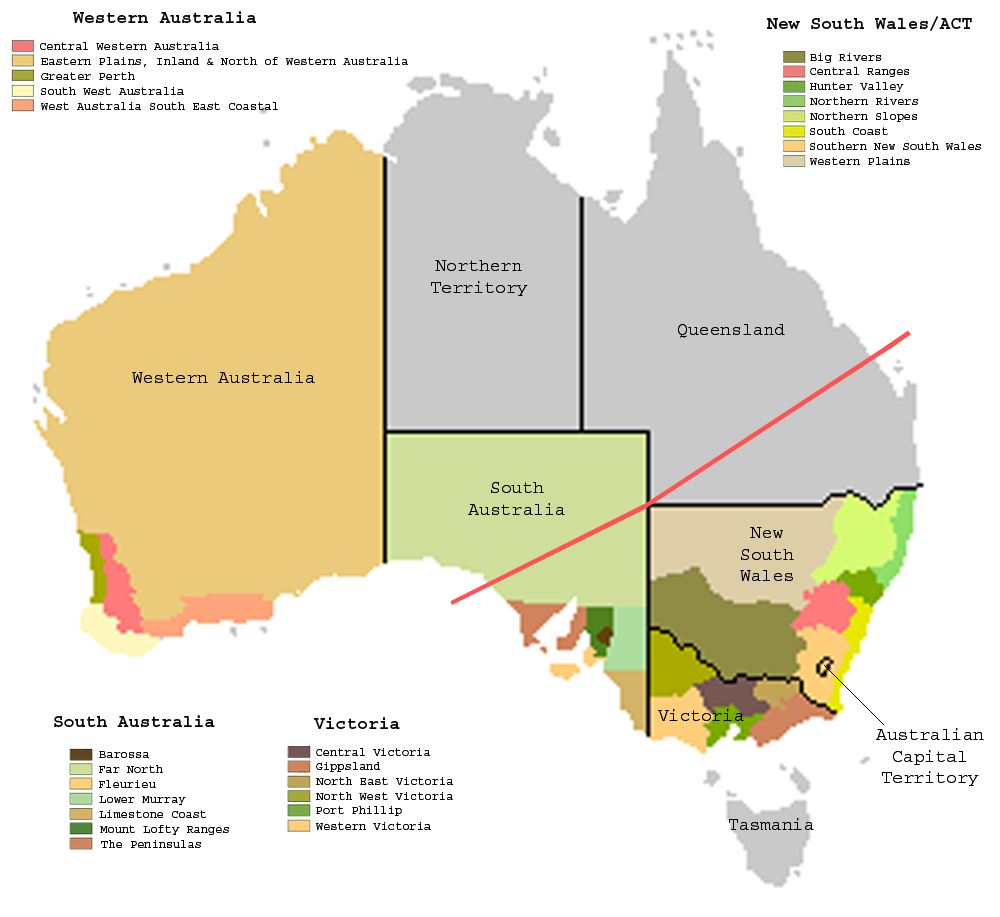
Australian geographic indications by state

Geographic indications for Australian wine are governed by law. The geographic indication must indicate where the grapes are grown, irrespective of where the wine itself is made. A geographic indication may be "Australia", "South Eastern Australia", a state name, zone, region or subregion if defined.

The zones, regions and subregions in each state are listed below:

==== Australian Capital Territory ====
- Canberra District wine region
- Hall, Australian Capital Territory
- Majura

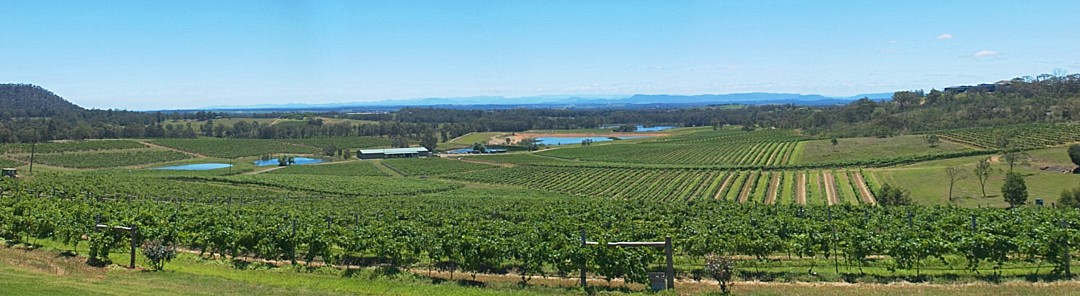
Vineyard in Hunter Valley, Australia

==== New South Wales ====
- Big Rivers
  - Murray Darling
  - Perricoota
  - Riverina
  - Swan Hill
- Central Ranges
  - Cowra
  - Mudgee
  - Orange
- Hunter Valley
  - Hunter
    - Broke Fordwich
    - Pokolbin
    - Upper Hunter Valley
- Northern Rivers
  - Hastings River
- Northern Tablelands
  - New England
- South Coast
  - Shoalhaven Coast
  - Southern Highlands
- Southern New South Wales
  - Canberra District (includes the northern part of the Australian Capital Territory)
  - Gundagai
  - Hilltops
  - Tumbarumba

==== Queensland ====
- Granite Belt
- South Burnett

==== South Australia ====
Adelaide Super Zone includes Mount Lofty Ranges, Fleurieu and Barossa wine zones.

- Barossa
  - Barossa Valley
  - Eden Valley
    - High Eden
- Far North
  - Southern Flinders Ranges
- Fleurieu
  - Currency Creek
  - Kangaroo Island
  - Langhorne Creek
  - McLaren Vale
  - Southern Fleurieu
- Limestone Coast
  - Coonawarra
  - Mount Benson
  - Mount Gambier
  - Padthaway
  - Robe
  - Wrattonbully
- Lower Murray
  - Riverland
- Mount Lofty Ranges
  - Adelaide Hills
    - Lenswood
    - Piccadilly Valley
  - Adelaide Plains
  - Clare Valley
- The Peninsulas

==== Tasmania ====
Regions, no zones defined

- Coal River
- Derwent Valley
- East Coast
- North West
- Pipers River
- Southern
- Tamar Valley

==== Victoria ====
- Central Victoria
  - Bendigo
  - Goulburn Valley
    - Nagambie Lakes
  - Heathcote
  - Strathbogie Ranges
  - Upper Goulburn
- Gippsland
- North East Victoria
  - Alpine Valleys
  - Beechworth
  - Glenrowan
  - King Valley
  - Rutherglen
- North West Victoria
  - Murray Darling
  - Swan Hill
- Port Phillip
  - Geelong
  - Macedon Ranges
  - Mornington Peninsula
  - Sunbury
  - Yarra Valley
- Western Victoria
  - Grampians
  - Henty
  - Pyrenees

==== Western Australia ====
- Greater Perth
  - Peel
  - Perth Hills
  - Swan Valley
- South Western Australia
  - Blackwood Valley
  - Geographe
  - Great Southern
    - Albany
    - Denmark
    - Frankland River
    - Mount Barker
    - Porongurup
  - Manjimup
  - Margaret River
  - Pemberton

=== New Zealand ===
Wine region map of New Zealand

GI stands for New Zealand Geographical Indication.

- Auckland (GI)
  - Henderson
  - Kumeu (GI)
  - Matakana (GI)
  - Waiheke Island (GI)
- Canterbury (GI)
  - North Canterbury (GI)
  - Waipara Valley (GI)
- Central Otago (GI)
  - Bendigo
  - Bannockburn (GI)
  - Gibbston
  - Wānaka
- Gisborne (GI)
- Hawke's Bay (GI)
  - Central Hawke's Bay (GI)
  - Gimblett Gravels
  - Bridge Pa Triangle
- Marlborough (GI)
  - Wairau Valley
  - Southern Valleys
  - Awatere Valley
- Nelson (GI)
- Northland (GI)
- Waikato (Te Kauwhata)
- Wairarapa (GI)
  - Martinborough (GI)
  - Gladstone (GI)
- Waitaki Valley (GI)
