= Ribera del Júcar =

Coordinates: 39°22′N 2°12′W

Ribera del Júcar DOP
- Wine region
- Ribera del Júcar DOP in the province of Cuenca in the region of Castile-La Mancha
- Official name: D.O.P. Ribera del Júcar
- Type: Denominación de Origen Protegida (DOP)
- Year established: 2003
- Country: Spain
- Size of planted vineyards: 9,000 hectares (22,239 acres)
- No. of wineries: 9
- Wine produced: 5,426 hectolitres
- Comments: Data for 2016 / 2017

Ribera del Júcar is a Spanish Denominación de Origen Protegida (DOP) for wines located in the province of Cuenca (Castile-La Mancha, Spain) along the banks of the River Júcar and covers 7 municipalities.

== History ==
Grapes have been grown and wine produced in this area for centuries but DOP status was acquired only in 2003, making Ribera de Júcar one of the youngest DOPs in Spain.

== Climate ==
The climate is Mediterranean continental with sharp contrasts between summer and winter temperatures. The average temperature is 24°C in summer and 5°C in winter. Rainfall is sparse, around 350 mm/year.

== Soil ==
The area covered by the DOP is located on a plateau of pebbly soil at an altitude of 750 m above sea level along the banks of the River Júcar. The drainage is good in that rainwater can penetrate through the top pebbly layer down to the clay subsoil where it is retained.

== Grape varieties ==
The authorised varieties are:

- Red: Cencibel / Tempranillo, Cabernet Sauvignon, Merlot, Syrah, Bobal, Petit Verdot, and Cabernet Franc
- White: Moscatel de Grano Menudo, and Sauvignon Blanc

The maximum authorised production is 9,000 kg/ha for low bush vines and 10,000 kg/ha for vines on trellises. Around 40% of the vines are over 20 years old.
