= Bijela Loza =

Bijela Loza may refer to:

- Bijela Loza, a name for the wine grape Krstač
- Bijela Loza, Croatia, a village near Podgorač, Croatia
