= Montenegrin wine =

Wine making in Montenegro

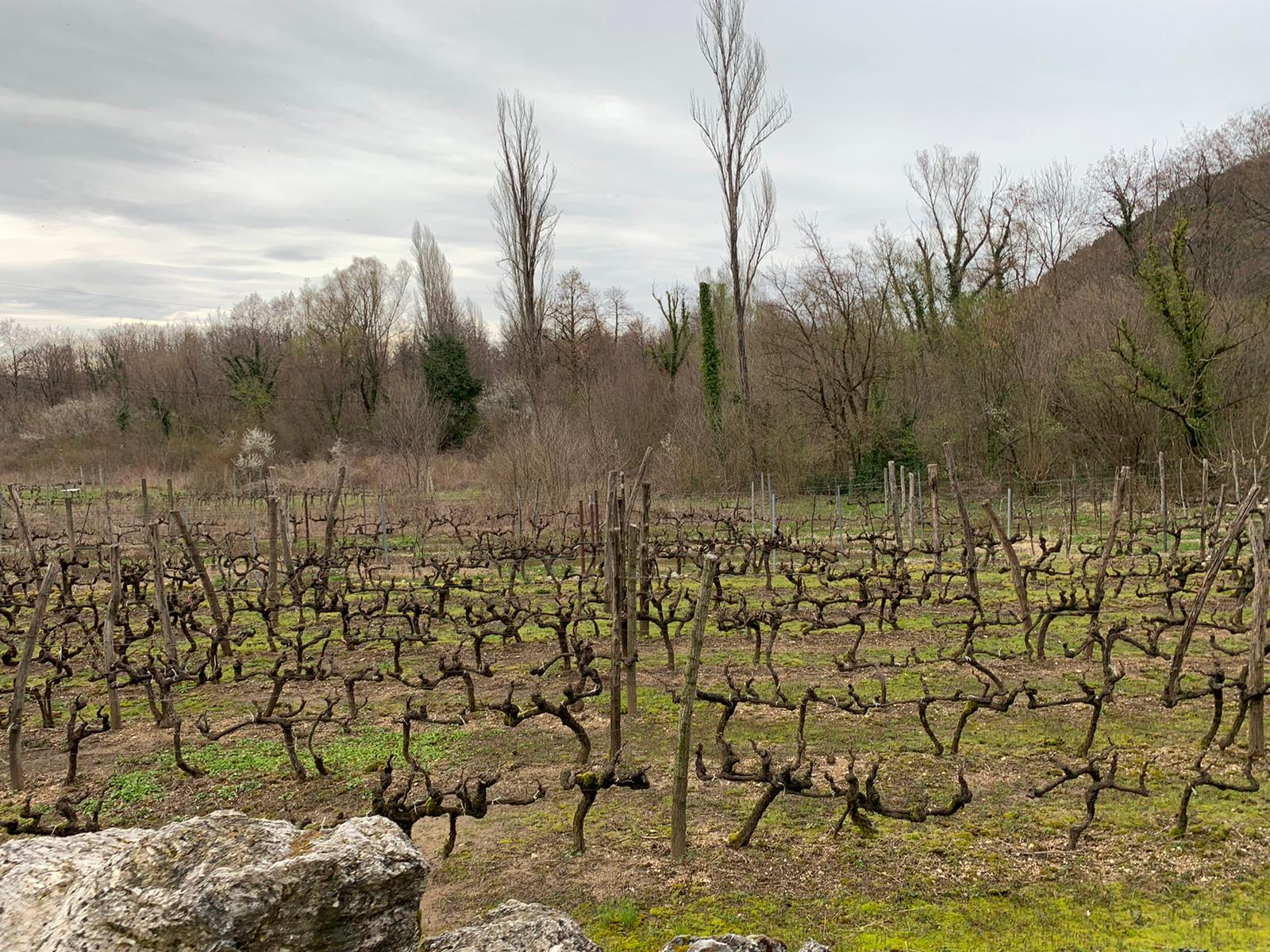
Vineyard by Lake Skadar

Montenegrin wine is wine made in the Balkan country of Montenegro. Many Montenegrin vineyards are located in the southern and coastal regions of the country. Montenegrin wines are made from a wide range of grape varieties including Krstač, Cabernet Sauvignon, Chardonnay and Vranac. Other indigenous cultivars include Bioka, Čubrica, Krstač, and Žižak.

== History ==
Viticulture in Montenegro dates back to the Illyrians; relics of wine-making and wine-trading have been found in the necropolis of the coastal city Budva dating back to the 4th century BCE. Tombstones found in Montenegro were decorated with grapevines and wine motifs related to the Dionysian cult. Montenegro is considered the origin of the Kratošija (better known as Zinfandel) and Vranac grape varieties. The earliest reference to the Montenegrin variety Kratošija comes from the medieval statute of Budva, written in Italian, and dated 1426-1442 CE. Grape-growing and wine-producing regulations were introduced under the reign of Nicholas I of Montenegro.

== Production ==
In Montenegro, the Vranac and Kratošija varieties are primarily used for making red wines, whereas Krstač is the dominant variety for white wine. Kratošija was the predominant variety until the phylloxera epidemic. The most prevalent variety, Vranac, represents more than 70% of domestic wine production.

The amount of land in vineyard cultivation has increased significantly throughout the Balkans since 2000, including in Montenegro. Grapes are grown on over 2,800 hectares (28 km^{2}) with a gross production of 22,200 tons in 2017. Per European Union regulations, the Montenegrin wine-producing area is divided into four wine regions and fifteen sub-regions, the most important of which is around Lake Skadar. The other principal region is along the coastal area on the Adriatic Sea.

== Trade ==
Counterfeit Montenegrin wine brands have circulated in Eastern Europe and the western Balkans; a group of researchers from Serbia, Finland, Montenegro, and the Netherlands have described a system using smart labels to identify genuine bottles and screen out imposters.

Shortly before the Montenegrin parliament ratified the NATO accession treaty, Russia banned imports of Montenegrin wine from the state-owned wine producer Plantaže under claims of elevated levels of metalaxyl, pesticides, and particle plastics. Previously, one-fifth of the country's wine exports went to Russia.

== See also ==
- Winemaking
- Agriculture in Montenegro
