= Méntrida =

Méntrida may refer to:

- Méntrida (wine), a wine produced in the northeast corner of the province of Toledo, Spain
- Méntrida, Toledo, a municipality in the province of Toledo, Spain
