= Méntrida DO =

Coordinates: 40°03′N 4°12′W

Méntrida DOP
- Wine region
- Méntrida DO in the province of Toledo in the region of Castile-La Mancha
- Official name: D.O.P. Méntrida
- Type: Denominación de Origen Protegida (DOP)
- Year established: 1976
- Country: Spain
- Sub-regions: Talavera, Torrijos and Sagra-Toledo
- Size of planted vineyards: 5,800 hectares (14,332 acres)
- No. of wineries: 26
- Wine produced: 31,071 hectolitres
- Comments: Data for 2016 / 2017

Méntrida is a Spanish Denominación de Origen Protegida (DOP) for wines covering many municipalities in the northeast corner of the province of Toledo (Castile-La Mancha, Spain) and which is divided into three distinct areas: Talavera, Torrijos and Sagra-Toledo, with over 26,000 hectares (64,000 acres) under vines, the majority (71%) being in Torrijos.

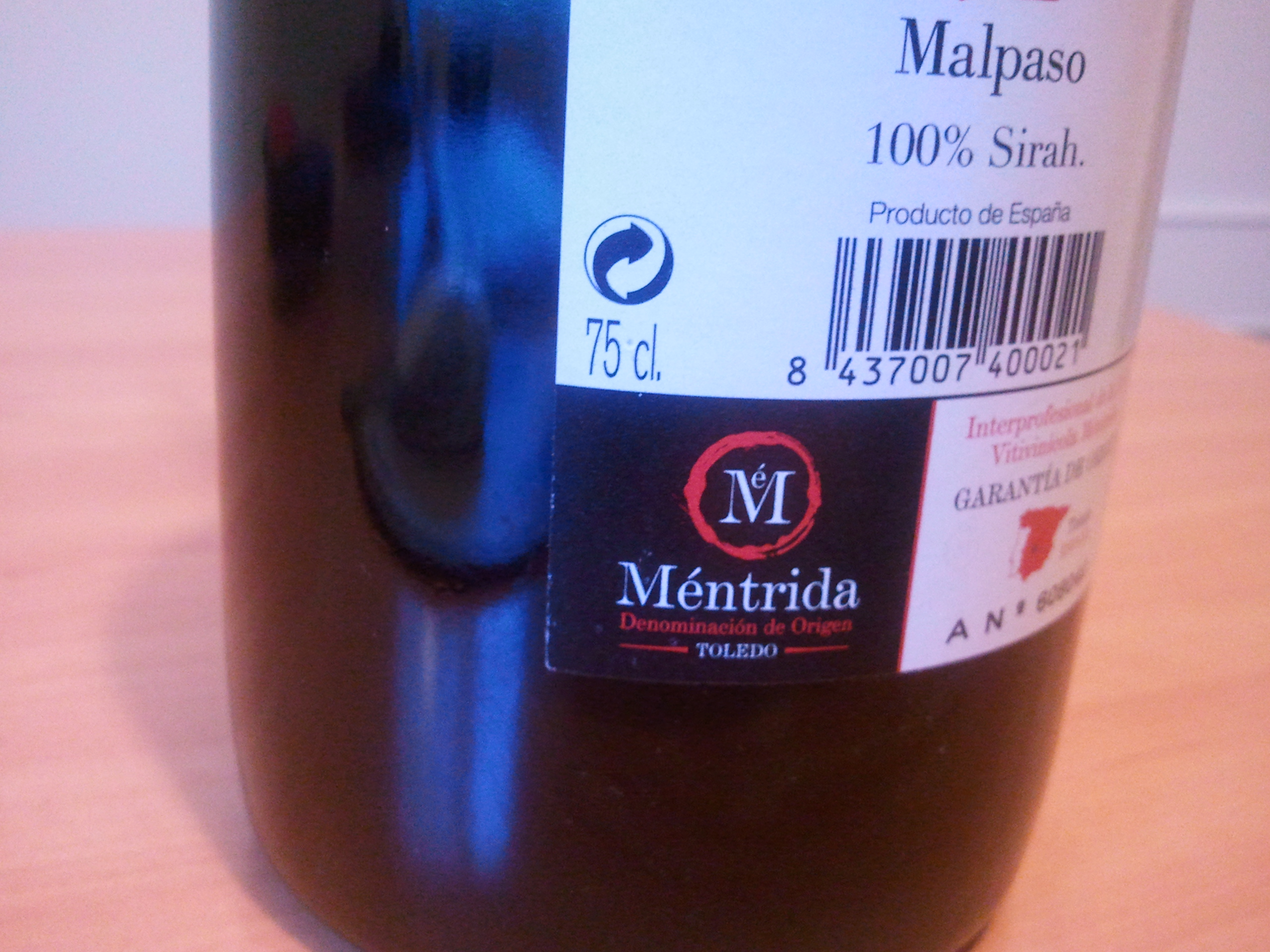
Méntrida DO

== History ==
Wine has been produced in this region since at least the 16th century. For many centuries its main market was the city of Madrid though at the end of the 19th century wines were exported abroad and participated in international trade fairs.

== Climate ==
The climate is continental (long hot summers and cold winters) with extreme temperature variations over the course of the year: around 40 °C (104 °F) in summer and below zero in winter, with many days of frost. The average annual rainfall is between 300–450 millimetres (12–18 in), falling mainly between March and May and between September and November.

== Soils ==
The soils are sandy-clay with an average loose consistency. They are poor in nutrients and retain the available moisture well. The vineyards are mainly at a height of between 400 and 600 metres (1,300 and 2,000 ft) above sea level, though some municipalities in the northeast reach a height of 800 m.

== Grapes ==
Méntrida produces mainly red wines as the red grape variety Garnacha represents over 80% of the grapes planted.

The authorised varieties are:

- Red: Cabernet Franc, Cencibel, Cabernet Sauvignon, Garnacha, Graciano, Merlot, Petit Verdot, and Syrah
- White: Albillo, Moscatel de Grano Menudo, Chardonnay, Sauvignon Blanc, Verdejo, and Viura / Macabeo

The vines are planted mainly as low bushes (en vaso) although new vineyards with irrigation tend to be planted on trellises. The planting density varies between 1,100 and 2,500 vines/ha.
