= Sunbury wine region =

Sunbury
- Wine region
- Official name: Sunbury
- Type: Australian Geographical Indication
- Year established: 1998
- Country: Australia
- Part of: Port Phillip zone
- Size of planted vineyards: 101 hectares (250 acres)
- Varietals produced: Shiraz; Cabernet Franc; Chardonnay

The Sunbury wine region is an Australian Geographical Indication for wine made from grapes grown in a region surrounding the town of Sunbury northwest of Melbourne in the Australian state of Victoria. It is one of five regions in the Port Philip zone surrounding Melbourne. The wine region covers suburbs and inner rural areas in the northwestern sector of the Melbourne urban area, extending as far west as Bacchus Marsh and northeast to Beveridge on the Hume Highway.

The oldest vines date back to the 1850s. They were planted by James Goodall Francis in 1858 at Goona Warra and James Johnston at Craiglee in 1864. Top grape varieties grown in the Sunbury region include Shiraz, Cabernet Franc and Chardonnay.
