= Valles de Benavente =

Valles de Benavente VdC
- Wine region
- Type: Vino de Calidad
- Country: Spain

Valles de Benavente is a Spanish geographical indication for wines referred to legally as Vino de Calidad con Indicación Geográfica. This is one step below the mainstream Denominación de Origen quality wines and one step above the less stringent Vino de la Tierra table wines on the quality ladder.

It is located in the north of the province of Zamora, Castile and León region, Spain.

== History ==
Grape cultivation was probably introduced by the ancient Romans.

== Climate ==
The climate in this area is continental (long, hot dry summers and cold winters). Rainfall between 350 mm/yr and 500 mm/yr.

== Grape Varieties ==
Recommended

- Red varieties: Tempranillo, Prieto Picudo and Mencía
- White varieties: Verdejo and Malvasía

Authorized:

- Red varieties: Garnacha and Cabernet Sauvignon

The maximum allowable yields are as follows:

- Red varieties: 7000 kg/ha
- White varieties: 9000 kg/ha
