= Canterbury wine region =

Wine region in New Zealand

Canterbury
- Wine region
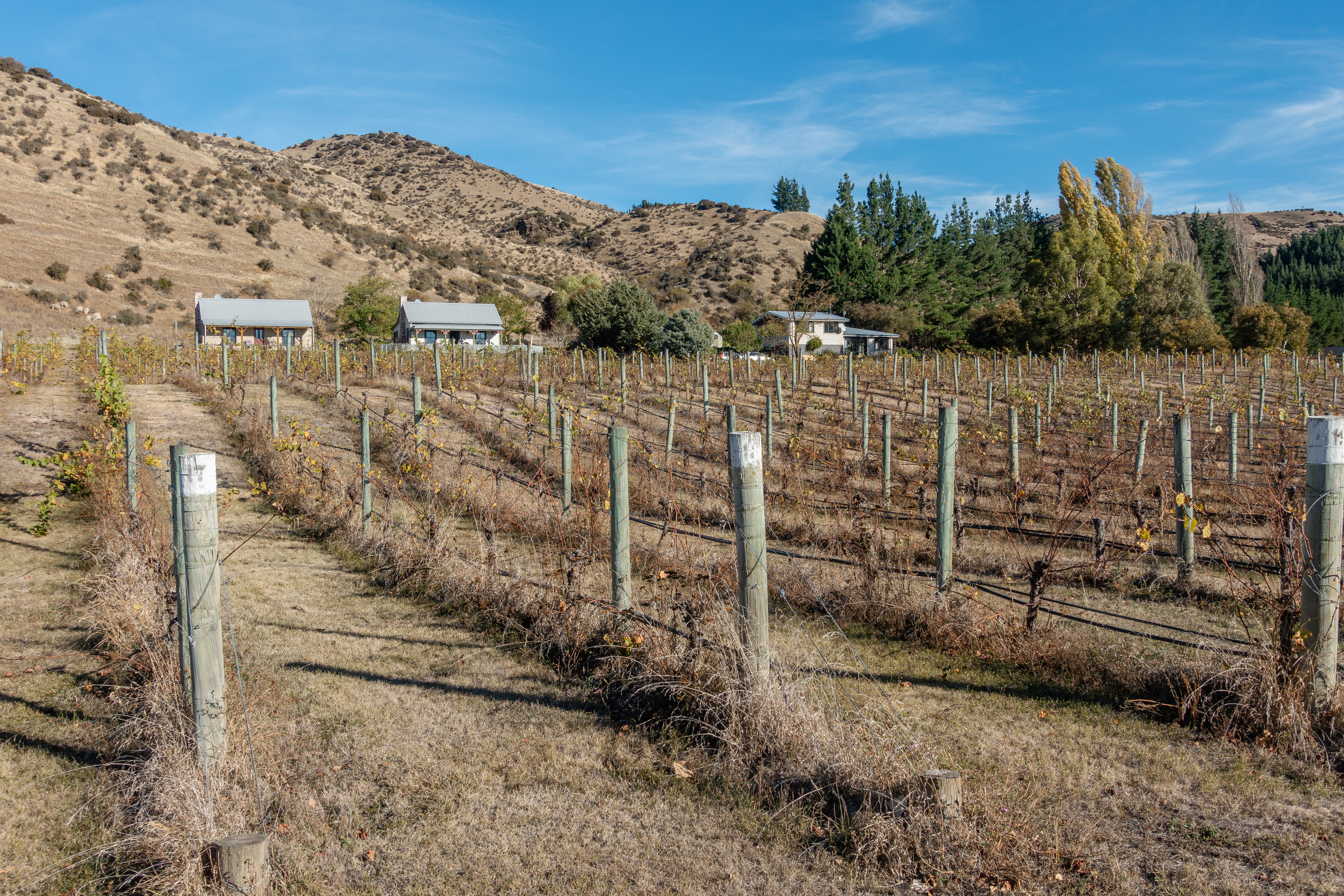
- Vineyard in winter by Hurunui Hotel, Canterbury
- Type: Geographical Indication
- Year established: 1970s; GI established 2018
- Country: New Zealand
- Sub-regions: North Canterbury; Waipara Valley
- Size of planted vineyards: 1,497 hectares (3,700 acres)
- No. of vineyards: 108
- Grapes produced: Pinot Noir; Sauvignon Blanc; Riesling; Pinot Gris; Chardonnay; Gewürztraminer
- No. of wineries: 71
- Comments: Data from 2022.

The Canterbury wine region is a New Zealand wine region and geographical indication that covers wine made anywhere within the Canterbury Region excluding the Kaikōura District, an area of some 44,500 square kilometres (17,200 sq mi) in the South Island.

== Regions ==
Grape varieties planted in Canterbury in 2022 by vineyard area, total 1,497 hectares (3,700 acres).
1. Pinot Noir (29.7%)
2. Sauvignon Blanc (26.8%)
3. Riesling (18.1%)
4. Pinot Gris (14.3%)
5. Chardonnay (6.6%)
6. Gewürztraminer (1.2%)
7. Other (3.3%)
Data from New Zealand Winegrowers vineyard report.

Almost all the region's vineyards are concentrated in a relatively small area north of the city of Christchurch, which has prompted the establishment of two smaller sub-region geographical indications within it. The North Canterbury GI is simply the top half of the larger Canterbury GI north of the Rakaia River, and within that lies the Waipara Valley GI, a small area about 60 kilometres (37 mi) north of Christchurch which accounts for the majority of Canterbury's total vineyard plantings.

=== Waipara Valley ===
Waipara Valley is a small geographical indication about 60 kilometres (37 mi) north of Christchurch, and was established as the first sub-region of the larger Canterbury GI. The valley floor provides a warm micro-climate ideal for viticulture. To the west, the Southern Alps temper the prevailing westerly winds and provide a rain shadow, and to the east, low coastal limestone ridges moderate the cool ocean winds. In the 1970s, the first vineyard to be planted was Pegasus Bay, which established a reputation for its Riesling wine. The region makes up the bulk of Canterbury's plantings, which by 2017 was a total vineyard area of 1,257 hectares (3,110 acres), well known for its Pinot Noir, of which 340 hectares (840 acres) is planted. Liam Steevenson MW has described Waipara as possibly the "most exciting place to grow Pinot Noir". Good examples of the region's Pinot Noir include those from Black Estate, Bellbird Spring, Fancrest Estate, Muddy Water, Greystone, Waipara Springs, Pegasus Bay and Crater Rim. Greystone Wines won the Decanter International Trophy for Pinot Noir in 2014 and the Air New Zealand Trophy for Pinot Noir. Black Estate was awarded the Trophy for Best Pinot Noir at the International Wine & Spirits Competition in 2010. White wines of the region include varietal wines, most commonly of Sauvignon Blanc, Riesling, Pinot Gris, and Chardonnay.

=== North Canterbury ===
In 2018, the Wines of Canterbury and Waipara Valley Wine Growers associations merged to form the North Canterbury Wine Region, which was separately registered as a second Canterbury sub-region GI, in June 2020. The Waipara GI is within the area of the North Canterbury GI boundary, and the merged industry body promotes the use of "North Canterbury" for its region, although both "North Canterbury" and "Waipara" still appear on wine labels.

Only 168 hectares (420 acres) of vineyards are planted outside the Waipara Valley GI boundary, concentrated in a few small areas such as West Melton, Banks Peninsula, Cheviot, and Rolleston. These satellite producers include French Peak (formerly French Farm), Melton Estate, and Lone Goat, which took over Riesling vineyards from Giesen Estate and own New Zealand's only Ehrenfelser vineyard. In order of descending planting area, varieties grown in Canterbury outside Waipara Valley include Pinot Noir, Sauvignon Blanc, Riesling, Pinot Gris, and Chardonnay.

Further inland from Waipara, the limestone soils around Waikari are producing well-reviewed wine from Bell Hill and Pyramid Valley, using organic and/or biodynamic production methods, and close-planted vineyards. Wine is also being grown and made further north in Cheviot by Mt Beautiful.
