= Bosnia and Herzegovina wine =

Wine making in Bosnia and Herzegovina

Bosnia and Herzegovina wine is wine made in the Balkan country of Bosnia and Herzegovina.

Bosnia and Herzegovina vineyards are located in the southern regions of the country, with production focused in the area south of Mostar around the towns of Čitluk, Međugorje, Ljubuški, and Čapljina. Several wineries are also located in the northern region of Bosnia, with the most notable being the prizewinning Jungic Winery, situated to the east of Banja Luka. Bosnian wines are made from a wide range of grape varieties including Blatina, Žilavka, Trnjak and Vranac.

The Tvrdoš Monastery near the city of Trebinje is renowned for its wine production and its wine cellars, one of which dates to the 15th century, which are a popular tourist attraction.

== See also ==
- Winemaking
- Agriculture in Bosnia and Herzegovina
