= Sauvignon blanc =

Green-skinned grape variety

- Grape (Vitis)
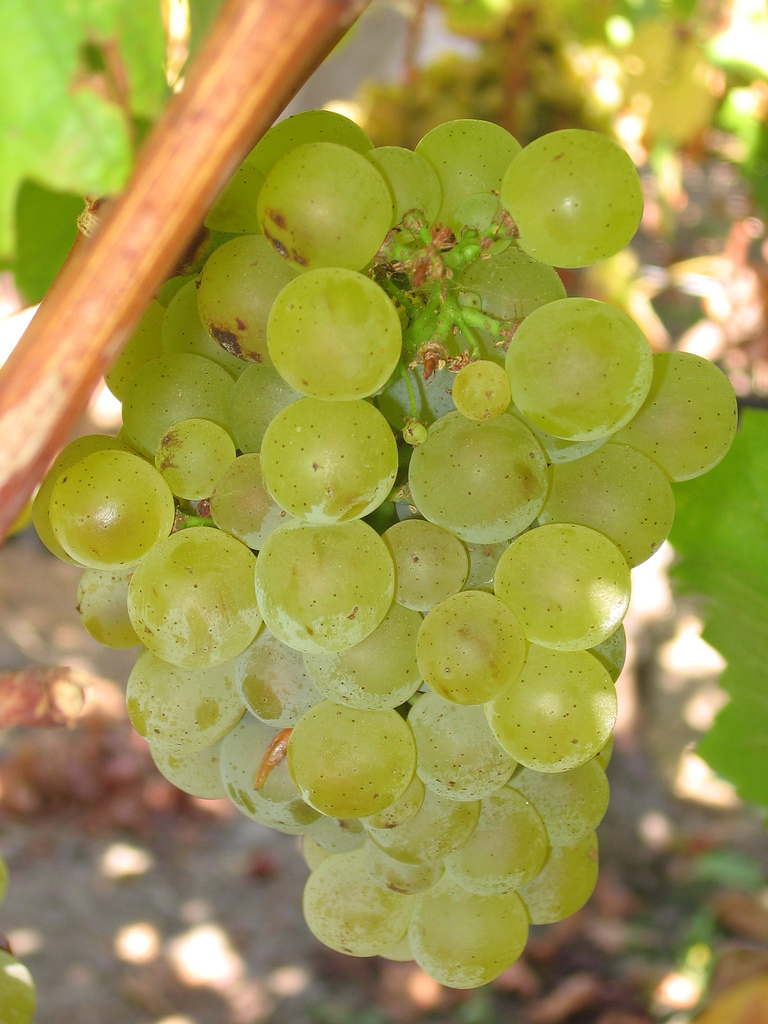
- Ripe Sauvignon blanc grapes
- Color of berry skin: Pink
- Species: Vitis vinifera
- Also called: Sauvignon jaune, Blanc Fume (France), Muskat-Silvaner (Germany and Austria), Fumé Blanc, Sav Blanc (Australia), Sauvignon Blanc (Argentina) and other synonyms
- Origin: France
- Notable regions: South Africa; Chile; New Zealand; California; Iran; Loire Valley; Bordeaux; Ukraine; Argentina
- Notable wines: Sauternes, Sancerre
- Hazards: Powdery mildew, black rot, and Botrytis cinerea
- VIVC number: 10790

Sauvignon blanc (French pronunciation: [soviɲɔ̃ blɑ̃]) is a green-skinned grape variety that most likely originated in the Loire Valley wine region in France, though it has also been historically cultivated in Bordeaux. The grape most likely gets its name from the French words sauvage ("wild") and blanc ("white") due to its early origins as an indigenous grape in South West France. It is possibly a descendant of Savagnin.

Sauvignon blanc is widely cultivated in many of the world's wine regions, including France, Argentina (also in Patagonia) Chile, Romania, Canada, Australia, New Zealand, South Africa, Bulgaria, and the states of Oregon, Washington, and California in the US. Some New World Sauvignon blancs, particularly from California, may also be called "Fumé Blanc", a marketing term coined by Robert Mondavi in reference to Pouilly-Fumé.

Sauvignon blanc produces a crisp, dry, and refreshing white varietal wine. Depending on the climate, the flavor can range from aggressively grassy to sweetly tropical. In cooler climates, the grape has a tendency to produce wines with noticeable acidity and "green flavors" of grass, green bell peppers and nettles with some tropical fruit (such as passion fruit) and floral (such as elderflower) notes. In warmer climates, it can develop more tropical fruit notes but risks losing much aroma from over-ripeness, leaving only slight grapefruit and tree fruit (such as peach) notes.

Along with Riesling, Sauvignon blanc was one of the first fine wines to be bottled with a screwcap in commercial quantities, especially by New Zealand producers. The wine is usually consumed young and does not particularly benefit from aging, as varietal Sauvignon blancs tend to develop vegetal aromas reminiscent of peas and asparagus with extended aging. Dry and sweet white Bordeaux, including oak-aged examples from Pessac-Léognan and Graves, as well as some Loire wines from Pouilly-Fumé and Sancerre are some of the few examples of Sauvignon blancs with aging potential.

Sauvignon blanc, when slightly chilled, pairs well with fish or cheese, particularly chèvre. It is also known as one of the few wines that can pair well with sushi. The grape is also a component of the famous dessert wines from Sauternes and Barsac.

The first Friday in May is International Sauvignon Blanc Day.

== History ==
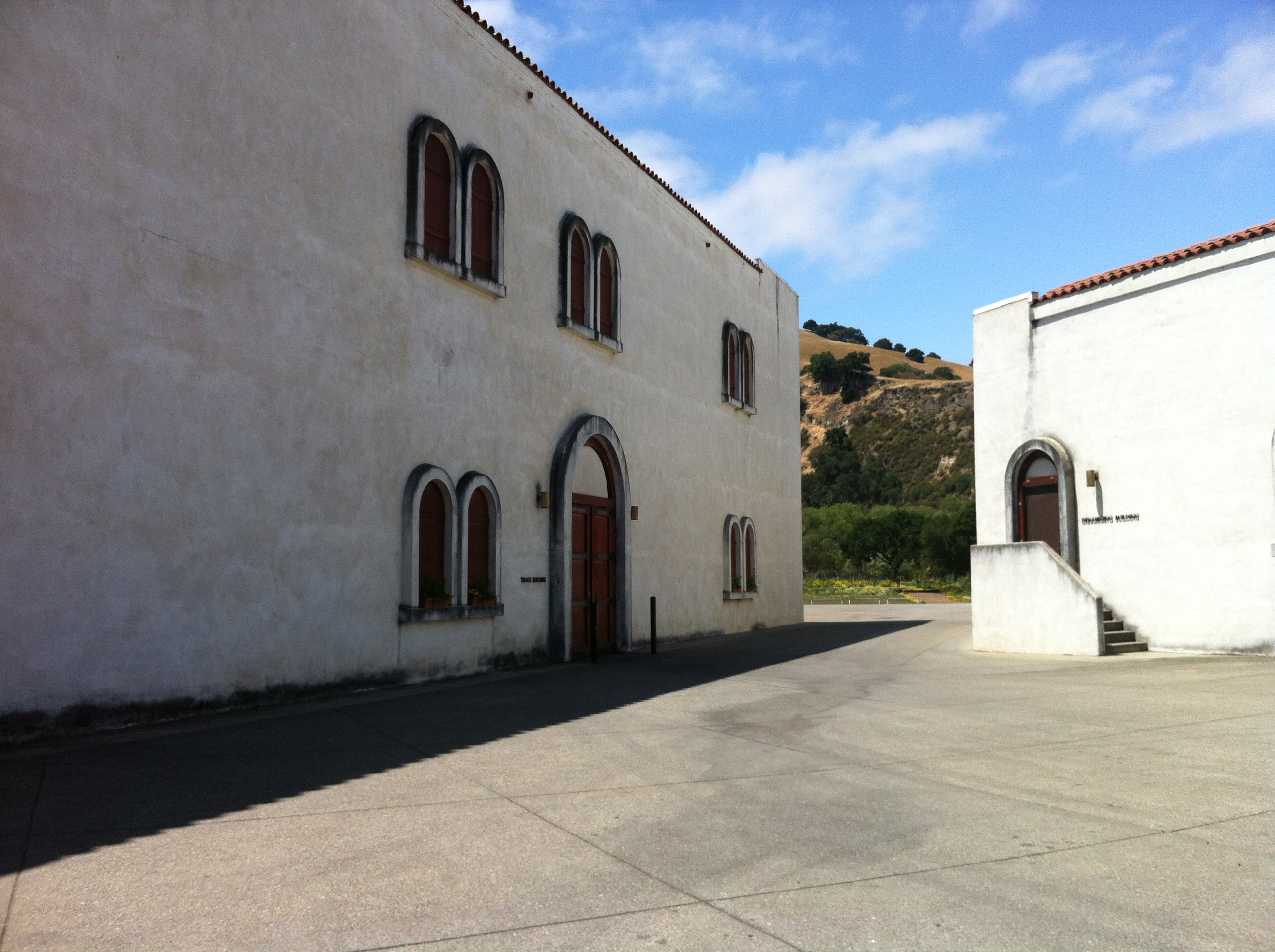
The first plantings of Sauvignon blanc were introduced into California at Cresta Blanca Winery in the Livermore Valley.

The Sauvignon blanc grape traces its origins to the Val de Loire region in France according to Jancis Robinson in her book "Wine Grapes". The earliest recording was in 1534 by Francois Rabelais in his book, Gargantua. As noted above, it is not clear that the vine originated in western France. Ongoing research suggests it may have descended from Savagnin. It has also been associated with the Carmenere family. At some point in the 18th century, the vine paired with Cabernet Franc to parent the Cabernet Sauvignon vine in Bordeaux. In the 19th century, plantings in Bordeaux were often interspersed with Sauvignon vert (In Chile, known as Sauvignonasse) as well as the Sauvignon blanc pink mutation Sauvignon gris. Prior to the phylloxera epidemic, the insect plague which devastated French vineyards in the 19th century, these interspersed cuttings were transported to Chile where the field blends are still common today. Despite the similarity in names, Sauvignon blanc has no known relation to the Sauvignon rosé mutation found in the Loire Valley of France.

The first cuttings of Sauvignon blanc were brought to California by Charles Wetmore, founder of Cresta Blanca Winery, in the 1880s. These cuttings came from the Sauternes vineyards of Château d'Yquem. The plantings produced well in Livermore Valley. Eventually, the wine acquired the alias of Fumé Blanc in California by promotion of Robert Mondavi in 1968. The grape was first introduced to New Zealand in the 1970s as an experimental planting to be blended with Müller-Thurgau.

== Climate and geography ==
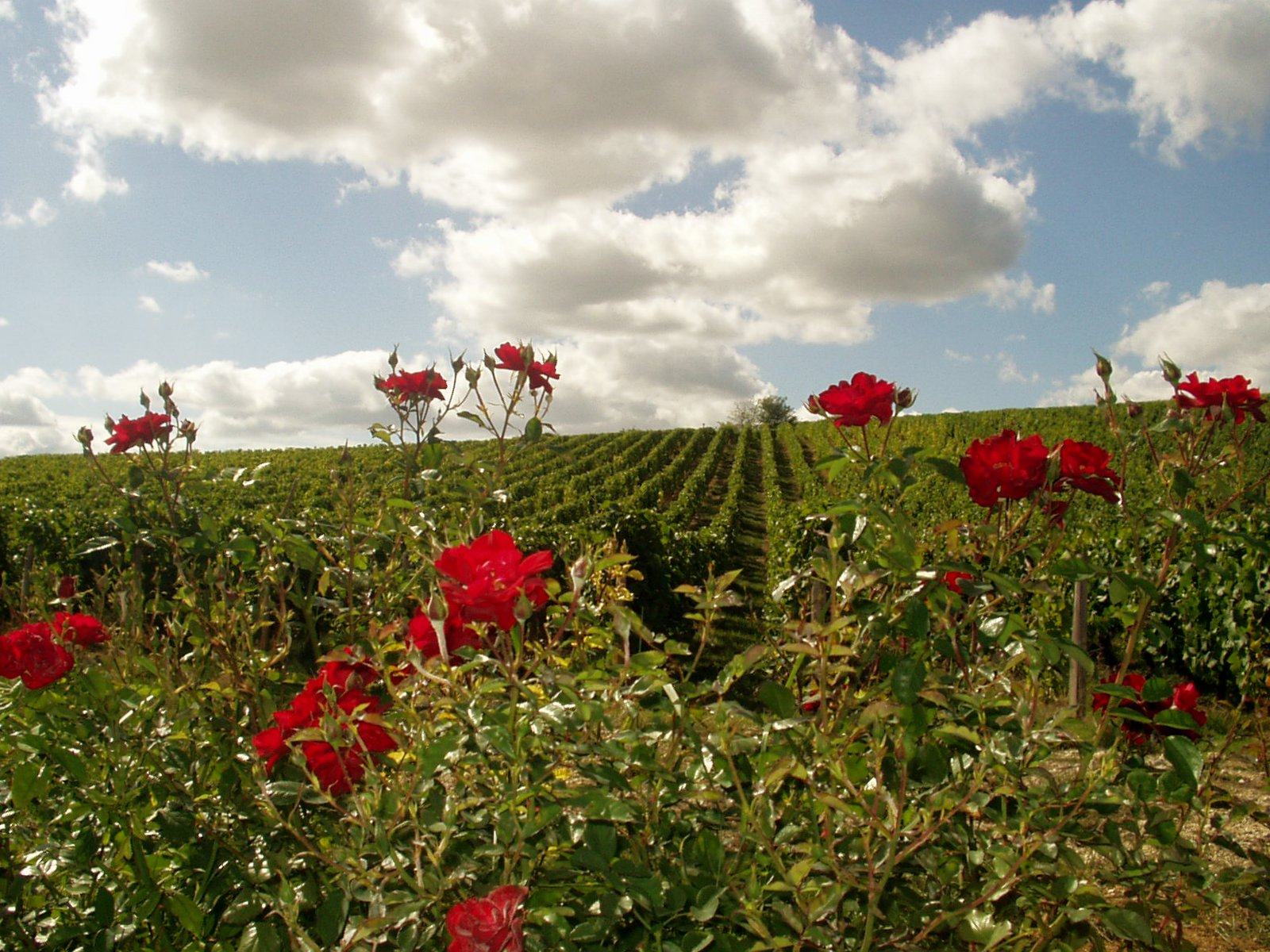
Vineyards in Sancerre will often plant roses around Sauvignon blanc vines as an early detector of powdery mildew.

The Sauvignon blanc vine often buds late but ripens early, which allows it to perform well in sunny climates when not exposed to overwhelming heat. In warm regions such as South Africa, Australia and California, the grape flourishes in cooler climate appellations such as the Alexander Valley area. In areas where the vine is subjected to high heat, the grape will quickly become over-ripe and produce wines with dull flavors and flat acidity. Rising global temperatures have caused farmers to harvest the grapes earlier than they have in the past.

The grape originated in France, in the regions of Bordeaux and the Loire Valley. Plantings in California, Australia, Chile and South Africa are also extensive, and Sauvignon blanc is steadily increasing in popularity as white wine drinkers seek alternatives to Chardonnay. The grape can also be found in Italy and Central Europe.

== Wine regions ==
=== Australia ===
In Australia, particularly the Margaret River region, the grape is often blended with Sémillon. Varietal styles, made from only the Sauvignon blanc grape, from Adelaide Hills and Padthaway have a style distinctive from their New Zealand neighbors that tend to be more ripe in flavor with white peach and lime notes and slightly higher acidity.

=== Chile and Brazil ===
In the early 1990s, ampelographers began to distinguish Sauvignon blanc from Sauvignonasse plantings in Chile. The character of non-blended Chilean Sauvignon blanc are noticeably less acidic than the wines of New Zealand and more similar to the French style that is typical of Chilean wines. The region of Valparaíso is the most notable area for Sauvignon blanc in Chile due to its cooler climate which allows the grapes to be picked up to six weeks later than in other parts of Chile. In Brazil, ampelographers have discovered that the vines called Sauvignon blanc planted in the region are really Seyval blanc.

=== France ===
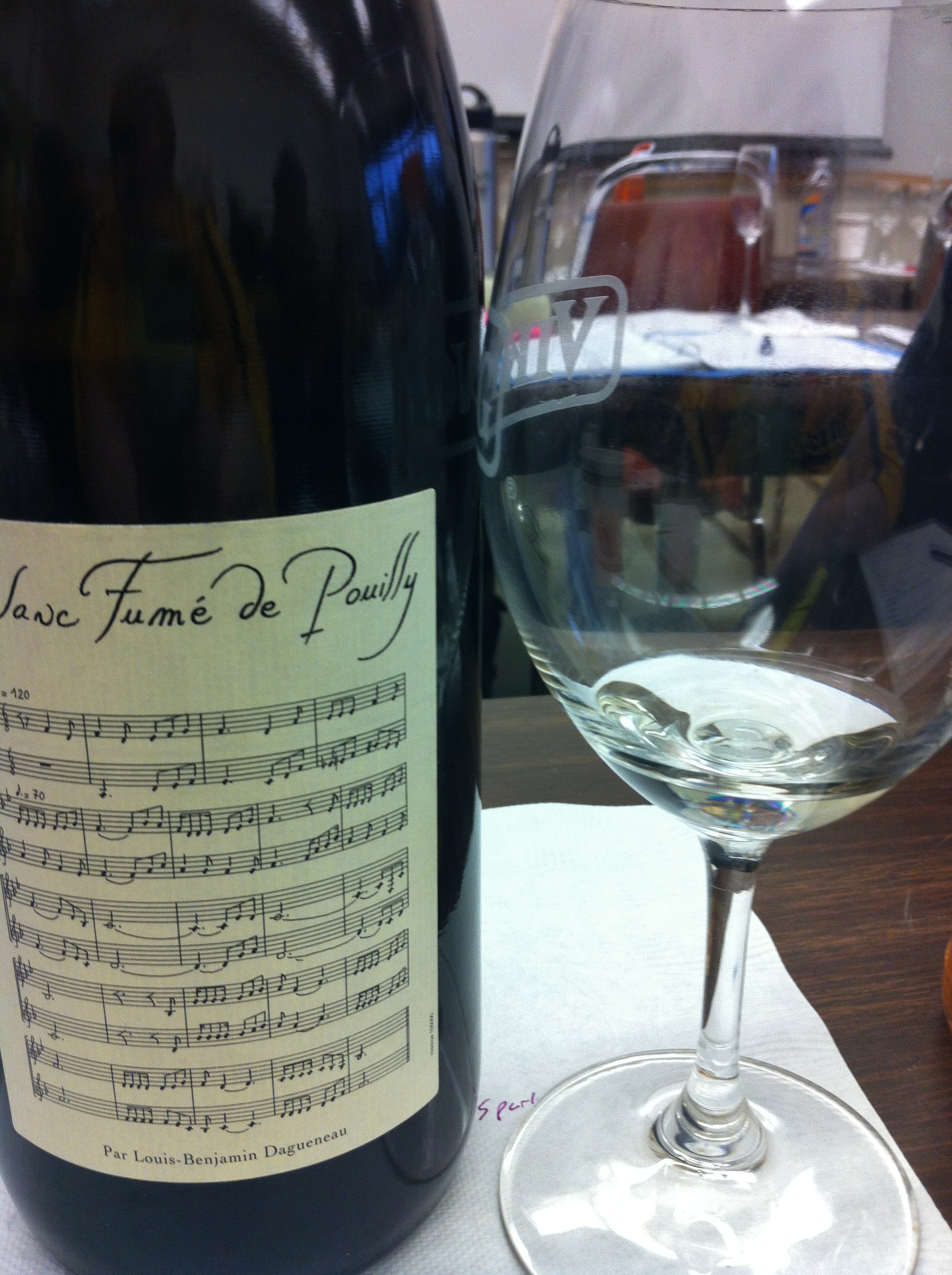
A Pouilly Fumé from the Loire Valley

In France, Sauvignon blanc is grown in the maritime climate of Bordeaux (especially in Entre-Deux-Mers, Graves and Pessac-Léognan as a dry wine, and in Sauternes as a sweet wine) as well as the continental climate of the Loire Valley (as Pouilly Fumé, Sancerre, and Sauvignon de Touraine). The climates of these areas are particularly favorable in slowing the ripening on the vine, allowing the grape more time to develop a balance between its acidity and sugar levels. This balance is important in the development of the intensity of the wine's aromas. Winemakers in France pay careful attention to the terroir characteristics of the soil and the different elements that it can impart to the wine. The chalk and Kimmeridgean marl of Sancerre and Pouilly produces wines of richness and complexity while areas with more compact chalk soils produces wines with more finesse and perfume. The gravel soil found near the river Loire and its tributaries impart spicy, floral and mineral flavors while in Bordeaux, the wines have a fruitier personality. Vines planted in flint tend to produce the most vigorous and longest lasting wines.

Pouilly Fumé originate from the town of Pouilly-sur-Loire, located directly across the Loire River from the commune of Sancerre. The soil here is very flinty with deposits of limestone, which the locals believed imparted a smoky, gunflint flavor to the wine, and hence Fumé, the French word for "smoky", was attached to the wine. Along with Sémillon, Muscadelle and Ugni blanc, Sauvignon blanc is one of only four white grapes allowed in the production of white Bordeaux wine. Mostly used as a blending grape, Sauvignon blanc is the principal grape in Château Margaux's Pavillon Blanc, In the northern Rhône Valley, Sauvignon Blanc is often blended with Tressallier to form a tart white wine.

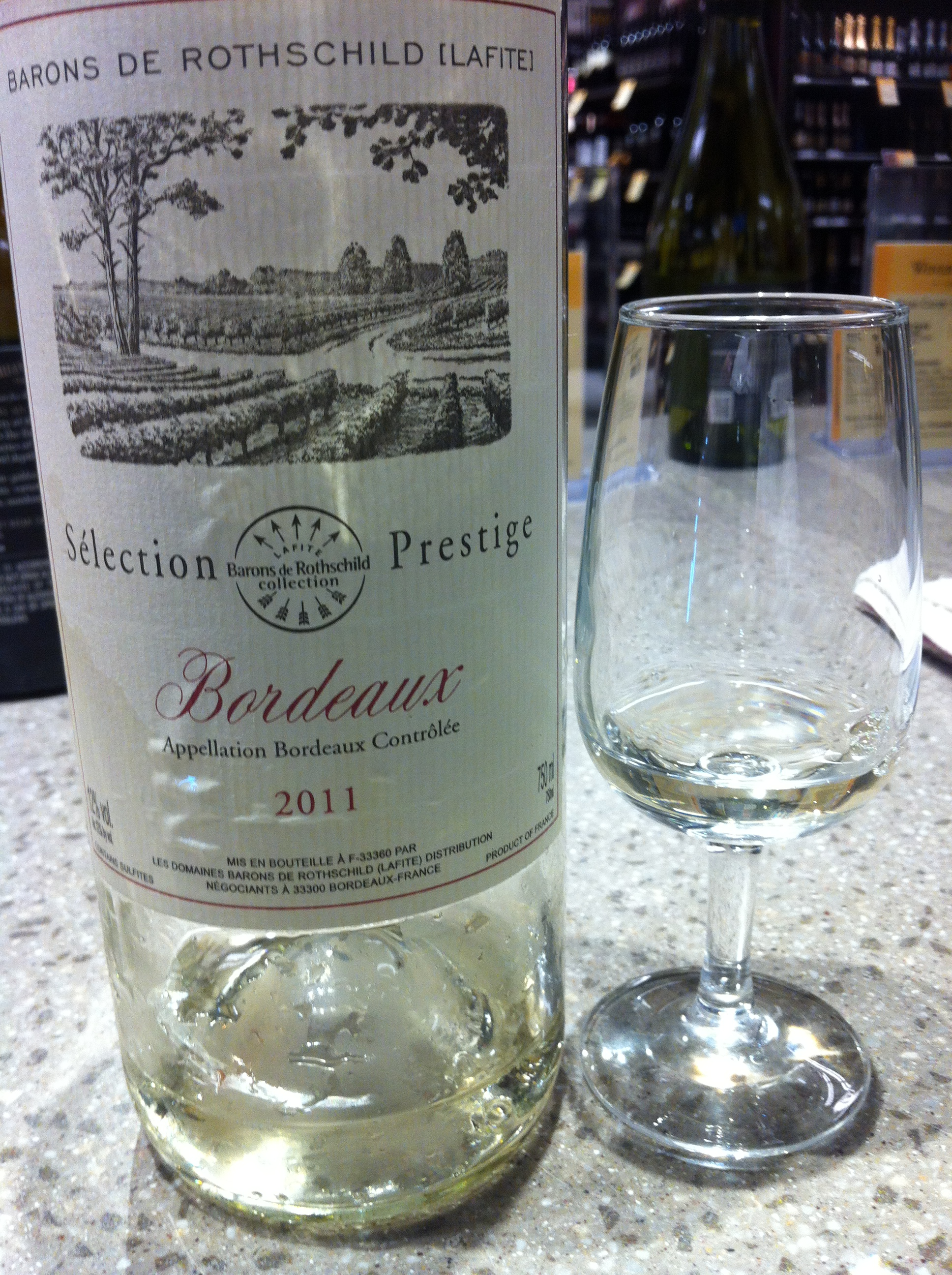
A dry white Bordeaux made from a blend of Sauvignon blanc and Sémillon

In the Sauternes region, the grape is blended with Sémillon to make the late harvest wine, Sauternes. The composition of Sauvignon blanc varies from producer and can range from 5-50% with the Premier Cru Supérieur Château d'Yquem using 20%. A traditional practice often employed in Sauternes is to plant one Sauvignon Blanc vine at regular intervals among rows of Sémillon. However, Sauvignon blanc's propensity to ripen 1–2 weeks earlier can lead the grapes to lose some of their intensity and aroma as they hang longer on the vine. This has prompted more producers to isolate their parcels of Sauvignon blanc.

Near the edge of the Chablis commune is an AOC called Saint-Bris that is gaining attention for its Sauvignon blanc production.

=== New Zealand ===
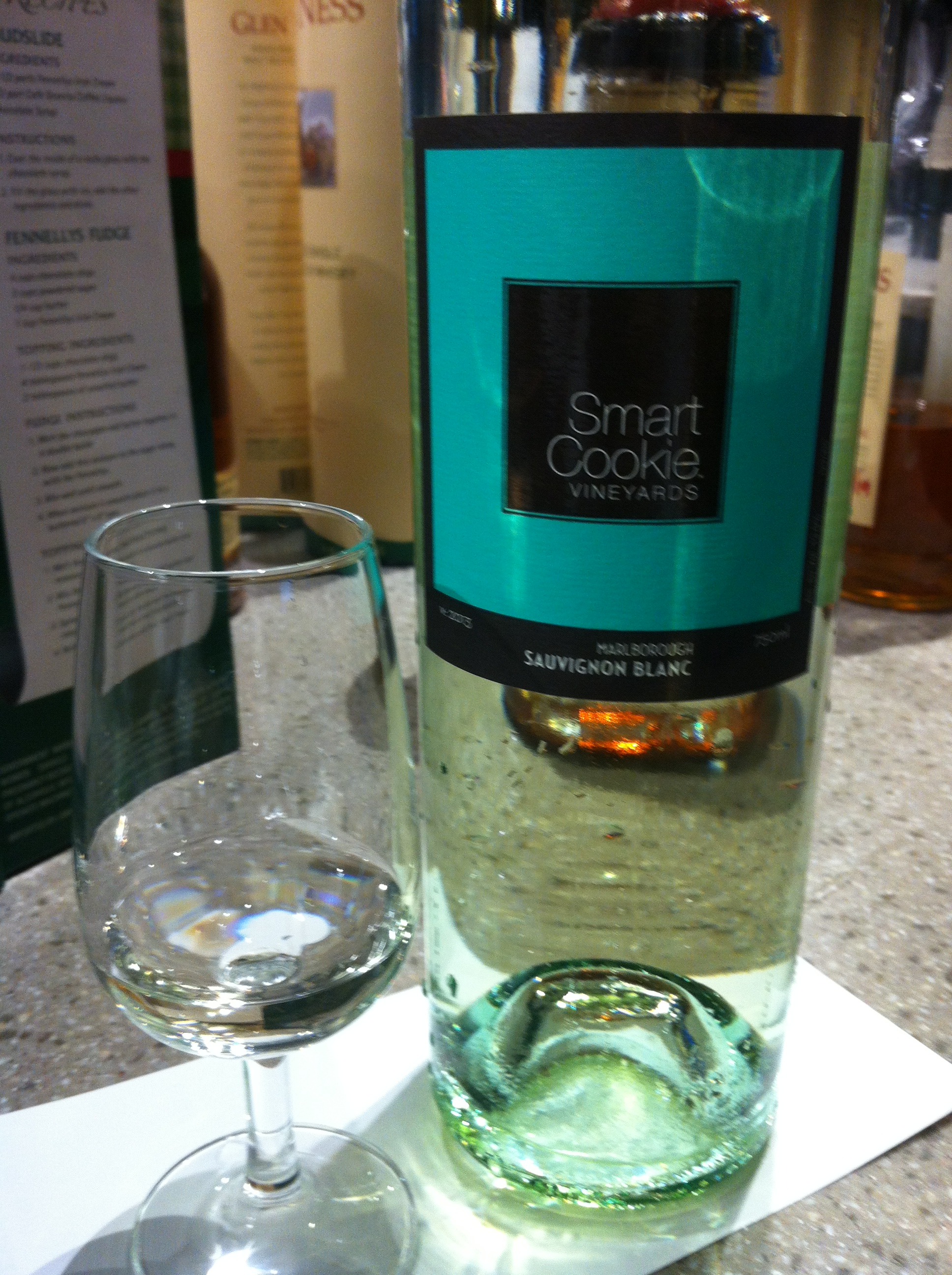
A Sauvignon blanc from Marlborough

In the 1990s, Sauvignon blanc wines from the maritime climatic regions of New Zealand, particularly the South Island, became popular on the wine market. In the Marlborough wine region, sandy soils over slate shingles have become the most desirable locations for plantings due to the good drainage of the soil and poor fertility that encourages the vine to concentrate its flavors in lower yields. In the flood plain of the Wairau River Valley, the soil runs in east-west bands across the area. This can create a wide diversity of flavors for vineyards that are planted north-south with the heavier soils producing more herbaceous wines from grapes that ripen late and vines planted in stonier soils ripening earlier and imparting more lush and tropical flavors. It is this difference in soils, and the types of harvest time decisions that wine producers must make, that add a unique element to New Zealand Sauvignon blanc.

The long narrow geography of the South Island ensures that no vineyard is more than 80 miles (130 km) from the coast. The cool, maritime climate of the area allows for a long and steady growing season in which the grapes can ripen and develop a natural balance of acids and sugars. This brings out the flavors and intensity that distinguish New Zealand Sauvignon blancs. More recently, Waipara in the South Island and Gisborne and Hawkes Bay in the North Island have been attracting attention for their Sauvignon blanc releases, which often exhibit subtle differences to those from Marlborough. The asparagus, gooseberry and green flavor commonly associated with New Zealand Sauvignon blanc is derived from flavor compounds known as methoxypyrazines that becomes more pronounced and concentrated in wines from cooler climate regions. Riper flavors such as passion fruit, along with other notes such as boxwood, may be driven by thiol concentrations.

=== North America ===
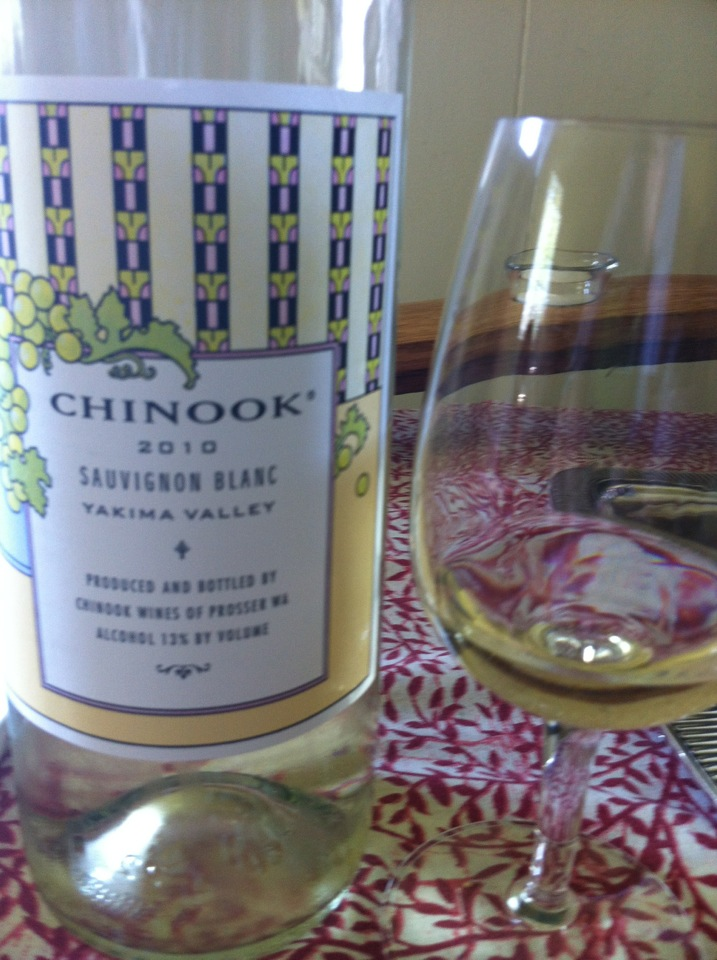
A Sauvignon blanc from the Yakima Valley of Washington State

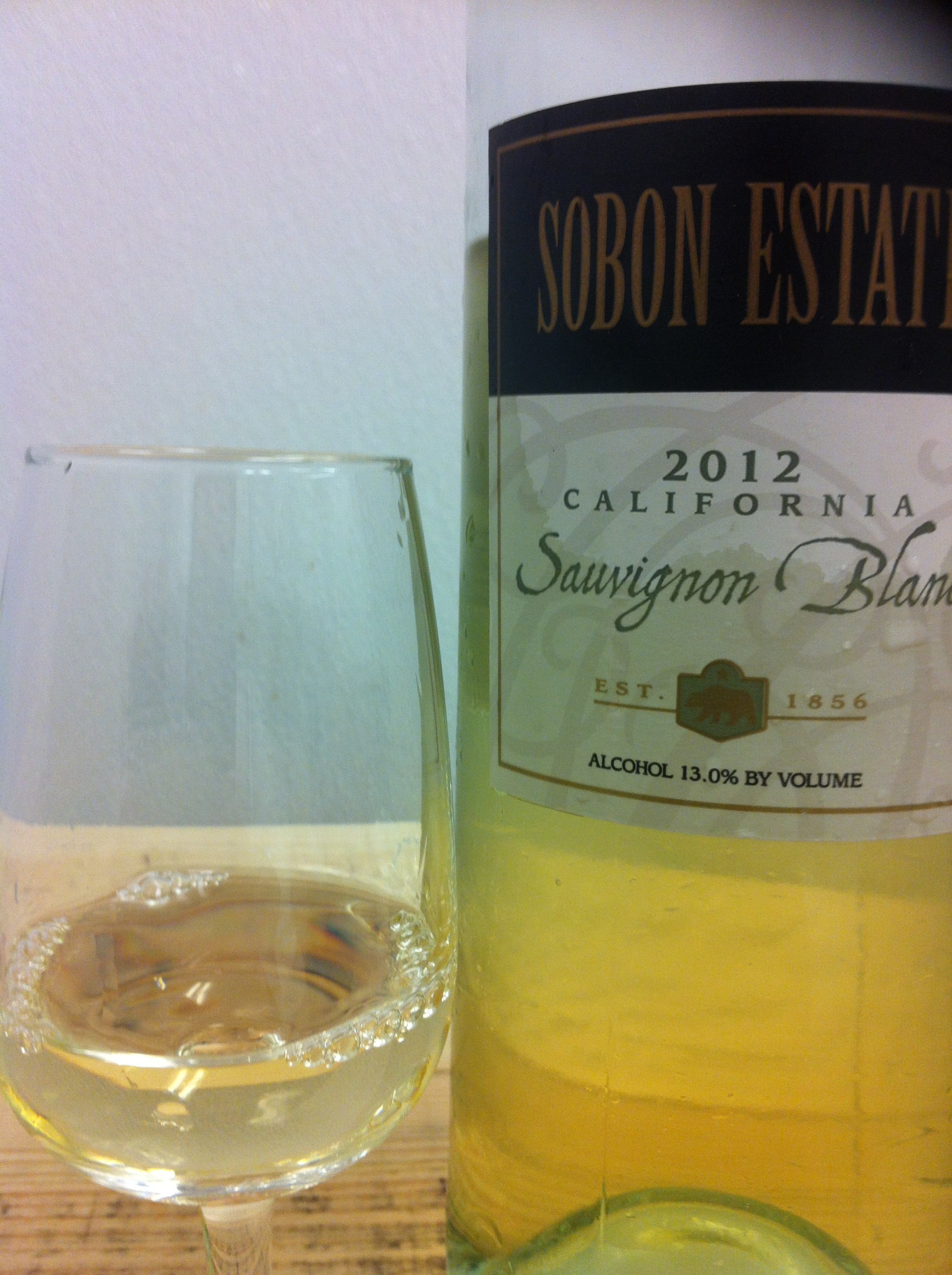
A California Sauvignon blanc

In North America, California is the leading producer of Sauvignon blanc with plantings also found in the Washington state and on the Short Hills Bench of the Niagara Peninsula and Okanagan Valley in Canada. Sauvignon Blanc is also grown in small regions in Ohio along Lake Erie and the Ohio River. In California wine produced from the Sauvignon blanc grape is also known as Fumé Blanc. This California wine was first made by Napa Valley's Robert Mondavi Winery in 1968. Mondavi had been offered a crop of particularly good Sauvignon blanc grapes by a grower. At that time the variety had a poor reputation in California due to its grassy flavor and aggressive aromas. Mondavi decided to try to tame that aggressiveness with barrel agings and released the wine under the name Fumé Blanc as an allusion to the French Pouilly-Fumé. The usage of the term is primarily a marketing base one with California wine makers choosing whichever name they prefer. Both oaked and unoaked Sauvignon blanc wines have been marketed under the name Fumé Blanc. California Sauvignon blancs tend to fall into two styles. The New Zealand-influenced Sauvignon blanc have more grassy undertones with citrus and passion fruit notes. The Mondavi-influenced Fumé Blanc are more round with melon notes.

=== Other regions ===
Sauvignon blanc is also beginning to gain prominence in areas like South Africa's Stellenbosch and Durbanville and Italy's Collio Goriziano areas. It is also one of the main ingredients in Muffato della Sala, one of Italy's most celebrated sweet wines.

== Winemaking ==
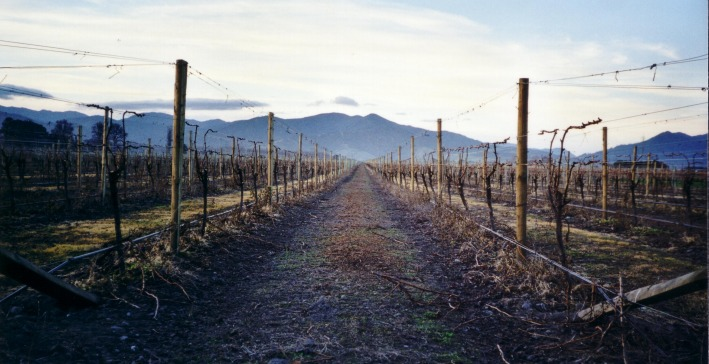
Sauvignon blanc vineyards in Marlborough, New Zealand, demonstrating restrictive pruning practices

Winemakers in New Zealand and Chile harvest the grapes at various intervals for the different blending characteristics that the grape can impart depending on its ripeness levels. At its most unripe stage, the grape is high in malic acid. As it progresses further towards ripeness the grape develops red & green pepper flavors and eventually achieves a balance of sugars. The flavors characteristic of Sauvignon blanc come from the chemicals methoxypyrazines. Grapes grown in Marlborough's Wairau Valley may exhibit different levels of ripeness over the vineyard, caused by slight unevenness in the land and giving a similar flavor profile to the resulting wine.

Sauvignon blanc can be greatly influenced by decisions in the winemaking process. One decision is the amount of contact that the must has with the skins of the grape. In the early years of the New Zealand wine industry, there were no wineries in the South Island, which meant that freshly harvested grapes had to be trucked and then ferried to the North Island, often all the way up to Auckland. This allowed for prolonged exposure of the skins and juice which sharpened the intensity and pungency of the wine. Some winemakers, like the Loire, intentionally leave a small amount of must to spend some time in contact with the skin for later blending purposes. Other winemakers, like in California, generally avoid any contact with the skin due to the reduced aging ability of the resulting wine.

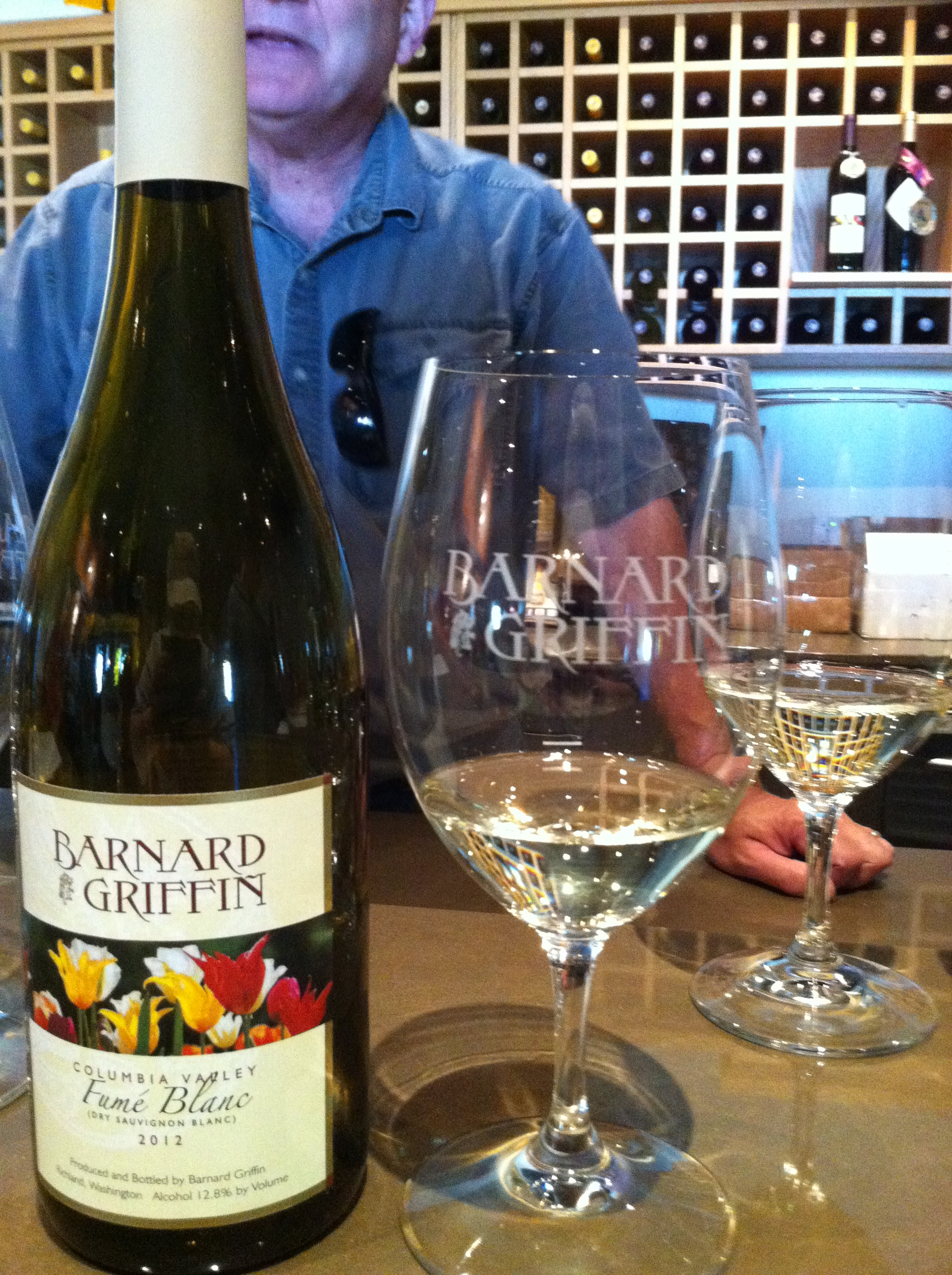
A Sauvignon blanc from Washington State labeled as a Fumé Blanc

Another important decision is the temperature of fermentation. French winemakers prefer warmer fermentations (around 16–18 °C) that bring out the mineral flavors in the wine while New World winemakers prefer slightly cooler temperatures to bring out more fruit and tropical flavors. A small minority of Loire winemakers will put the wine through malolactic fermentation, a practice more often associated with New Zealand wines. Oak aging can have a pronounced effect on the wine, with the oak rounding out the flavors and softening the naturally high acidity of the grape. Some winemakers, like those in New Zealand and Sancerre, prefer stainless steel fermentation tanks over barrels with the intention of maintaining the sharp focus and flavor intensity.

Sauvignon blanc can be combined with a variety of dishes as it is an easy approachable wine. If a light meat is wanted, chicken or turkey could be suitable to have with the wine. Sauvignon blanc can also be good with seafood such as lobster, squid, and so on. It can also be had soft cheeses such as feta, chevre or buffalo mozzarella. Vegetable dishes that contain eggplant or zucchini and spices such as thyme or bay leaves can also be a good pick to have in combination with the wine.

== See also ==
- International variety
