= Krstač =

Variety of grape

- Grape (Vitis)
- Color of berry skin: Blanc
- Species: Vitis vinifera
- Also called: see list of synonyms
- Origin: Montenegro

Krstač (Cyrillic: Крстач) is an ancient variety of grape that is indigenous to Serbia and Montenegro. A high quality dry white wine is made from it. The wine may be rich, of harmonious bouquet and of light yellow color with 12.5% alcohol.

== Synonyms ==
Krstač is also known under the synonyms Beli Krstac, Bijela Krata, Bijela Loza, Bijela Vinogradarska, Bijeli Krstac, Krata Bijela, Krsta Bijela, Krstac Bijeli, Krstaca Bijela, Krstach Bianco, Loza Bijela, and Vinogradarska Bijela.

== See also ==
- Plantaže – a Montenegrin wine and brandy company
