= Plantaže =

Montenegrin wine and brandy company

- Company type: Joint-stock company
- Industry: Beverage
- Founded: 1963; 63 years ago
- Headquarters: Podgorica, Montenegro
- Products: Wine, grape brandy
- Revenue: ▼€ 30.5 million (2014)
- Net income: ▼€ 1.96 million (2014)
- Number of employees: 700 (2017)
- Website: www.plantaze.com/en/

Plantaže (Montenegrin: Плантаже, pronounced [plantǎːʒɛ]; MNSE: PLAP) is a Montenegrin wine and grape brandy producer.

Company 13.jul Plantaže is the owner of the biggest vineyard in one piece in Europe - vineyard Ćemovsko polje, which has more than 2,000 ha. They are the most awarded winery in Montenegro.

Winery has 3 wine cellars, and two of them are the real tourist attraction - wine cellar Stari podrum and the wine cellar Šipčanik.

== Overview ==
AD Plantaže, a joint stock company presently incorporated into holding company "Agrokombinat 13 jul", is the biggest Montenegrin viticultural and winemaking company, and one of the biggest companies in Montenegro overall. The company is based in the Montenegrin capital of Podgorica.

It was founded in 1963, and deals with the production of wine and table grapes, peach, production and distribution of wine and grape brandies, fish farming, catering and retail trade. The most important segment of the company is related to the production of grapes and wine, and it owns one of the largest vineyards in Europe with over 2,310 ha (23 km^{2}) surface, covered with more than 11 million grapevines. The vineyards are situated in the Ćemovsko polje, a flat and sunny area located south of Podgorica.

AD Plantaže is one of the largest producers of grapes and wine in the region, with an annual production of wine grapes close to 22 million kg, and 17 million bottles sold annually. The company exports its products to over 30 countries, and is the market leader in its sector in the Balkans region.

== Products ==
=== Wines ===
Sparkling wines ( Method Champenoise)

- Val Brut
- Val suvi
- Val Rose

=== Red wines ===
- Vranac
- Merlot
- Cabernet
- Kratošija
- Vranac Pro Corde
- Vladika ( Vranac, Merlot & Cabernet blend)
- Epoha (Merlot&Cabernet Sauvignon)
- Vranac Pro Corde
- Vranac barrique
- Vranac Reserve
- Stari podrum selection
- Grand Reserve 2005 (Archive wine)

Rose wines

Regina (Cabernet Sauvignon)

- White wines:
  - Chardonnay
  - Krstač
  - Malvazija
  - Pro anima Pinot blanc
  - Pro anima Chardonnay&Sauvignon
  - Luča
  - Chardonnay barrique
  - Nota

=== Grape brandies ===
- Montenegrin Grape Brandy (Lozova rakija)
- Prvijenac
- Kruna

== See also ==
- List of companies of the Socialist Federal Republic of Yugoslavia
