= Terrantez =

Variety of grape

Terrantez (also known as Cascal) is a now-rare white Portuguese wine grape variety that was once widely used on the island of Madeira to make the sweet fortified wine for which the island is known. By the 1990s, the variety was nearly extinct on Madeira, due to a combination of low yields and the mid-19th century oidium (powdery mildew) and phylloxera epidemics that devastated the island's vineyards. The variety has experienced a slow revival in recent years, but as of 2021, plantings on Madeira remain limited to 5.64 hectares (13.9 acres). The Madeiran government has led replanting efforts from 2016 in the form of free viticultural advice and subsidies to growers. There are still some limited plantings in the Minho Province where, as Cascal, is a permitted blending variety with Alvarinho and other grapes in the Denominação de Origem Controlada (DOC) wine Vinho Verde. As Terrantez the grape is permitted in several of the Indicação de Proveniencia Regulamentada (IPR) regions of the Azores including Biscoitos IPR on Terceira Island, Graciosa IPR on the island of Graciosa and Pico IPR on Pico Island.

== History ==
Terrantez is one of Madeira's five traditional noble white grape varieties (along with Sercial, Verdelho, Bual and Malvasia). The precise origins of the grapes are unknown; it is thought to have originated from mainland Portugal alongside those varieties. Widely planted in the 18th and early 19th centuries, the variety was nearly wiped out by the oidium epidemic of 1851, and phylloxera, which was introduced to the island in 1872. As late as 2006, it was declared that there were "practically no Terrantez vines left at all on the island (Madeira)". In recent years, commercial interest in the variety has slowly increased. To encourage new plantings of the variety, the government Wine, Embroidery and Handicraft Institute of Madeira (IVBAM) has since offered growers free viticultural advice and a €1.30 subsidy per kilogram of grapes harvested since 2016. Plantings of Terrantez on the island have gradually increased: in 2012, 1.52 hectares (3.8 acres) of Terrantez was reported to be under vine. This had increased to 4.08 hectares (10.1 acres) by 2019, with 22 registered growers. IVBAM data from 2021 indicates 5.64 hectares (13.9 acres) of Terrantez plantings, split between 36 growers.

== Regions ==
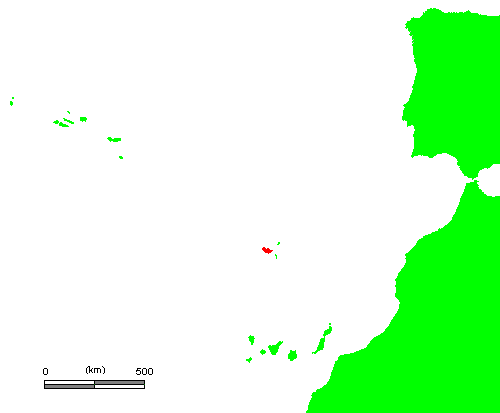
Terrantez is most widely associated with the wines of the island of Madeira (in red) but some plantings of the grapes can also be found in the Azores (in green to the northwest of Madeira).

Terrantez is a low-yielding vine that is most widely associated with the wines of Madeira though its use in the wine and presence on the island had declined until a fairly recent revival. Some plantings of the variety can still be found in the Azores, the Portuguese island chain located northwest of Madeira in the Northern Atlantic Ocean. There is also some plantings of in the Minho province on the Portuguese mainland though ampelographer Paul Truel has speculated that the mainland variety (known most often as Cascal) may actually be a different variety, though this has not been conclusively determined.

As of 2021, plantings of the variety on Madeira were mainly split between the Câmara de Lobos (2.02 hectares (5.0 acres)), Calheta (1.11 hectares (2.7 acres)), and Santa Cruz (1.15 hectares (2.8 acres)) municipalities. All other municipalities (Funchal, Ponta do Sol, Porto Moniz, Ribeira Brava, Santana, São Vicente) each had less than 0.4 hectares (0.99 acres) of plantings, and the Machico municipality had no Terrantez plantings at all.

== Wine styles ==
Terrantez can be produced in medium dry (meio seco) or medium sweet (meio doce) styles. The grape has the potential to make rich full-bodied wines with highly perfumed bouquet. According to wine expert Oz Clarke, in older bottles of Madeira Terrantez has shown an ability to age well in developing wines with long finishes and layers of complexity.

Commercial and grower interest in Terrantez has increased in recent years, partly due to the grape's scarcity. Low production volumes mean that Terrantez is generally bottled as a single-vintage wine (garrafeira/frasqueira), though both Henriques & Henriques and Blandy's produce age-dated (20 year old) expressions.

== Synonyms and other varieties ==
In addition to Cascal, Terrantez has been known under a variety of a synonyms including: Morrao, Murrao, Pe de Perdiz, Pe de Perdrix, Pied de Perdix and Terrantes.

Several other white Portuguese grape varieties share synonyms with Terrantez and may be related though there is not yet any conclusive evidence. These include Folgasao which has the synonyms of Terrantez da Madeira and Terrantez de Madere and Donzelinho Branco which has the synonym of Terrantez and Terrantes.

The Portuguese red grape Alicante Bouschet also shares the Pe de Perdiz synonym with Terrantez and the French/Argentine grape Malbec is also known as Pied de Perdix.
