= Açores VR =

- Wine region
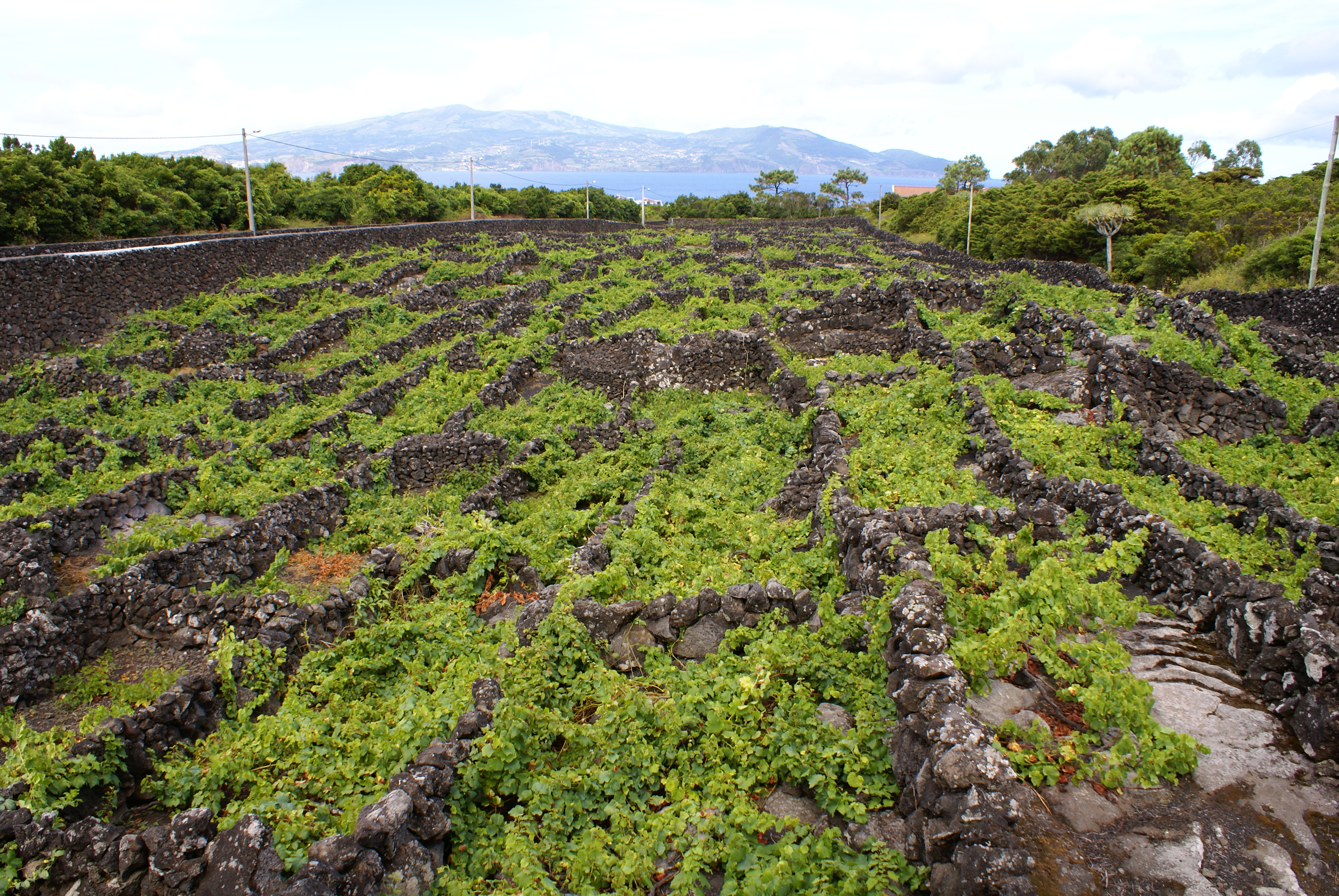
- Official name: Açores Vinho Regional
- Year established: 15th century
- Country: Portugal
- Part of: Azores
- Sub-regions: Pico, Graciosa, Biscoitos
- Climate region: Mediterranean/maritime/humid subtropical
- Soil conditions: Basalt, Trachyte, Andesite, Clay
- Total area: 1700 Ha
- Varietals produced: Red wines: Agronómica, Aragonez (Tinta Roriz), Cabernet-Franc, Cabernet Sauvignon, Castelão (Periquita), Complexa, Merlot, Pinot Noir, Rufete, Saborinho, Tinta Barroca, Touriga Franca, Touriga Nacional, Vinhão and Gewurztraminer; White wines: Arinto (Pedernã), Bical, Chardonnay, Fernão Pires (Maria Gomes), Galego Dourado, Generosa, Gouveio, Malvasia, Malvasia Fina, Moscatel Graúdo, Riesling, Rio Grande, Seara Nova, Sercial (Esgana Cão), Tália, Terrantez, Verdelho and Viosinho
- Wine produced: 13754 hL

The Açores VR (Portuguese: Açores Vinho Regional) is a Portuguese wine region located in the archipelago of the Azores. This region is classified as a Vinho Regional (VR), which corresponds to table wines with a geographical indication under European Union wine regulations, similar to a French vin de pays region.

== History ==
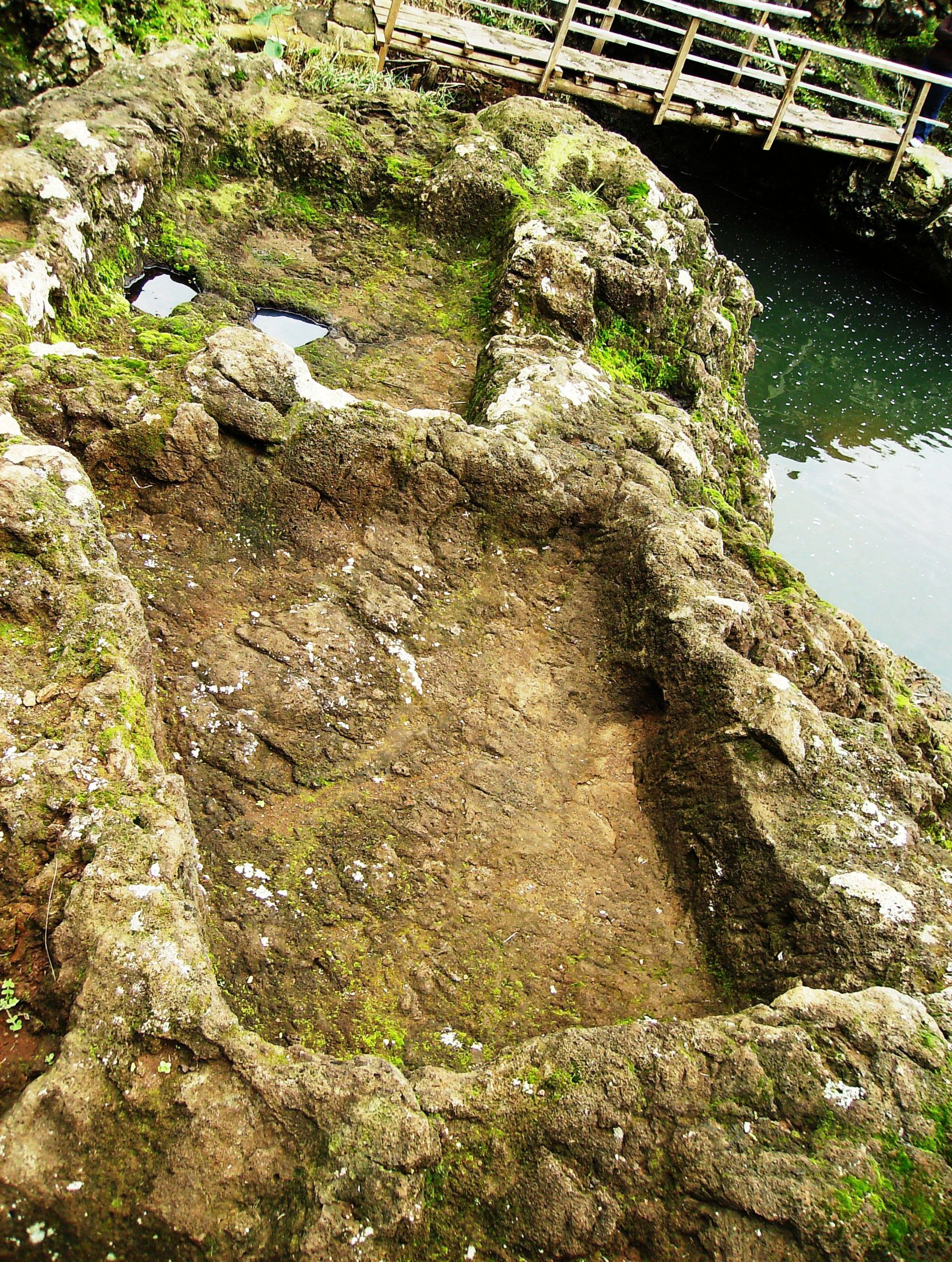
The lagar (wine press) in Maia, along the Ribeira do Aveiro on the island of Santa Maria, one of the oldest examples of manual wine pressing in the archipelago

Located in the Atlantic Ocean, some 1,600 kilometres (990 mi) from continental Portugal, the archipelago of the Azores is composed of nine islands, of which three cultivate wine-making grapes for export production: Terceira, Pico and Graciosa. Located on the American, European and African tectonic plates, the islands of the Azores originated from recent volcanism, and have soils that are shallow in depth, consisting of basalt, traquites, andesites and clay formations. Agriculture has remained an important aspect part of the region, with primarily milk-production dominating, in addition to pineapple, cereals and other greenhouse-based vegetables. The islands were colonized in the middle of the 15th century, and the first castes were introduced by Franciscan friars, who realized that the conditions in this region were comparable to Sicily and introduced the Verdelho caste (Verdecchio siciliano) which quickly spread on the islands.

The wine produced from these grapes was largely exported, particularly from the island of Pico, to much of northern Europe and Russia. After the Bolshevik revolution of 1917, many cases of Verdelho wine from Pico were found in the wine-cellars and warehouses of the Czar's residences.

The geographical designation Açores by government order 853/2004 (19 July 2004) was used to certify all the red and white wines produced throughout the archipelago.

== IPR Subregions ==
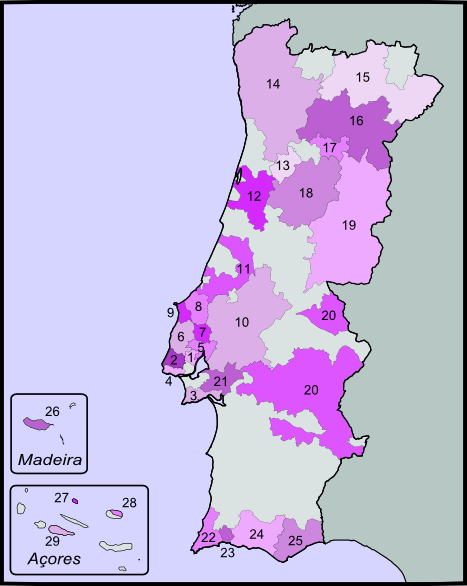
Map of the Portuguese DOCs and IPRs, showing the Açores VR, including the three IPRs of the Azores (27-Graciosa IPR, 28-Biscoitos IPR, and 29-Pico IPR)

The quality and prestige of Azorean wines have been recognized for a long time, resulting in the recognition of three Indicações de Proveniência Regulamentada (Indication of Regulated Provenance) for the wines of Pico, Graciosa and Biscoitos.

The Pico IPR wine is a white wine produced from grapes grown on the rocky soils, located along the western coast of the island. The vines used in this wine are cultivated in tiny plots, called currais, edged by walls made of loose pebbles, in order to protect the plants from the climate. The geographic area of the Controlled Appellation (Regulated Origin) Pico covers the municipalities of Madalena (the civil parishes of Madalena, Candelária, Criação Velha and Bandeiras); in the municipality of São Roque do Pico (civil parishes of Santa Luzia and part of the parish of Prainha, in the locality of Baía de Canas); and in Lajes do Pico (civil parish of Piedade, in localities of Engrade and Manhenha), in areas equal or under 100 metres (330 ft) height.

The white Graciosa IPR wines are produced from similar currais of Pico, although other variants are cultivated in more secluded areas. The geographic area of the Controlled Appellation (Regulated Origin) Graciosa covers the municipality of Santa Cruz, and specifically the civil parishes of Santa Cruz, Gudalupe, Praia and Lux, in areas equal or under 150 metres (490 ft) height.

The prestigious white wine of the Biscoitos IPR is produced from the dark and rocky volcanic soils on the island of Terceira, marked by bread-like rock formations that allowed the protection from the intemperate climate in the area. Similarly, the Biscoitos IPR producers employ small plots or curraletas, made of short walls of loose rock, to help protect the plants from the wind. The geographic area of the Controlled Appellation (Regulated Origin) Biscoitos covers in the municipality of Praia da Vitória, in the civil parish of Biscoitos, in areas equal or under 100 metres (330 ft) height.

== See also ==
- List of Portuguese wine regions
