= Pico IPR =

Portuguese wine region

- Wine region
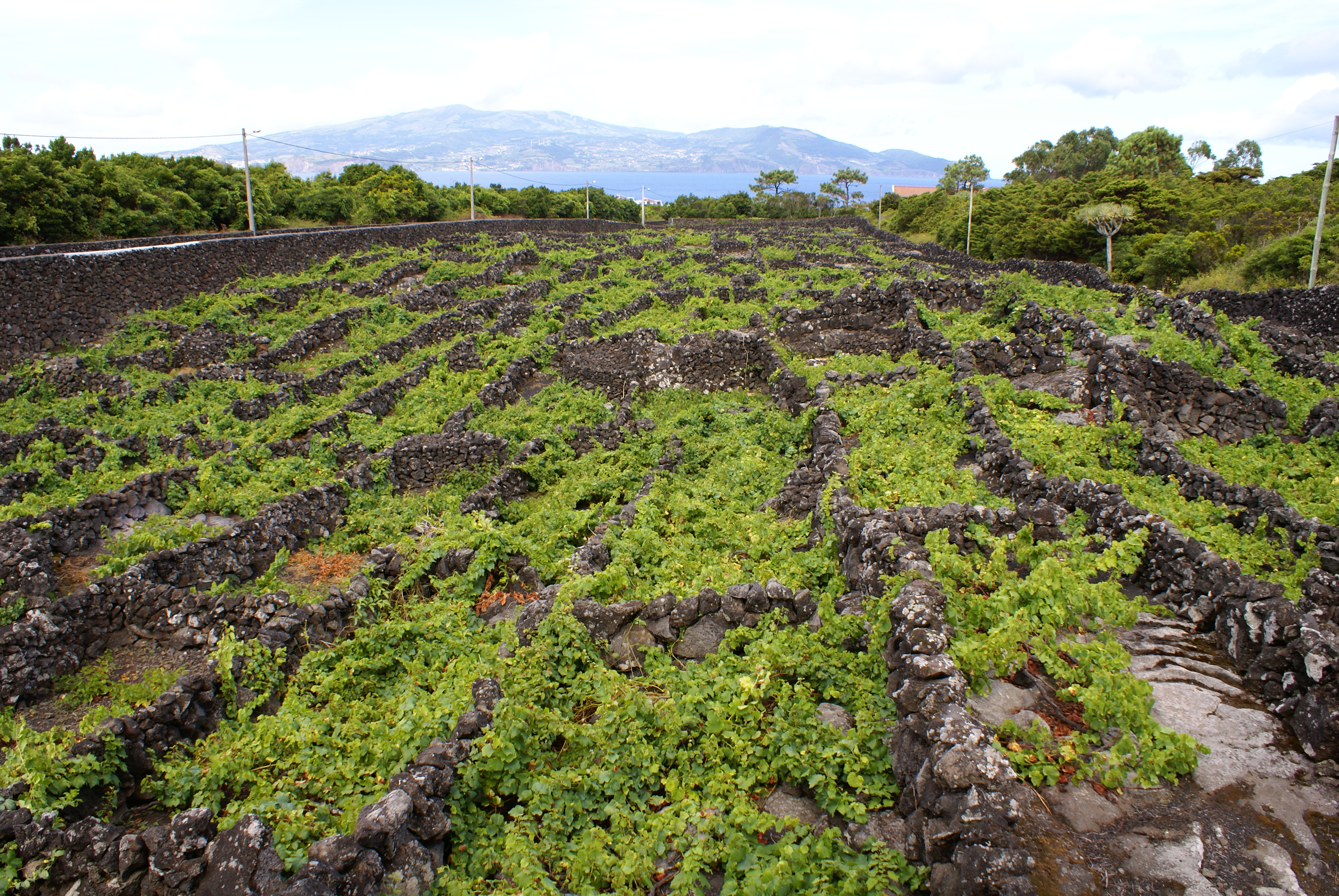
- Official name: Indicação de Proveniencia Regulamentada do Pico
- Year established: 15th century
- Country: Portugal
- Part of: Azores
- Other regions in Azores: Graciosa, Biscoitos
- Soil conditions: Basalt, Trachyte, Andesite, Clay
- Total area: 50 Ha
- Grapes produced: Arinto, Terrantez and Verdelho
- Official designation: IPR
- Comments: Comissão Vitivinícola Regional dos Açores

The Pico IPR is a Portuguese wine region located on the island of Pico in the Portuguese archipelago of the Azores. The region is designated a second-tier Indicação de Proveniencia Regulamentada (IPR) classification, and potentially may be reclassified as a product of Denominação de Origem Controlada (DOC).

The region is primarily known for fortified wines and historically for the UNESCO designation associated with the Landscape of the Pico Island Vineyard Culture.

== History ==
It is assumed that Franciscan friars brought the first grapes into the lands of Pico during the period of settlement and discovery. This clerics originally constructed churches and imported wine, essential in the celebration of masses through the archipelago. After verifying that the climatic conditions were comparable to Sicilly, they began to import various plants and wine castes, in particular, Verdelho. The vine began to proliferate easily throughout the island. Quickly, the wine produced turned famous and began to be exported into northern Europe and Russia.

With a climate characterized by weak temperature oscillation and elevated precipitation, and distributed throughout the year, allowed the production of white liqueur wines. This wine resulted from the grapes produced predominantly in the Lajido soils of the parishes. The basalt rocks are gathered together to form walls of loose volcanic rock, that protect the vines, that grow as high as 100 metres (330 ft) above sea level. This tradition, which first began on Pico and that continues today was behind the designation of Pico's Vineyard Culture as a UNESCO Heritage Site.

== Geography ==
The geographic area of the IPR covers the municipalities of Madalena (specifically the civil parishes of Madalena, Candelária, Criação Velha and Bandeiras), São Roque do Pico (parishes of Santa Luzia, Prainha and the locality of Baía de Canas), and Lajes do Pico (specifically in the parishes of Piedade, and the localities of Engrade and Manhenha), as well as areas throughout the island 100 metres (330 ft) above sea level.

== Grapes ==
The Pico IPR wine is commonly a white liqueur wine produced from grapes grown on rocky soils, located near the western coast of the island of Pico. The area of vine is quite reduced; vines are divided in tiny plots, called currais, edged by walls made of loose pebbles, with the purpose of protecting the plants from the wind.

The principle grapes of the Pico region include Arinto, Terrantez and Verdelho.

== See also ==
- List of Portuguese wine regions
