= Complexa =

Variety of grape

Complexa is red Portuguese wine grape used in the production of Madeira. The grape was created as a crossing of Castelao, Muscat Hamburg and Tintinha in the 1960s. The grape provides a deep color with less tannins than the commonly used Tinta Negra Mole.

== See also ==
- List of Portuguese grape varieties
