= Landscape of the Pico Island Vineyard Culture =

UNESCO World Heritage Site
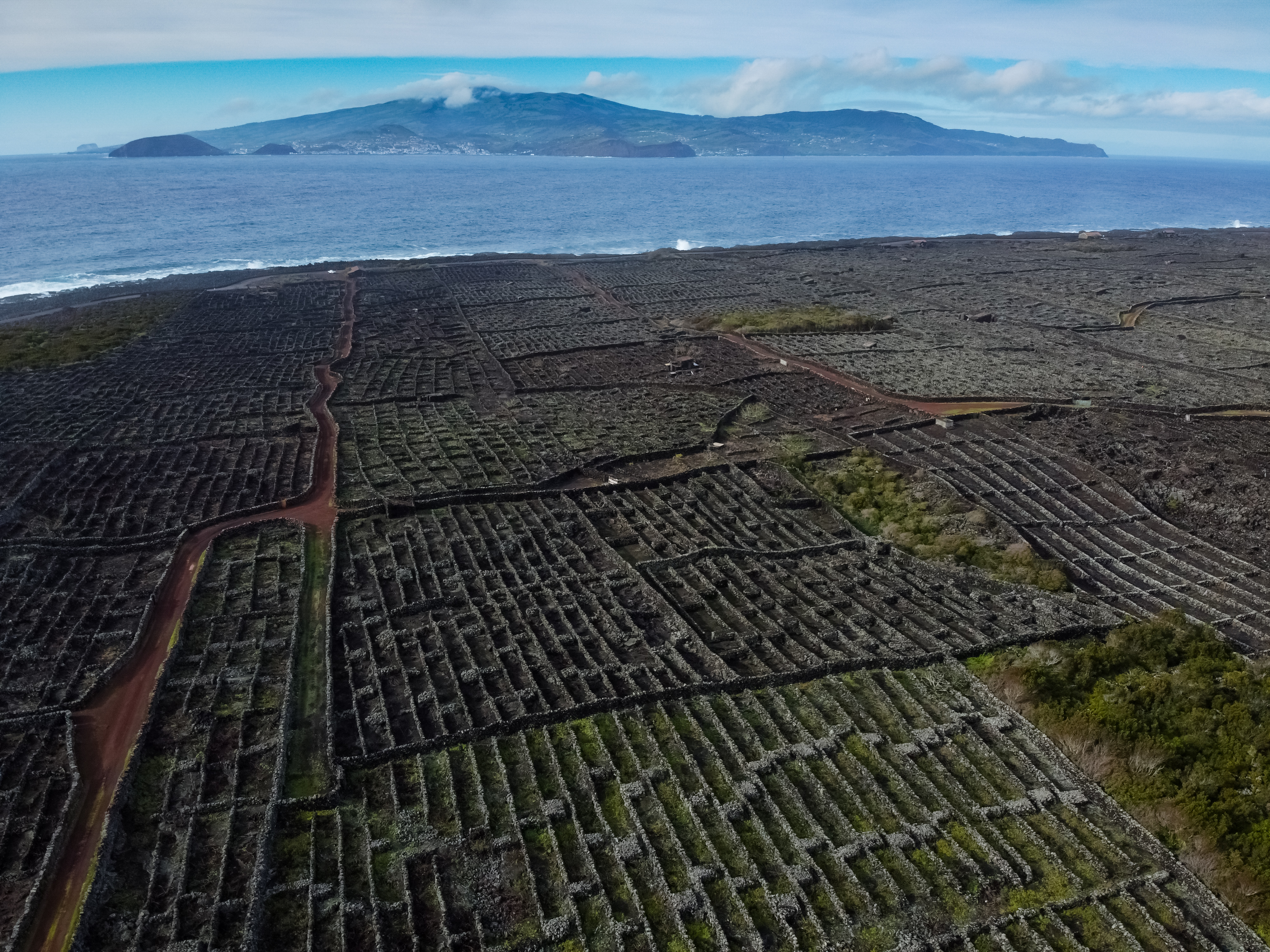
- Vineyards near Criação Velha, with Faial Island in the distance

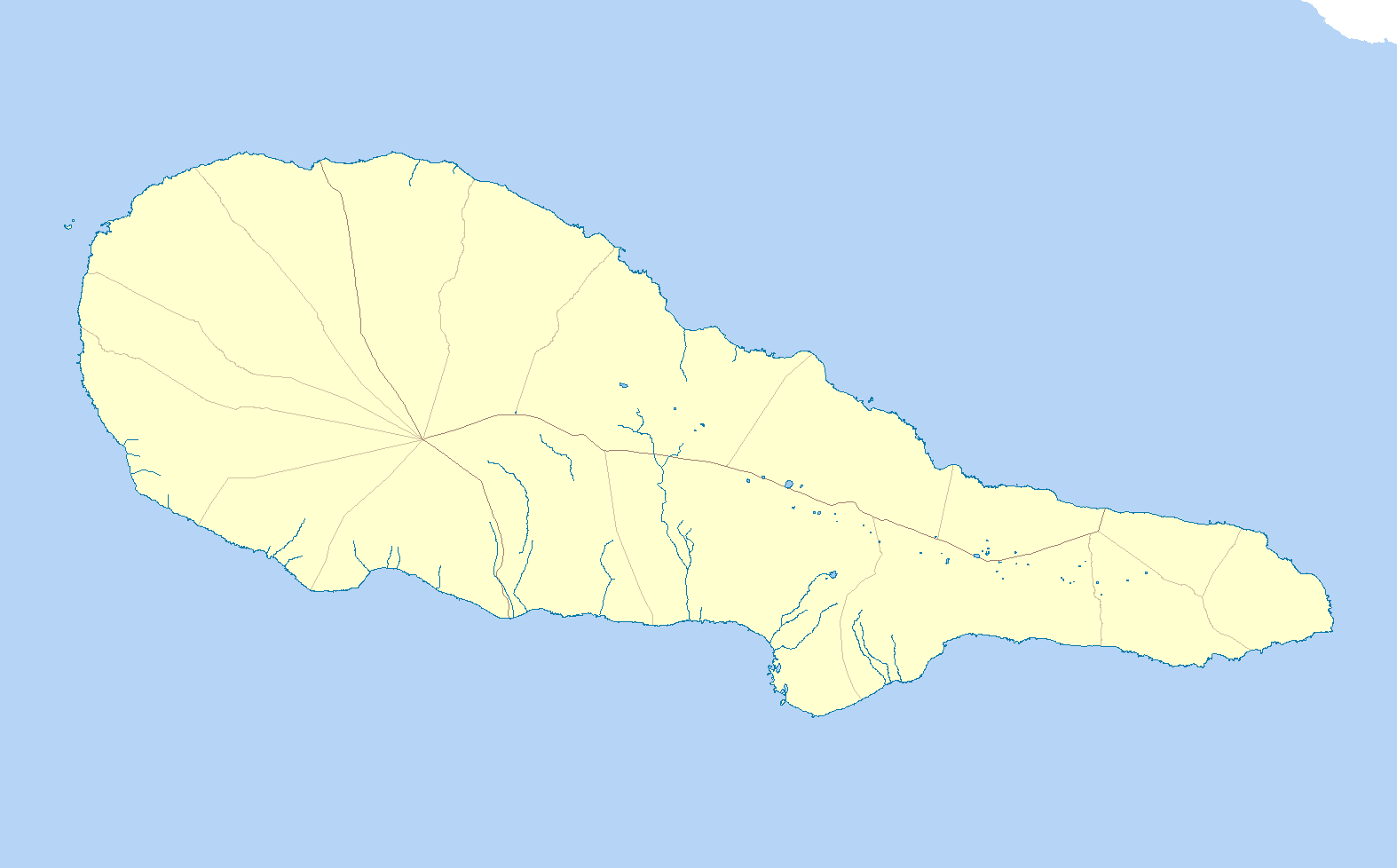
- Location within Pico Location within Azores Location within North Atlantic
- Location: Pico Island, Azores, Portugal
- Criteria: Cultural: (iii)(v)
- Reference: 1117
- Inscription: 2004 (28th Session)
- Area: 987 ha (2,440 acres)
- Buffer zone: 1,924 ha (4,750 acres)
- Coordinates: 38°33′05.6″N 28°28′05.2″W

The Landscape of the Pico Island Vineyard Culture is a Unesco World Heritage Site on Pico Island, part of the archipelago of the Azores, Portugal. The landscape is known for the network of basalt stone walls and vines planted in rectangular enclosures known as currais. Wine has been produced in the area since the late 15th century, and traditional techniques continue to be used.

== Background ==
Inscribed as a UNESCO site in 2004, the site covers an area of approximately 987 ha, and the surrounding buffer zone with 1,924 ha, extend through most of the island's western, northwestern and southwestern coasts, with the majority on the municipality of Madalena and the rest on São Roque do Pico, at the foothills of Mount Pico.

The landscape is characterized by an extensive network of long, spaced apart black basalt stone walls that run parallel to the coast and penetrate towards the interior of the island. These walls were erected to protect the vines from the wind and the salty sea spray, which are planted in thousands of small rectangular enclosures locally called currais. Also part of the landscape are the buildings (manor houses, wine cellars, warehouses, conventional houses, and churches), pathways and wells, ports and ramps, that were produced by generations of farmers enabling the production of wine. Viticulture on Pico began in the late 15th century, introduced by Portuguese settlers—including Franciscan and Carmelite monks—who adapted to the island’s harsh volcanic terrain. By the 19th century, Pico’s wines, especially the Verdelho variety, gained international renown. This landscape has evolved over 500 years and is exceptionally well-preserved and fully authentic in its setting, materials, continued use, function, traditions, techniques, and management systems.

The Landscape of the Pico Island Vineyard Culture Interpretation Centre, dedicated to teaching more about the culture and history of the region, is located in the village of Lajido de Santa Luzia.

== Gallery ==
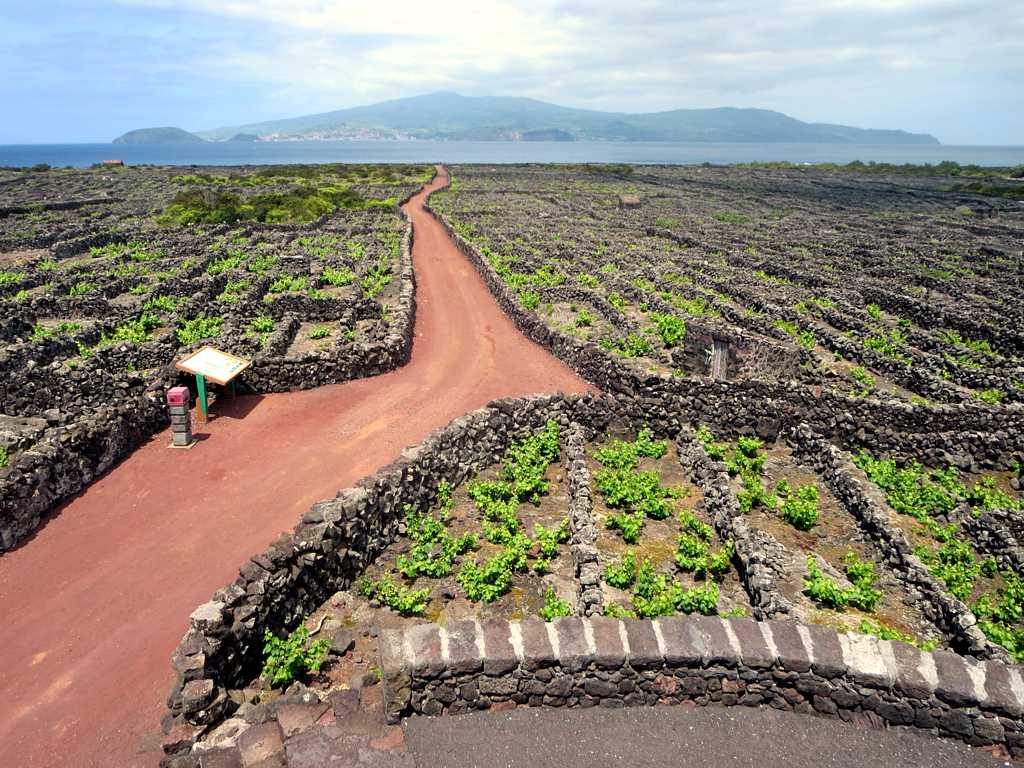

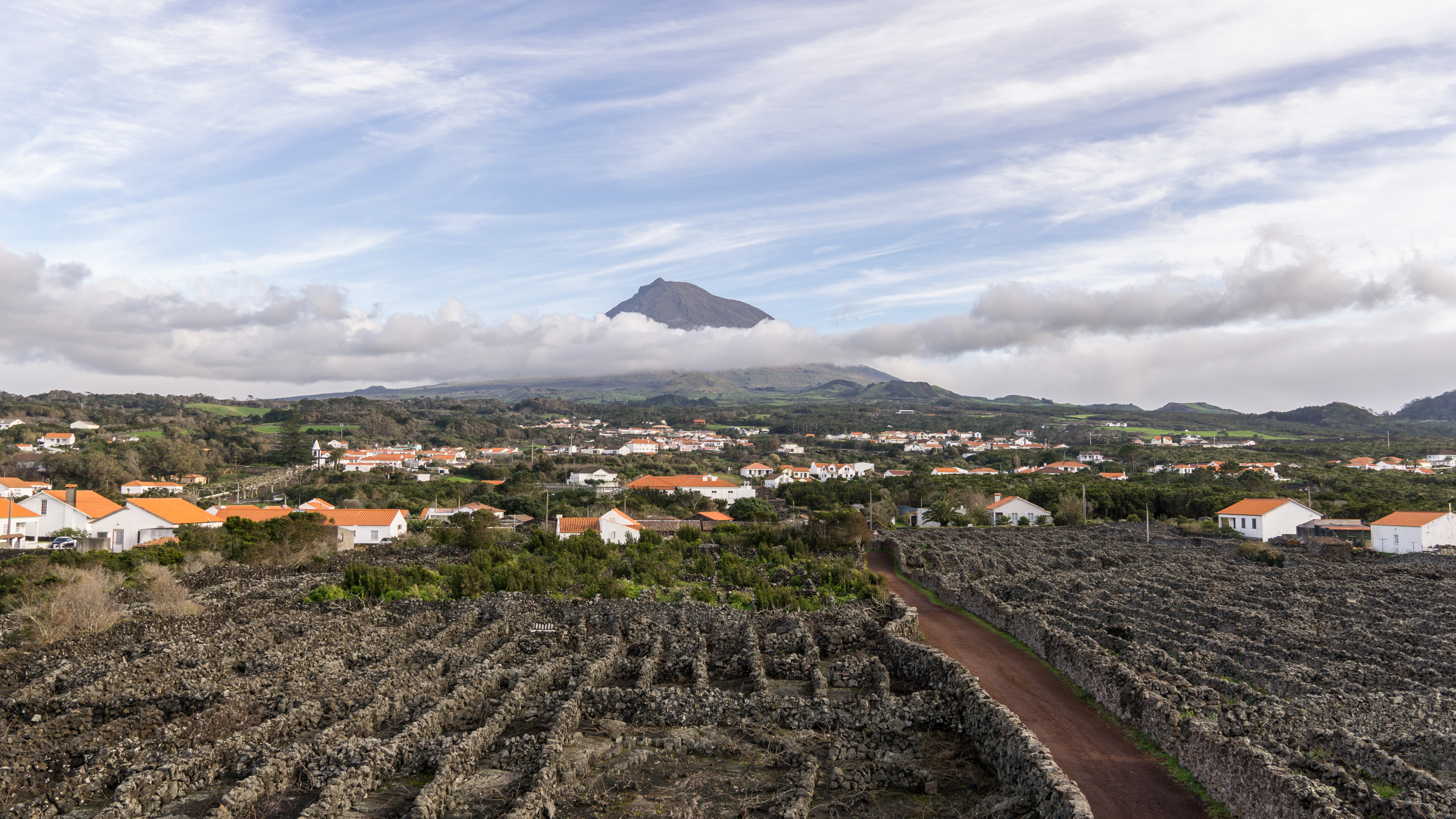

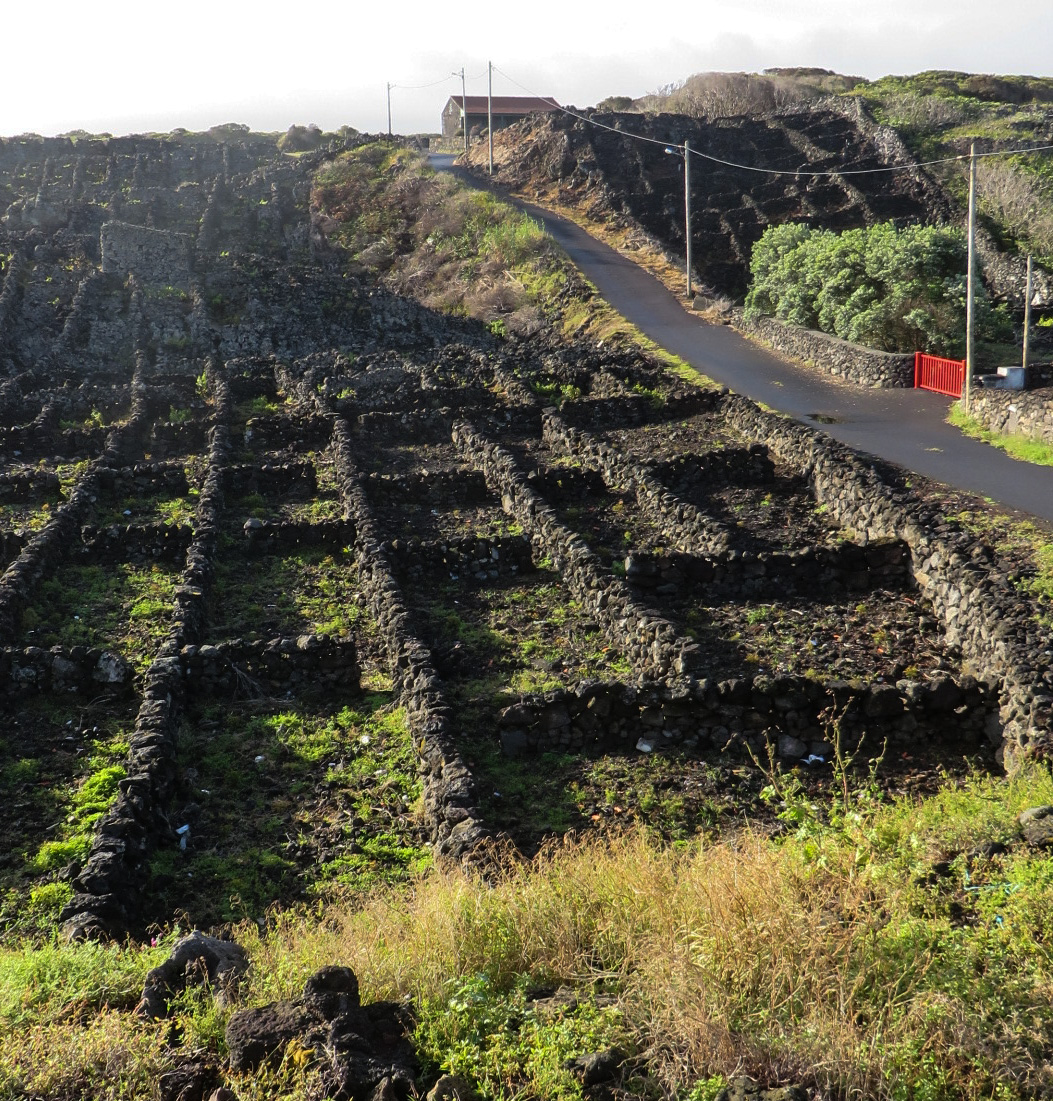
Typical protective walls and winery's house from basalt stones in the west of the island of Pico

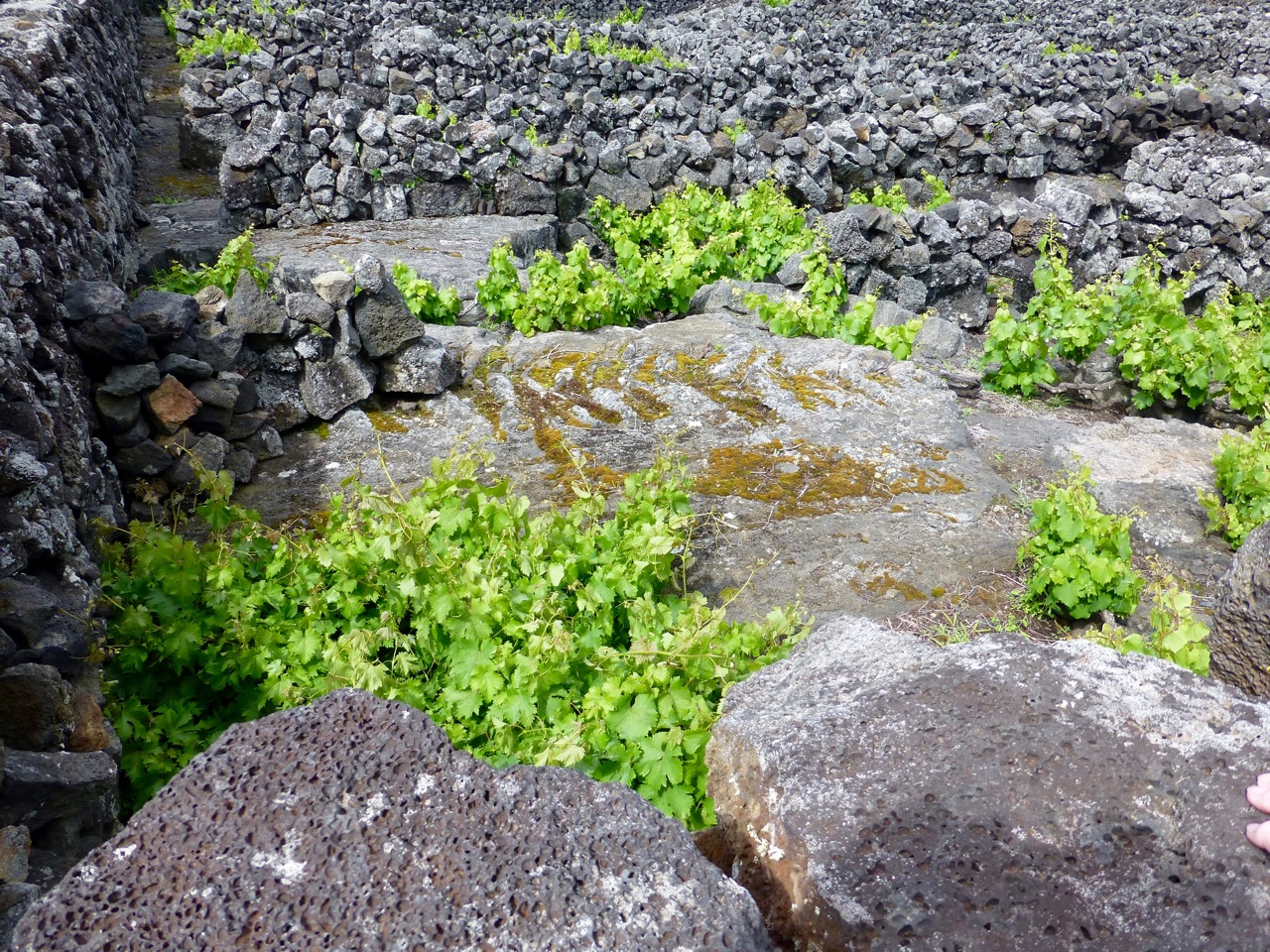
Vines planted on basaltic ground near Madalena, Pico Island, Azores.

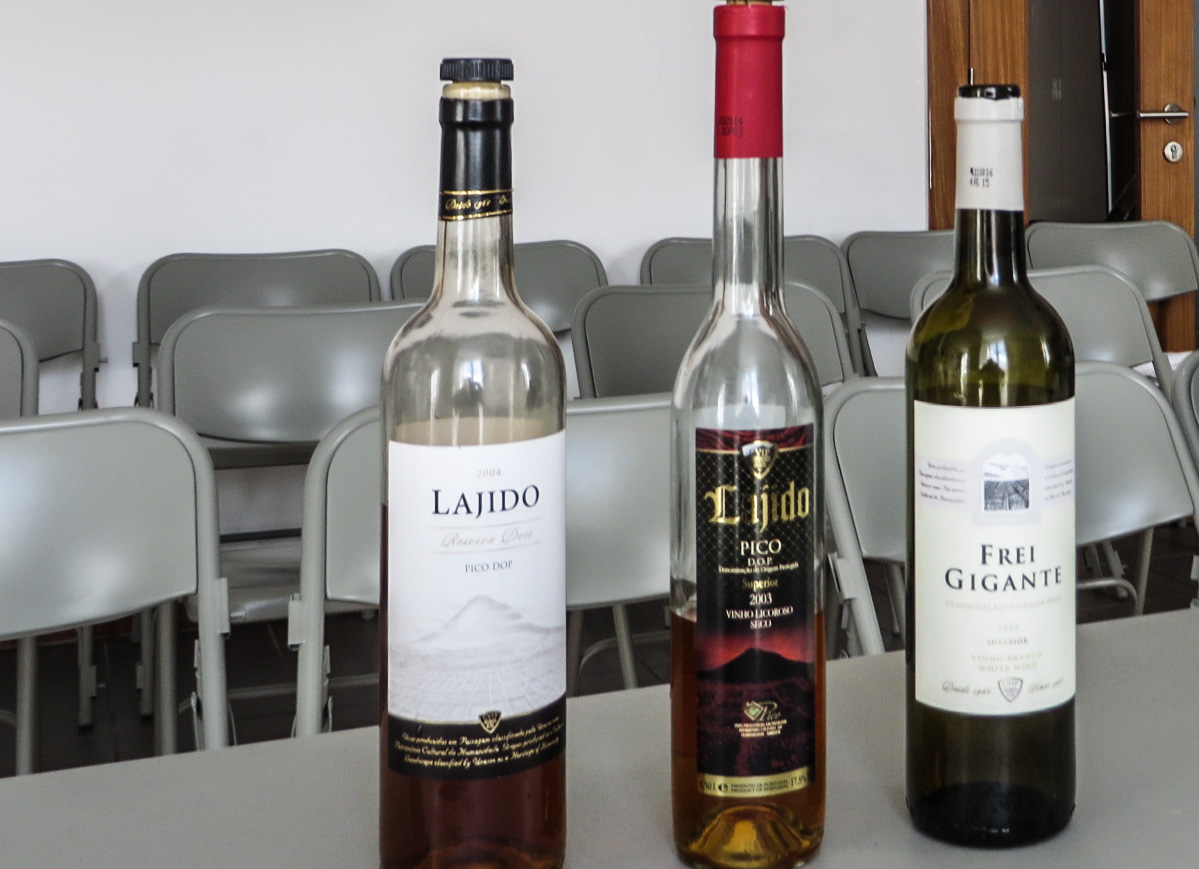
Wines from Pico Island

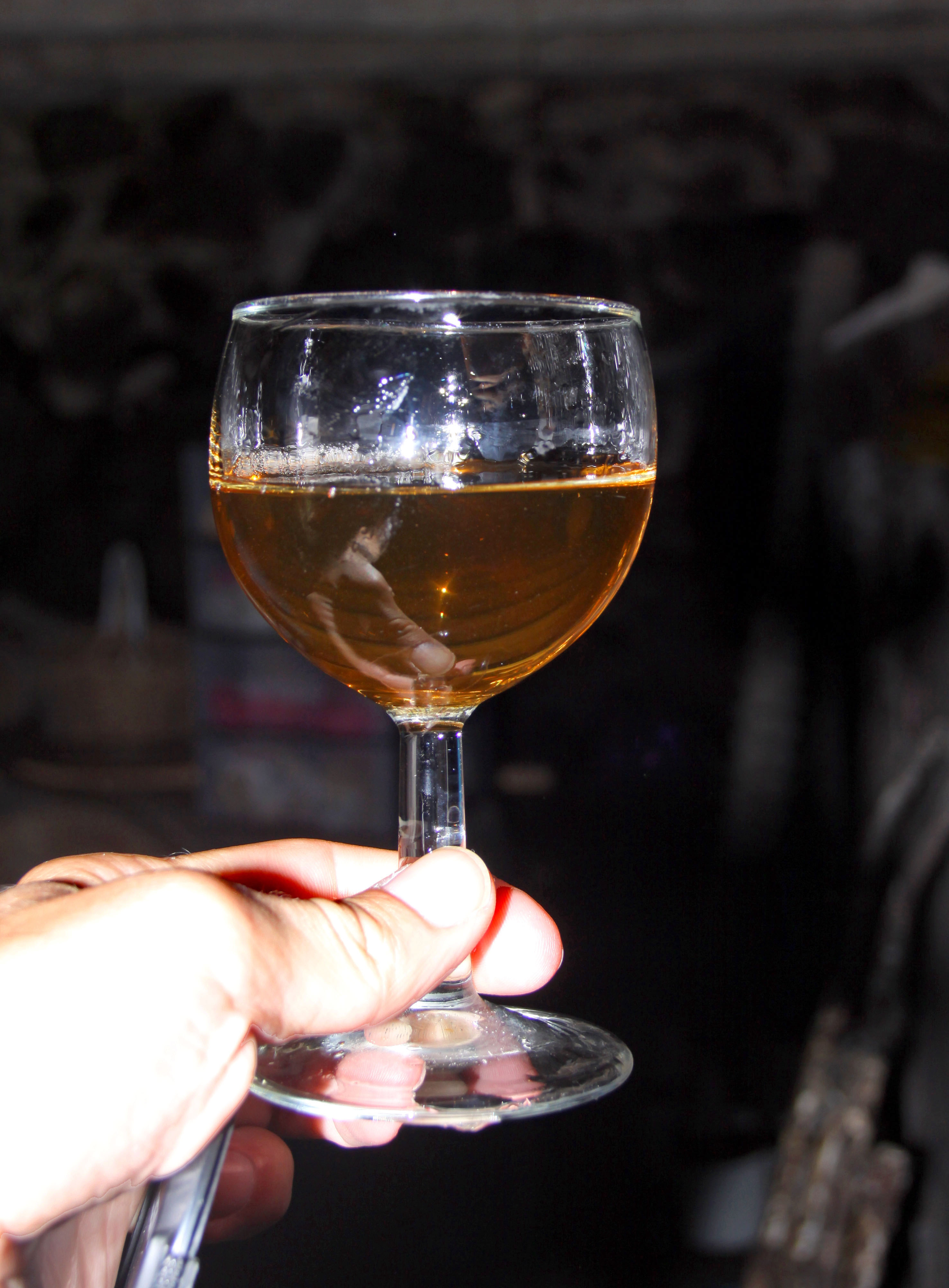

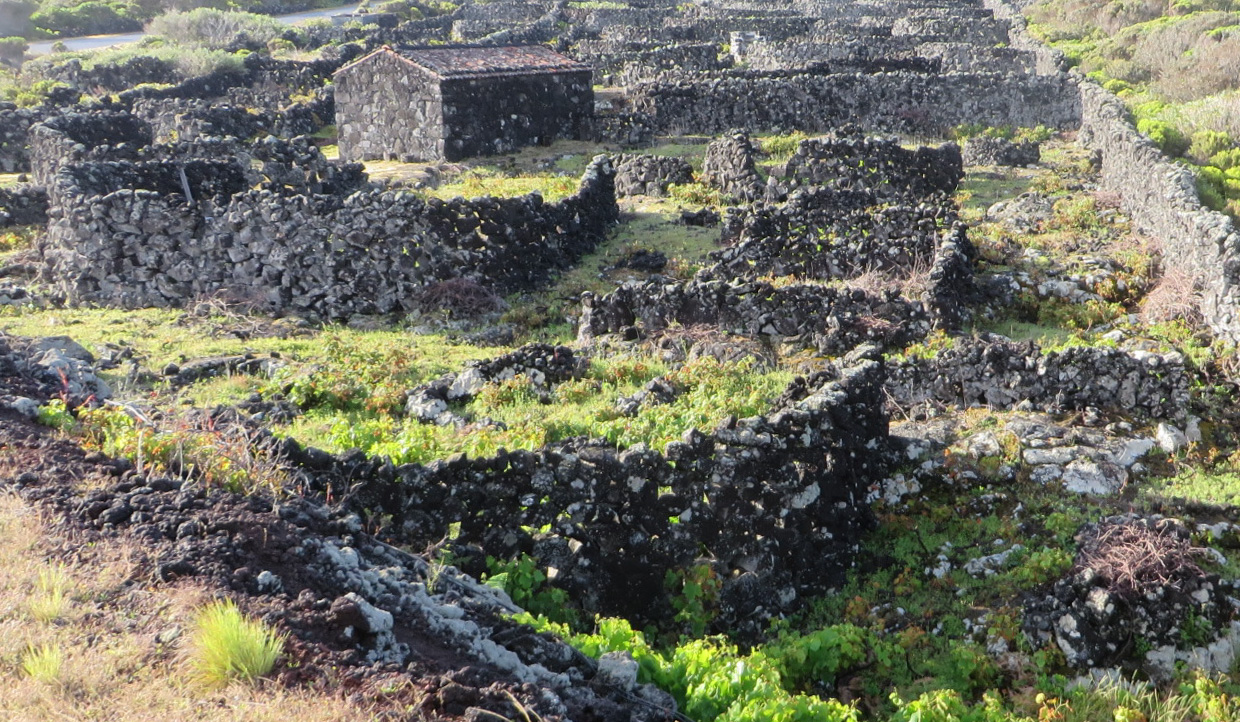
A vinery and the walls around

== See also ==
- Pico IPR, the officially demarcated wine region of Pico.
