= Terras Madeirenses wine region =

Portuguese wine region

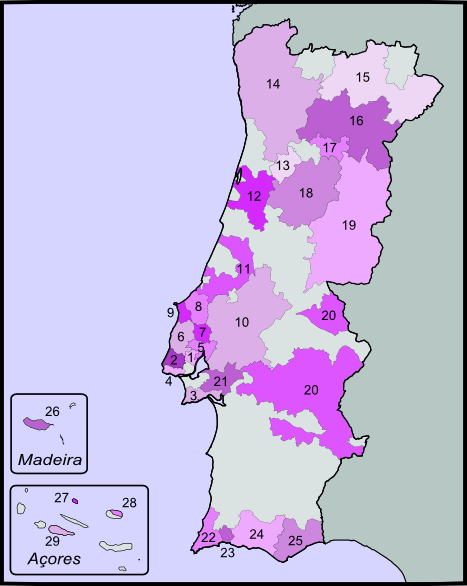
Map of the DOCs and IPRs of Portugal. Number 26 is Madeira, where Terras Madeirenses VR is also located.

Terras Madeirenses is a Portuguese wine region situated on the islands of Madeira, both on the main island and on the Porto Santo Island. The region is classified as a Vinho Regional (VR), which corresponds to table wines with a geographical indication under European Union wine regulations, similar to a French vin de pays region. Terras Madeirenses is a designation for simpler, non-fortified wines from Madeira, while the more famous fortified Madeira wines use the designation Madeira DOC.

== DOC regions ==
There are also two Denominação de Origem Controlada (DOCs), which correspond to a higher level of classification, covering the same area as Terras Madeirenses VR:

- Madeira DOC
- Madeirense DOC

== See also ==
- List of Portuguese wine regions
