= Madeira wine =

Fortified wine made in Madeira, Portugal

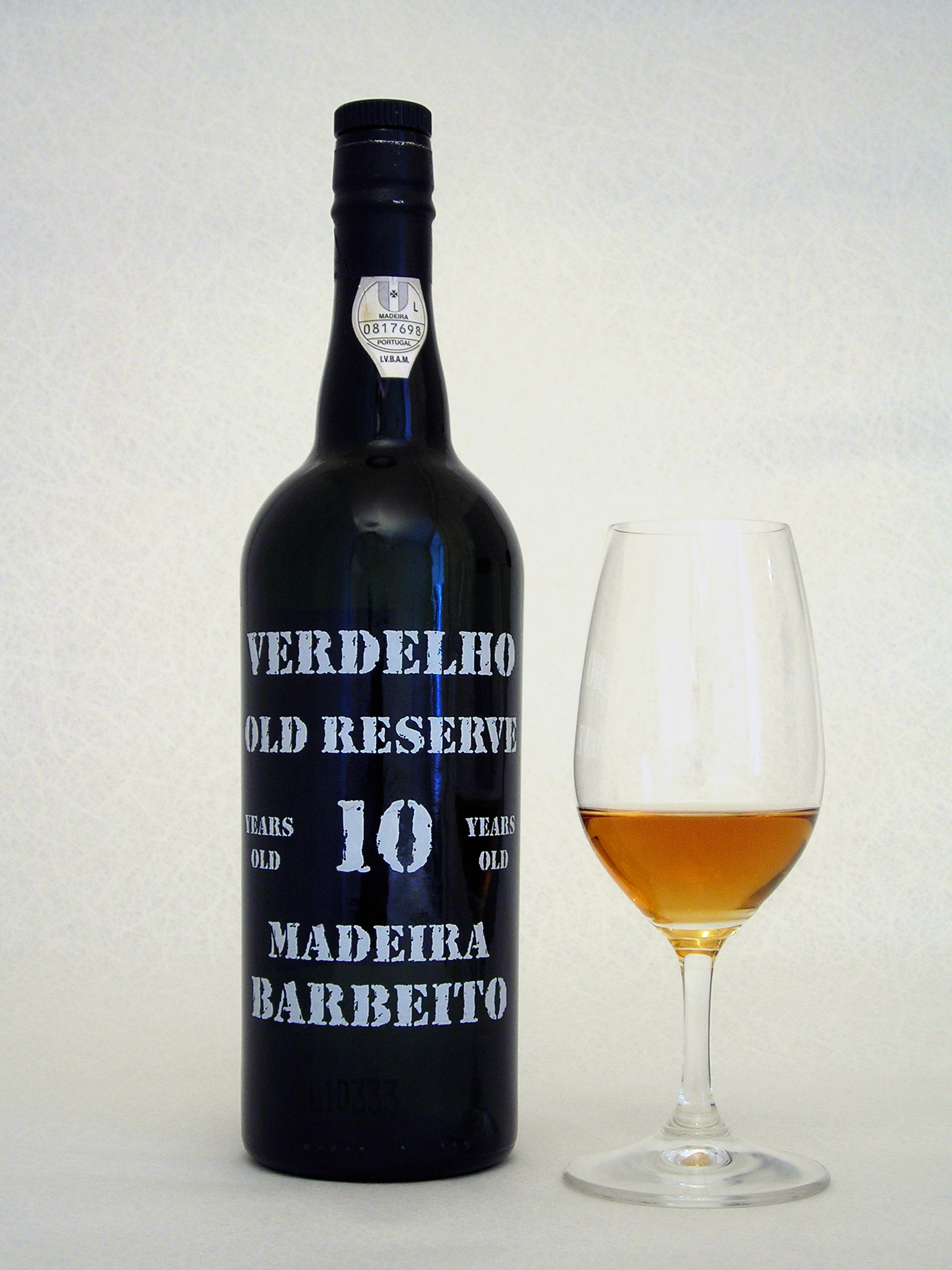
- Madeira wine

Madeira is a fortified wine made on the Portuguese island of Madeira, in the North Atlantic Ocean, just under 400 kilometres (250 mi) north of the Canary Islands, Spain and 520 kilometres (320 mi) west of Morocco. Madeira is produced in a variety of styles ranging from dry wines, which can be consumed on their own, as an apéritif, to sweet wines usually consumed with dessert. Lower-priced Madeira is also used for cooking; when intended for cooking and not drinking, it is often flavoured with salt and pepper.

The islands of Madeira have a long winemaking history, dating back to the Age of Exploration (approximately from the end of the 15th century), when Madeira was a standard port of call for ships heading to the New World or East Indies. To prevent the wine from spoiling, the local vintners began adding neutral grape spirits. On the long sea voyages, the wine would be exposed to excessive heat and movement, which benefited its flavour. This was discovered when an unsold shipment of wine was returned to the islands after a round trip.

Today, Madeira is noted for its winemaking process that involves oxidizing the wine through heat and ageing. The younger blends (three and five years old) are produced with the aid of artificial application of heat to accelerate the aging process; the older blends, colheitas and frasqueiras, are produced by the canteiro method. Because of the way these wines are aged, they are long-lived in the bottle, and those produced by the canteiro method will survive for decades and even centuries, even after being opened. Wines that have been in barrels for decades are often removed and stored in demijohns where they may remain unharmed indefinitely.

Some wines produced in small quantities in Crimea, California, and Texas are also referred to as "Madeira" or "Madera"; however, most countries conform to the EU PDO regulations and limit the use of the term Madeira or Madère to wines that come from the Madeira Islands.

== History of Madeira ==
=== Development and success (15th–18th centuries) ===
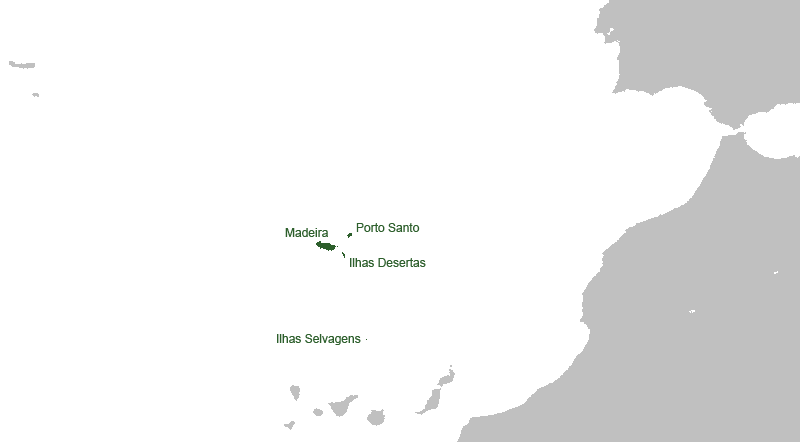
Madeira's location made it an ideal stopping location for voyages to the East Indies.

The roots of Madeira's wine industry date back to the Age of Exploration, when Madeira was a regular port of call for ships travelling to the East Indies. By the 16th century, records indicate that a well-established wine industry on the island supplied these ships with wine for the long voyages across the sea. The earliest examples of Madeira were unfortified and tended to spoil before reaching their destination. However, following the example of port, a small amount of distilled alcohol made from cane sugar was added to stabilize the wine by boosting the alcohol content. (The modern process of fortification using brandy did not become widespread until the 18th century.) The Dutch East India Company became a regular customer, picking up large, 423-litre (112 US gal) casks of wine known as "pipes" for their voyages to India.

The intense heat in the holds of the ships had a transforming effect on the wine, as discovered by Madeira producers when one shipment was returned to the island after a long trip. The customer was found to prefer the taste of this style of wine, and Madeira labeled as vinho da roda (wines that have made a round trip) became very popular. Madeira producers found that aging the wine on long sea voyages was very costly, so they began to develop methods on the island to produce the same aged and heated style. They began storing the wines on trestles at the winery or in special rooms known as estufas, where the heat of the island sun would age the wine.

With the increase of commercial treaties with England such as the Marriage Treaty in 1662, important English merchants settled on the island and, ultimately, controlled the increasingly important island wine trade. The English traders settled in the Funchal as of the seventeenth century, consolidating the markets from North America, the West Indies and England itself. Notable brands include Cossart and Gordon founded in 1745 and Blandy's in 1811.

The eighteenth century was the "golden age" for Madeira. The wine's popularity extended from the Thirteen Colonies and Brazil in the New World to Great Britain, Russia, and Northern Africa. The American colonies, in particular, were enthusiastic customers, consuming as much as 95% of all wine produced on the island each year.

=== Early American history (17th–18th centuries) ===
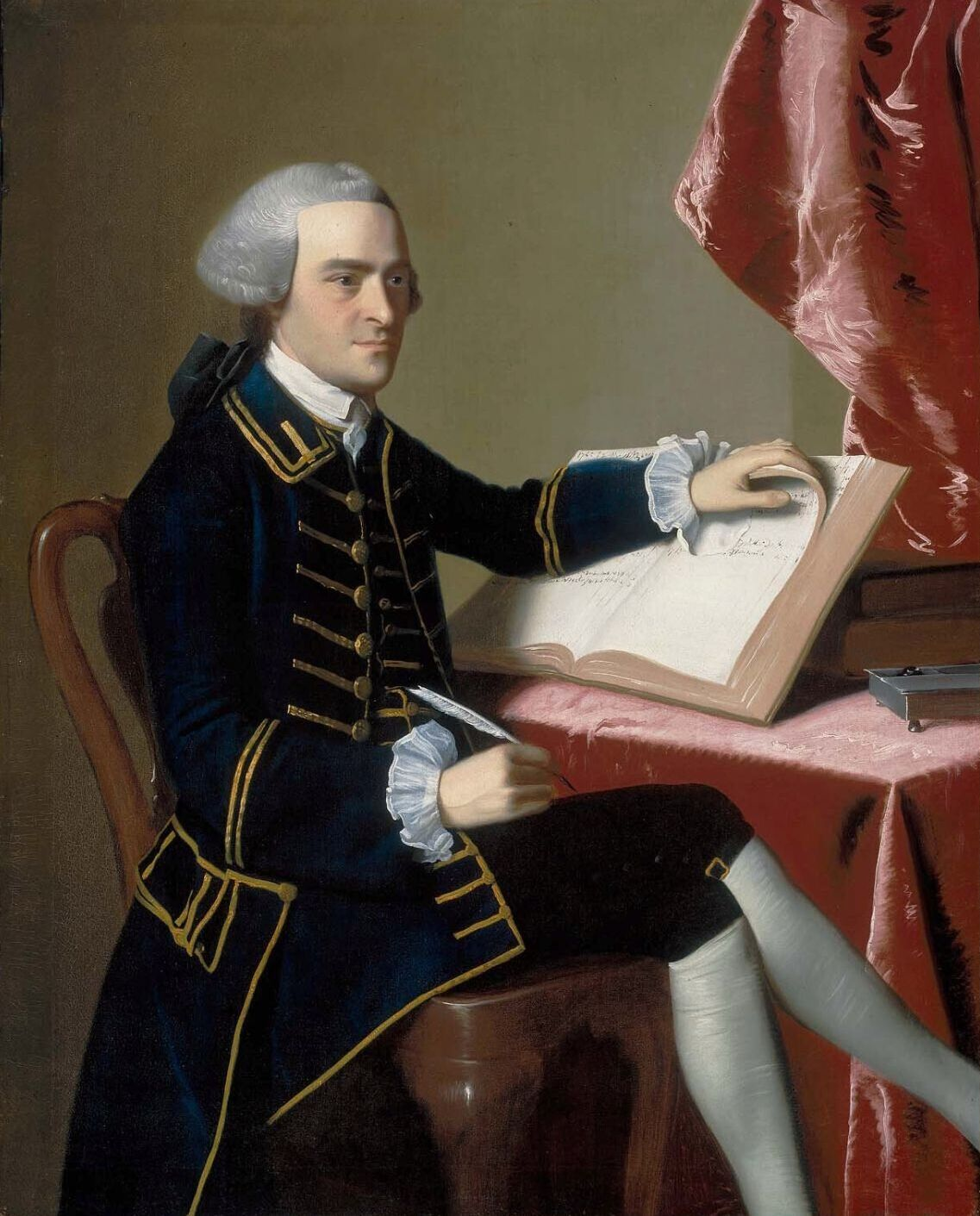
John Hancock, whose boat seizure after unloading a cargo of 25 pipes of Madeira caused riots in Boston.

Madeira was a very important wine in the history of the United States of America. No wine-quality grapes were grown among the thirteen colonies, so imports were needed, with a great focus on Madeira. One of the major events on the road to the American Revolution in which Madeira played a key role was the seizure of John Hancock's sloop Liberty by Boston customs officials on 9 May 1768. Hancock's boat was seized after he had unloaded a cargo of 25 pipes (3,150 US gallons (11,900 L)) of Madeira, and a dispute arose over import duties. The seizure of Liberty caused riots to erupt in Boston.

Madeira was a favorite of Thomas Jefferson, and it was used to toast the Declaration of Independence. George Washington, Alexander Hamilton, Benjamin Franklin and John Adams are also said to have appreciated the qualities of Madeira. The wine was mentioned in Benjamin Franklin's autobiography. On one occasion, Adams wrote to his wife, Abigail, of the great quantities of Madeira he consumed while a Massachusetts delegate to the Continental Congress. A bottle of Madeira was used by visiting Captain James Sever to christen USS Constitution in 1797. Chief Justice John Marshall was also known to appreciate Madeira, as were his cohorts on the early U.S. Supreme Court. Madeira and walnuts were often served together as a last course at dinner parties in Washington in the early decades of the 1800s.

=== Modern era (19th century – present) ===
The mid-19th century ushered an end to the industry's prosperity. First came the 1851 discovery of powdery mildew, which severely reduced production over the next three years. Just as the industry was recovering through the use of the copper-based Bordeaux mixture fungicide, the phylloxera epidemic that had plagued France and other European wine regions reached the island. By the end of the 19th century, most of the island's vineyards had been uprooted, and many were converted to sugar cane production. The majority of the vineyards that did replant chose to use American vine varieties, such as Vitis labrusca, Vitis riparia and Vitis rupestris or hybrid grape varieties rather than replant with the Vitis vinifera varieties that were previously grown.

By the turn of the 20th century, sales started to slowly return to normal, until the industry was rocked again by the Russian Civil War and American Prohibition, which closed off two of Madeira's biggest markets. After the repeal of Prohibition, improved shipping technology meant that ships no longer needed to stop off in Madeira, the island that was directly in the trade winds between Europe and America. The wine became known as The Forgotten Island Wine. The rest of the 20th century saw a downturn for Madeira, both in sales and reputation, as low-quality "cooking wine" became primarily associated with the island—much as it had for Marsala.

In 1988, the Symington family of Portugal invested in the Madeira Wine Company that owned many of the Madeira brand names. They asked Bartholomew Broadbent to re-launch Madeira and create a market for it again in America, which he did in 1989, establishing a firm rebirth of Madeira.

Towards the end of the 20th century, some producers started a renewed focus on quality—ripping out the hybrid and American vines and replanting with the "noble grape" varieties of Sercial, Verdelho, Terrantez, Bual and Malvasia. The "workhorse" varieties of Tinta Negra Mole now known officially as just Tinta Negra, and Complexa are still present and in high use, but hybrid grapes were officially banned from wine production in 1979. Today, Madeira's primary markets are in the Benelux countries, France (where seasoned cooking wine makes up the lion's share of imports), and Germany; emerging markets are growing in Japan, the United Kingdom, and the United States.

== Viticulture ==
=== Climate and geography ===
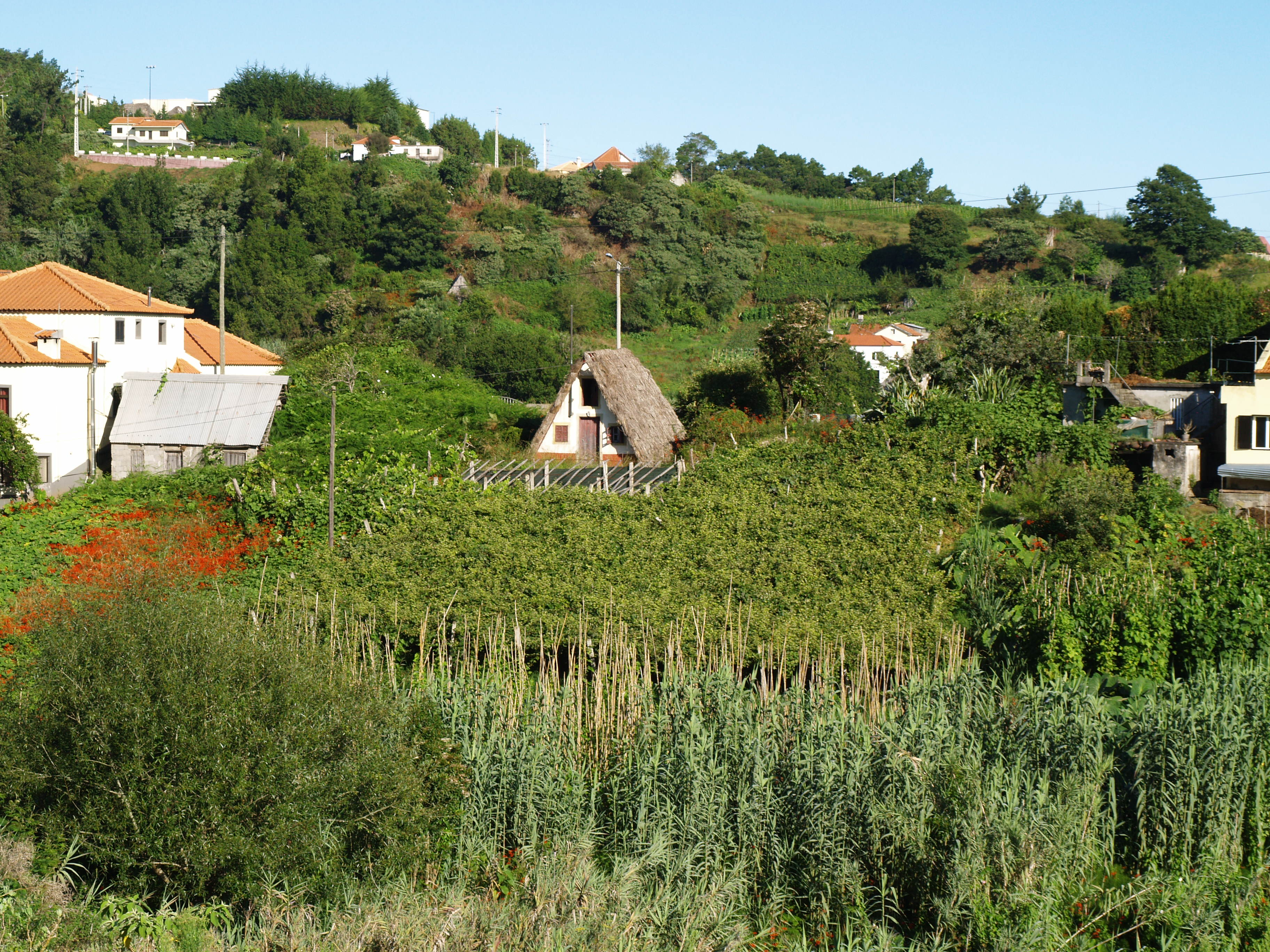
Vineyard growing among other cultures in the tropical influenced climate near Santana, Madeira.

The island of Madeira has an oceanic climate with some tropical influences. With high rainfall and average mean temperature of 66 °F (19 °C), the threats of fungal grape diseases and botrytis rot are constant viticultural hazards. To combat these threats, Madeira vineyards are often planted on low trellises, known as latada, that raise the canopy of the vine off the ground similar to a style used in the Vinho Verde region of Portugal. The terrain of the mountainous volcanic island is difficult to cultivate, so vineyards are planted on man-made terraces of red and brown basaltic bedrock. These terraces, known as poios, are very similar to the terraces of the Douro that make Port wine production possible. The use of mechanical harvesting and vineyard equipment is near impossible, making wine grape growing a costly endeavor on the island. Many vineyards have in the past been ripped up for commercial tourist developments or replanted with such products as bananas for commercial concerns. Producers remain concerned about vineyard loss due to climate change, tourism pressure, and the shrinking area under vine on Madeira. Some replanting is taking place on the island; however, the tourist trade is generally seen as a more lucrative business than wine-making. Most of the grapes, grown by around 2100 grape growers are from vines planted on small plots of land from which the grape growers survive by making an income from a variety of different inter-grown crops.

=== Grape varieties ===
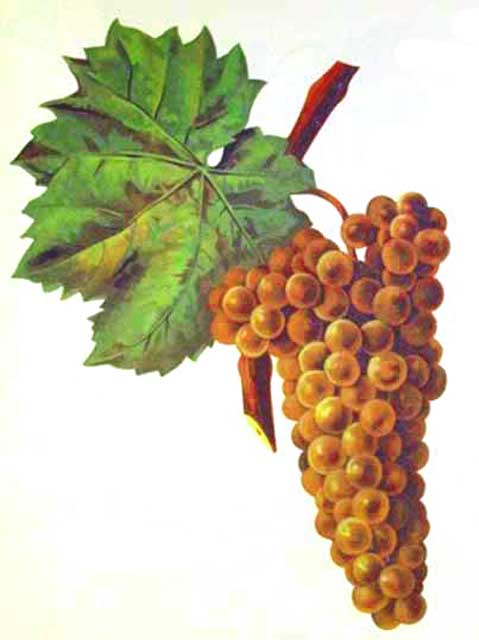
Malvasia (also known as Malmsey or Malvazia) grape variety.

Tinta Negra (also known as Negra Mole) is widely described as Madeira’s dominant red grape and the base of much of the island’s production. Approximately 85% of Madeira is produced with the red grape, Negra Mole. The four major white grape varieties used for Madeira production are (from sweetest to driest) Malvasia, Bual, Verdelho, and Sercial. These varieties also lend their names to Madeira labelling, as discussed below. Occasionally one sees Terrantez, Bastardo and Moscatel varieties, although these are now rare on the island because of oidium and phylloxera. Modern reporting highlights Terrantez’s revival from near extinction, with official support intended to increase plantings and preserve the grape on Madeira. Since 2016, to encourage more growers to plant Terrantez, Madeira's fifth noble grape variety, the government Wine, Embroidery and Handicraft Institute of Madeira (IVBAM) has offered growers free viticultural advice and a €1.30 subsidy per kilogram of Terrantez fruit harvested. As of 2016, Terrantez production stood at 7,500 kg (16,500 lb). After the phylloxera epidemic, many wines were "mislabelled" as containing one of these noble grape varieties, which were reinterpreted as "wine styles" rather than true varietal names. Regulations enacted in 1986 by the European Union introduced the rule that 85% of the grapes in the wine must be of the variety on the label; in 2015, Tinta Negra was elevated to a Recommended varietal and may now also be listed on the label, often alongside a style description such as "Medium-Rich". Thus, wines from before the late 19th century (pre-phylloxera) and after the late 20th century conform to this rule, whereas many "varietally labelled" Madeiras from most of the 20th century do not. Tinta Negra is increasingly treated as Madeira’s workhorse grape and is also capable of producing age-worthy wines. Reviews also describe Tinta Negra as a versatile grape producing Madeira in multiple sweetness levels and offering a higher quality than older summaries imply. Bastardo, Complexa, and Tinta Negra are red grape varieties.

Grown exclusively on the neighboring island of Porto Santo, which is also permitted under the appellation law to provide grapes for Madeira wine, are the varieties Listrão (Palomino Fino) and Caracol. Listrão Madeira was formerly made by a few companies such as Blandy's and Artur de Barros e Sousa, the latter being the last old producer to utilize the variety when they closed their doors in 2013, but Madeira Vintners founded in that year subsequently restarted production of, and released in 2020, a 5-year-old Listrão Reserve Madeira. Caracol, an obscure grape believed to be unique to Porto Santo and only used for the local production of dry table wine in the past, was turned into fortified Madeira for the first time by Madeira Vintners, becoming the first new grape in over a century to be used for high-quality single-varietal Madeira wine. The company's stocks are still aging as of 2025 and no wine is on the market yet.

Other varieties planted on the island, though not legally permitted for Madeira production, include Arnsburger, Cabernet Sauvignon, and the American hybrids Cunningham and Jacquet. The latter two grapes, formerly used for Madeira production in the post-phylloxera years, were supposed to have been grubbed up altogether under EU law, although in practice some farmers have kept a few vines to make table wine for their own consumption.

=== Winemaking ===
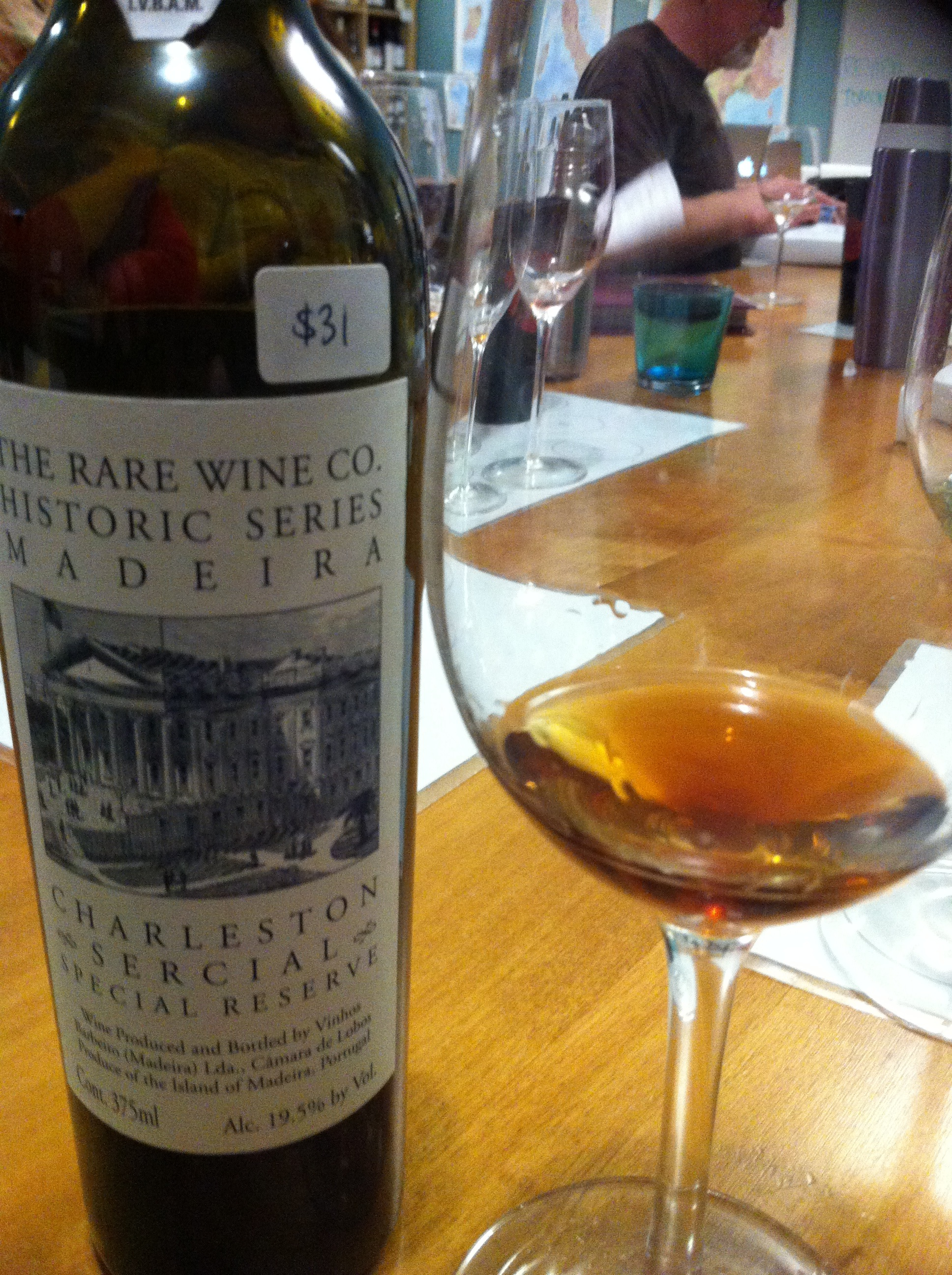
A dry Madeira made from the Sercial grape.

The initial winemaking steps of Madeira start out like most other wines: grapes are harvested, crushed, pressed, and then fermented in either stainless steel or oak casks. The grape varieties destined for sweeter wines – Bual and Malvasia – are often fermented on their skins to leach more phenols from the grapes to balance the sweetness of the wine. Drier wines – made from Sercial, Verdelho, and Negra Mole – are separated from their skins prior to fermentation. Depending on the level of sweetness desired, fermentation of the wine is halted at some point by the addition of neutral grape spirits.

Younger wines (typically 3 and 5 years old) undergo the estufagem aging process to produce Madeira's distinctive flavor by artificial heating, whereas the wines destined for long aging are barrel-aged using only the naturally high temperatures of the barrel storage rooms (see canteiro process).

Colourings such as caramel colouring have been used in the past to give some consistency (see also Whiskey), although this practice is decreasing.

=== Aging process ===
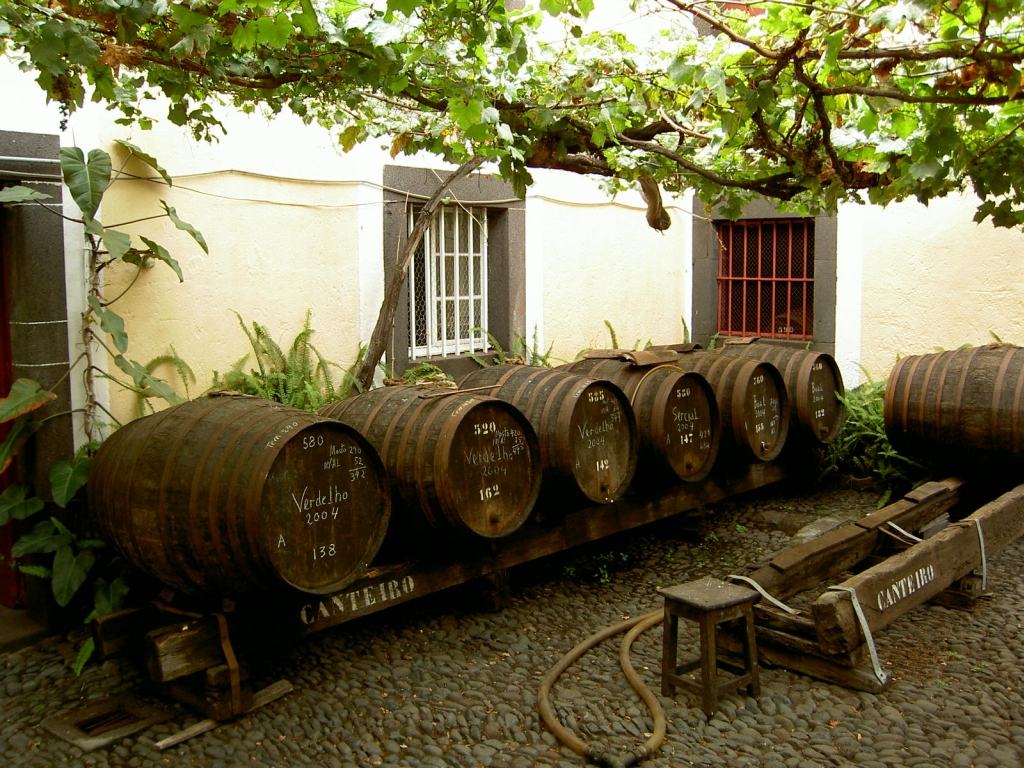
Barrels of wine aging in the sun: the unique aging process of Madeira wine in which heat and temperature helped protect the wine for long sea voyages through tropical climates.

What makes Madeira wine production unique is how the wines are aged in relatively high temperatures, meant to duplicate the effect of a long sea voyage on the aging barrels through tropical climates. Three main methods are used to heat the wine during aging. Two of the three methods belong to the estufagem process (estufa means hothouse or stove in Portuguese), in which artificial heat is used to accelerate the aging process of the wines, whereas the canteiro process is used for the older and more expensive wines and employs only the natural heat of the barrel warehouses. Estufagem is mainly associated with younger, less expensive Madeira, while the best wines are aged in cask by the slower canteiro method for many years or decades.

Estufagem processes:

- Armazém de Calor (heat-cycled rickhouses): Only used by the Madeira Wine Company, this method involves storing the wine in large wooden casks in a specially designed room outfitted with steam-producing tanks or pipes that heat the room, creating a type of sauna. This process more gently exposes the wine to heat and can last from six months to over a year.
- Cuba de Calor (heated tanks): The most common, used for low-cost Madeira, is bulk aging in low stainless steel or concrete tanks surrounded by either heat coils or piping that allow hot water to circulate around the container. The wine is heated to temperatures as high as 130 °F (55 °C) for a minimum of 90 days as regulated by the Madeira Wine Institute. However, the Madeira is most commonly heated to approximately 115 °F (46 °C)

Barrel-aging process:

- Canteiro (loft aging): Used for the highest quality Madeiras, these wines are aged without the use of any artificial heat, being stored by the winery in warm rooms that are heated only by the warm climate of the Madeira island. Colheita Madeiras are aged for at least five years in this manner, whereas for Frasqueira (vintage) Madeira, this heating process can last anywhere from 20 years to over 200 years in exceptional cases such as the 1795 Barbeito Terrantez. The term Canteiro comes from canteiros – the wooden staves that keep the barrels in their places. Canteiro process is used by all of the top Madeira brands, including Blandy's, Borges, Broadbent, d'Oliveiras and Justino's.

Much of the characteristic flavour of Madeira is due to this practice, which hastens the mellowing of the wine and also tends to check secondary fermentation in as much as it is, in effect, a mild kind of pasteurization. Furthermore, the wine is deliberately exposed to air, causing it to oxidize. The resulting wine has a colour similar to a tawny port wine. Wine tasters sometimes describe a wine that has been exposed to excessive heat during its storage as being cooked or maderized.

== Styles ==
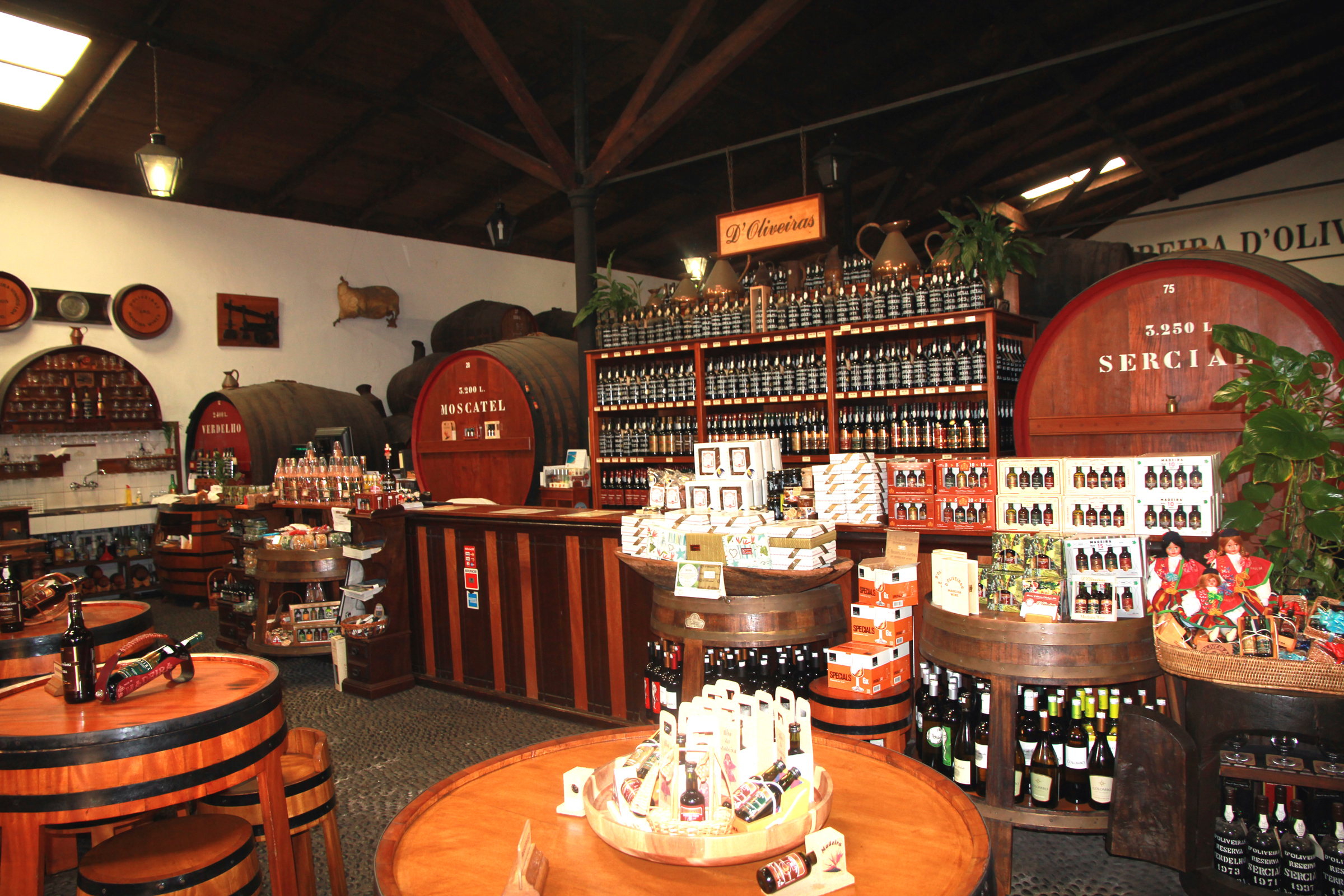
Company Pereira D`Oliveiras, Funchal

=== Noble varieties ===
The four major styles of Madeira are synonymous with the names of the four best-known white grapes used to produce the wine. Ranging from the sweetest style to the driest style, the Madeira types are:

- Malvasia (also known as Malvazia or Malmsey) has its fermentation halted when its sugars are between 3.5 and 6.5° Baumé (63–117 g/L). This style of wine is characterised by its dark colour, rich texture, and coffee-caramel flavours. Like other Madeiras made from noble grape varieties, the Malvasia grape used in Malmsey production has naturally high levels of acidity in the wine, which balances with the high sugar levels so the wines do not taste cloyingly sweet.
- Bual (also called Boal, or Malvasia Candida) has its fermentation halted when its sugars are between 2.5 and 3.5° Baumé (45–63 g/L). This style of wine is characterized by its dark colour, medium-rich texture, and raisin flavours.
- Verdelho has its fermentation halted a little later than Sercial, when its sugars are between 1.5 and 2.5° Baumé (27–45 g/L). This style of wine is characterized by smokey notes and high acidity.
- Sercial is nearly fermented completely dry, with very little residual sugar (0.5 to 1.5° on the Baumé scale, or 9–27 g/L). This style of wine is characterised by high-toned colours, almond flavours, and high acidity.

A fifth noble grape, Terrantez, underwent a documented revival after nearing extinction, helped by subsidy and replanting efforts intended to increase plantings on the island. Its style ranges in sweetness from that of Verdelho to that of Bual, never being quite as dry as Sercial nor quite as sweet as Malvasia.

Alongside these varieties, Tinta Negra bottlings are treated as an important part of the Madeira red grape category.

=== Other labelling ===
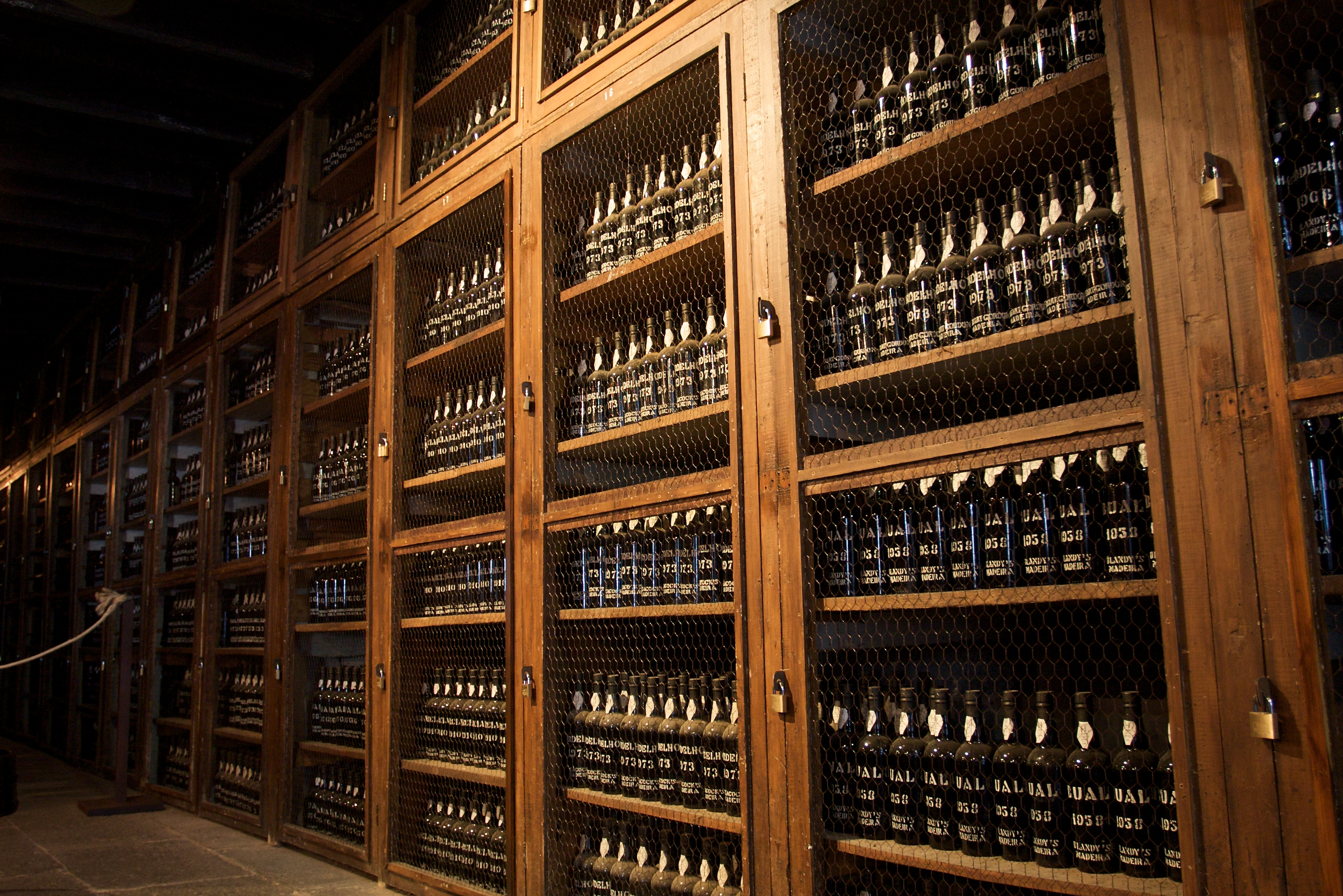
Storage of vintage Madeira wine, Blandys Winery, Funchal

Wines made from at least 85% of the noble varieties of Sercial, Verdelho, Bual, and Malvasia are usually labelled based on the amount of time they were aged:

- Colheita or Harvest – This style includes wines from a single vintage, but aged for a shorter period than true Frasqueira Vintage Madeira. The wine can be labelled with a vintage date but includes the word colheita on it. Colheita must be a minimum of five years of age before being bottled and may be bottled any time after that. Effectively, most wineries would drop the word Colheita once bottling a wine at over 19 years of age because it is entitled to be referred to as vintage once it is 20 years of age. At that point, the wine can command a higher price than if it were still to be bottled as Colheita. This differs from Colheita Port, which is a minimum of seven years of age before bottling.
- Wines labeled Fine or Finest, or without any indication of age, have been aged for at least three years and are the most common wines used in cooking.
- Reserve (five years) – This is the minimum amount of aging a wine labelled with one of the noble varieties are permitted to have.
- Special Reserve (10 years) – At this point, the wines are often aged naturally without any artificial heat source.
- Extra Reserve (over 15 years) – This style is rare to produce, with many producers extending the aging to 20 years for a vintage or producing a colheita. It is richer in style than a Special Reserve Madeira.
- Vintage or Frasqueira – This style must be aged at least 19 years in a cask and one year in bottle, therefore cannot be sold until it is at least 20 years of age. The word vintage does not appear on bottles of vintage Madeira because, in Portugal, the word "Vintage" is a trademark belonging to the Port traders.

The terms pale, dark, full, and rich can also be included to describe the wine's colour.

Madeira produced from Negra Mole grapes used to be legally restricted to use generic terms on the label to indicate the level of sweetness as seco (dry), meio seco (medium dry), meio doce (medium sweet) and doce (sweet). However, in 2015 the Madeira Wine Institute announced that producers may officially recognise Tinta Negra on their front labels and that all "expressions" must state their bottling date.

Wines listed with Solera were made in a style similar to sherry, with a fractional blending of wines from different vintages in a solera system. The Solera method of blending is most widely practiced in the sherry production of Spain. Initially, the rules for Madeira soleras were different, with a maximum of ten percent of the wine in the solera being permitted to be drawn off and replaced each year, and the process repeated a maximum of ten times before the solera had to be completely emptied; as such a significant proportion of wine in any bottle would be from the listed year. However, at some unknown time, laws were loosened to allow soleras to be used indefinitely as they are in Sherry production, resulting in some later and less expensive Solera wines containing microscopic quantities of the listed old vintage. Another interesting peculiarity of old solera Madeiras is that they were initially developed as a result of trying to extend the stocks of vintages when the vines had stopped being productive due to Phylloxera. Therefore, as there was no younger wine to add to the vintage, it was usually older wines that were added. In recent years, vintage Madeiras have been commanding higher prices than soleras, but, from 1966 (when Michael Broadbent started wine auctions at Christie's), until about the end of the 20th century, solera Madeiras always fetched a premium at auction over the vintage ones.

=== Rainwater ===
A style commonly described in modern wine writing called "Rainwater" is a dry-to-medium-dry style of Madeira drunk as an apéritif. Nowadays Rainwater is most often a lighter, dry-to-medium-dry Madeira style, made entirely from Tinta Negra grapes, and aged for around three years including a period in an estufa, though some producers continue to make higher-quality Rainwater versions using traditional grape varieties such as Sercial and Verdelho grapes.

Accounts conflict as to how this style was developed and named. The most common one is that the grapes used for the style were (and in some cases still are) preferentially sourced from São Vicente and other rain-watered wine regions on the wetter north slope of the island, rather than the irrigated vineyards of the southern side. Another involves a shipment destined for the American colonies that was accidentally diluted by rainwater while it sat on the docks in Savannah, Georgia, or Funchal. Rather than dump the wines, the merchants tried to pass it off as a "new style" of Madeira and were surprised at its popularity among the Americans. Another story relates that a gentleman in Savannah, Georgia tasted such a Madeira and declared, "This is as fine as Rainwater."

=== Other styles ===
"Quinado-Madeira", a tonic wine dosed with quinine consumed to ward off malaria in tropical regions, and "White Madeira", a lighter style of wine heavily chill-filtered to remove colouring and flavor compounds, were both discontinued at some time in the 20th century.

== Characteristics ==
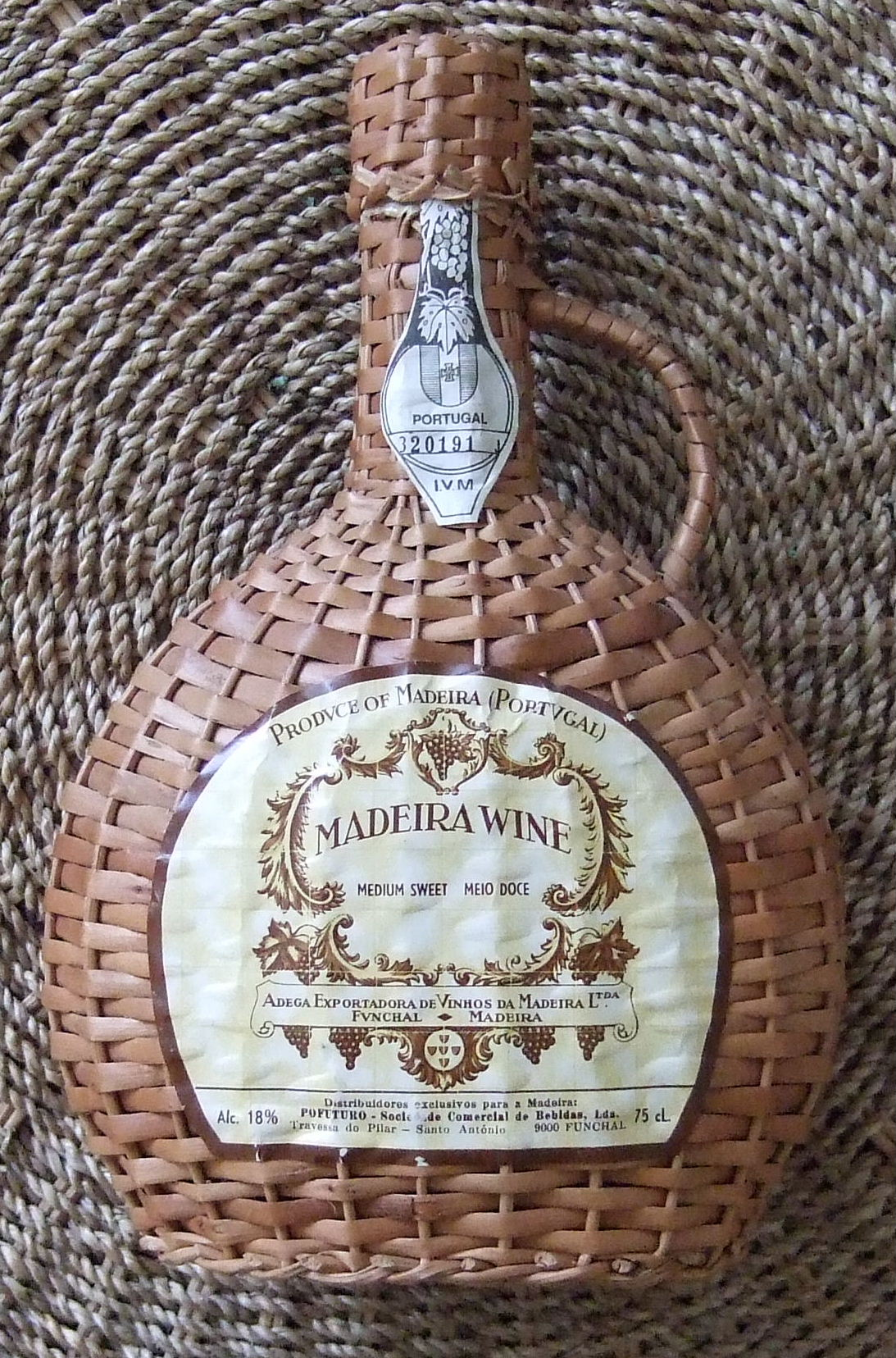
A bottle of Madeira wine in a traditional wicker cask.

Exposure to extreme temperature and oxygen accounts for Madeira's stability; due to its oxidative, heat-aged production, Madeira is exceptionally durable after opening, with good examples remaining sound for months or longer. As long as a cork is put into the top of the bottle to prevent the effects of evaporation, fruit flies, and dust, a vintage Madeira, once opened, can last for decades. Properly sealed in bottles, it is one of the longest-lasting wines; Madeiras have been known to survive over 200 years in excellent condition. It is not uncommon to see 150-year-old Madeiras for sale at stores that specialize in rare wine. Vintages dating back to 1780 are known to exist. The oldest bottle that has come onto the market is a 1715 Terrantez.

Before the advent of artificial refrigeration, Madeira wine was particularly prized in areas where it was impractical to construct wine cellars (as in parts of the southern United States) because, unlike many other fine wines, it could survive being stored over hot summers without significant damage. In the Americas, Madeira was traditionally stored in the warm attics of houses.

== Collecting and investment ==
The investment market for Madeira wine is driven by its exceptional longevity and stability, with rare vintage bottles commanding significant premiums at major auction houses such as Christie's and Sotheby's. Because the wine is fortified and subjected to forced oxidation during production, it remains virtually indestructible, allowing bottles from the 18th and 19th centuries to remain drinkable and investable for over 200 years.

Madeira's extreme longevity has established it as a distinct category within the fine wine market. According to the Madeira Wine Index developed by Rare Wine Indices, this collectible status is reflected in long-term appreciation, with the index reporting a compounded annual growth rate of over 6% across a period exceeding two decades.

Notable auction results include a bottle of 1715 JCA & C Terrantez which sold for $39,000 at Christie's in 2016, and a bottle of 1792 Blandy's which realized £25,000 in 2022. Auction prices frequently exceed pre-sale estimates due to the scarcity of pre-phylloxera vintages, as evidenced by a 2018 sale where bottles of 1798 Lenox Madeira sold for $15,925, nearly double their high estimate.

== Uses ==
Popular uses include apéritifs (pre-meal) and digestifs (post-meal). In Britain it has traditionally been associated with Madeira cake.

Madeira is also used as a flavouring agent in cooking. Lower-quality Madeira wines may be flavored with salt and pepper to prevent their sale as Madeira wine, and then exported for cooking purposes. Madeira wine is commonly used in tournedos Rossini and sauce madère (Madeira sauce). Unflavored Madeira may also be used in cooking, such as the dessert dish "Plum in madeira".

== Intangible Cultural Heritage ==
The 11 September 2024, the University of Madeira announced the intention to lead the drafting of an application of the Madeira wine traditions to the Representative List of Intangible Cultural Heritage of Humanity (official announcement here).

== See also ==
- Have Some Madeira M'Dear
- History of Portuguese wine
- List of Portuguese wine regions
- Marsala wine
- Port wine
- Sherry
- Terras Madeirenses VR, a Vinho Regional designation for simpler, non-fortified wines from Madeira
