= Graciosa IPR =

Portuguese Wine Region

Graciosa is a Portuguese wine region centered on the island of Graciosa in the Azores. The region has the second tier Indicação de Proveniencia Regulamentada (IPR) classification and may some day be promoted to Denominação de Origem Controlada (DOC). The region is known for its light bodied table wines.

== Grapes ==
The principle grapes of the Graciosa region include Arinto, Fernão Pires, Terrantez and Verdelho.

== See also ==
- List of Portuguese wine regions
- Açores VR
