= Biscoitos IPR =

Portuguese Wine Region

Biscoitos is a Portuguese wine region located on the Terceira island of the Azores. The region has the second tier Indicação de Proveniencia Regulamentada (IPR) classification and maybe some day promoted to Denominação de Origem Controlada (DOC). The production of the region is primarily fortified wines.

== Grapes ==
The principle grapes of the Biscoitos region include Arinto, Terrantez and Verdelho.

== See also ==
- List of Portuguese wine regions
- Açores VR
