= Sercial =

Variety of grape

- Grape (Vitis)
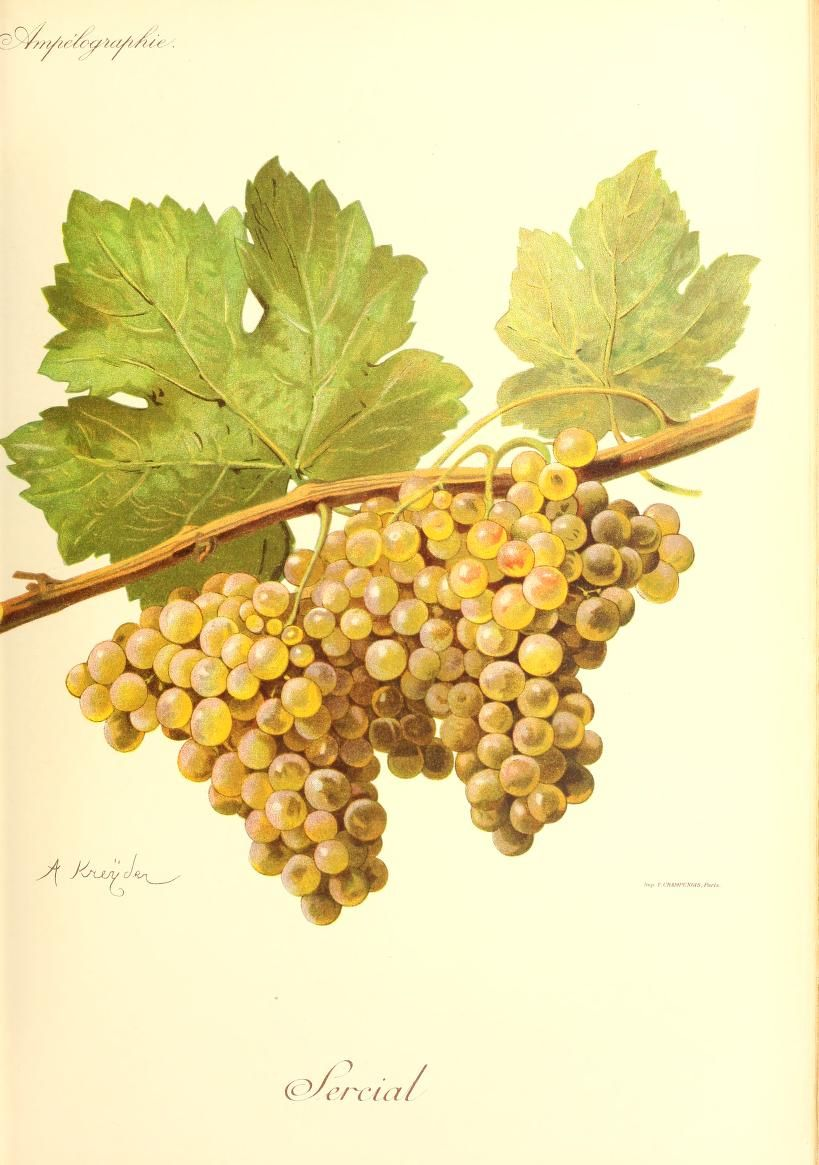
- Sercial in Viala & Vermorel
- Color of berry skin: Blanc
- Species: Vitis vinifera
- Origin: Portugal
- VIVC number: 11497

Sercial is the name of a white grape grown in Portugal, especially on the island of Madeira. It has given its name to the driest of the four classic varieties of Madeira fortified wine.

The grape is grown in diminishing quantities at the southern end of the island. After phylloxera devastated Madeira's vineyards, the grape became more common on the mainland, where it is known as esgana or esgana cão, meaning respectively strangler or dog strangler. Its late ripening allows it to retain its characteristic acidity.

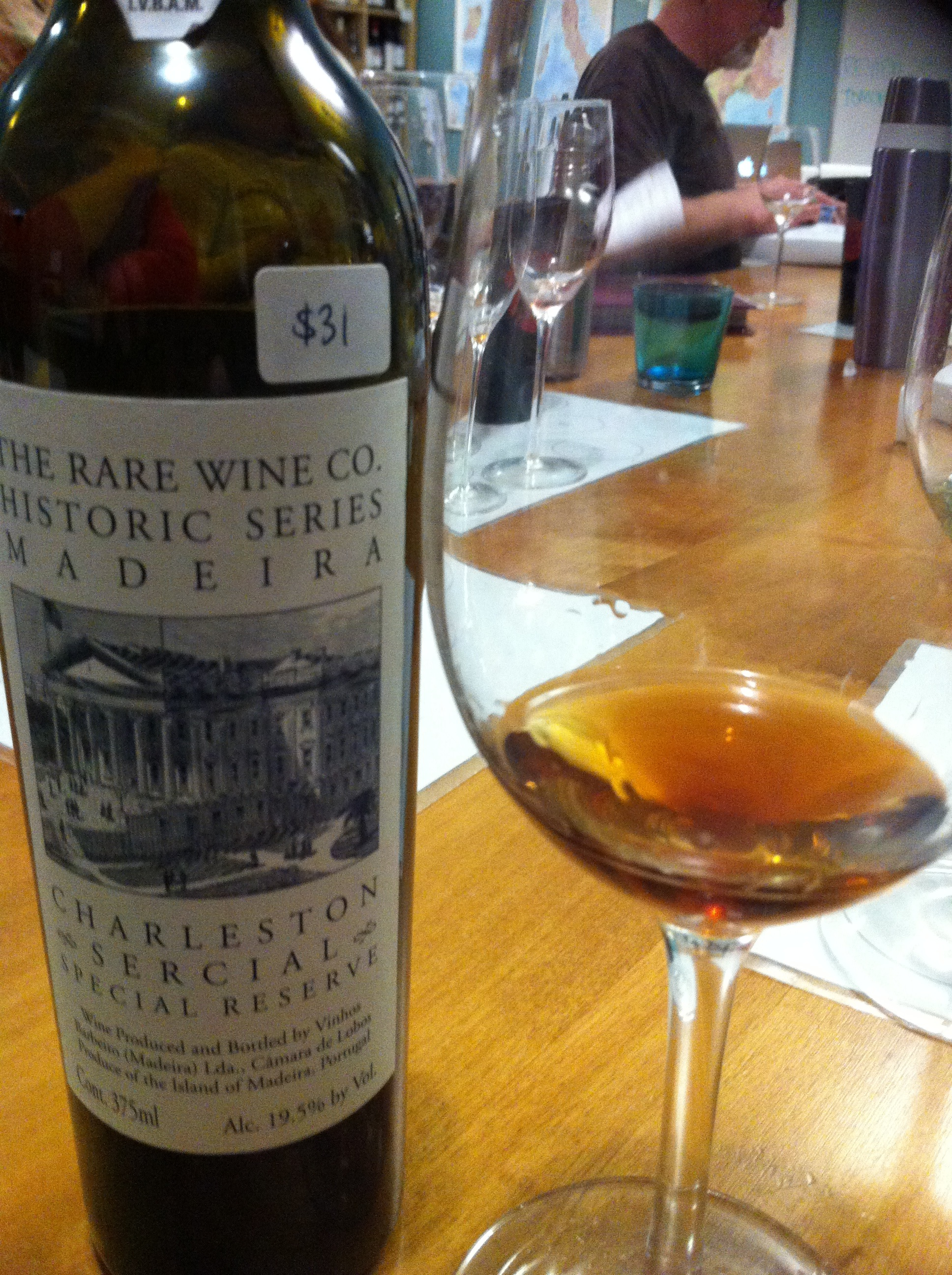
Madeira made from the Sercial grape.

The anglicised name Sercial came to be associated with the Madeira style rather than the grape variety, being the lightest, most acidic and delicate expression of Madeira that takes the longest to mature. European Union rules for varietal names on wine labels require Madeiras labelled Sercial to be made from a minimum of 85% Sercial.

For unknown reasons, Sercial was the name given to the Gascony grape Ondenc when it was planted in Australia.

== See also ==
- List of Portuguese grape varieties
