= Madalena =

Madalena is a feminine given name. It is a Portuguese form of Magdalene. It may refer to:

== Films ==
- Madalena (1960 film), a Greek film
- Madalena (2021 film), a Brazilian film

== People ==
- Madalena Alberto, Portuguese actress, singer and composer
- Madalena Boavida, East Timorese politician
- Maddalena Casulana, (c. 1544–c. 1590), Italian composer, lutenist and singer
- Madalena Iglésias, (1939–2018), Portuguese actress and singer
- Madalena dos Santos Reinbolt, (1919–1977), Brazilian painter and textile artist

== Places ==
- Madalena, Brazil, in the State of Ceará, Brazil
- Madalena (Lisbon), a civil parish in Lisbon, Portugal
- Madalena (Tomar), a civil parish in Tomar, Portugal
- Madalena, Vila Nova de Gaia, a civil parish in Vila Nova de Gaia, Portugal
- Madalena (Azores), a municipality along the western coast of Pico, Portuguese Azores
- Madalena (Madalena), a civil parish along the western coast of Pico, Portuguese Azores
- Madalena do Mar, a civil parish in Machico, Portuguese Madeira
- Madliena, part of Swieqi, Malta

== See also ==
- Magdalene (given name)
- Magdalena (given name)
- Madeline (name)
- Madeleine (name)
