= São Mateus (Madalena) =

- Civil parish
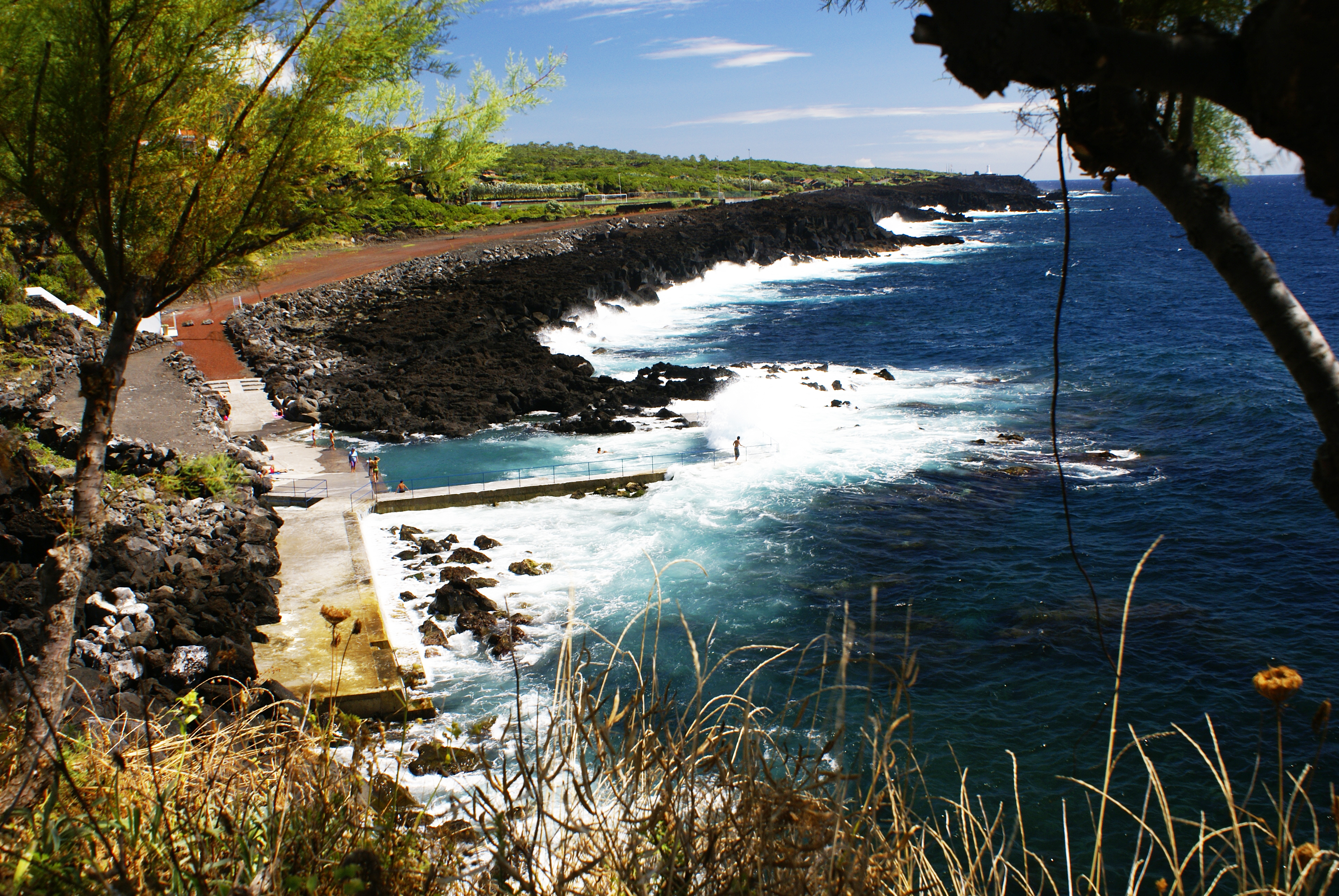
- The old fishing port of São Mateus, with view to São Caetano, on the island of Pico

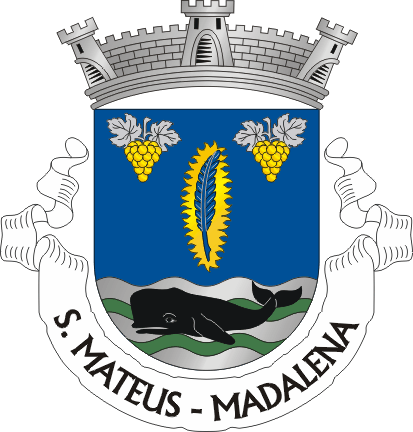
- Coat of arms

- Coordinates: 38°26′1″N 28°27′18″W
- Country: Portugal
- Auton. region: Azores
- Island: Pico
- Municipality: Madalena

Area
  - Total: 17.37 km^{2} (6.71 sq mi)
- Elevation: 75 m (246 ft)

Population (2011)
  - Total: 772
  - Density: 44.4/km^{2} (115/sq mi)
- Time zone: UTC−01:00 (AZOT)
  - Summer (DST): UTC+00:00 (AZOST)
- Postal code: 9950-521
- Area code: 292
- Patron: São Mateus

São Mateus (Portuguese for 'Saint Matthew') (pronounced [sɐ̃w mɐ.ˈte.uʃ]) is a civil parish along the southwestern coast of the municipality of Madalena on the island Portuguese island of Pico, in the archipelago of the Azores. The population in 2011 was 772, in an area of 17.37 km².

== History ==
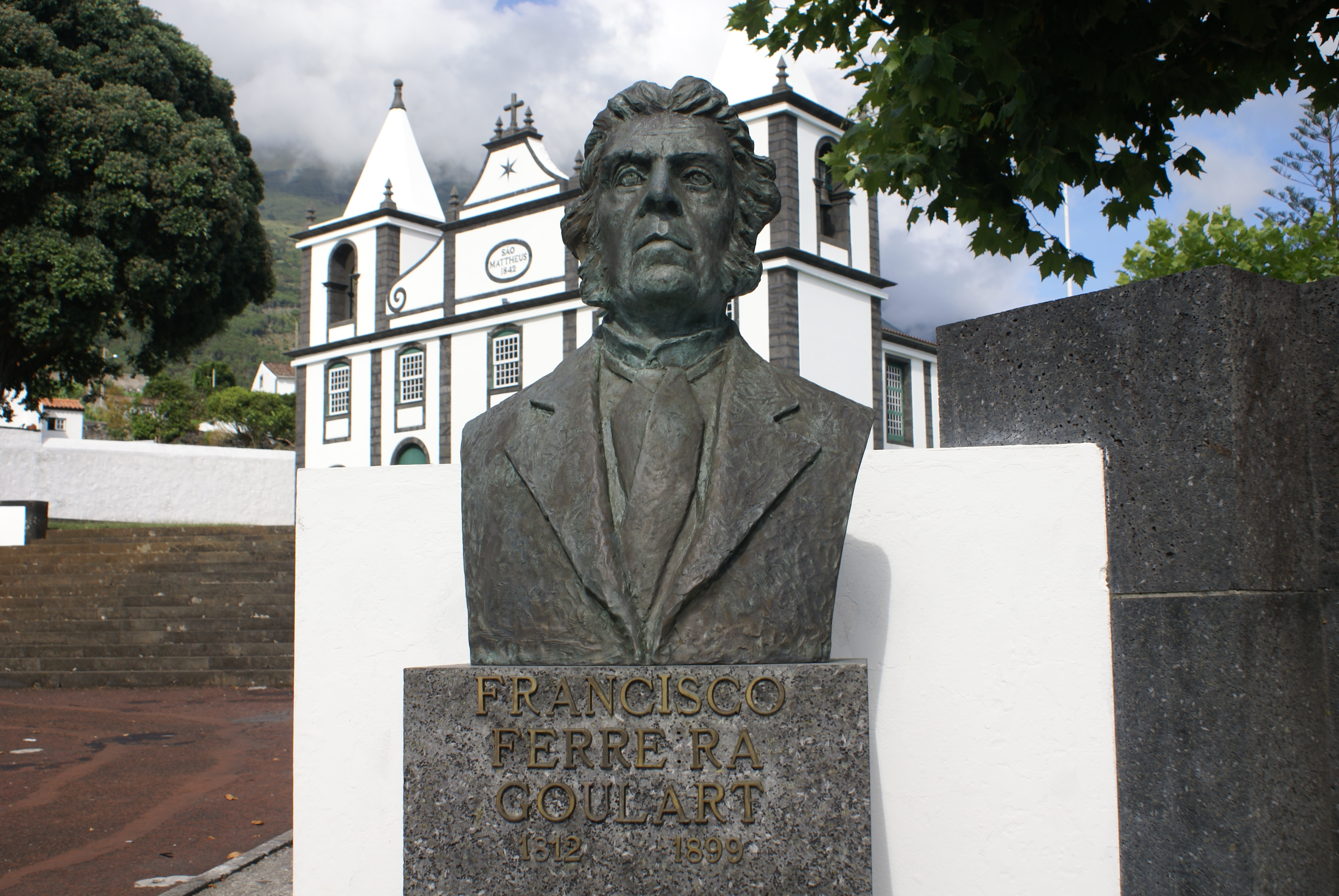
A bust of Francisco Ferreira Goulart, resident and patron of the small parish

It is known, from oral investigations, that one of the first civil parishes created on the island of Pico was dedicated to the apostle Mathew, and which extended along the southern coast in an area considerably larger than today's limits. It was, then, part of the locality of Arruda, its centre 12 kilometres (7.5 mi) from Lajes, and whose name was derived from a medicinal plant discovered in the region.

== Geography ==
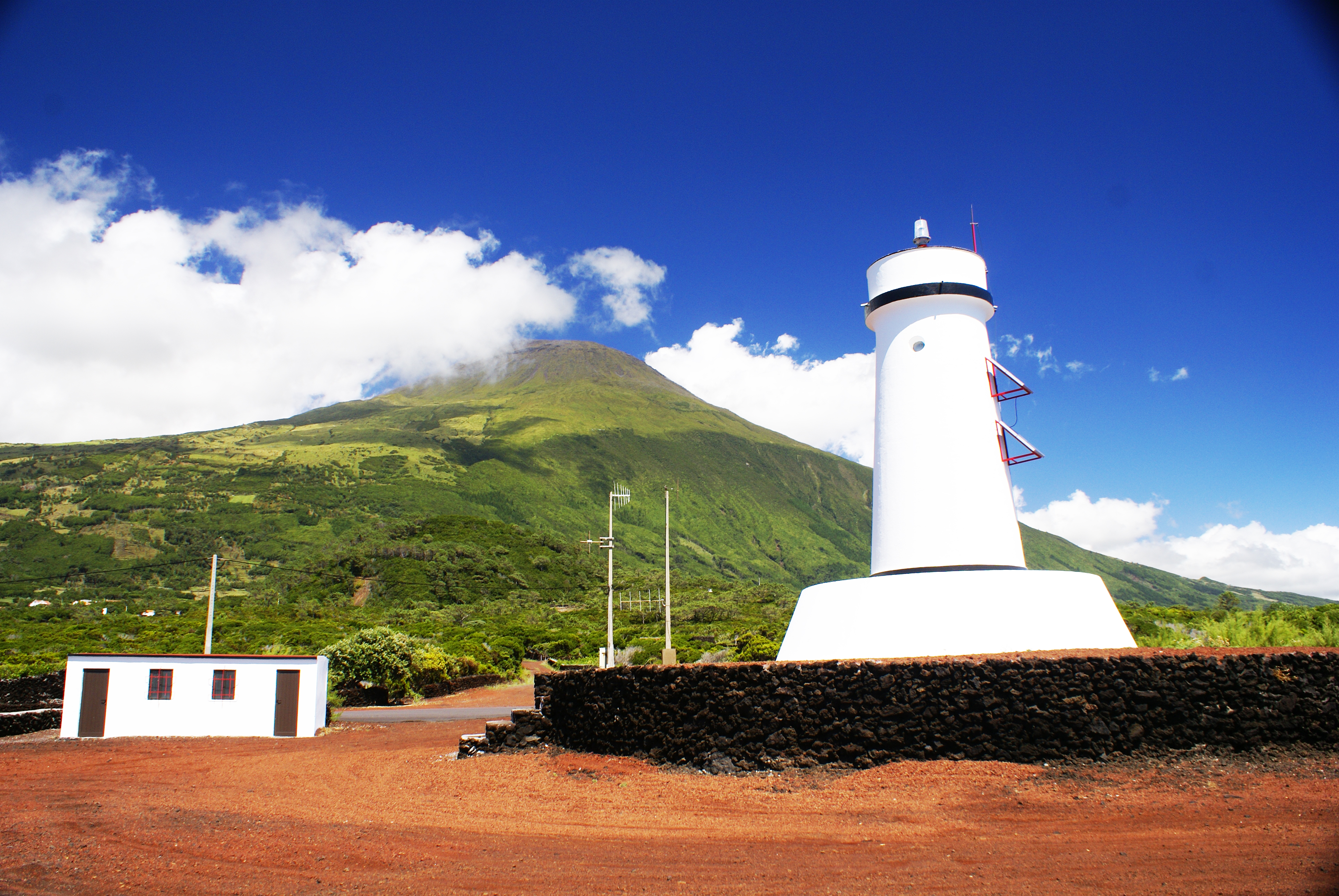
The lighthouse of Ponta de São Mateus and view of Mount Pico

Connected to the two principal centers (Madalena on the west coast and Lajes on the south coast) by the Regional E.R.1-1ª roadway, the parish is wedged between the parishes of São Caetano and Candelária. The pie-shaped parish extends from the southern coast to the interior, sloping from rugged cliffs to the mountainous summit of Ponta do Pico. While farmlands and settlements occupy most of the areas along the roadways, the dense forest occupies the majority of its territory.

In addition to the parish center of São Mateus (location of the primary school, commercial businesses and civil government), located near the São Caetano border, the coastal village of Areeiro in the southwest corner and the interior hamlet of Ginjeira, are the predominant rural agglomerations. Other localities are Badgaço, Canada Nova, Grotas, Grotas de Cima, Mata, Paço, Ponta da Calheta, Porto Novo, Porto de São Mateus, Pontinha, Relvas and Rua dos Caldeirões.

== Architecture ==
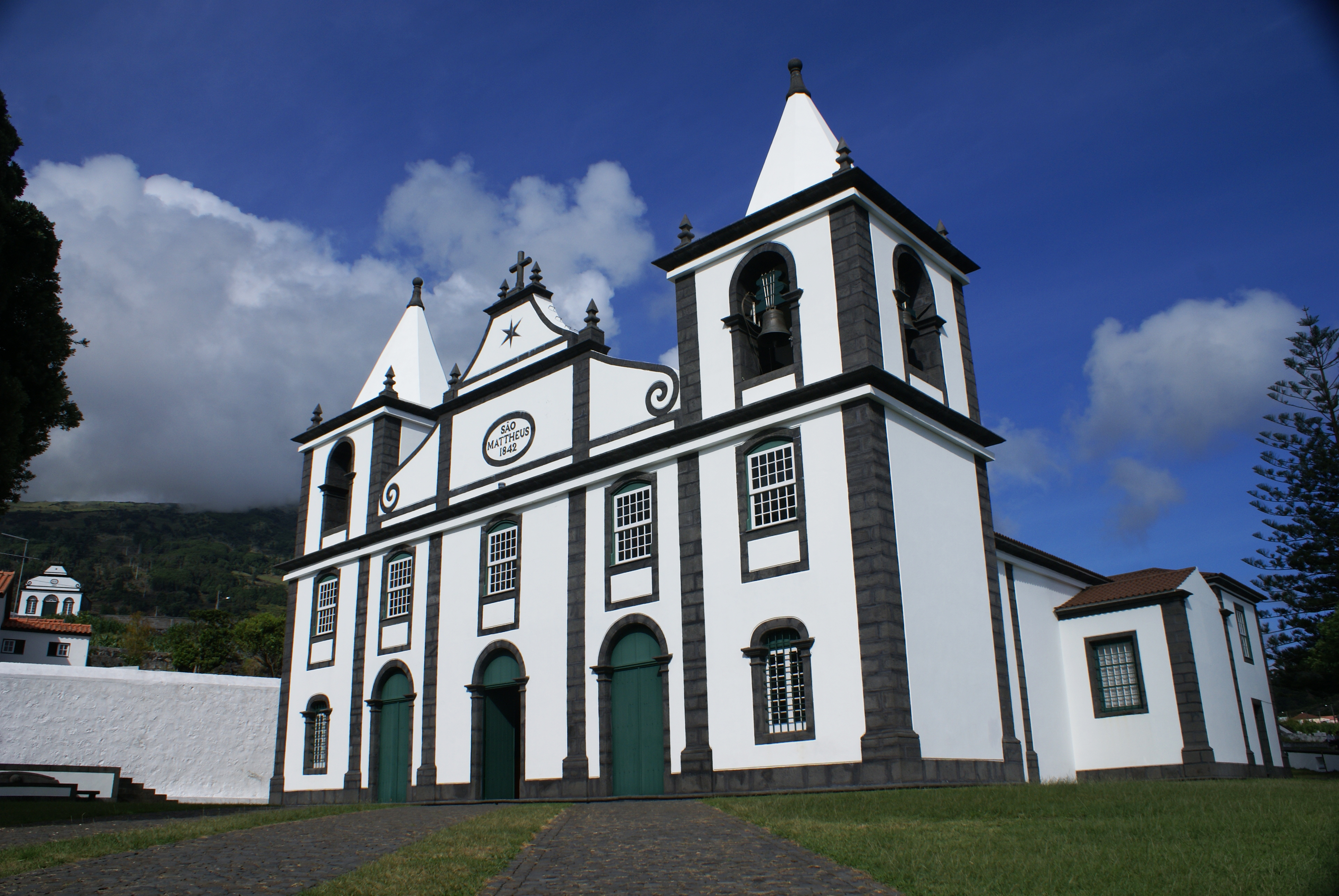
The front facade of the iconic Church of São Mateus

- Chapel of the São Mateus Cemetery (Portuguese: Capela do Cemitério de São Mateus), located on the Rua da Boa Vista and constructed in the 19th century (1890), the cemetery consists of a Baroque-style facade with arched doorway, flanked by two rounded windows, preceded by the long wall corridors of the cemetery and Gothic-like entrance gate.
- Hermitage of Nossa Senhora da Conceição (Portuguese: Ermida de Nossa Senhora da Conceição), constructed in 1753, consisting of a single nave buildings with simple triangular frontspeice surmounted by cross. Alongside is a complementary simple bell-tower with two rounded-arch bellrey over rectangular doorway.
- Church of Bom Jesus Milagroso (Portuguese: Sanctuário do Bom Jesus Milagroso de São Mateus/Igreja Parochial de São Mateus), often believed to be dedicated to Saint Mathew, the parochial church in this parish is actually dedicated to the Miraculous Jesus Christ, its present facade completed in 1842.
