= Gruta das Torres =

Lava cave in Pico Island, Azores

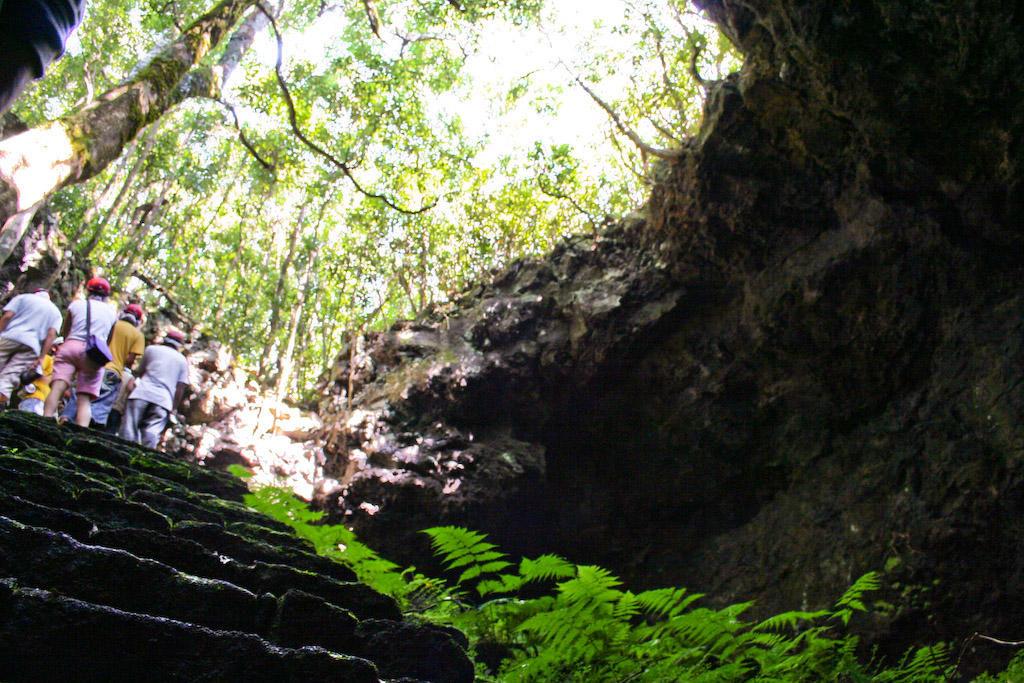
- Entrance to Gruta das Torres
- Interactive map of Gruta das Torres
- Location: Criação Velha, Pico Island, Azores
- Coordinates: 38°29′39.48″N 28°30′8.64″W
- Discovery: 1990
- Geology: Lava tube
- Entrances: Two
- Difficulty: Easy
- Access: Public

Gruta das Torres (Portuguese: Grotto of Towers), is a lava cave, a geological formation of volcanic origin formed from the flow and cooling of subterranean magma rivers. This formation is located outside the parish of Criação Velha, in the municipality of Madalena, on the western flanks of the island of Pico. The cave system formed from a series of pāhoehoe lava flows which originating from the Cabeço Bravo parasitic cone about 500 to 1500 years ago. The caves are a group of interconnected lava tubes between 0.5–22 metres (2–72 ft) width, created from both pāhoehoe and ʻaʻā types of lavas generated during different geological periods. It has a height between 1.1 and 15 metres (3.6–49 ft) and is located at an elevation of 300 metres (980 ft). With an estimated length of over 5.2 km (3.2 mi) it is the longest lava cave in the Azores. Access to the cave was managed by the Mountaineering Association (“Os Montanheiros” – Núcleo da Ilha do Pico). Starting in 2011, AZORINA, SA took over the management and organization of the cave.

The cave's uniqueness lies in its impressive drainage pattern, which can be shown by the presence of more than seven layers on the walls, with lateral benches and three cornices. Gruta das Torres is one of the 17 caves (out of 28 found here) in Pico Island of the 30 caves chosen for Azores as a whole (from an overall list of for inscription under the UNESCO List of World Heritage Sites proposed by the Government of Azores).

== Discovery ==
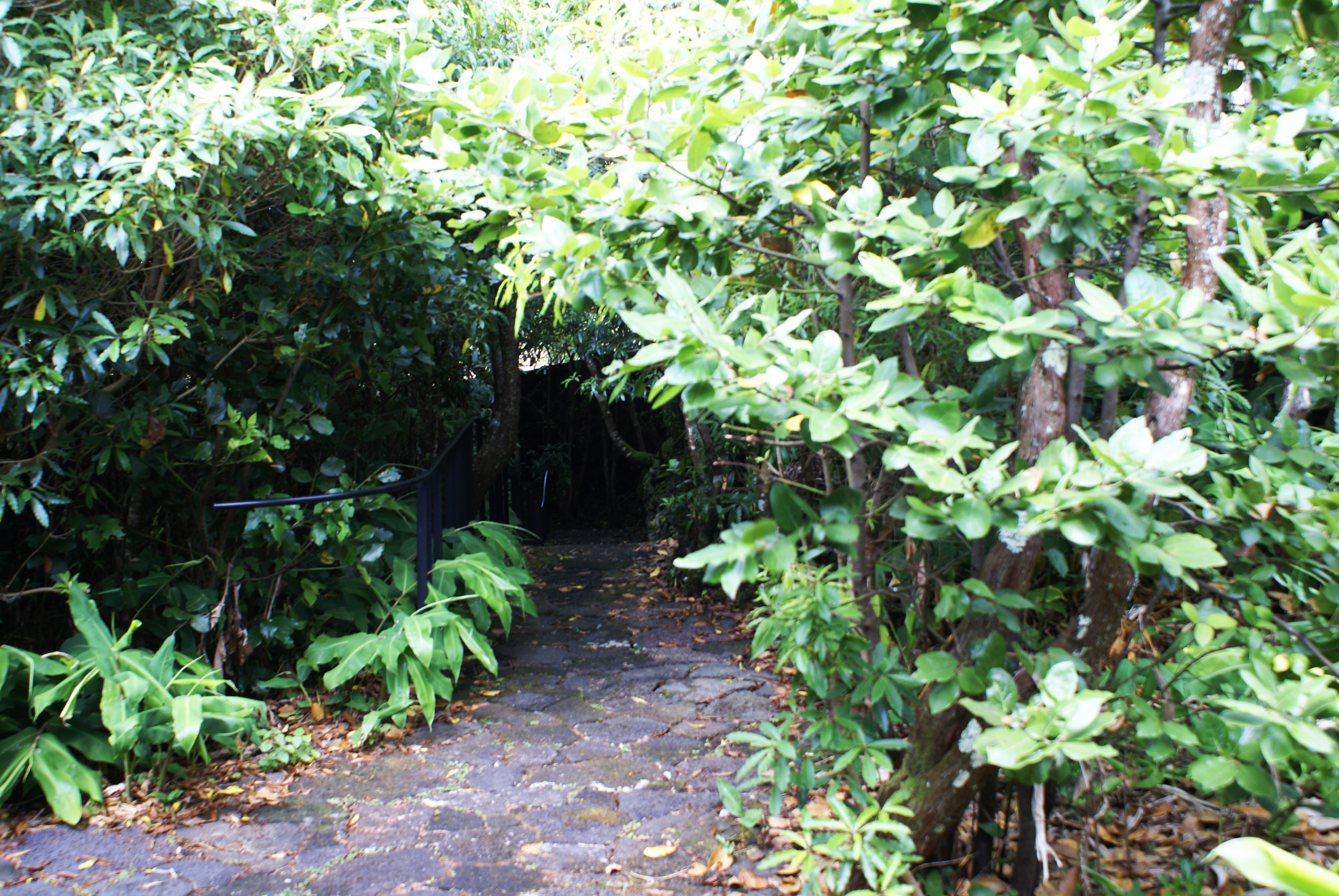
Entrance covered with vegetation

Gruta das Torres doesn't have a known date of discovery but the first scientific exploration was in 1990. Between March 28 and April 23, 1991, a "three dimensional braided system" was documented by a team of speleologists when the cave was recorded as the longest lava tube in Azores with the explored length of 3350 metres. The total length is still uncertain as parts of the tube have not been accessed yet, but it is estimated as over 5200 metres. Declared a national natural monument by the Portuguese Environmental Department, the Azores Regional Government declared the cave a regional natural monument on 18th March 2004 (Monumento Natural Regional DLR N.° 6/2004/A), the second regional natural monument to gain such a distinction, and to be honored for its unique geological setting and its length in Azores. Following this, a visitor center was planned and built as a facility for visitors. It is also inferred that the caves are a part of the volcanic phenomenon in the mountains of Azores that occurred about 1000 years ago.

== Geography ==
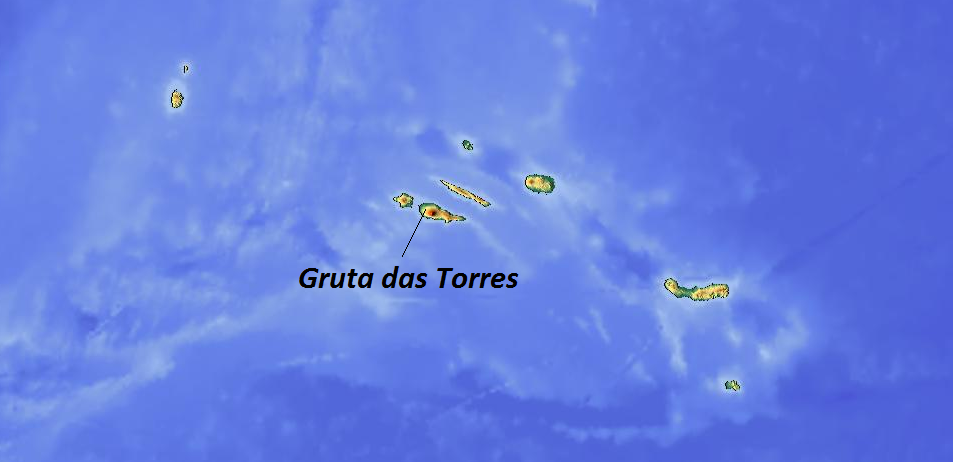
Relief map showing the location of Gruta das Torres in the Azores

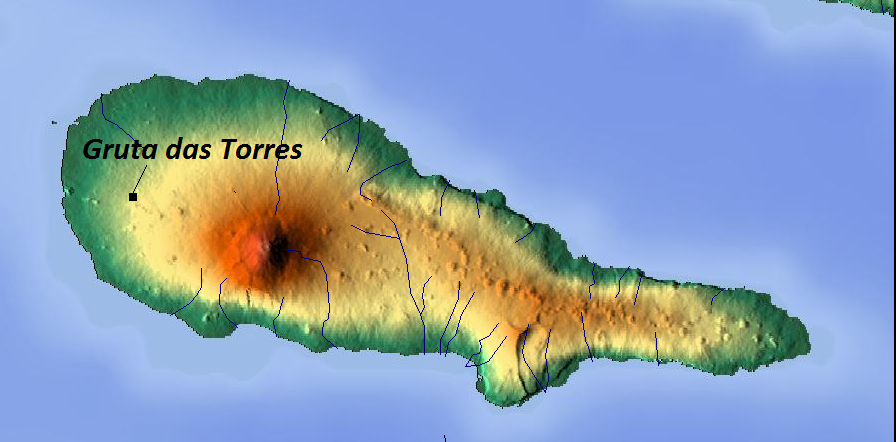
Relief map showing Gruta das Torres is located in the western-central part of Pico Island

The Gruta das Torres is located on the lower western slope of Mount Pico, located in the parish of Criação Velha in Madalena in the western-mid part of the island of Pico, in the central-south of the Azores. The Torres Grotto is one of 28 larger caves and eight pits discovered in the island of Pico, which has the largest number of caves of any island in the Azores. Most of these caves lie in the western half of Pico Island.

=== Formation ===
The Gruta das Torres is located on the slope of Pico, further down than Furna de Frei Matias, a large cave inside Pico's cone. The largest lava tube, cited by various sources to either be the longest or second longest in Azores formed by a volcanic eruption originating in Cabeço Bravo. The main part of the tunnel is fairly large with a height of 15 metres in places, although the top side of the tunnel is very small.

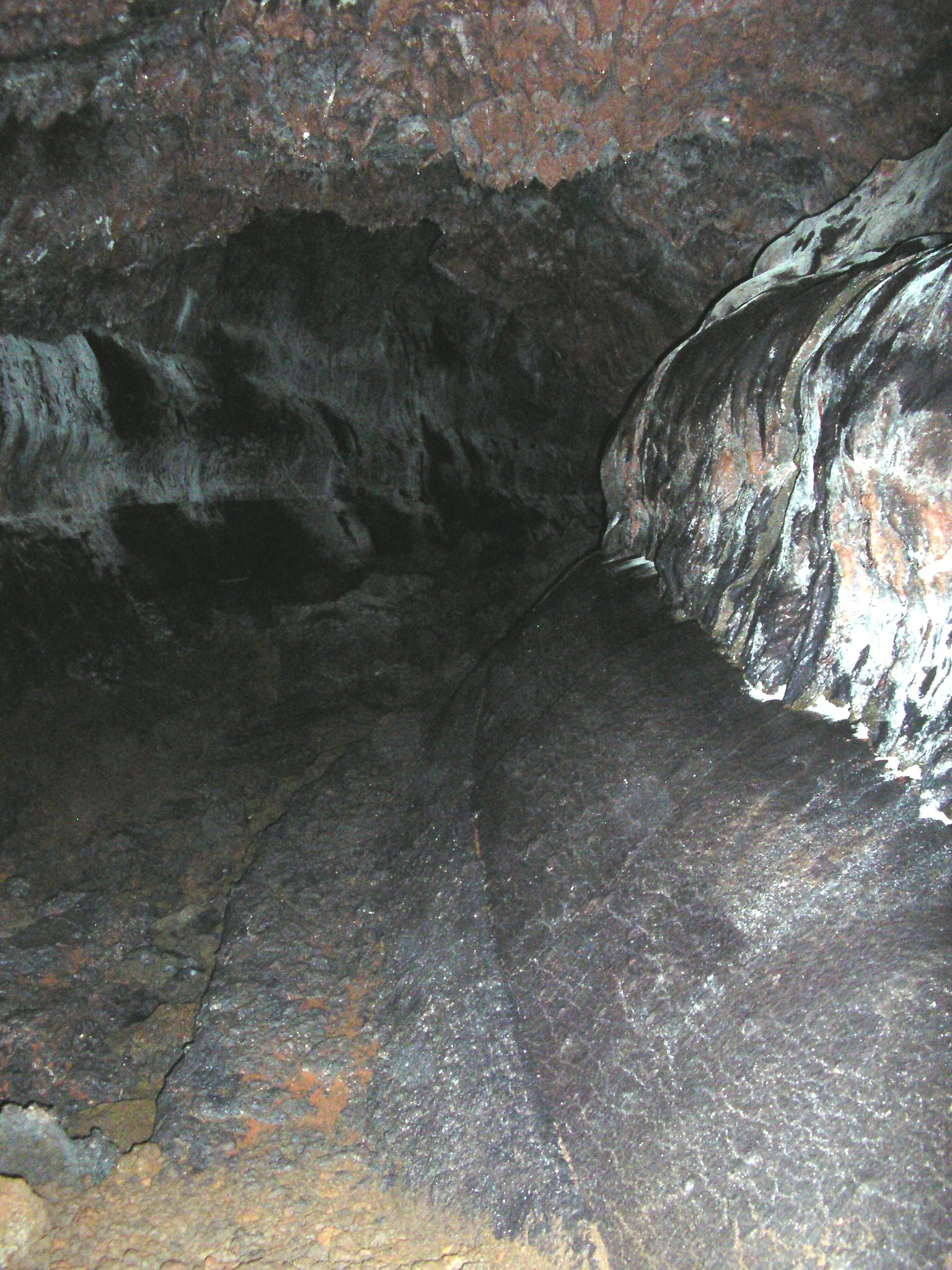
One of the lava tubes in the Gruta das Torres

The lava tunnel is at a ten-minute walking distance to the south of Madelena. A signpost near Criacao Vella directs to the Grutas Das Torres. The cave has two entrances. The first entrance is open to the sky or a day lighted roof at one end of the tunnel. The other entry is a tunnel cavern opening which is inferred to have been formed due a slump in the roof. The tunnel has clear pāhoehoe lava in some reaches while in some other reaches the roof has collapsed with large lava blocking the tunnel route making access hazardous and narrow. Lava gutters are also seen. A number of secondary tunnels also have impressive geological formations. The lava tubes have picturesque formations of stalactites (lavacicles), stalagmites, lava, lava benches and side balls or balls of lava. Considering the large size of the cave, with further scientific studies more faunal species may be discovered.

The liquid lava that dripped from the roof of Gruta das Torres has formed into picturesque stalactite and stalagmite and also in several other formations and shapes. Inside the tunnel, it is humid as water drips from the roof and a constant temperature of 16 °C (61 °F) is recorded throughout the year. However, the entrance has a slightly higher temperature. The total drop is approximately 200 m (660 ft).

The tunnels formed within a pāhoehoe type lava flow. The top of the flow cooled against the air and formed a solid crust, while beneath it the liquid lava continued to move. As the amount of liquid lava passing through them decreased, the tunnels emptied. Silica oxide is also seen in walls of the cave in some stretches of the cave. At the main entrance, after passing through the ‘Algar da Ponte’ ("Algar Bridge"), there is an avenue of trees. Some forms of plant life like ferns, mosses and lichens are also noted at the portal, floor and walls of the cave opening.

Deep inside, in the darker regions of the cave, mold, bacteria and insects have been identified. The troglobite faunal species found, typical of such caves, are the endemic species of Trechus Pico Machado and Cixius azopicavuz Hoch.

== UNESCO Heritage List ==
Considering the large number of caves found in the Azores archipelago – 271 caves under four categories of rank A, B, C and D, the Government of the Azores initiated a proposal for submission of a few selected caves to UNESCO for inscribing under the UNESCO World Heritage List. A Working Group on Volcanic Caves of Azores supported by the Azorean speleological inventory and classifying system database has identified 30 volcanic caves of rank A, which are located in the Graciosa, Pico, São Jorge, São Miguel and Terceira islands for inclusion in the UNESCO List. Of these 30 volcanoes identified for UNESCO recognition, Pico island has the maximum number of 17 volcanic caves in the proposal, which includes Gruta das Torres. The selection criteria for inclusion of the caves in the list was based on the scientific value, tourism prospects, approach conditions, perceived threats, data base and conservation standing.

== Tourism ==
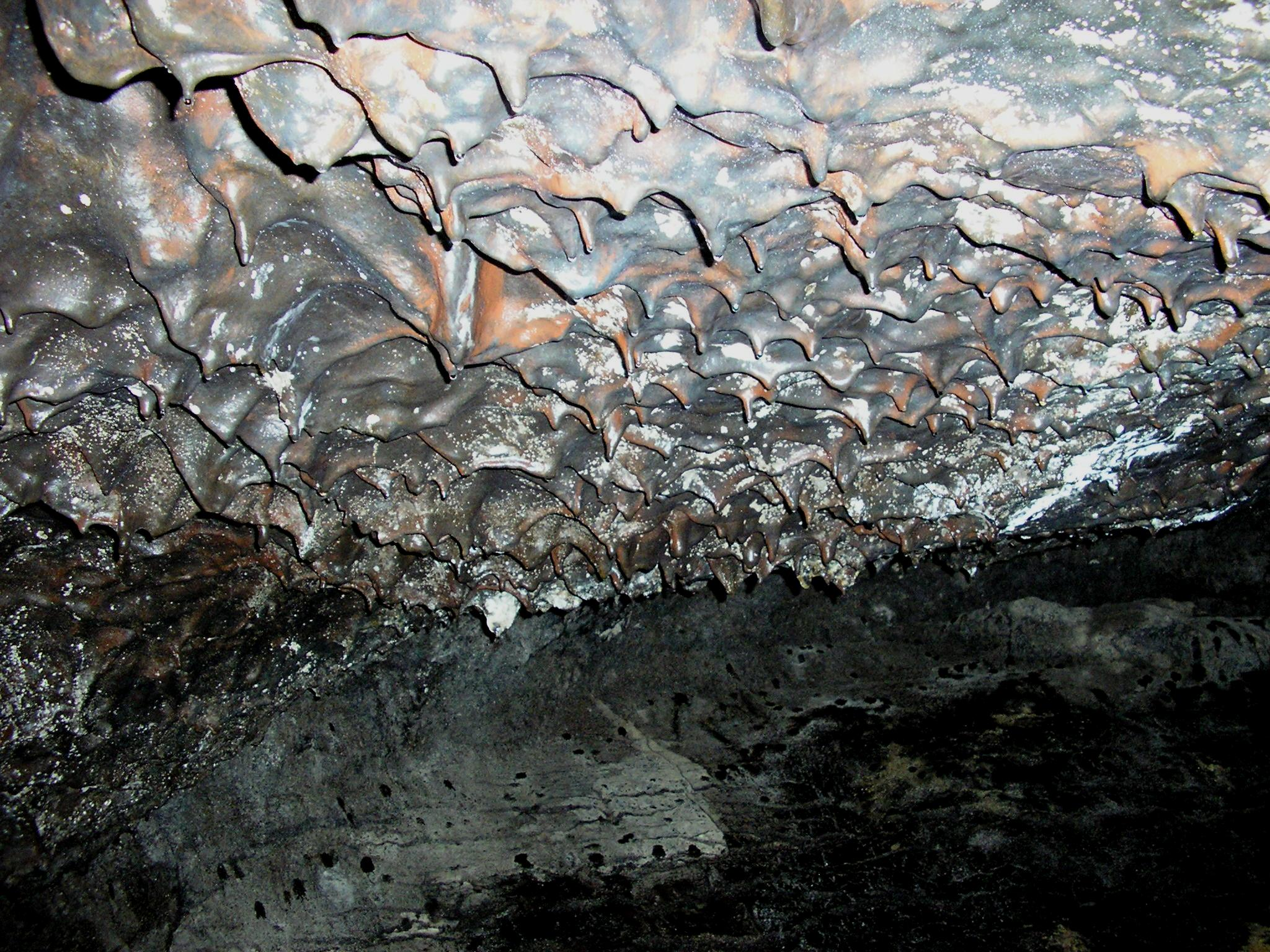
Lavacicles on the roof of one of the Gruta das Torres lava tubes

The first 450 metres (1,480 ft) are accessible to visitors accompanied by a guide. A visitor centre built in basalt rocks and aesthetically merging with the environment, provides a guided access into the cave. Gruta das Torres has been open to the public since 2005. Visitors are allowed in groups of 15 at a time and each visitor is provided with a protective gear of a helmet fitted with lamps to see the dark interior. At the visitor centre, audiovisual presentations in English and Portuguese give details about the cave. As of 2011, the tours are scheduled for 10:30, 12:00, 13:30, 15:00 and 16:30 for the months of higher visitation (15 June to 15 September).

The visitors' support center at the entrance to the cave has innovative architectural features – “a circular sweep and a linear spatial organization – a sequence of programmatic spaces that prepare visitors for the spectacle below.” It was awarded the "European Union Prize for Contemporary Architecture Mies van der Rohe Award 2007", in Barcelona. It was a formal award presented by the European Union, in association with the Mies van der Rohe Foundation.

The innovative construction of the visitor center ensures that the cave entrance has full exposure to the skylight. To achieve this, the layout has incorporated techniques of local building architecture in the form of 'currais de figueira' meaning 'fig tree walls” structure. Such walls used to be part of the vineyards in the region as protection from wind and seawater. This front elevation forms the natural southern part of the building. The wall which is 1.8 meters (5 ft 11 in) in height has an “open-weave structure” or undulating structure to permit natural lighting to the entire building, thus eliminating provision of windows. It also provides protection to the entrance into the tunnel. The building also incorporates a design which provides uniform illumination of the interior. It eliminates the need for other openings. Except for the wall at the entrance, the main building is painted with a waterproof black colour finish to match with the colour and texture of the vitrified lava inside the cave.
