= Tektonica Prize =

Architecture prize

The Tektonica Prize was created by the Portuguese Industrial Association and the Lisbon International Fair (PIA - LIF), with the support of the Portuguese Architects Association. It is awarded annually to promote public recognition of professional values in the field of architecture. Past winners have included Utopia Lda's pedestrian bridge and Centre of Visitors of the Caves Gruta das Torres in 2009.
