= Candelária (Madalena) =

- Civil parish
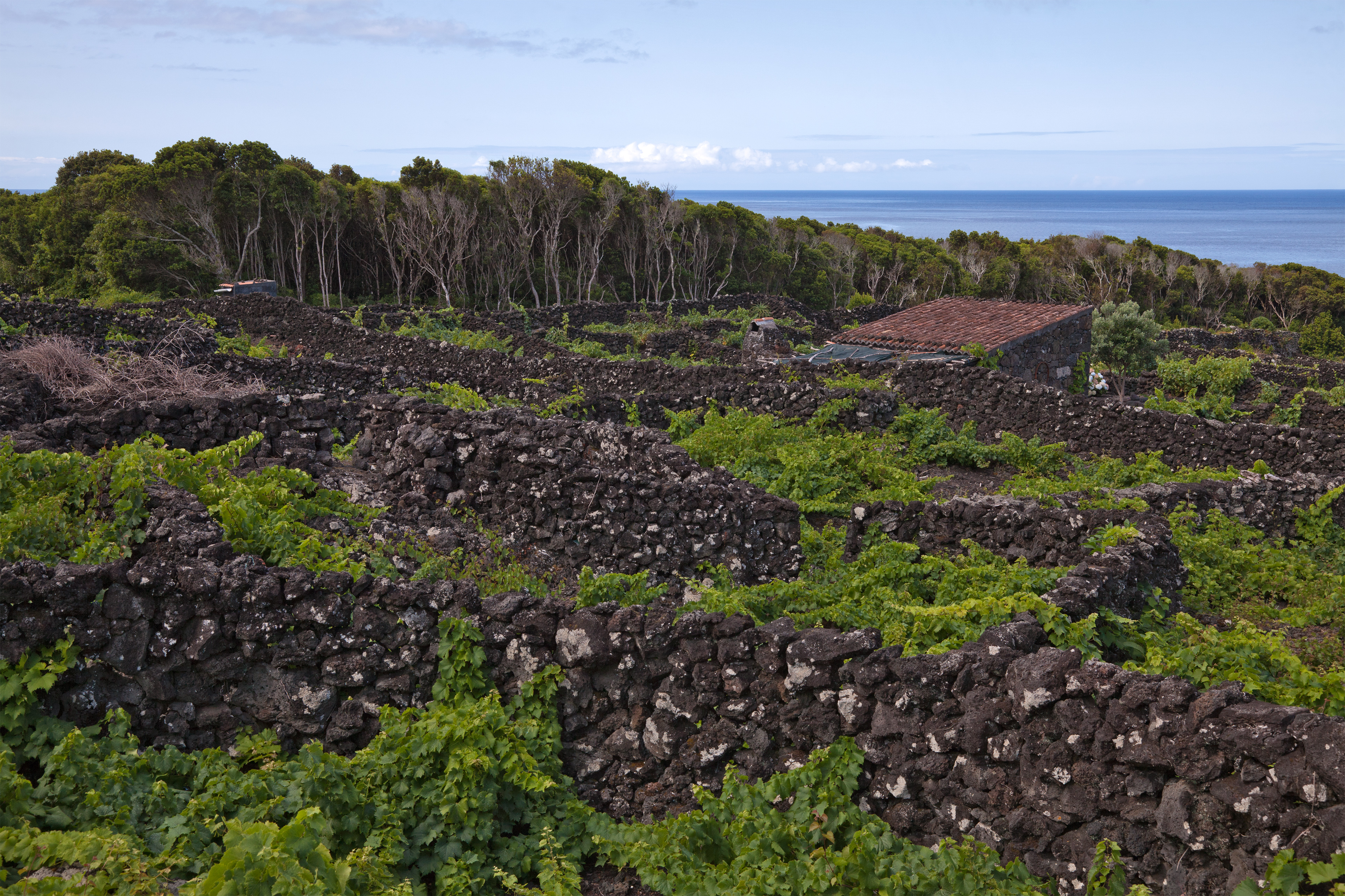
- The hedgerows dividing the vineyards in the civil parish of Candelária

- The location of the civil parish of Candélaria in the municipality of Madalena
- Coordinates: 38°27′51″N 28°30′49″W
- Country: Portugal
- Auton. region: Azores
- Island: Pico
- Municipality: Madalena

Area
  - Total: 29.70 km^{2} (11.47 sq mi)
- Elevation: 73 m (240 ft)

Population (2011)
  - Total: 822
  - Density: 27.7/km^{2} (71.7/sq mi)
- Time zone: UTC−01:00 (AZOT)
  - Summer (DST): UTC+00:00 (AZOST)
- Postal code: 9950-126
- Area code: 292
- Patron: Nossa Senhora das Candeias

Candelária is a civil parish located on the western coast of the island of Pico, in the municipality of Madalena in the Azores. The population in 2011 was 822, in an area of 29.70 km^{2}. It contains the localities Biscoitos, Campo Raso, Candelária, Canada das Adegas, Canada Negra, Canto, Eira, Fogos, Guindaste, Mirateca, Monte, Pedras, Pocinho, Porto de Ana Clara, Porto do Calhau and São Nuno.

== History ==
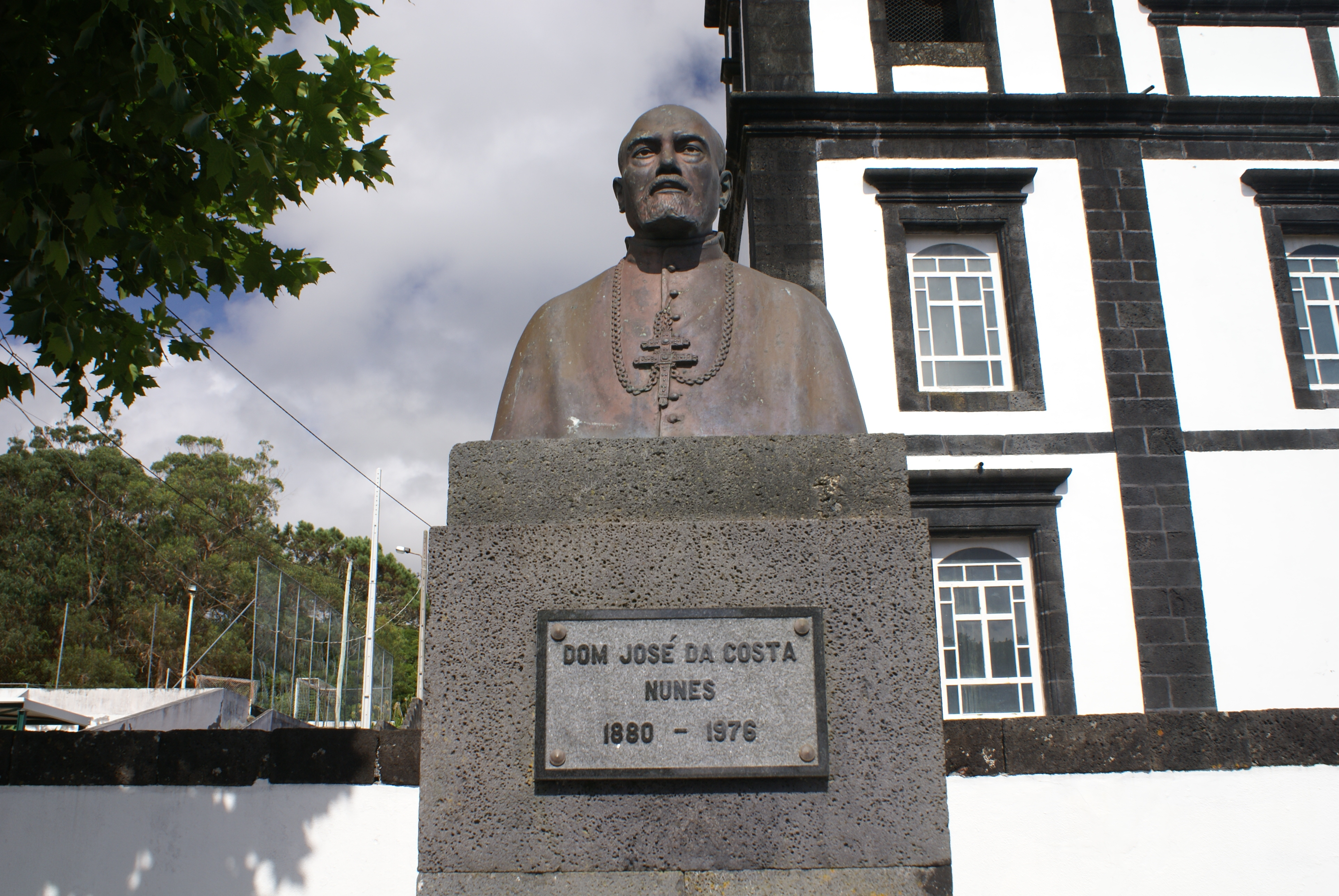
The bust of Cardinal José da Costa Nunes

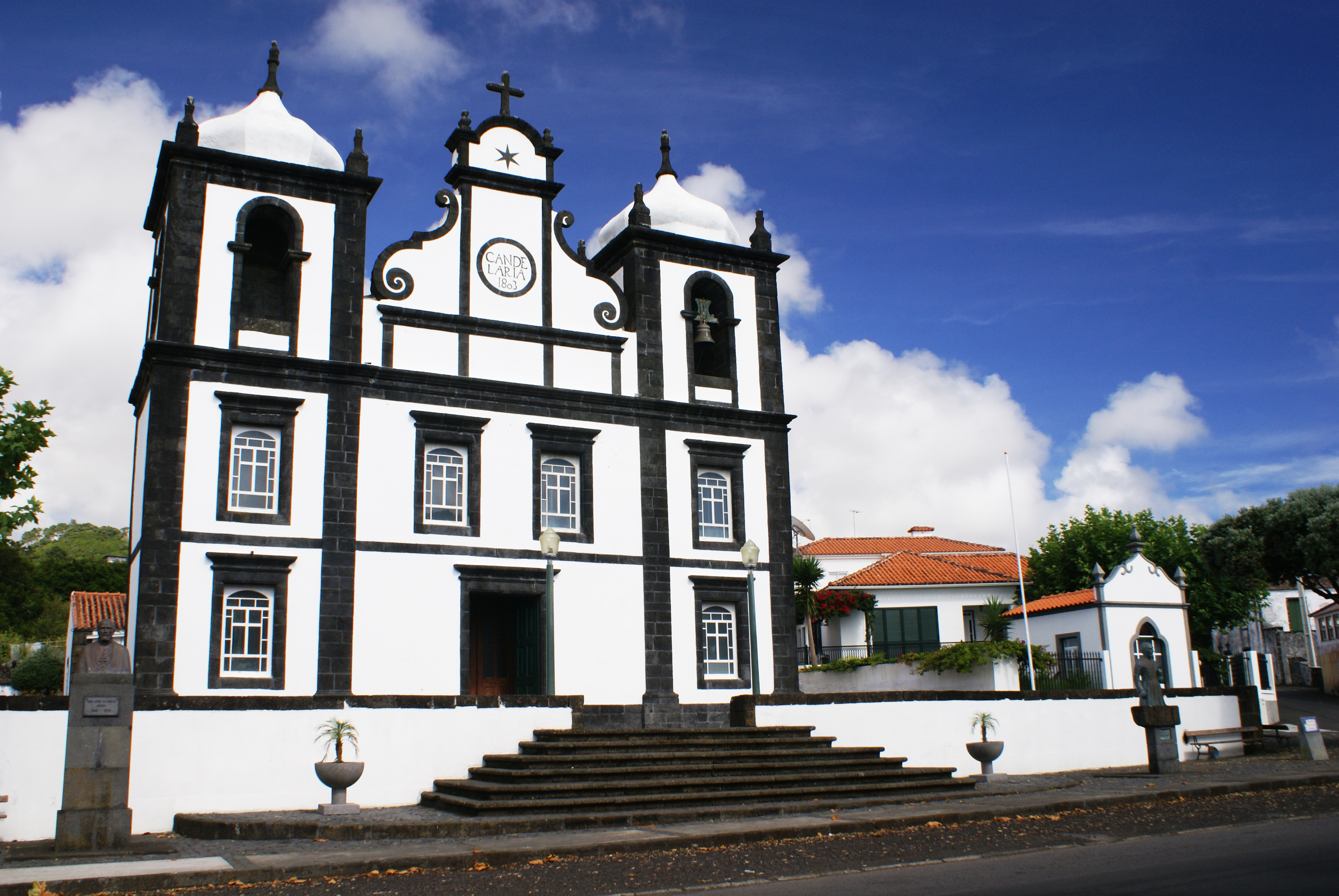
The Church of Nossa Senhora da Candeias, located along the roadway between Monte and Mirateca

This was the birthplace of the late cardinal José da Costa Nunes.

== Geography ==
Linked by the Regional E.R.1-1ª roadway to the parishes of Criação Velha (to the north) and São Caetano (to the southeast), the parish is primarily a coastal agricultural community. From the coast, for about 2 kilometres (1.2 mi), the parish comprises cultivatable lands and settlements, which starts sloping into higher altitudes, reaching its extreme at Ponta do Pico; the parish is basically a pie-shaped wedge, with 8.6 kilometres (5.3 mi) at its extreme, along the coast. Settled areas are divided equally between hedge-row-divided parcels and forested patches of land, with scrub and natural vegetation occupying higher altitudes.

In addition to central Candelária (which also encompasses the communities of Biscoitos, Alto and Eira) there are smaller hamlets within the borders that follow the regional roadway, such as: Monte, Mirateca and Campo Raso.

== Architecture ==
=== Religious ===
- Church of Nossa Senhora das Candeias (Portuguese: Igreja Paroquial de Candelária/Igreja de Nossa Senhora das Candeias), located along the roadway, the church was founded in 1803, and was the parish of Cardinal José da Costa Nunes. A bust of the clergyman is installed in front of the temple.
