= Madalena (Madalena) =

- Civil parish
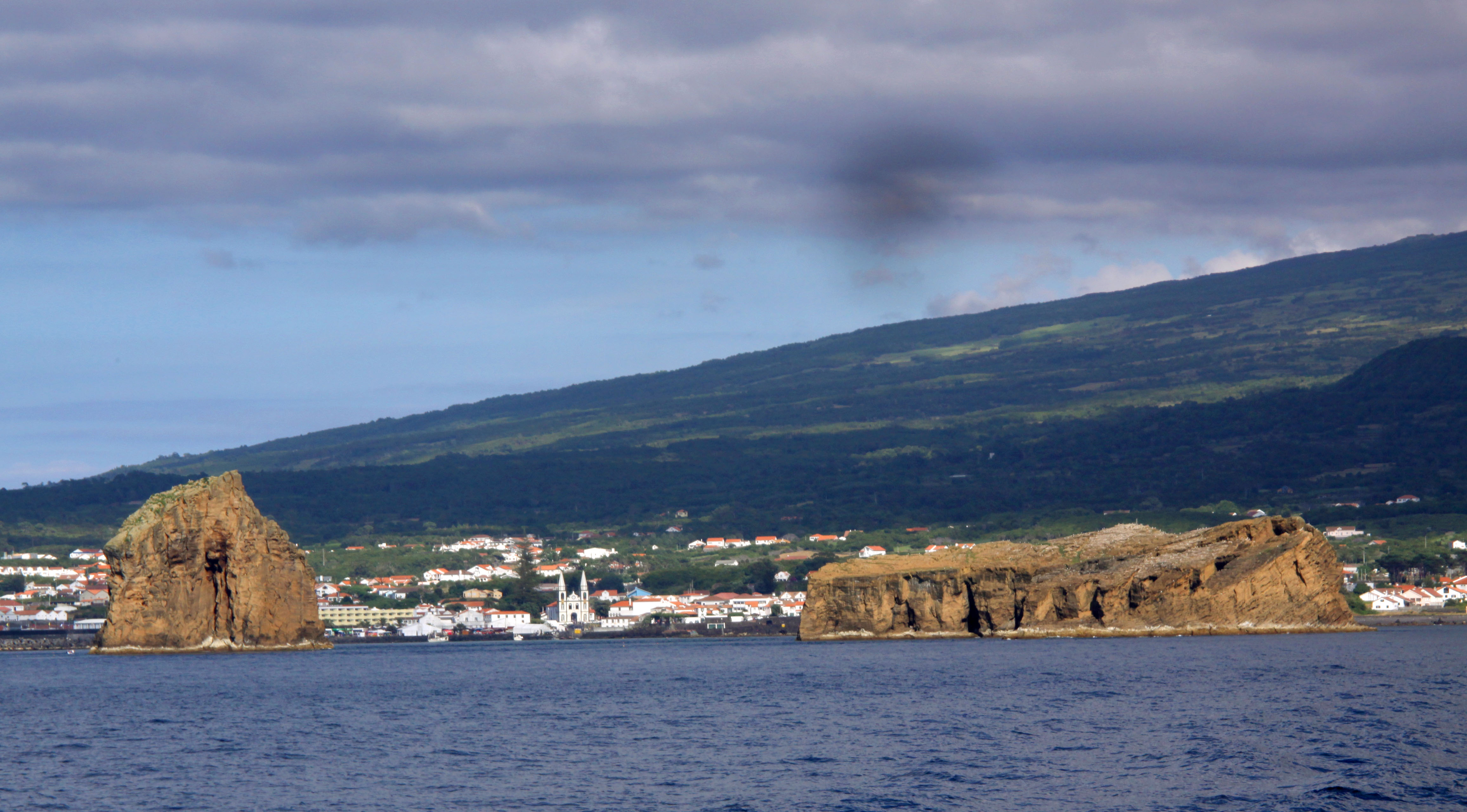
- The sentinels of the parish of Madalena, the Ihéu em Pé and the Ilhéu Caido

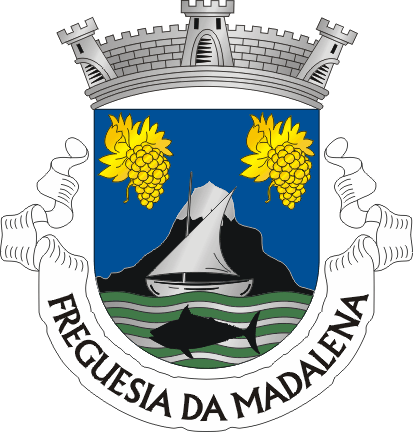
- Coat of arms

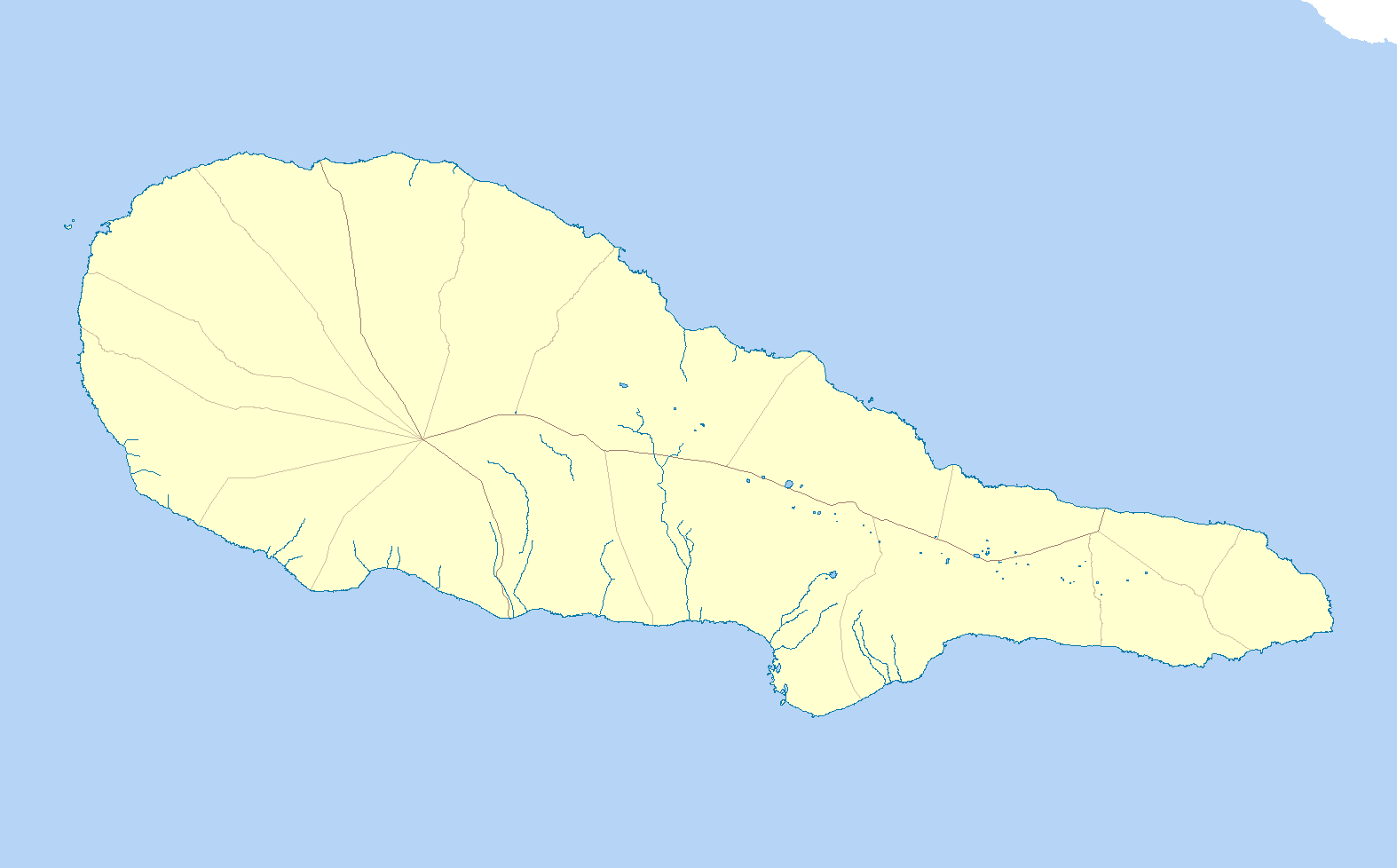
- Location in the Azores Madalena (Pico)
- Coordinates: 38°32′0″N 28°31′38″W
- Country: Portugal
- Auton. region: Azores
- Island: Pico
- Municipality: Madalena
- Established: Settlement: 15th century Parish: 1542

Area
  - Total: 35.59 km^{2} (13.74 sq mi)

Population (2011)
  - Total: 2,581
  - Density: 72.52/km^{2} (187.8/sq mi)
- Time zone: UTC−01:00 (AZOT)
  - Summer (DST): UTC+00:00 (AZOST)
- Patron: Santa Maria Madalena
- Website: jfmadalenapico.pt

Madalena is a civil parish in the municipality (concelho) of Madalena in the Portuguese archipelago of the Azores. The population in 2011 was 2,581, in an area of 35.59 km². The parish of Madalena is the authority responsible for the administration and distribution of social services and economic programs in the local seat of the municipality of the same name. It contains the localities Areia Larga, Barca, Cabo Branco, Madalena, Sete Cidades, Toledos and Valverde.

== History ==
Originally known as Lugar dos Ilhéus (literally, the place of the islets), the parish was founded sometime before 1542. Fisherman had established a small colony of homes during the first half of the 15th century. At that time, the parish included the areas known as Toledos, Sete Cidades, Cabo Branco, Barca, Valverde, and Areia Larga.

== Geography ==
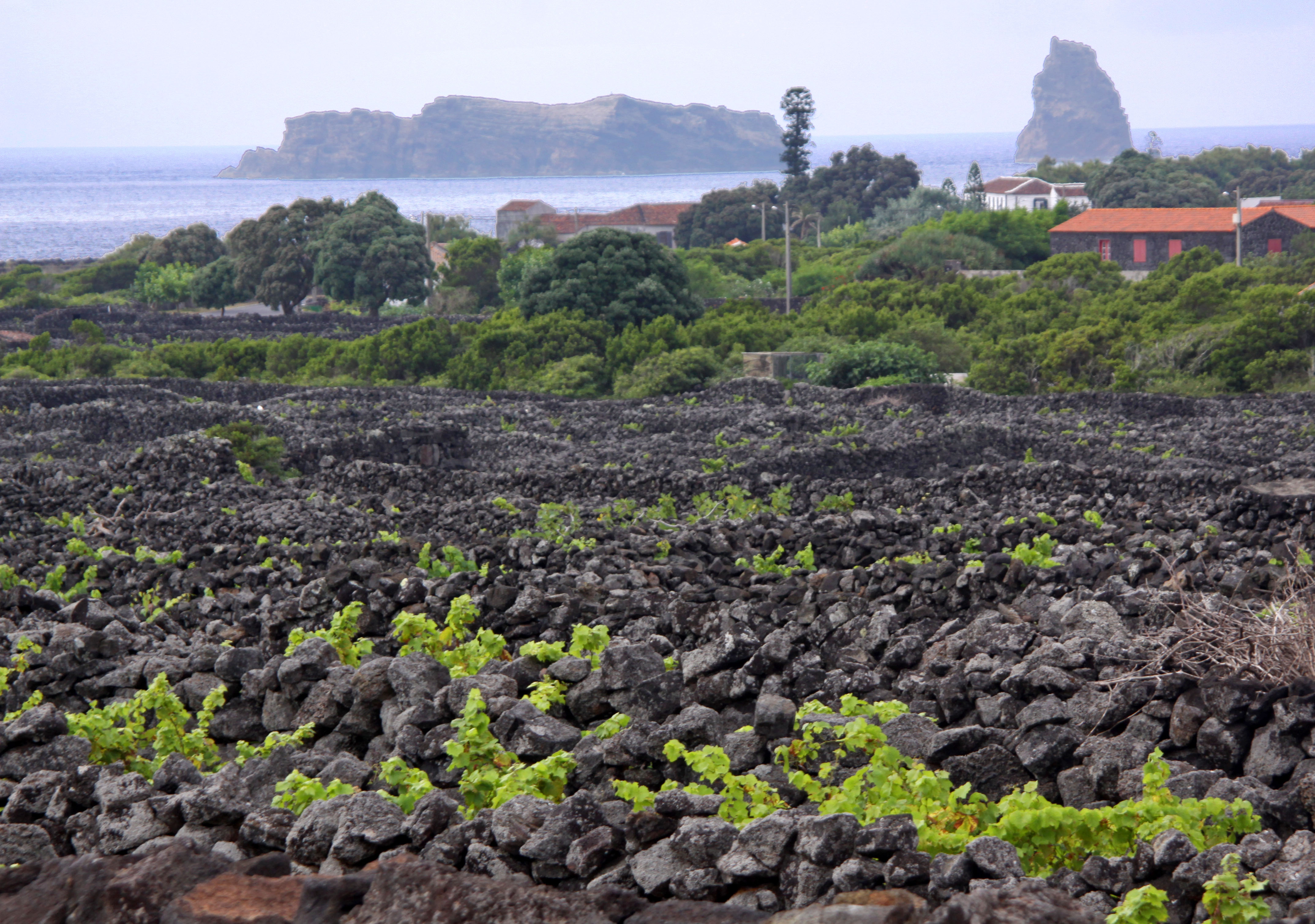
The vineyards of Areia Longa, classified by UNESCO as a World Heritage Site

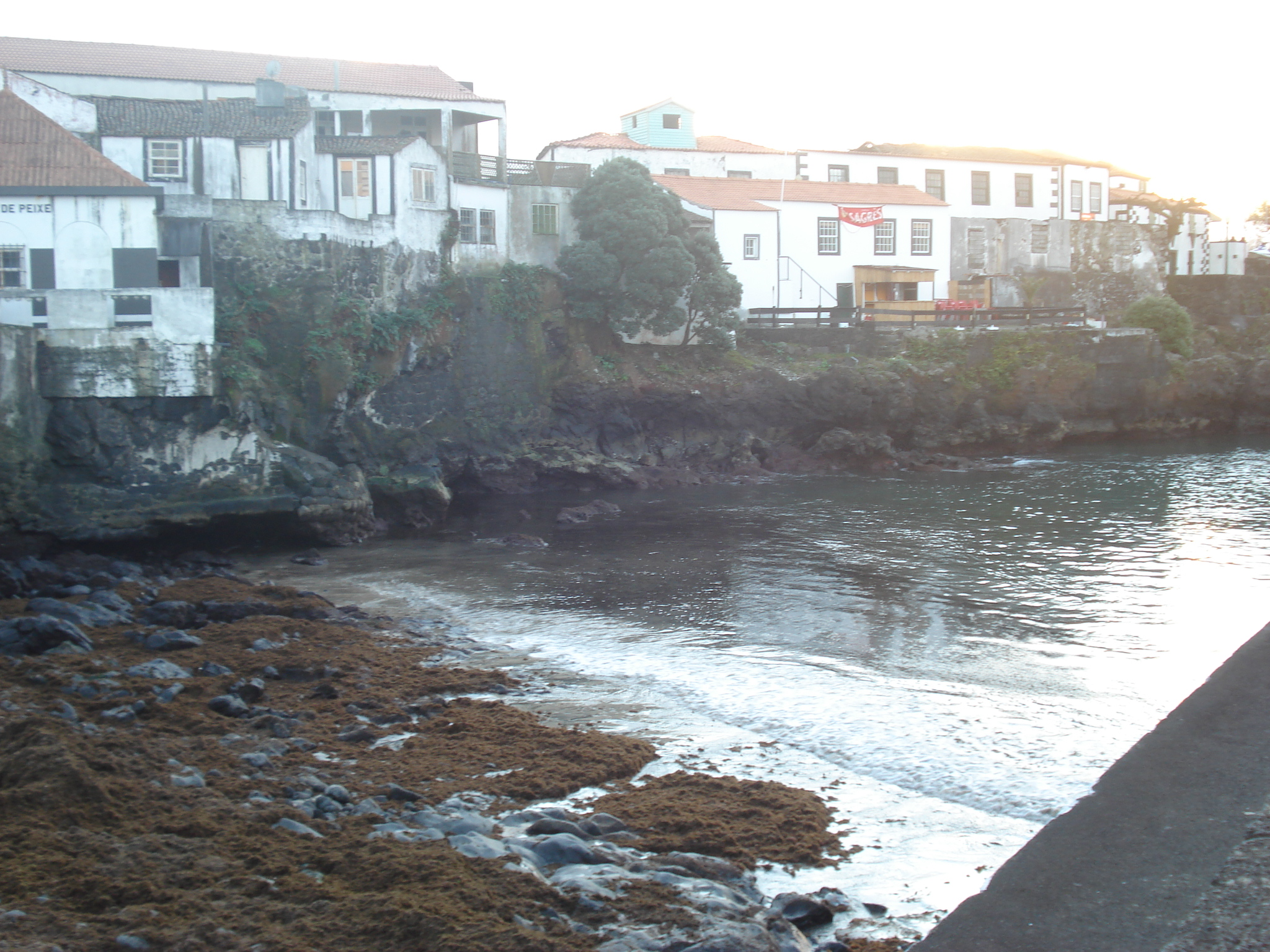
The old port and fish market in Madalena

The parish is bounded by the parishes of Bandeiras to the north and west and Criação Velha to the south: a pie-shaped wedge that extends from the coast to the summit of Pico. The main regional E.R.1-2ª roadway travels along the coast into Madalena, from Baixio Grande in the northeast (at Bandeiras) to Sertão and Canada João Paulinho in the southwest (at the border with Criação Velha). Meanwhile, near the main medical centre, the E.R.3-2ª bisects the parish and continues to the centre of the island: the former Estrada Longitudanal. Finally, from the main square (Largo Cardeal Costa Nunes) a variant of the E.R.1-2ª continues to Bandeiras.

== Economy ==
Agriculture, herding, dairy, vineyards, fishing, shipbuilding, and sawmilling have been the primary industries in the region since its creation. These activities were extended by civil construction, carpentry, hotels, restaurants, and other public services, with most of the half of the 20th century dedicated to tourism-related projects.

== Architecture ==
The region's rich architectural heritage is preserved by several buildings, such as the parochial Church of Santa Maria Madalena (Igreja de Santa Maria Madalena), which was initially constructed in the 16th century, later reconstructed in the 19th century, and then severely damaged during an earthquake on 9 July 1998. Many of the former homes and estates of early colonists, including the island's Captain-Major (in Valverde), the estate manorhouses of Verdelho wine producers (dating to the 18th and 19th centuries) in Areia Larga; and the homes along zones of Valverde, Bicadas and maritime coast.

=== Civic ===
- Sub-Regional Hospital of Madalena (Hospital Sub-Regional de Madalena), constructed in the mid-20th century, the modernist medical centre was part of mid-century improvements on the islands, that saw the construction of various institutions;
- Municipal Hall of Madalena (Câmara Municipal de Madalena), survived its construction in the 18th century

=== Religious ===
- Church of Santa Maria Maior (Igreja Paroquial da Madalena/Igreja de Santa Maria Madalena), the 18th century church was, as Silveira de Macedo indicated, the church was "the first temple on the island with the grandeur and magnificence";
- Convent of the Jesuits (Convento dos Jesuitas), located in Toledos;
- Convent of the Carmelites (Convento do Carmo), which today functions as a wine museum (along the Rua do Carmo)

Numerous Impérios, which were dedicated to the festivals of the Holy Spirit held in Madalena, Valverde, Cabo Branco, and Sete Cidades, also preserve Madalena's building styles.

== Culture ==
Madalena is both the largest and most populous parish in the municipality, and centre for many of the social groups, associations, recreational sports and cultural entities to support the population. Its historic and cultural roots are promoted by groups such as the Grupo folclórico da Casa do Povo da Madalena (Folklore Group of the Casa do Povo), founded in September 1978; the Filarmónica Lira Madalenense (Madalena Philharmonic Band), established in 1897 (in the area of Sete Cidades); the Filarmónica União e Progresso Madalenense (Madalena Progress and Union Philharmonic Band), which has existed since 1917; and the Grupo Coral (Choral Group) of the Academia Musical da Ilha do Pico (Pico Musical Academy) instituted in 1988; in addition to the cultural and sports clubs associated with the volunteer fire department (Bombeiros Voluntários da Madalena), itself conceived in 2001, the Clube de Futebol (football club), Clube Naval (naval club) and Clube Desportivo da Casa do Povo da Madalena (Sports Club of the Casa do Povo).
