= Utopia Lda =

Portuguese design firm

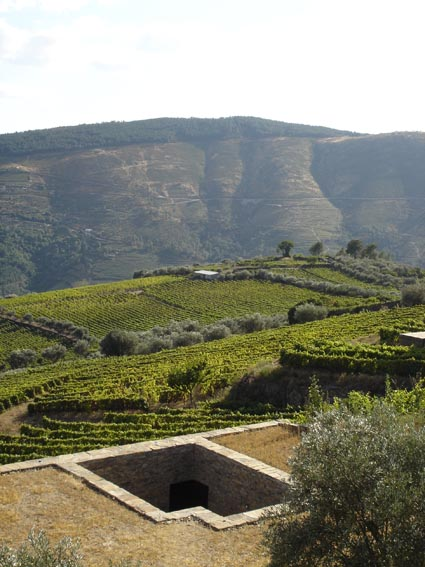
Sustainable house in Provezende

Utopia Lda is a Portuguese design firm providing services in architecture, town planning, objects design, engineering and web design. Its main goal is to create a sustainable environment.

== Awards ==
In April 2004 this firm won the Tektonica Prize.

== Works ==
Utopia 's main emblematic buildings, include:

- House in Provezende, (2005)
- House in Covilhã, (2006)
- Theatre in Ovar, (2007)
- House in Mindelo, (2008)
