= Madalena, Ceará =

Municipality in Ceará, Brazil

Madalena
- Municipality
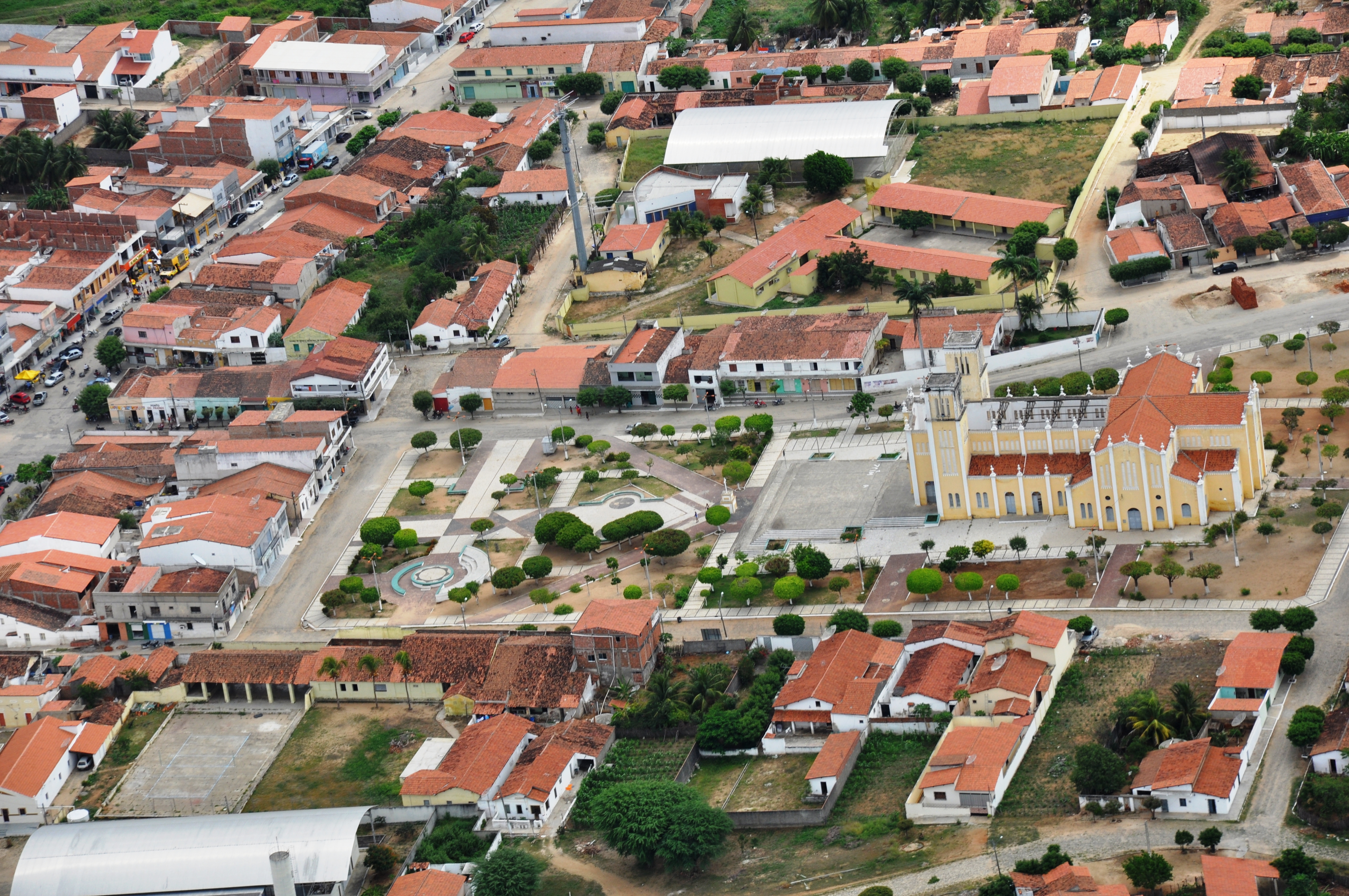
- Aerial view of Igreja Matriz de Madalena in central Madalena

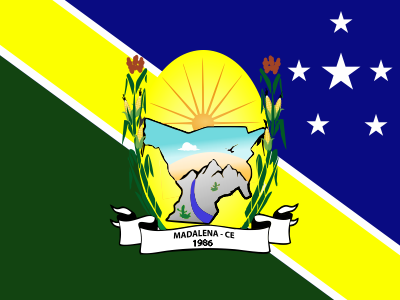
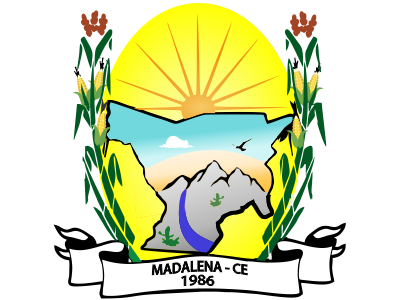
- Flag Coat of arms

- Location in Ceará state

- Location in Brazil
- Coordinates: 4°51′25″S 39°34′37″W
- Country: Brazil
- Region: Northeast
- State: Ceará

Area
  - Total: 1,035 km^{2} (400 sq mi)

Population (2020)
  - Total: 19,864
  - Density: 19.19/km^{2} (49.71/sq mi)
- Time zone: UTC−3 (BRT)

Madalena is a municipality in the state of Ceará, Brazil. The population is 19,864 (2020 est.) in an area of 1,035 km². It is located 180 km from Fortaleza, the state's capital. It is in the central part of the state. The municipality was formed in 1989, after having been part of the district of Quixeramobim. Roman Catholic churches include Our lady of the Immaculate Conception or Nossa Senhora da Conceição. The altitude is 299 m. The postal code is 63860-000.

Madalena is home to the Mother Totonha Maternity Hospital, Bank of Brazil, Post Office, Lottery Agency, and the Forum. It is divided into six districts: Headquarters, Macaoca, Cajazeiras, Union, New Cacimba, and White Cocks. The District is the largest of Macaoca, 16 km from the municipal seat, the BR-020 is closer to the state capital. Its economy is based on farming, but also has diversified trade with the Teotônio Edson Queiroz Corporate Finance Group. The town was built around one of the largest Catholic churches in Brazil. The city also has a modern art museum, the Casartma - Magdalene House of Art, in which several works by regional and municipal artists are regularly displayed.
