= São Caetano (Madalena) =

- Civil parish
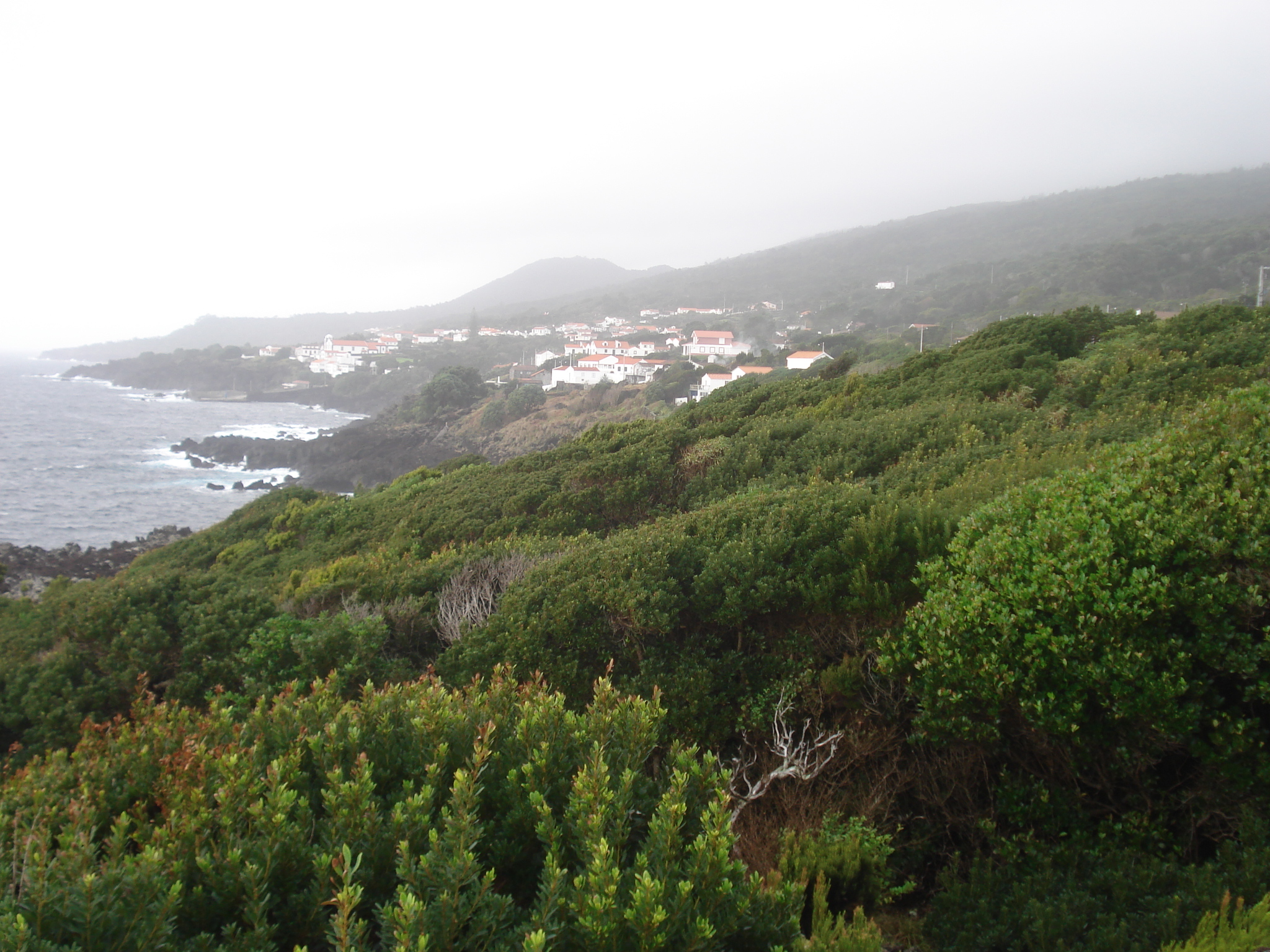
- View of Terra de Pão with the town of São Caetano in the far distance

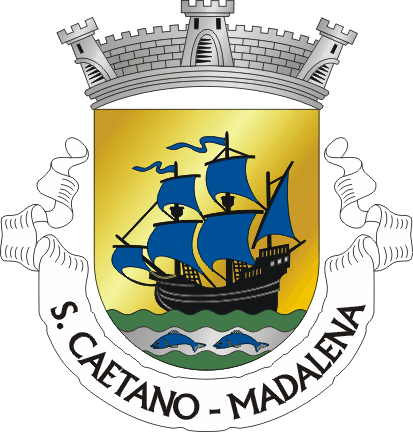
- Coat of arms

- Location of São Caetano within the municipality of Madalena, Pico Island
- Coordinates: 38°25′51″N 28°25′46″W
- Country: Portugal
- Auton. region: Azores
- Island: Pico
- Municipality: Madalena

Area
  - Total: 23.88 km^{2} (9.22 sq mi)
- Elevation: 99 m (325 ft)

Population (2011)
  - Total: 480
  - Density: 20/km^{2} (52/sq mi)
- Time zone: UTC−01:00 (AZOT)
  - Summer (DST): UTC+00:00 (AZOST)
- Postal code: 9950-422
- Area code: 292
- Patron: São Caetano
- Website: https://jf-saocaetano.blogspot.com/

São Caetano (Portuguese for 'Saint Cajetan') (pronounced [sɐ̃w kɐj.ˈtɐ.nu]) is a civil parish in the municipality of Madalena along the southwestern coast of the island of Pico, the Portuguese Azores. The population in 2011 was 480, in an area of 23.88 km^{2}.

== History ==
The settlement of the region of São Caetano began with natives from the north of Portugal, after a period of settlement in Terceira and Graciosa, that included many slaves and Africans. These first settlers were devoted to the Saint Caetano, including Father Vicenza, and Francisco Pires of Flores, who ordered the construction of the first hermitage to the saint. During this period, it was part of the settlement of São Mateus, founded in 1482.

In the early period of discovery, the island of Pico was to have its own Captain-Donatário, Álvaro de Ornelas, but never achieved this position, owing to the island's incorporation in the Captaincy of Faial and Pico, under Josse de Huertre's administration.

Initially, oriented to the cultivation of wheat and corn, while exporting woad, over time the population began to cultivate vineyards and began fishing.

The parish of São Caetano is also known as Prainha do Sul or Galeão, in honour of Garcia Gonçalves Madruga who built here in the 16th century, as payment to King John III, for his debits.

Another point of interest occurred during the construction of the parochial church, by Manuel da Silveira de Melo; there was a shortage of timer, which greatly retarded the construction of the church, also aggravated by a strong storm that affect the entire island. At the same time a ship wrecked laden with wheat and timber, which ended-up being used for the construction of the parochial temple. The local populous attributed these to acts of God and a miracle, as it occurred at a timely point the parish's life.

== Geography ==
The parish is located in the southern part of the municipality and borders the neighbouring municipality of Lajes do Pico, 18 kilometres (11 mi) from the municipal seat. It is a geologically accented region marked by evidence of lava fields and landslides extending from the coast to the summit of Ponta do Pico. Most of the land is covered in dense forests, and most settlements has tended to follow the Regional Road E.R. 1-1ª. Most agriculture is concentrated around São Caetano principally, while parcels along the coast have been used for wine vineyards.

In addition to São Caetano, which is located in the western portion of the parish, the other principal settlement is the village of Terra de Pão, located in the opposite end. Other localities in the parish are Baixas, Cabeço, Caminho de Cima, Fontes, Prainha do Galeão, Queimadas, Rua de Cima and Santa Margarida.

== Architecture ==
The most significant built-up patrimony in the parish include the parochial church, the hermitage of Santa Margarida, the tidal pools, Casa do Povo and some older adegas (or wine-cellars). The national directory of patrimony has classified the following, as national monuments or properties of public interest:

- Church of São Caetano (Portuguese: Igreja Paroquial de São Caetano/Igreja de São Caetano), a two-storey church with a facade of arched windows and principal doorway, topped by steeple, erected in 1878;
- Império of São Caetano (Portuguese: Império do Espírito Santo de São Caetano), 20th century religious architecture, consisting of a rectangular império/chapel and building, with an arched facade flanked by pilasters, with polychromatic structural elements;
