= Madalena, Azores =

Madalena
- Municipality
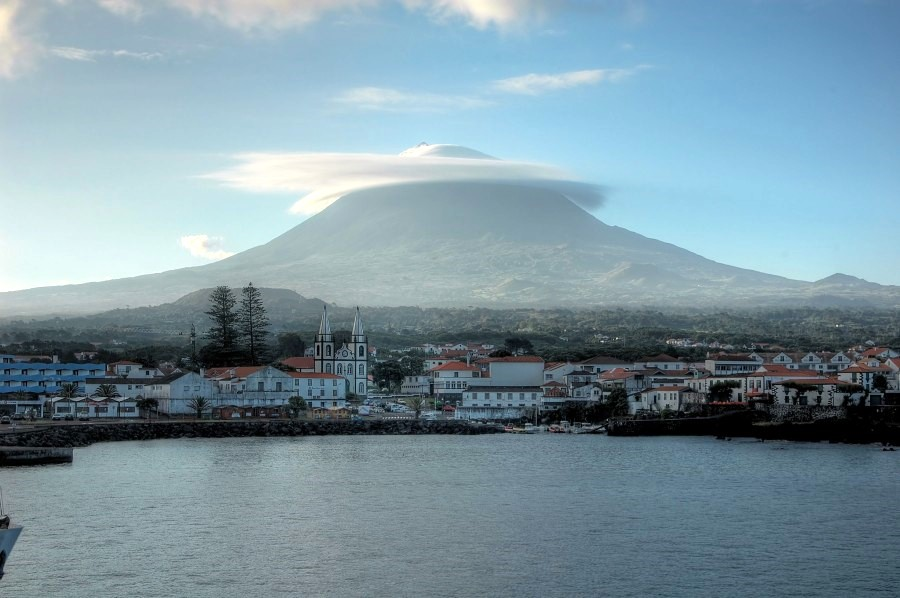
- View off the coast of Madalena parish, showing the stratovolcano Pico and settlement of the municipal seat

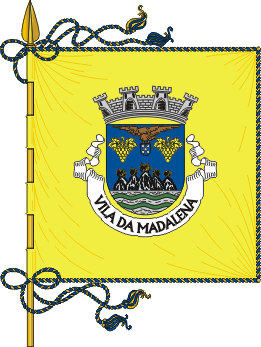
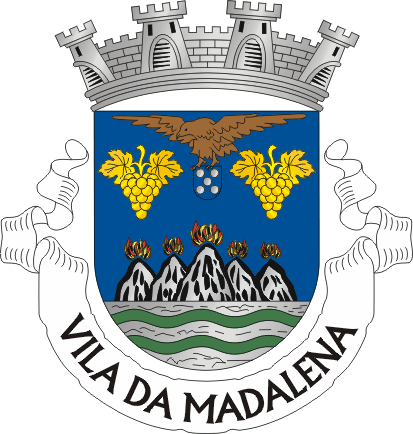
- Flag Coat of arms
- Interactive map of Madalena
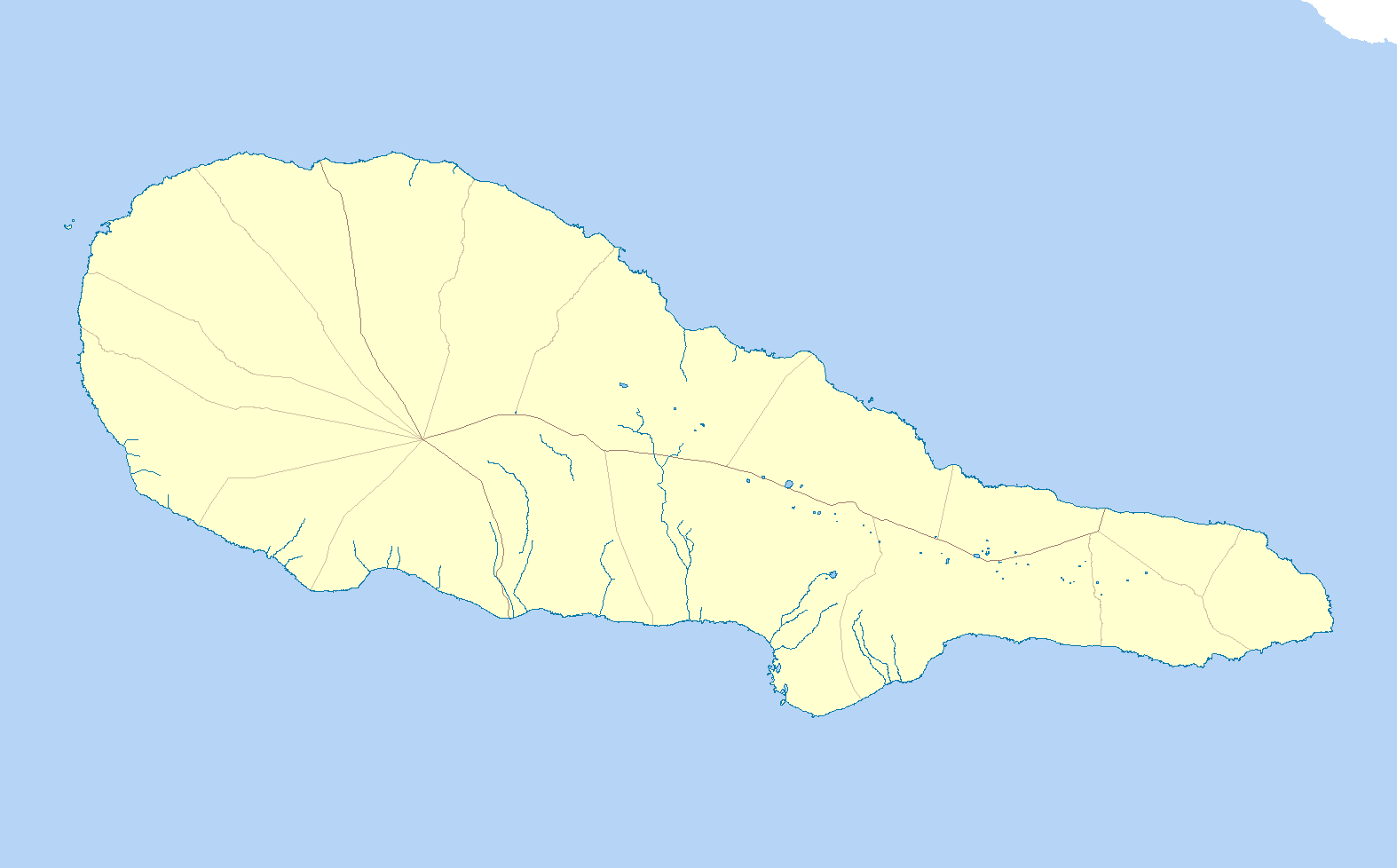
- Location in the Azores Madalena (Pico)
- Coordinates: 38°32′3″N 28°31′41″W
- Country: Portugal
- Auton. region: Azores
- Island: Pico
- Established: Settlement: fl. 1483; Municipality: 8 March 1723
- Parishes: 6

Government
  - President: José António Marcos Soares (PSD)

Area
  - Total: 147.12 km^{2} (56.80 sq mi)
- Highest elevation: 2,351 m (7,713 ft)
- Lowest elevation: 0 m (0 ft)

Population (2021)
  - Total: 6,332 ▲
  - Density: 43.04/km^{2} (111.5/sq mi)
- Time zone: UTC−01:00 (AZOT)
  - Summer (DST): UTC+00:00 (AZOST)
- Postal code: 9950-324
- Area code: 292
- Patron: Santa Maria Madalena
- Website: http://www.cm-madalena.pt/

UNESCO World Heritage Site

UNESCO World Heritage Site
- Official name: Landscape of the Pico Island Vineyard Culture
- Criteria: (iii) (v)
- Reference: 1117
- Inscription: 2004 (28th Session)

Madalena (Portuguese pronunciation: [mɐðɐˈlenɐ]) is a municipality along the western coast of the island of Pico, in the Portuguese Azores. It has 6,332 inhabitants as of 2021, in an area of 147.12 km^{2}. The municipality is fronted by the stratovolcano Pico in the eastern frontier, and the Faial Channel which divides Pico from the island of Faial seven kilometers away. It is made up of six freguesias (civil parishes) and is encircled almost entirely by the Atlantic Ocean except in the east, where it is bordered by the two remaining municipalities on the island: Lajes do Pico to the southeast, and São Roque do Pico to the northeast.

== History ==
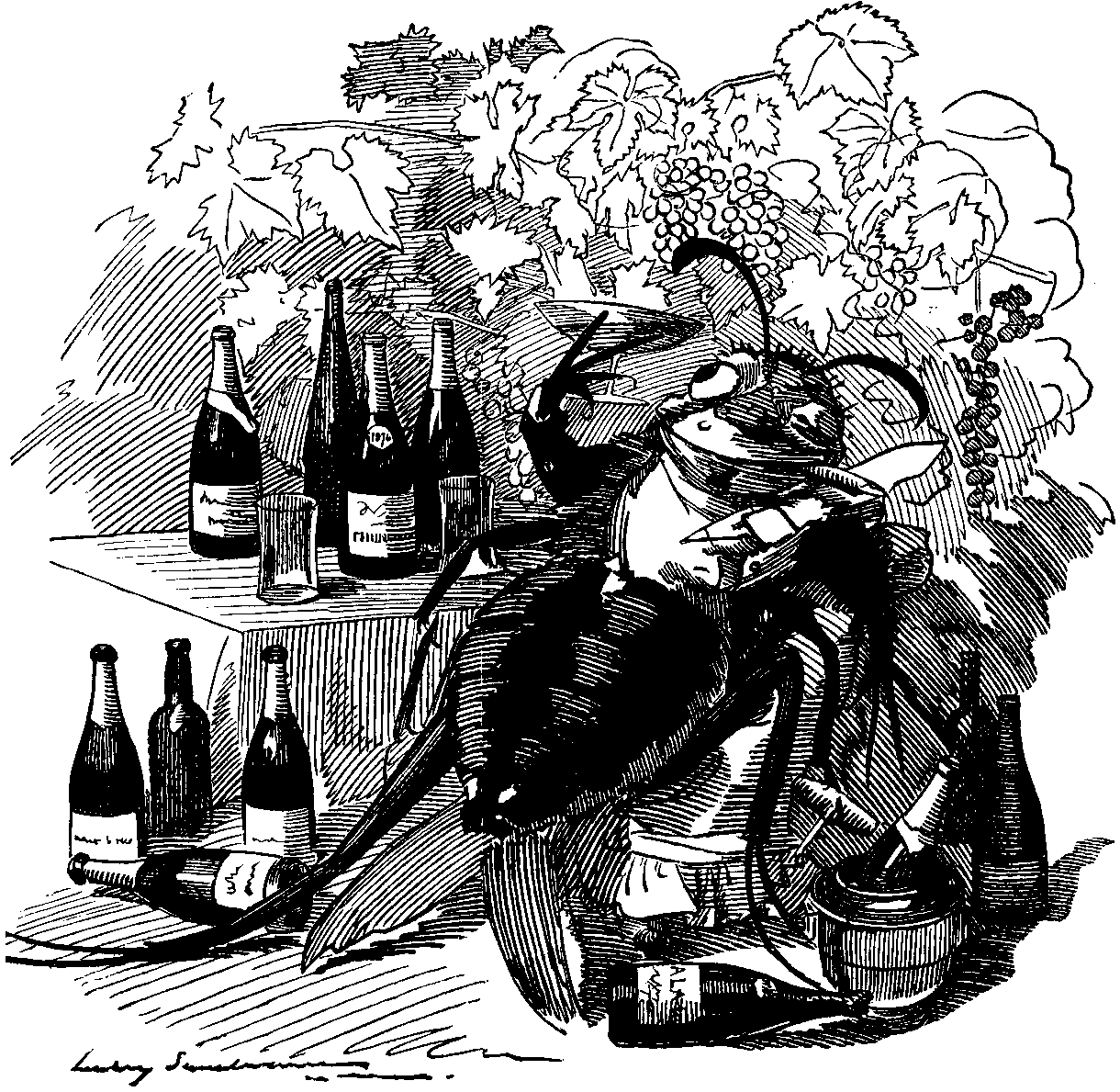
The phylloxera, a true gourmet, responsible for the destruction of the vineyards in the 19th century (Cartoon from Punch, September 6, 1890)

The settlement of the island of Pico occurred much later than most islands, partly due to greater interest shown in the other islands of the Central Group. For a time, only small herds, deposited by property-owners from Faial and Terceira, along with their caretakers (some of whom were slaves), were the only inhabitants of the island. It was not until the Infanta Beatriz proceeded to reorganize island administration and promote a greater colonization of the islands of the Central Group (between 1470 and 1480) that this changed. In 1483, Faial and Pico were integrated into one Captaincy, under the Fleming Josse van Huerter, and settlers were encouraged to colonize the island of Pico. But even still, the area of Madalena, with its rocky coastal plain, did not attract many new settlers and the community did not expand significantly until the municipality was created in 1723.

By the first quarter of the 18th century, the municipality of Madalena was already entrenched in the "wine cycle" which had multiplied the riches of its landowners and increased the desire of local settlers for emancipation from the Captaincy of Faial. The introduction of grapes to the island had occurred almost immediately with the first settlers, along with the cultivation of wheat and production of wine and olive oil (that were staples of the traditional Mediterranean Christian culture at the time). In the 15th and 16th century, the vineyards had been a source of subsistence, then export, because the soils and rocky terrain had made it almost impossible to develop a viable cereal culture. The diffusion of vineyards, that began in the 17th century, was a consequence of the soil and the conquest of markets for Pico's verdelho wines. The uniquely Piquense culture of grape growing on the ground, or in volcanic rock patches, allowed the establishment of an industry and opened new markets for products originating in Madalena.

In the second half of the 17th century, the collapse of the woad industry, which supported many of the Azorean islands, and the decline of Iberian hegemony (Portugal was in a dynastic union with Spain at the time) in the North America, created a syndrome of crisis on the islands. The growth in viticulture onto better quality soils allowed an improvement of the castes, and a growth in the reputation and credibility of Piquense wines. In addition, new markets in North America and Brazil improved exports, which had primarily relied on English patronage and purchases.

The growth of wine exports from Pico elevated the neighboring town of Horta to the status of municipality, since all international shipments were made from the island's sheltered port, creating a socio-economic disparity between the disenfranchised Piquense "workers" and the entrepreneurs/landowners from Faial. Along with a demographic growth on Madalena, this shift raised cries for the emancipation of Madalena and the island of Pico. In fact, Father Gaspar Frutuoso and Friar Agostinho de Montalverne certified that the colonists in Madalena had tripled by the 17th century; in 1587, there were less than 3000 inhabitants and around 9000 by 1695, forcing the remodelling of the local church. Pico moved "up the ladder" of urban hierarchies from fifth largest centre in the Azores to fourth, behind São Miguel, Terceira and Faial. By the middle of the 18th century, the population was over 19000 inhabitants. The municipality was created on March 8, 1723.

In 1793, and between 1800 and 1802, Madalena contributed to 80% of the domestic sales on the island of Pico, primarily from brands of wines to markets in the New World, the Baltics, India and Macau. Until the early 19th century, exports were handled from Horta, where most of the mercantile fleets would make call (owing to its superior services and sheltered bay). But, the island's growth ultimately supported the construction of a sheltered anchorage in Madalena, that would become the port.

Yet, as Madalena became the predominant center on the island, it was hit by the phylloxera plague, which destroyed many of the vineyards and began a period of economic deprivation. A diversification of economic activities was the only way to resolve these problems and improve the situation. The fruit industry, and in particular the citrus orchards, became an important staple in the ports of Horta and Madalena. Whaling also developed, but it had its most profound effects in the communities that circled the island, yet not within the jurisdiction of Madalena.

In the 20th century, the dairy industry continued the boom and bust cycle, while ecotourism centered on Pico and the histo-cultural nature of the island developed after European integration.

== Geography ==
The municipality comprises the following six parishes:

- Bandeiras - A village connected with the prosperity of the "wine cycle" of the 18th and 19th centuries; principal areas of note: Cais do Mourato and Cachorro, both "resort towns", and where the latter is the location of a chapel known for a traditional penitential pilgrimage; and Cabeço Chão an area with a micro-climate.
- Candelária - A civil parish in an area of vineyards and orchards, birthplace of the late cardinal, Jose da Costa Nunes.
- Criação Velha - As its name in Portuguese means, the area of relatively older history, is still considered the true home of verdelho wine, where golden grapes ripen on large beds of lava, generally in the area of Lagido.
- Madalena - The trading and communications centre of the island; its position facing the great island of Faial (and the town of Horta) has made it, since its original settlement, the main port to ensure links with the neighbouring islands. It is bordered by the two islets that have (along with Mount Pico itself) been characteristic of the island of Pico: Ilhéu Deitado ("Lying Down Islet") and Ilhéu em Pe ("Standing Islet"). The area of Areia Larga is considered the summer resort of the settlement, location of the oldest manor-houses associated with the "wine cycle".
- São Caetano - Still referred to as Prainha do Sul ("Little Southern Beach") or Prainha do Galeao ("Little Beach of the Galleon", because of the ship built there by Garcia Gonçalves Madruga in the 16th century in order to pay debts owed to King João III), it includes the hamlet of Terra do Pao, and its small church dedicated to Saint Margaret.
- São Mateus - One of the oldest villages on the island, it was founded in 1482, as an alternative to the port of Madalena (connecting Pico with Faial), and as a base for whaling. It is also recognized for its lace-makers, who produce embroidery and crochet work.

=== Climate ===
Climate data for Madalena, 1977-1995, altitude 15 m (49 ft)
Month	Jan	Feb	Mar	Apr	May	Jun	Jul	Aug	Sep	Oct	Nov	Dec	Year
Average precipitation mm (inches)	88.0 (3.46)	119.0 (4.69)	88.8 (3.50)	73.2 (2.88)	62.6 (2.46)	42.6 (1.68)	29.6 (1.17)	52.6 (2.07)	84.8 (3.34)	108.9 (4.29)	147.8 (5.82)	126.1 (4.96)	1,024 (40.32)
Source: Portuguese Environmental Agency

== Notable people ==
- Caesar DePaço (born 1965), Portuguese businessman
