= Criação Velha =

- Civil parish
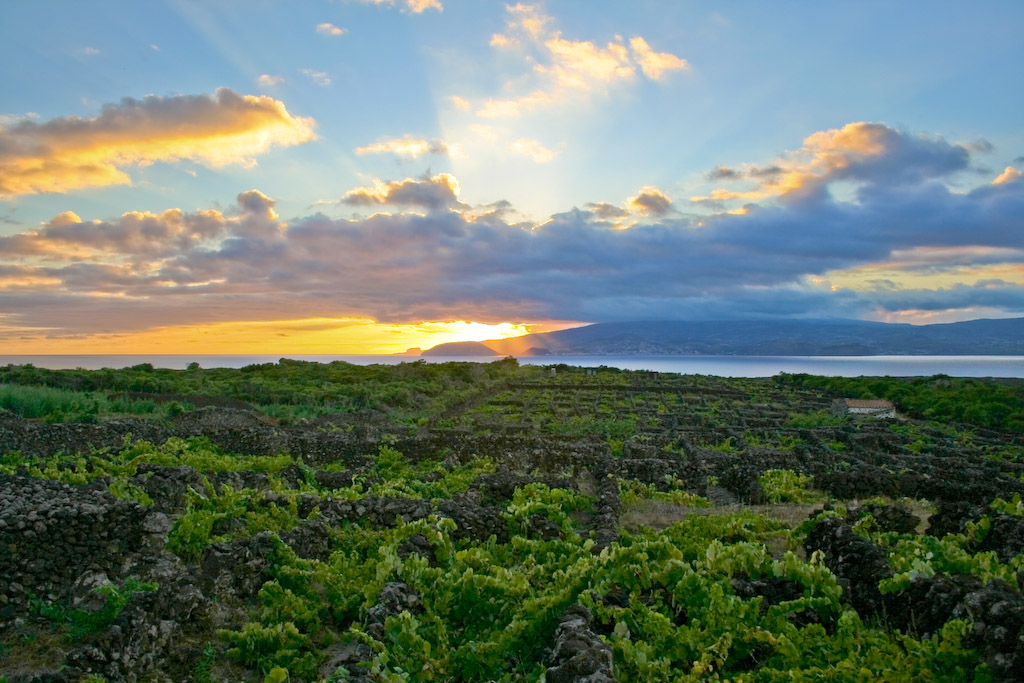
- The vineyard landscape of Criação Velha replaced cattle and the dairy industry, due to the quality of the Verdelho Wines produced from the island

- Location of Criação Velha within the municipality of Madalena, Pico Island
- Coordinates: 38°30′35″N 28°31′18″W
- Country: Portugal
- Auton. region: Azores
- Island: Pico
- Municipality: Madalena
- Established: Parish: 20 November 1799

Area
  - Total: 18.36 km^{2} (7.09 sq mi)
- Elevation: 76 m (249 ft)

Population (2011)
  - Total: 768
  - Density: 41.8/km^{2} (108/sq mi)
- Time zone: UTC−01:00 (AZOT)
  - Summer (DST): UTC+00:00 (AZOST)
- Postal code: 9950-232
- Area code: 292
- Patron: Nossa Senhora das Dores

Criação Velha (pronounced [kɾi.ɐ.ˈsɐ̃w ˈvɛ.ʎɐ]) is a civil parish in the municipality of Madalena on the island of Pico in the Azores. The population in 2011 was 768, in an area of 18.36 km^{2}. It contains the localities Alto da Cêrca, Canada de Beatriz, Canada de Pedro Nunes, Canada do Bacelo, Canada do Costa, Canada do Japão, Canada do Monte, João Lima, Lajidos, Rosário and Tapadas.

== History ==
Historical evidence, from the municipality of Madalena, relates that the name Criação Velha comes from an agricultural reference: it was an area where cattle (no distinction) were raised long ago. The term criação means "raising", and Velha is old, referring to historical records that the area was (and continues to be) important in this pursuit. Owing to the rich fertile lands the early settlers occupied most of their time with agriculture and wine production, slowly developing a commerce sector and industry later into its existence.

== Geography ==
The parish is located in the western coast of the municipality, sandwiched between the parishes of Madalena and Candelária; a pie-shaped wedge that extends just to the base of Ponte do Pico to an area of about 2.75 kilometers at its maximum width. Unlike the other parishes with the municipality of Madalena, Criação Velha's borders does not extend to the top of Pico (its limit stops about 2 kilometers from the summit of the stratovolcano). The area is relatively hilly, sloping gradually from forested parcels into an area of semi-cultivatable land and then scrub pasture-lands. Most practical farming occurs around the central parish, since the forested lands are dense and impractical. The area is recognized for a series of grottos, with about 5 kilometers of extensions, carved from the dykes and subterranean lava fields along the island's history.

== Sights ==
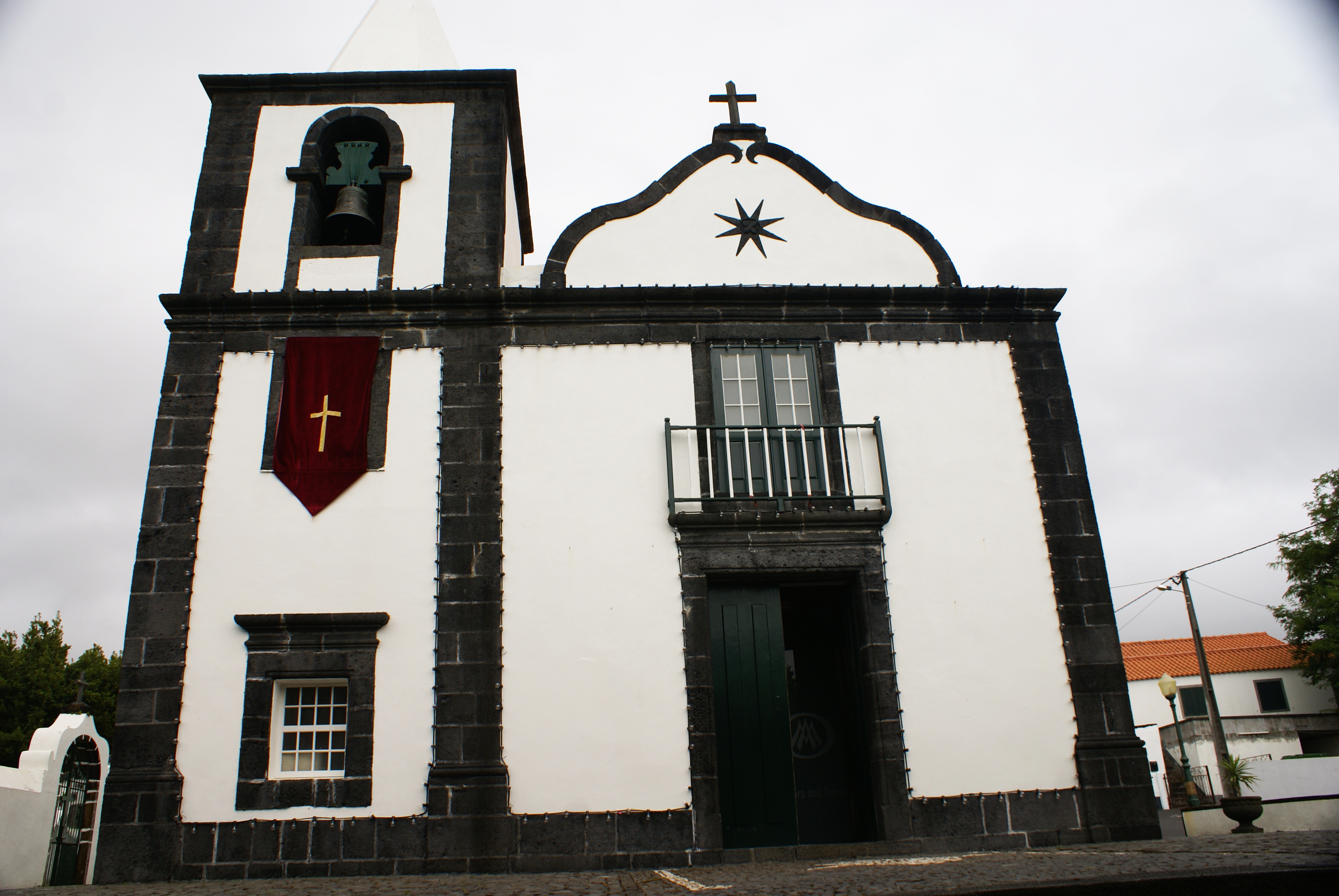
Parish church Igreja de Nossa Senhora das Dores

The parish church of Nossa Senhora das Dores consisting of only one nave was constructed in 1728. The church is united to the main street by a representative avenue consisting of plane trees. The Chapel of the Holy Spirit close to the church was built in 1902. In the village center several well-preserved residential buildings dating from the 19th and from the beginning of the 20th centuries can be seen.

The parish is surrounded by vineyards. The Landscape of the Pico Island Vineyard Culture was declared a Unesco World Heritage Site in 2004.
