= Portuguese people =

Ethnic group native to Portugal

Portuguese: Portugueses

Total population
- Portugal: 9,205,938

Regions with significant populations
- Brazil: c. 5,000,000 (includes Portuguese nationals and their descendants down to the third generation; excludes more distant ancestry)
- France: 2,577,000 (Portuguese born & ancestry) – 3,000,000
- United States: 1,400,000 (Portuguese ancestry)
- Canada: 400,000 – 471,810 (Portuguese ancestry)
- Venezuela: 300,000(The official data Portuguese born & ancestry 2024) – 400,000(ancestry 2019) (1,300,000 Ancestry Upper Estimate 2019) (49,104 citizens in 2024)
- Switzerland: 203 696 – 265,272
- Angola: 200,000 (114,768 citizens)
- Mozambique: 200,000 (42,008 citizens)
- Chile: 200,000
- Spain: 184,774
- United Kingdom: 170,000
- Macau: 152,616
- Luxembourg: 151,028
- Germany: 115 165 – 244,217
- Myanmar: 100,000 (Bayingyi)
- India: 80,654
- Belgium: 80,000
- Australia: 73,903
- Argentina: 42,000
- Sri Lanka: 40,000 (Burgher)
- Malaysia: 40,000 (Kristang)
- Netherlands: 35,633
- Cape Verde: 22,318 (ancestry)
- Timor-Leste: 20,853
- Hong Kong: 20,700
- Singapore: 17,000
- Andorra: 16,308
- Bermuda: 16,000 (ancestry) (1,643 Portuguese born)
- Jersey: 15,000
- Guinea-Bissau: 10,400
- Ireland: 9,542
- Norway: 9,000
- Italy: 8,288
- Saudi Arabia: 7,971
- Austria: 7,245
- Russia: 4,945
- Saint Barthélemy: 3,000 (Portuguese born)
- French Guiana: 3,000 (Portuguese born & ancestry)

Languages
- Portuguese, Portuguese Sign Language(LGP)

Religion
- Predominantly Roman Catholic

Related ethnic groups
- Other Romance-speaking peoples Especially Galicians, Mirandese, Spaniards, Northern Italians, Southern French, and other Lusophones
- ^a Total number of ethnic Portuguese varies wildly based on the definition.

The Portuguese people (Portuguese: Portugueses generic plural, Português (male), or Portuguesa(s) (female(s)) are a Romance ethnic group and nation indigenous to Portugal, a country that occupies the west side of the Iberian Peninsula in south-west Europe, who share culture, ancestry and language.

The Portuguese state began with the founding of the County of Portugal in 868. Following the Battle of São Mamede (1128), Portugal gained international recognition as a kingdom through the Treaty of Zamora (1143) and the papal bull Manifestis Probatum (1179). This Portuguese state paved the way for the Portuguese people to unite as a nation.

The Portuguese explored distant lands previously unknown to Europeans—in the Americas, Africa, Asia and Oceania (southwest Pacific Ocean). Starting in 1415, with the conquest of Ceuta, the Portuguese took a significant role in the Age of Discovery, which culminated in a colonial empire. It was one of the first global empires and one of the world's major economic, political and military powers in the 15th and 16th centuries, with territories that became part of numerous countries. Portugal helped to launch the spread of Western civilization to other geographies.

During and after the period of the Portuguese Empire, the Portuguese diaspora spread across the world.

== Ancestry ==
The Portuguese people's heritage largely derives from the Indo-European (Lusitanians, Conii), and Celtic peoples (Gallaecians, Turduli and Celtici). They were later Romanized after the Roman conquest. The Portuguese language–the native language of the overwhelming majority of Portuguese people–stems from Vulgar Latin.

A number of male Portuguese lineages descend from Germanic tribes who arrived as ruling elites after the Roman period, starting in 409. These included the Suebi, Buri, Hasdingi Vandals and Visigoths. The pastoral North Caucasus' Alans left traces in a few central-southern areas (e.g. Alenquer, from "Alen Kerke" or "Temple of the Alans").

The Umayyad conquest of Iberia, between the early 8th century until the 12th century, also left small Moorish, Jewish and Saqaliba genetic contributions.

Other minor influences include Viking settlements between the 9th and 11th centuries, made by Norsemen who raided coastal areas mainly in the northern regions of Douro and Minho. Low-incidence, pre-Roman influence came from Phoenicians and Greeks in southern coastal areas.

== Name ==
The name Portugal is a portmanteau that comes from the Latin word Portus (meaning port) and a second word Cale, whose meaning and origin are unclear. Cale is probably a reminder of the Gallaeci (also known as Callaeci), a Celtic tribe that lived in part of Northern Portugal.

Alternatively the name may have come from the early settlement of Cale (today's Gaia), situated on the mouth of the Douro River on the Atlantic coast (Portus Cale). The name Cale seems to come from the Celts – perhaps from one of their specifications, Cailleach – but which, in everyday life, was synonymous with shelter, anchorage or door. Among other theories, some suggest that Cale may stem from the Greek word for kalós (beautiful). Another theory for Portugal postulates a French derivation, Portus Gallus "port of the Gauls".

During the Middle Ages, the area around Cale became known through the Visigoths as Portucale. Portucale could have evolved in the 7th and 8th centuries, to become Portugale, or Portugal, from the 9th century. The term denoted the area between the Douro and Minho rivers.

== Early inhabitants ==
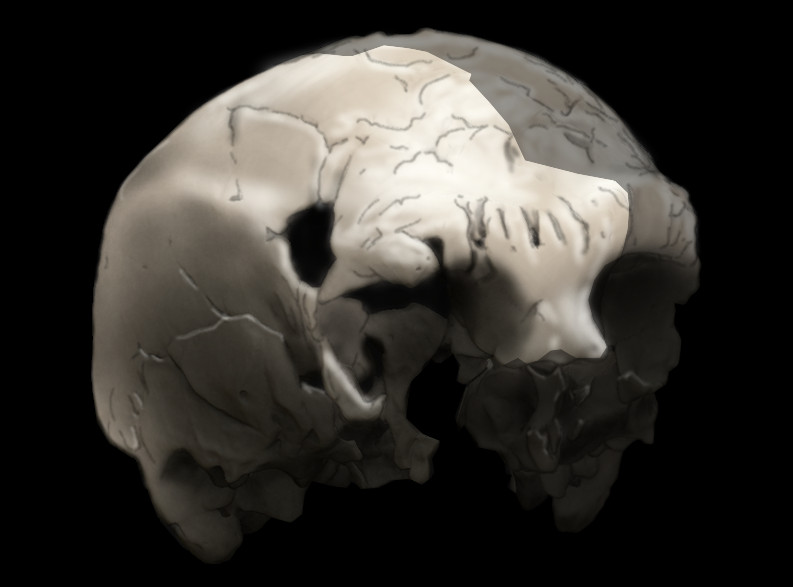
Aroeira 3 skull of 400,000-year-old Homo heidelbergensis found in 2014. The oldest trace of human history in Portugal

Portuguese origins are predominantly from Southern and Western Europe. The earliest modern humans inhabiting Portugal are believed to have arrived in the Iberian Peninsula 35,000 to 40,000 years ago. Y-chromosome and mtDNA data suggest that modern Portuguese trace a proportion of these lineages to the Paleolithic peoples who began settling the European continent at the end of the last glaciation around 45,000 years ago.

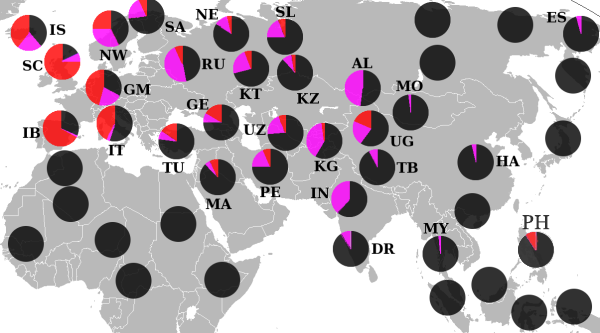
Distribution of R1a (purple) and R1b (red). See also this map for distribution in Europe.

Northern Iberia is believed to have been a major Ice age refuge from which Paleolithic humans later colonized Europe. Migrations from northern Iberia during the Paleolithic and Mesolithic link modern Iberians to much of Western Europe, particularly the British Isles and Atlantic Europe.

Y-chromosome haplogroup R1b is the most common haplogroup in the Iberian peninsula and western Europe. One of the best-characterized of Iberian haplotypes is the Atlantic Modal Haplotype (AMH). This haplotype reaches the highest frequencies there and in the British Isles. In Portugal it reckons generally 65% in the South, ranging from 87-96% northwards.

=== Neolithic ===
The Neolithic colonization of Europe from Western Asia and the Middle East, beginning around 10,000 years ago, reached Iberia after reaching the rest of the continent. According to the demic diffusion model its impact was greatest in the southern and eastern regions.

=== Celts and Indo-Europeans ===
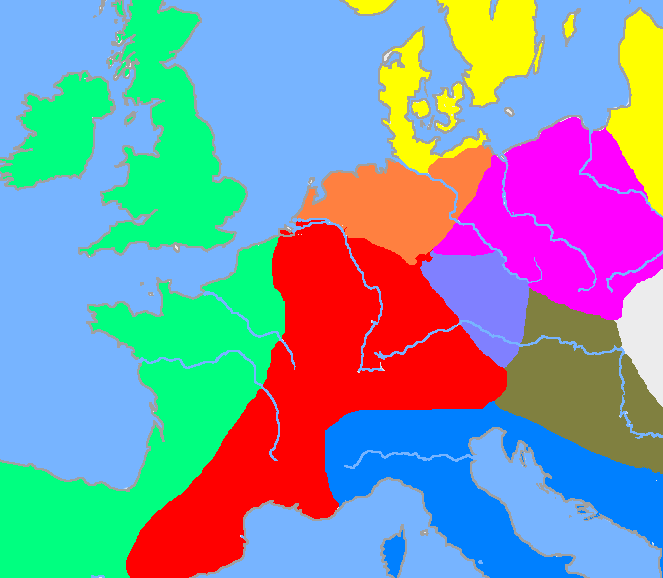
A simplified map of archaeological cultures of the late Bronze Age (c. 1200 BC): Terramare culture central Urnfield culture northern Urnfield culture Lusatian culture (in central Europe) Knovíz culture Danubian culture Atlantic Bronze Age Nordic Bronze Age

In the 3rd millennium BC, during the Bronze Age, the first wave of migrations by Indo-European language speakers into Iberia occurred. The expansion of haplogroup R1b in Western Europe, most common in many areas of Atlantic Europe, was primarily due to massive migrations from the Pontic–Caspian steppe of Eastern Europe during the Bronze Age, along with carriers of Indo-European languages like proto-Celtic and proto-Italic. Unlike older studies on uniparental markers, large amounts of autosomal DNA were analyzed in addition to paternal Y-DNA. An autosomal component was detected in modern Europeans that was not present in the Neolithic or Mesolithic, and which entered Europe with paternal lineages R1b and R1a, as well as the Indo-European languages.

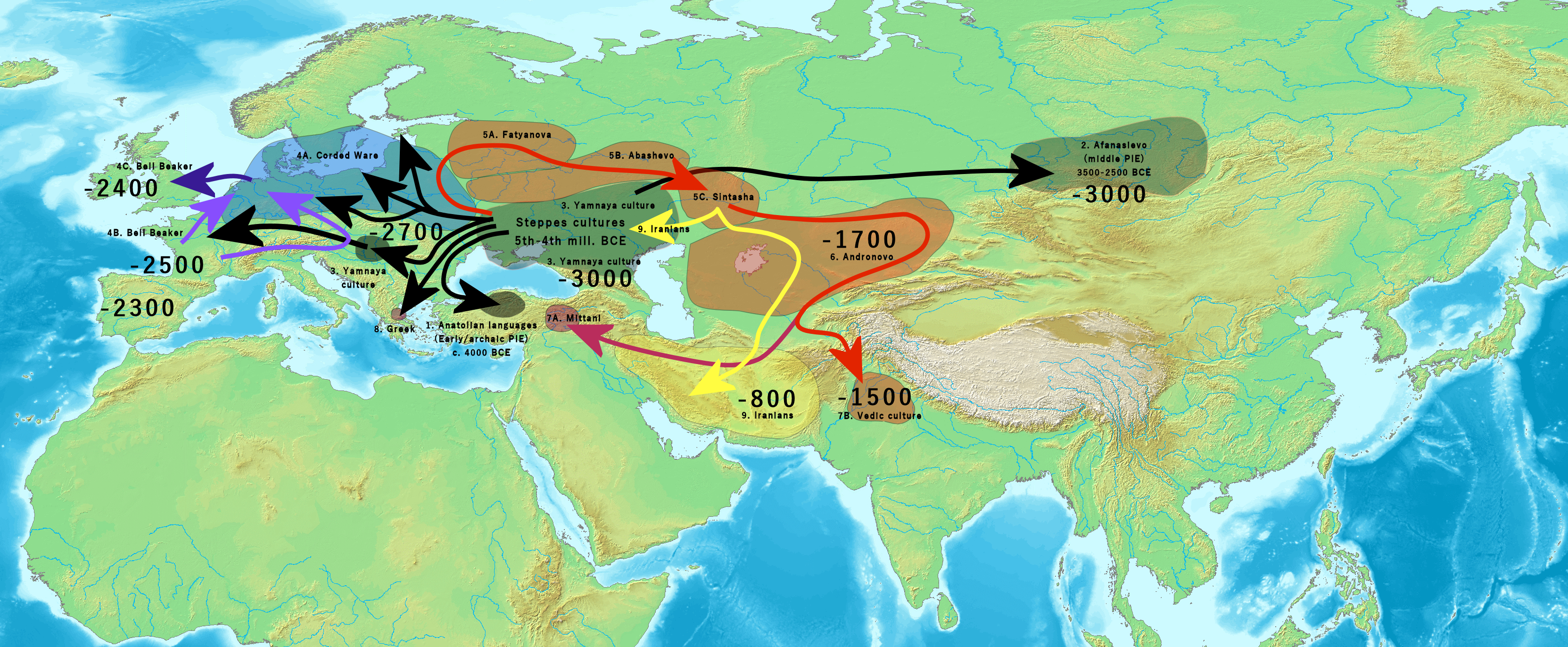
Indo-European migrations

The first immigrations of Indo-European language speakers were followed by waves of Celts. The Celts arrived in Portugal about 3,000 years ago. Migration was particularly intense from the 7th to the 5th centuries BC.

These two processes defined Iberia's cultural landscape "Continental in the northwest and Mediterranean towards the southeast", as historian José Mattoso described.

The northwest–southeast cultural shift also shows in genetic differences: based on 2016 findings, haplogroup H, a cluster within the haplogroup R category, is more prevalent along the Atlantic façade, including the Cantabrian Coast and Portugal. Its highest frequency is in Galicia (northwestern corner of Iberia). The frequency of haplogroup H shows a decreasing trend from the Atlantic façade toward the Mediterranean.

This finding adds strong evidence that Galicia and Northern Portugal was a cul-de-sac population, a kind of European edge for a major ancient central European migration. An interesting pattern of genetic continuity exists along the Cantabria coast and Portugal, a pattern observed previously when minor sub-clades of the mtDNA phylogeny were examined.

Given the Paleolithic and Neolithic origins, as well as Bronze Age and Iron Age Indo-European migrations, the Portuguese ethnic origin was mainly a mixture of pre-Celts or para-Celts, such as the Lusitanians of Lusitania, and Celtic peoples such as Gallaeci of Gallaecia, the Celtici and the Cynetes of Alentejo and the Algarve.

== Pre-Roman populations ==
=== Lusitanians ===
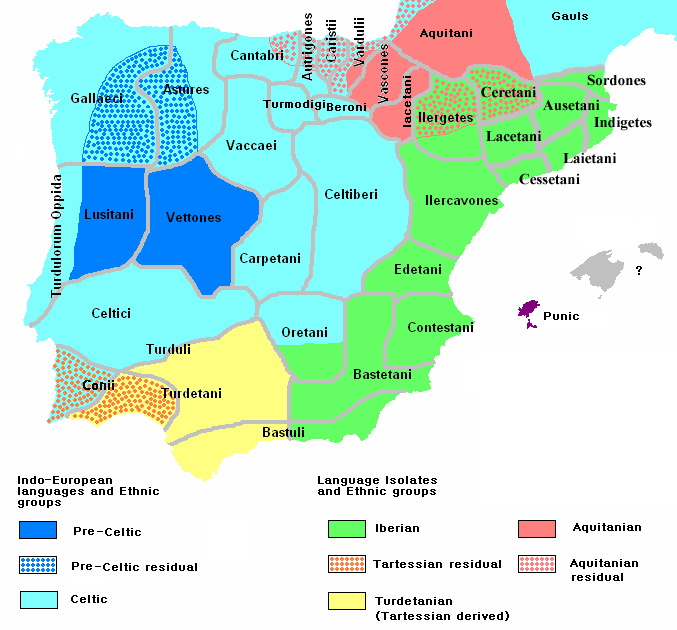
Ethnographic and Linguistic Map of the Iberian Peninsula at about 200 BC.

The Lusitanians (or Lusitānus – singular – Lusitani – plural – in Latin) were an Indo-European people living in the Western Iberian Peninsula long before it became the Roman province of Lusitania (modern Portugal, Extremadura and part of Salamanca). They spoke Lusitanian, of which only a few short written fragments survive. Most Portuguese consider Lusitanians as their ancestors, although the northern regions (Minho, Douro, Trás-os-Montes) identify more with Gallaecians. Linguists such as Ellis Evans claimed that Gallaecian-Lusitanian was one language (thus not separate languages) of the "p" Celtic variant. They were a large tribe who lived between Douro and Tagus rivers.

The Lusitanians may have originated in the Alps and settled in the region in the 6th century BC. Scholars such as Dáithí Ó hÓgáin consider them to be indigenous. He claimed they were initially dominated by the Celts, before gaining full independence. Romanian archaeologist Scarlat Lambrino, active in Portugal for many years, proposed that they were originally a tribal Celtic group, related to the Lusones.

The first area settled by the Lusitanians was probably the Douro Valley and the region of Beira Alta; they subsequently moved south, and expanded on both sides of the Tagus river, before the Roman conquest.

The Lusitanians originated from either Proto-Celtic or Proto-Italic populations who spread from Central Europe into western Europe after Yamnaya migrations into the Danube Valley, while Proto-Germanic and Proto-Balto-Slavic may have developed east of the Carpathian Mountains, in present-day Ukraine, moving north and spreading with the Corded Ware culture in Middle Europe (third millennium BCE). One theory claimed that a European branch of Indo-European dialects, termed "North-west Indo-European" and associated with the Bell Beaker culture, may have been ancestral to Celtic, Italic, Germanic, and Balto-Slavic lanaguages.

The Lusitanians' Celtic root, is further emphasized by research by the Max Planck Institute on the origins of Indo-European languages. One study identified one common Celtic branch of peoples and languages spanning most of Atlantic Europe, including Lusitania, at around 7,000 BC. This work contradicts previous theories that excluded Lusitanian from the Celtic linguistic family.

In Roman times, the Roman province of Lusitania was extended north of the areas occupied by the Lusitanians to include the territories of Asturias and Gallaecia, but these were soon ceded to the jurisdiction of the Provincia Tarraconensis in the north, while the south remained the Provincia Lusitania et Vettones. After this, Lusitania's northern border was along the Douro river, while its eastern border passed through Salmantica and Caesarobriga to the Anas (Guadiana) river.

=== Other Pre-Roman groups ===
Map showing the main pre-Roman tribes in Portugal and their main migrations. Turduli movement in red, Celtici in brown and Lusitanian in a blue colour. Most tribes neighbouring the Lusitanians were dependent on them. Names are in Latin.

As the Lusitanians fought the Romans, the name Lusitania was adopted by the Gallaeci, tribes living north of the Douro, and other surrounding tribes, eventually spreading as a label to the nearby peoples fighting Roman rule in western Iberia. This led the Romans to name their original province in the area, which initially covered the entire western side of the Iberian peninsula, Lusitania.

List of the tribes living in "Portugal" prior to Roman rule:
Tribes	Description
Bardili (Turduli)	living in the Setúbal peninsula;
Bracari	living between the rivers Tâmega and Cávado, in the area of the modern city of Braga;
Callaici	living along and north of the Douro;
Celtici	Celts living in Alentejo;
Coelerni	living in the mountains between the rivers Tua and Sabor;
Cynetes or Conii	living in the Algarve and the south of Alentejo;
Equaesi	living in the most mountainous region of modern Portugal;
Grovii	a mysterious tribe living in the Minho valley;
Interamici	living in Trás-os-Montes and in the border areas with Galicia and León (in modern Spain);
Leuni	living between the rivers Lima and Minho;
Luanqui	living between the rivers Tâmega and Tua;
Limici	living in the swamps of the river Lima, on the border between Portugal and Galicia;
Narbasi	living in the north of modern Portugal (interior) and nearby area of southern Galicia;
Nemetati	living north of the Douro Valley in the area of Mondim;
Oestriminis	also referred to as Sefes and supposedly linked to the Cempsii. There is not a consensus regarding their exact origins and location. They are believed to have been the first known humans to inhabit the whole Atlantic margin covering Portugal and Galicia, the people from Finis terrae at the end of the Western world.
Paesuri	a dependent tribe of the Lusitanians, living between the rivers Douro and Vouga;
Quaquerni	living in the mountains at the mouths of rivers Cávado and Tâmega;
Seurbi	living between the rivers Cávado and Lima (or even reaching the river Minho);
Tamagani	from the area of Chaves, near the river Tâmega;
Tapoli	another dependent tribe of the Lusitanians, living north of the river Tagus, on the border between modern Portugal and Spain;
Turdetani	In southern municipalities such as São Brás de Alportel
Turduli	in the east of Alentejo (Guadiana Valley);
Turduli Veteres	literally "ancient Turduli", living south of the estuary of the river Douro;
Turdulorum Oppida	Turduli living in the Portuguese region of Estremadura and Beira Litoral;
Turodi	living in Trás-os-Montes and bordering areas of Galicia;
Vettones	living in the eastern border areas of Portugal, and in Spanish provinces of Ávila and Salamanca, as well as parts of Zamora, Toledo and Cáceres;
Zoelae	living in the mountains of Serra da Nogueira, Sanabria and Culebra, up to the mountains of Mogadouro in northern Portugal and adjacent areas of Galicia.

== Romanization ==
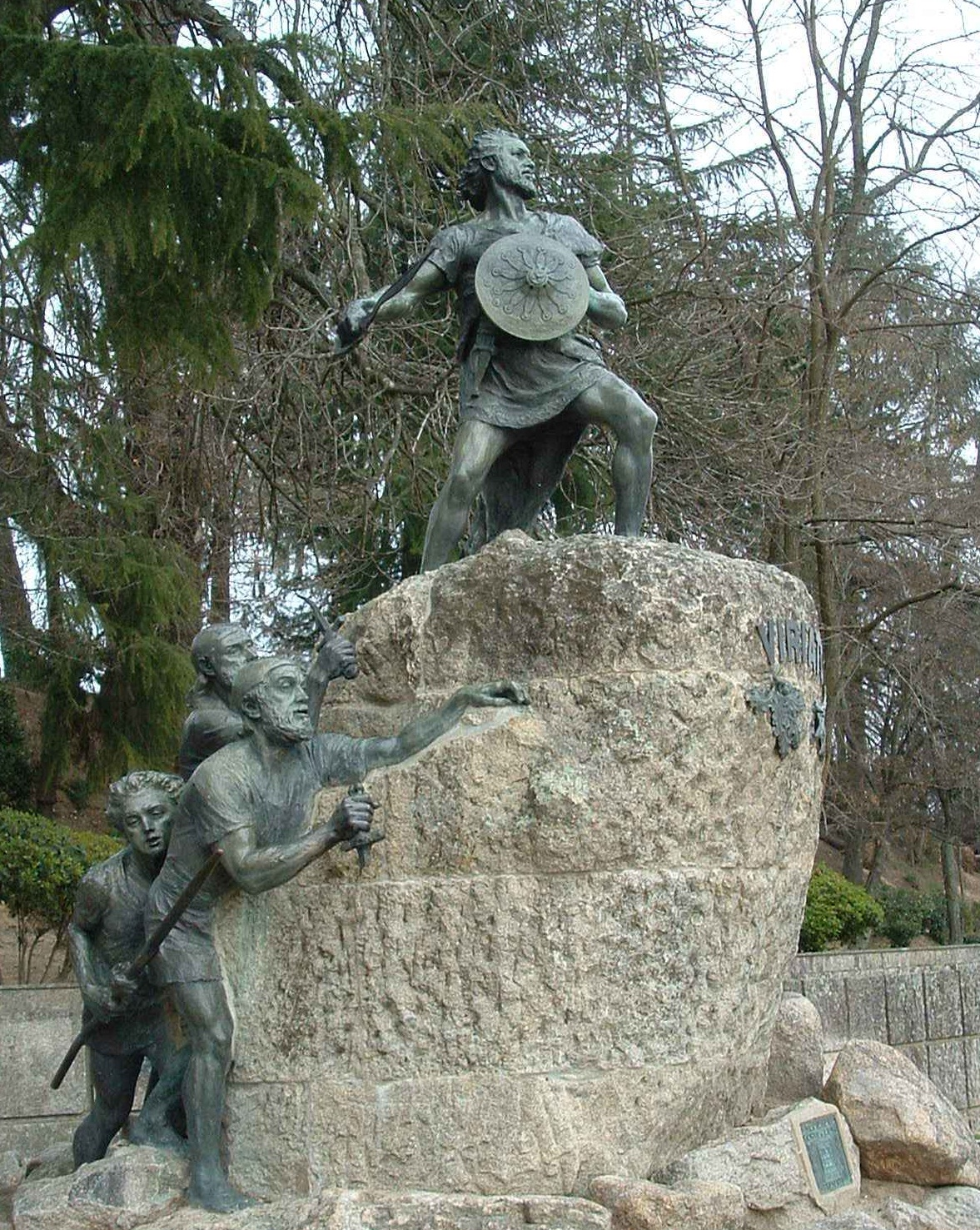
Viriato (179 – 139 BC), led a guerilla war against the Romans for eight years. He was beheaded by traitors from his ranks, who killed him in his sleep for a bribe. The statue depicted is in Viseu.

Rome conquered the peninsula during the 2nd and 1st centuries B.C. from Carthage during the Punic Wars.

After 193 B.C., the Lusitanians fought Rome's expansion peninsula following the defeat and occupation of Carthage in North Africa. They fought for years, repeatedly defeating the Roman invaders. In the end they were punished by Praetor Servius Galba in 150 B.C. He killed 9,000 Lusitanians and later sold 20,000 more as slaves to the Roman provinces in Gaul (modern France).

Three years later (147 B.C.), Viriathus became the leader of the Lusitanians and attacked Roman rule in Lusitania and beyond. He commanded a confederation of Celtic tribes and prevented Roman expansion with guerrilla warfare. In 139 B.C. Viriathus was betrayed and killed in his sleep by his companions (emissaries to the Romans), Audax, Ditalcus and Minurus, bribed by Marcus Popillius Laenas. However, when Audax, Ditalcus and Minurus returned to receive their reward, Consul Quintus Servilius Caepio ordered their execution, declaring, "Rome does not pay traitors". Viriathus was the first Portuguese 'national hero'. After Viriathus' rule, the celticized Lusitanians largely adopted romanized culture and the Latin language.

Lusitanian inhabitants, following the rest of the Roman-Iberian peninsula, eventually gained the status of "Citizens of Rome". Many saints emerged from the territory. These include Saint Engrácia, Saint Quitéria, and Saint Marina of Aguas Santas.

The Romans impacted the population, both genetically and culturally; the Portuguese language derives mostly from Latin, mostly a later evolution of the Roman language after the fall of the Western Roman Empire.

A 1949 study by the Italian-American linguist Mario Pei, analyzing the degree to which Portuguese and six other Romance languages diverged from Classical Latin with respect to their accent vocalization, yielded the following measurements of divergence—with higher percentages indicating greater divergence from the stressed vowels of Classical Latin—placing Portuguese toward the innovative end of the spectrum in this respect:

- Logudorese Sardinian: 8%
- Italian: 12%
- Spanish: 20%
- Romanian: 23.5%
- Occitan: 25%
- Portuguese: 31%
- French: 44%

The study emphasized, however, that it represented only "a very elementary, incomplete and tentative demonstration" of how statistical methods could measure linguistic change, assigned "frankly arbitrary" point values to various types of change, and did not compare languages in the sample with respect to any characteristics or forms of divergence other than stressed vowels, among other caveats.

The Roman domination of Portugal lasted from the 2nd century BC to the 5th century AD.

== Middle Ages ==
The Reconquista Timetable and expulsion of the Moors.

After the Romans, Germanic peoples, namely the Suebi, the Buri, and the Visigoths (an estimated 2–3% of the population), ruled the peninsula for centuries and assimilated into the local population. Some of the Vandals (Silingi and Hasdingi) and Alans lingered. The Suebians were the most numerous Germanic tribes. Portugal and Galicia, (along with Catalonia which was part of the Frankish Kingdom), are the regions with the highest ratios of Germanic Y-DNA.

Other influences include small Viking settlements between the 9th and 11th centuries, made by Norsemen who raided coastal areas mainly in Douro and Minho.

The Moors occupied what is now Portugal from the 8th century until the Reconquista movement expelled them in 1249. Some 2.000 of their population, mainly Berbers and Christian Jews became New Christians (Cristãos novos); some descendants of these people are still identifiable by their new surnames. Several genetic studies, including the most comprehensive genome-wide studies published on historical and modern populations of the Iberian Peninsula, conclude that the Moorish occupation left few to no Jewish, Arab and Berber genetic influences throughout Iberia, with higher incidence in the south and west, and lower incidence in the northeast, and almost none in Basque Country.

Following the end of the Reconquista and the Conquest of Faro, religious and ethnic minorities such as the so-called "new Christians" or the "Ciganos" (Roma gypsies) later suffered persecution from the state and the Inquisition. As a consequence, many were expelled, condemned, and subjected to auto-da-fé, or fled the country, creating a Jewish diaspora in the Netherlands, England, US, Brazil, Balkans, and beyond.

== County of Portugal ==
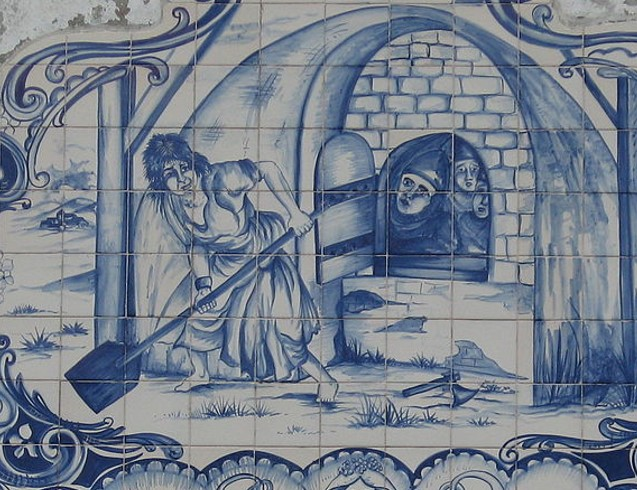
Azulejo tile image of Brites de Almeida killing Castilian soldiers

The political origin of the Portuguese state is in the founding of County of Portugal in 868 (Portuguese: Condado Portucalense; in period documents the name used was Portugalia). It was the first time that a cohesive nationalism emerged there, as even during the Roman Era, the indigenous populations were from diverse ethnic and cultural backgrounds.

Although the country began as a county, after the Battle of São Mamede on 24 June 1128 Portugal was officially recognised as a kingdom via the Treaty of Zamora and the papal bull Manifestis Probatum of Pope Alexander III. The establishment of the Portuguese state in the 12th century led the Portuguese to group together as a nation.

A subsequent turning point in Portuguese nationalism was the Battle of Aljubarrota in 1385, linked to Brites de Almeida, thereby putting an end to Castilian ambitions to take over the Portuguese throne.

== Genetic comparisons ==
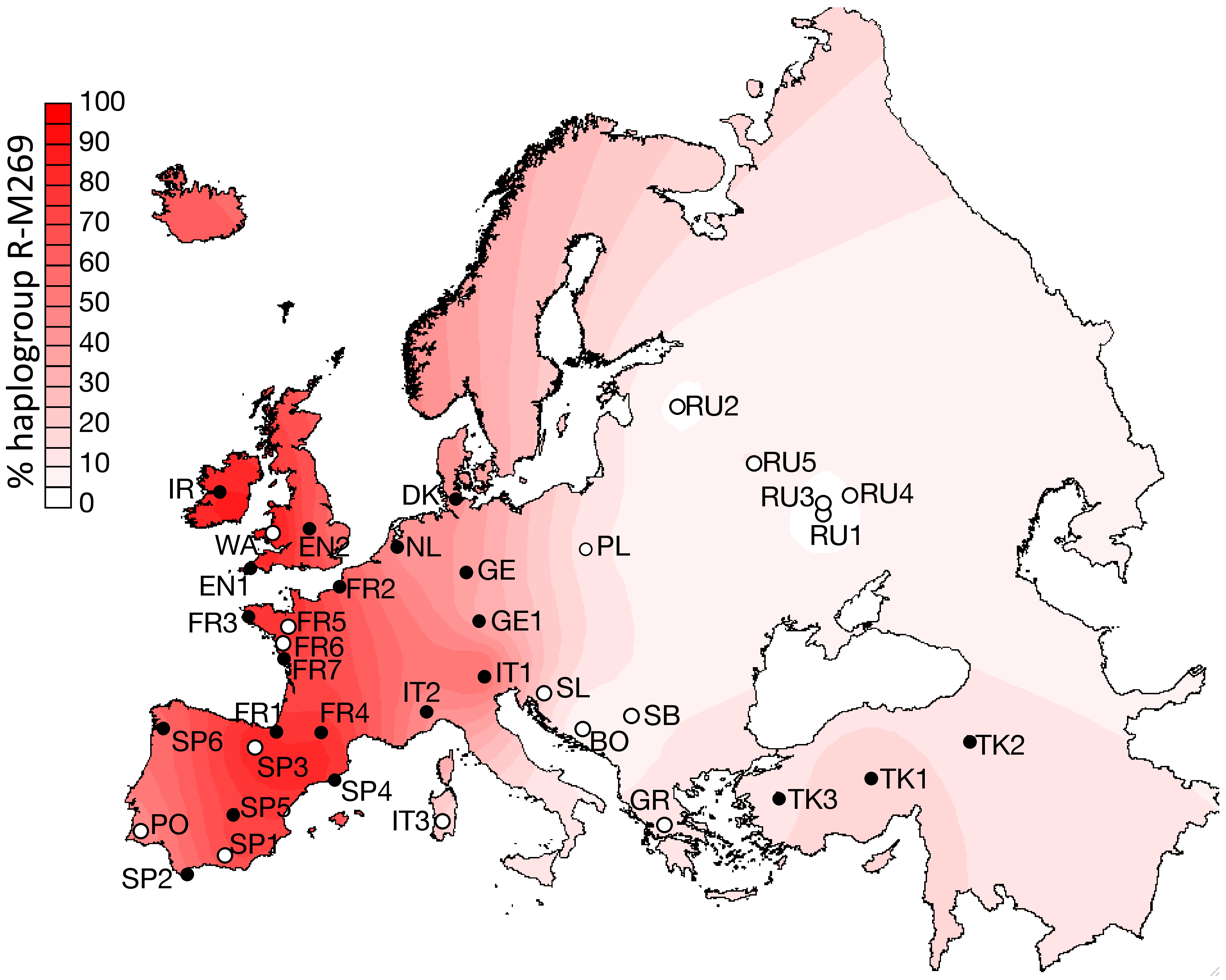
Geographical distribution of Haplogroup R1b (Y-DNA), R1b1a1a2 (R-M269)

The Portuguese share some DNA with the Basques. The results of the present HLA study in Portuguese populations show that they have features in common with Basques and some Madrid-area Spaniards: a high frequency of the HLA-haplotypes A29-B44-DR7 (ancient Western Europeans) and A1-B8-DR3 are common characteristics. Many Portuguese and Basques do not show the Mediterranean A33-B14-DR1 haplotype, confirming a lower admixture with Mediterraneans.

The Portuguese have one unique characteristic: a high frequency of HLA-A25-B18-DR15 and A26-B38-DR13, which may reflect a founder effect from ancient Portuguese, i.e., Oestriminis and Cynetes. According to an early genetic study, the Portuguese are a relatively distinct population according to HLA data, as they have a high frequency of the HLA-A25-B18-DR15 and A26-B38-DR13 genes, the latter is a unique Portuguese marker. In Europe, the A25-B18-DR15 gene is found only in Portugal; it also observed in some North Americans and in Brazilians (very likely of Portuguese ancestry). However, a fact-checking article from Portuguse news website disputes this claim about the Portuguese-only gene.

The pan-European haplotype A1-B8-DR3 and the western-European haplotype A29-B44-DR7 are shared by Portuguese, Basques, and Spaniards. The latter is also common in Irish, southern English, and western French populations.

Men from mainland Portugal, the Azores and Madeira belonged to 78–83% of the "Western European" haplogroup R1b, and Mediterranean J and E3b.

The comparative table shows statistics by haplogroups of Portuguese men with men of European countries, and communities.

Country/Haplogroup	I1	I2*/I2a	I2b	R1a	R1b	G	J2	J*/J1	E1b1b	T	Q	N
Portugal	2	1.5	3	1.5	56	6.5	9.5	3	14	2.5	0.5	0
France	8.5	3	3.5	3	58.5	5.5	6	1.5	7.5	1	0.5	0
United Kingdom	8	1	4.5	0.5	80	2	2.5	0.5	0.5	0	0	0
Germany	16	1.5	4.5	16	44.5	5	4.5	0	5.5	1	0.5	1
Ireland	6	1	5	2.5	81	1	1	0	2	0	0	0
Italy	4.5	3	2.5	4	39	9	15.5	3	13.5	2.5	0	0
Spain	1.5	4.5	1	2	69	3	8	1.5	7	2.5	0	0
Ukraine	4.5	20.5	0.5	44	8	3	4.5	0.5	6.5	1	0.5	5.5
Ashkenazi Jews	4	10	9	9.5	19	19	20.5	2	0.5	5	0	1.5
Sephardi Jews	1	5	13	15	25	22	9	6	0	2	0	2

Culturally and linguistically, the Portuguese are close to Galicians. The similarities among the two groups are pronounced. Galician and Portuguese are sometimes considered the same language (see also: Reintegrationism).

== Demography ==
=== Demographics ===
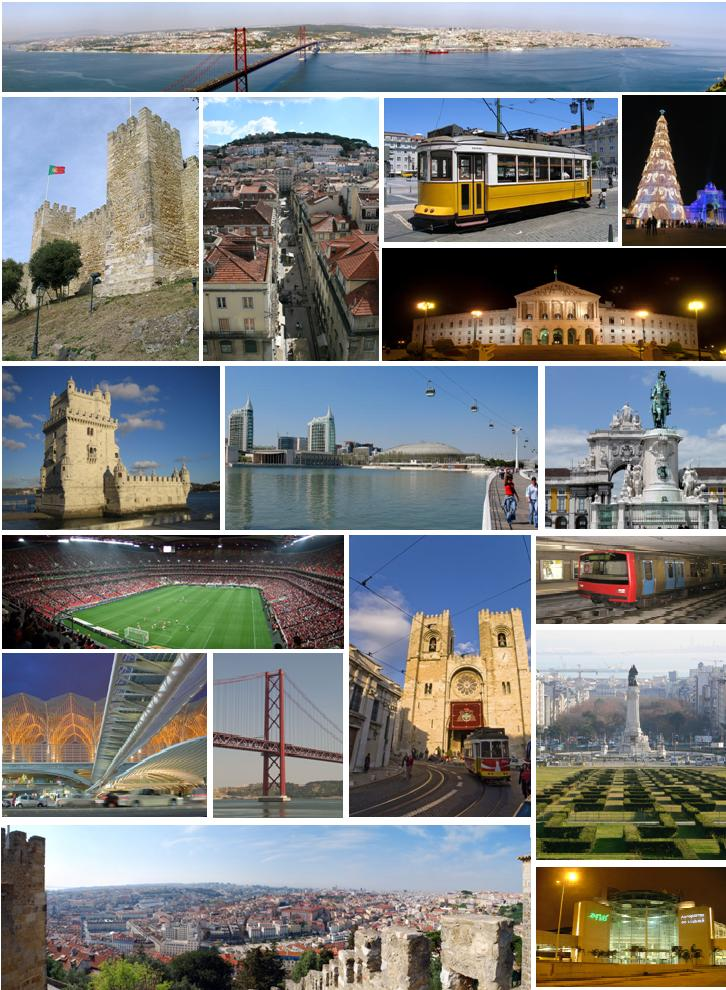
Lisbon, with 545,143 inhabitants in the city proper, is the capital and the largest city in Portugal.

Around 9.15 million (87%) Portuguese-born people live in the country, out of a total population of 10.467 million.

About 782,000 foreigners live legally in the country (7%), thus approximately 9.685 million people living in Portugal hold Portuguese citizenship or legal residency.

The median age stood at 46.8 years (versus 44.4 in the EU as a whole) as of 2023. People aged 65 or more accounted for 23%. The total fertility rate is 1.35 against the EU average of 1.53. Life expectancy at birth is 83. Due to the high percentage of senior citizens, the crude mortality rate (12%) is well in excess of the crude birth rate (8%).

Portugal boasts one of the world's lowest infant mortality rates (3%), down from 9% in 1961. The average age of women at first childbirth was at 30 years, in contrast to the EU average of 28.

About 67% live in urban settings, concentrated along the coast and in the Lisbon metropolitan area, which hosts 2,883,645, or 28%.

About 65% of the national population, or 6,760,989 people, live in the 56 municipalities with more than 50,000 inhabitants, about 18% of all national municipalities. The country hosts 122 municipalities, about 40% of all national municipalities, with a population of 10,000 inhabitants or less, totaling 678,855 inhabitants, about 7% of the national population.

=== Native minority languages ===
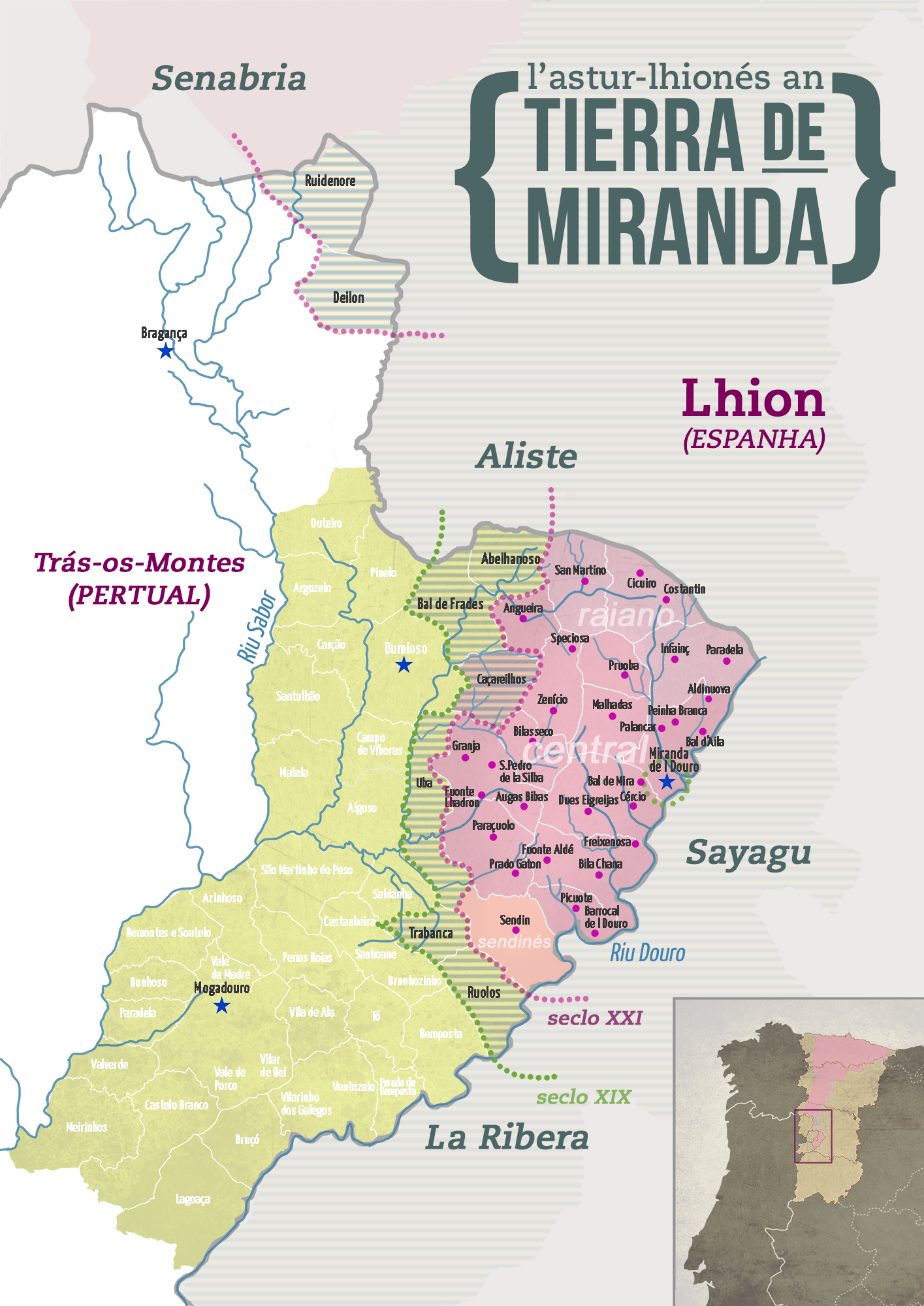
Areas in Northern Portugal where Mirandese is spoken

The main language spoken as first language is Portuguese. Other autochthonous languages include:

- Caló (see also Caló language), the language of the Portuguese-Romani community. Some 52,000 Romani people live in Portugal.
- Mirandês (see also Mirandese language) is an officially recognised language. It enjoys special protection in the areas of Miranda do Douro, Vimioso, and Mogadouro. About 15,000 people speak the language (0.14%). The language is part of the Asturian-Leonese linguistic group which includes the Asturian and Leonese minority languages of Northwestern Spain. All of its speakers are bilingual and speak Portuguese: code-switching is common.
- Barranquenhu (see also Barranquenho) is spoken in the town of Barrancos (in the border between Extremadura and Andalusia, in Spain). Some 3,000 speak the language (0.03%). It is a Portuquese dialect influenced by Extremaduran and, later, southern Spanish.
- Minderico – a sociolect or argot spoken in Minde, which is practically extinct (150 remaining speakers).
- Portuguese Sign Language, the official language for the deaf community. About 30,000 deaf people (0.29%) use the language. The first teacher of deaf-mutes in France was Portuguese-Jew Jacob Rodrigues Pereira.

=== Ethnic minorities ===
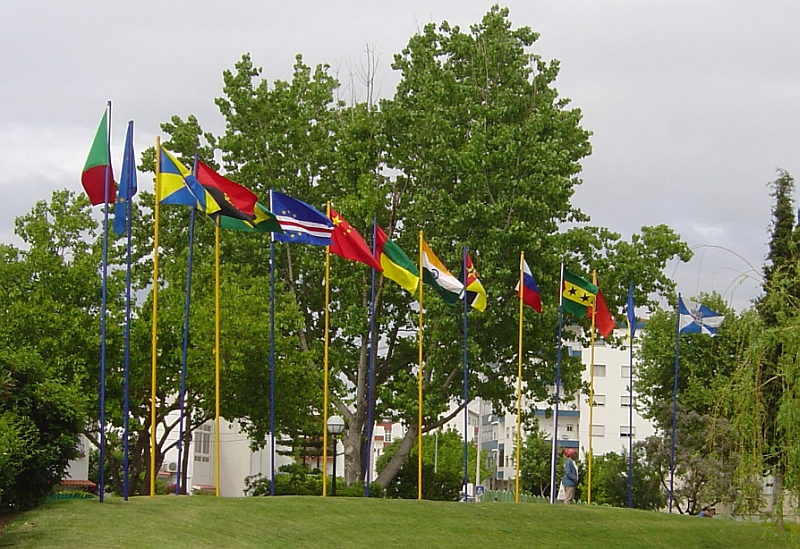
Flags of the countries of origin of the main immigrant communities in the municipality of Seixal

People from Portugal's former colonies, particularly Brazil, Portuguese Africa (especially Afro-Portuguese), Macau, Portuguese India and Timor-Leste, have been migrating to Portugal since the 1900s.

Many Slavs, especially Ukrainians (now one of the biggest ethnic minorities) and Russians, as well as Moldovans, Romanians, Bulgarians and Georgians, have been migrating to Portugal since the late 20th century. A wave of Ukrainians arrived in Portugal after the Russian invasion of Ukraine, approximately 60,000, making them the second largest migrant community after Brazilians.

A Chinese minority of Macau Cantonese origin as well as of Chinese mainlanders are present.

Other relevant Asian communities include Indians, Nepalis, Bangladeshis and Pakistanis while, dealing with Latin Americans, Venezuelans – numbering about 27,700 – are present.

A small minority of Romani live–about 52,000.

Portugal is home to other EU and EEA/EFTA nationals (French, Germans, Dutch, Swedes, Spaniards). The UK and France represented the largest senior resident communities as of 2019. They are part of a larger expatriate community including Germans, Dutch, Belgians and Swedes.

Officially registered foreigners amount to 7% of the population. Descendants of immigrants are excluded (Portugal, like many European countries, does not collect data on ethnicity) and those who, regardless of place of birth or citizenship at birth, were Portuguese citizens.

Some 100,000 Muslims and 5,000–6,000 Jews (mostly Sephardi such as the Belmonte Jews, and Ashkenazi).

Flag maps (Note: Only people legally registered as living in Portugal and not holding Portuguese nationality (thus excluding naturalised citizens and descendants of immigrants) are taken into account.) for each Portuguese district as of January 2022<ref>"SEFSTAT – Portal de Estatística". sefstat.sef.pt.</ref>

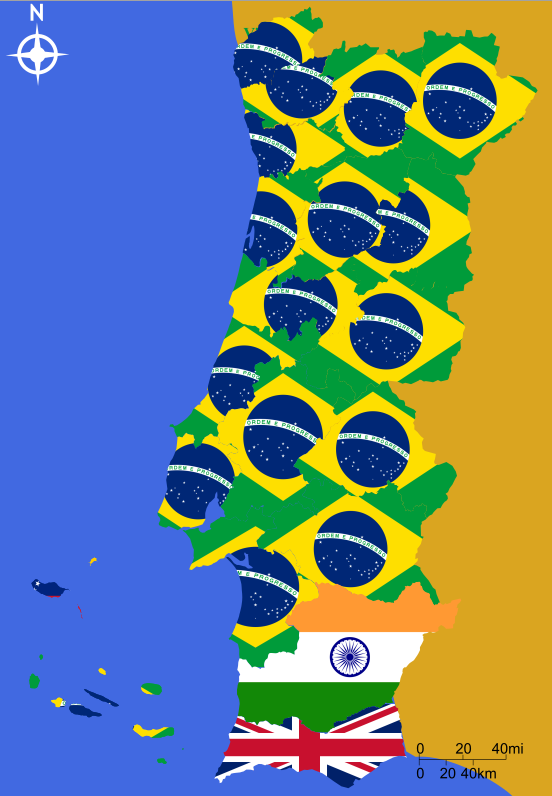
Largest immigrant population by district. Brazilians plus Venezuelans in Madeira, Britons in Algarve and Indians in Beja

Second largest. Cape Verdeans in Lisbon Area, Italians in Porto with Britons and Romanians in the interior.

Third largest. US-citizens in the Azores, Chinese in the north, Africans in Lisbon metropolitan area.

Fourth largest. Angolans and Eastern Europeans (such as Ukrainians in Santarém) present nationwide

Fifth largest. Chinese near the Spanish border and Europeans along the coast.

== Surnames ==
A Portuguese surname is typically composed of a variable number of family names (rarely one, often two or three or more). The first additional names are usually the mother's surname(s) and the father's family surname(s). For practicality, usually only the final surname (excluding prepositions) is used in greetings.

Portugal's adaptable naming system complies with the country's legal framework. The law mandates that a child must be given at least one personal name and one surname from a parent. The limit is two personal names and four surnames.

In pre-Roman times, inhabitants had either a single name or a name followed by a patronym, which reflected their ethnicity or their tribe/region. These names could be Celtic, Lusitanian, Iberian, or Conii. However, the Roman onomastic system began to slowly gain popularity after the first century AD. This system involved adopting a Roman name (tria nomina), which consisted of a praenomen (given name), nomen (gentile), and cognomen. Today, most Portuguese surnames have a Germanic patronymic (such as Henriques, Pires, Rodrigues, Lopes, Nunes, Mendes, Fernandes etc. where the ending -es means "son of"), locative (Gouveia, Guimarães, Lima, Maia, Mascarenhas, Serpa, Montes, Fonseca, Barroso), religious origin (Cruz, Reis, De Jesus, Moysés, Nascimento), occupational (Carpinteiro (carpenter), Malheiro (wool-maker, thresher), Jardineiro (gardener), or derived from physical appearance (Branco (white), Trigueiro (brown, tanned), Louraço (blond). Toponymic, locative, and religion-derived surnames are often preceded by the preposition 'of' in its varying forms: (De, de), (Do, do- masculine), (Da, da- feminine) or 'of the' (dos, Dos, das, Das – plural) such as De Carvalho, Da Silva, de Gouveia, Da Costa, da Maia, do Nascimento, dos Santos, das Mercês. If the preposition is followed by a vowel, sometimes apostrophes are used in surnames (or stage names) such as D'Oliveira, d'Abranches, d'Eça. In some previous Asian colonies (India, Malaysia, East Timor) alternative spellings are used such as 'D'Souza, Desouza, De Cunha, Ferrao, Dessais, Balsemao, Conceicao, Gurjao, Mathias, Thomaz.

The majority of Portuguese have multiple surnames.

Most Common Surnames
Rank	Surname	Percentage	Individuals (000)
1	Silva	9.44%	999
2	Santos	5.96%	628
3	Ferreira	5.25%	553
4	Pereira	4.88%	514
5	Oliveira	3.71%	391
6	Costa	3.68%	387
7	Rodrigues	3.57%	376
8	Martins	3.23%	340
9	Jesus	2.99%	315
10	Sousa	2.95%	311
11	Fernandes	2.82%	297
12	Gonçalves	2.76%	291
13	Gomes	2.57%	271
14	Lopes	2.52%	265
15	Marques	2.51%	265
16	Alves	2.37%	250
17	Almeida	2.27%	239
18	Ribeiro	2.27%	239
19	Pinto	2.09%	220
20	Carvalho	1.97%	208
21	Teixeira	1.69%	178
22	Moreira	1.54%	162
23	Correia	1.53%	161
24	Mendes	1.39%	146
25	Nunes	1.32%	139

Note: Percentages total > 100 because of individuals with multiple surnames.

== Diaspora ==
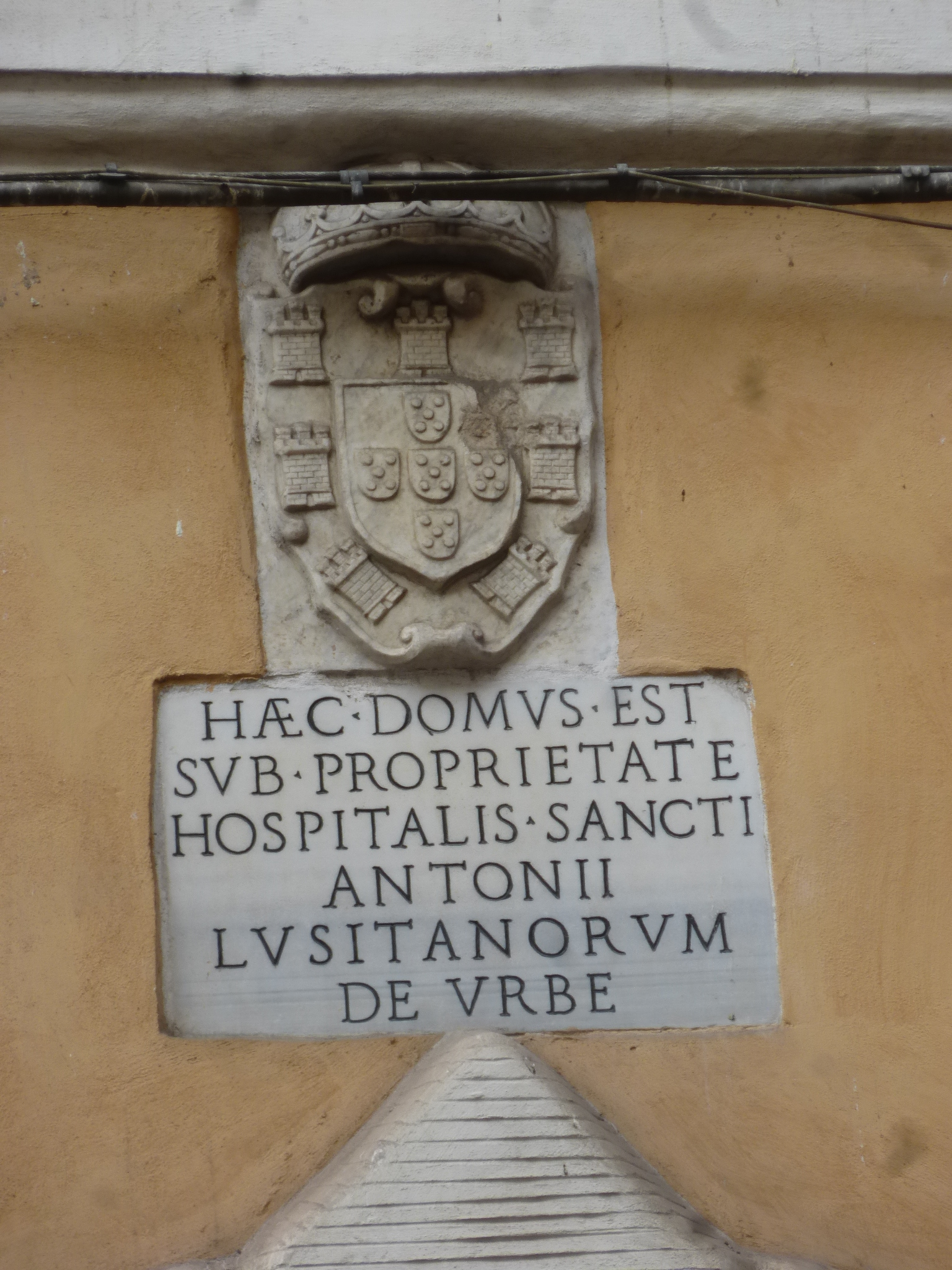

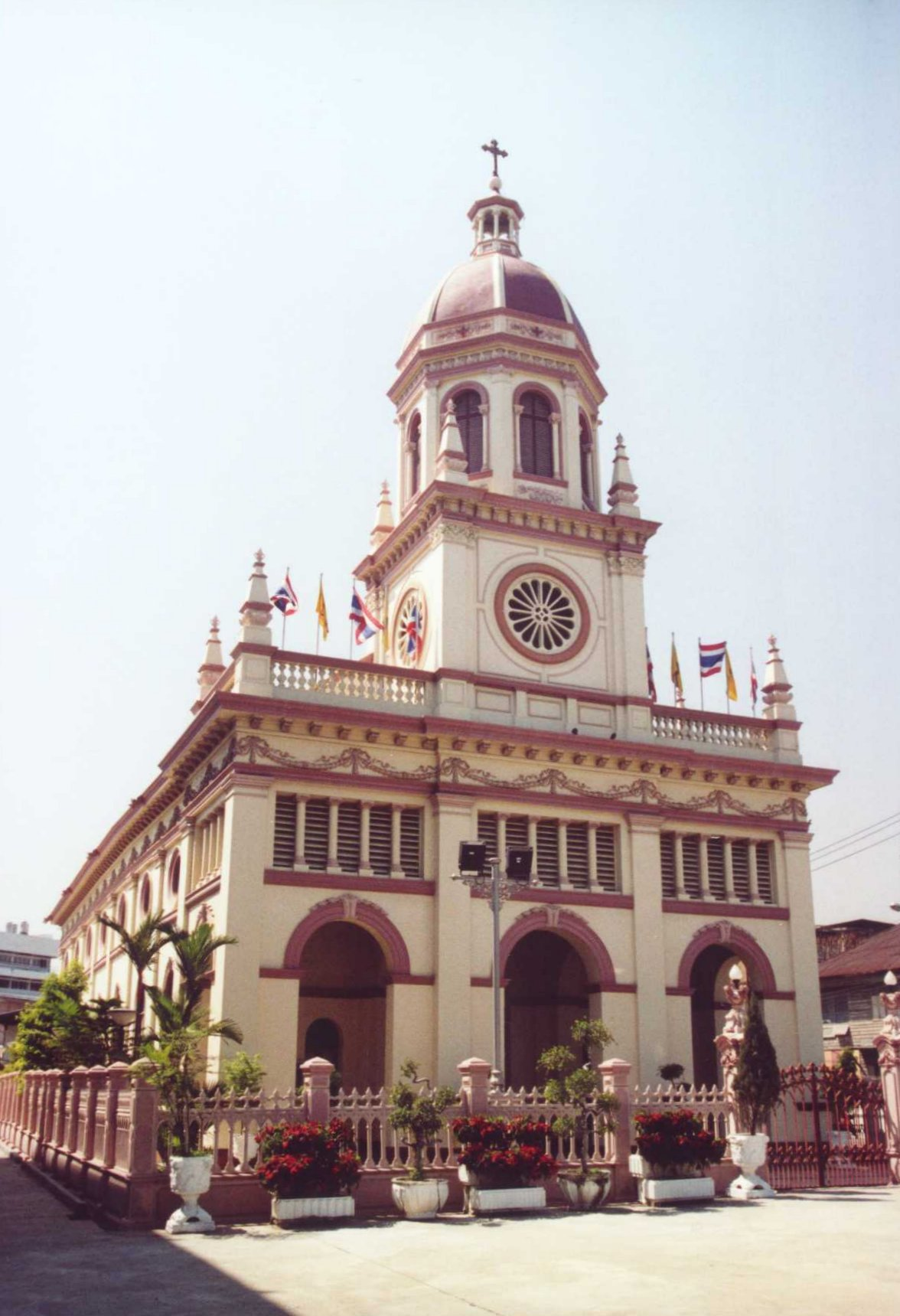
Portuguese coat of arms and sign – commending the property and hospital to Anthony of Lisbon – outside the Church of Sant'Antonio dei Portoghesi, Rome; the Portuguese presence in Europe outside of Portugal, has had many reasons such as economic, cultural and religious (up). Santa Cruz Church, Thon Buri District, Bangkok, Constructed by Portuguese monks in the 18th Century (down)

Portugal was traditionally a land of emigration: according to estimates, more than one hundred million people could have recognizable Portuguese ancestors, with Portuguese diasporas found in diverse regions in all continents. However, poor sources for statistics dating hundreds of years ago complicate any estimates.

Explorations in the 15th and 16th centuries and colonial expansion encouraged worldwide emigration to South Asia, the Americas, Macau, East-Timor, Malaysia, Indonesia, Myanmar and Africa, particularly to former colonies (see Luso-Africans). Portuguese emigration contributed to the settlement of the Atlantic islands, Brazil (where the majority of the population is of Portuguese descent), Goa Catholic Goans, Portuguese Burghers in Sri Lanka, in Malacca the Kristang and in Macau the Macaense. The Portuguese Empire, which lasted nearly 600 years, ended when Macau returned to China in 1999. During the period, millions left Portugal. Inter-ethnic marriage and cultural influences, produced dialects based on Portuguese in the former colonies (e.g. Forro) and in other countries (e.g. Papiamentu).

In addition, a considerable segment of the diaspora is due to recent mass emigration, mainly for economic reasons. Between 1886 and 1966 Portugal had more emigrants than any Western European country save Ireland. Nearly two million left to live mainly in Brazil, but also significant numbers settled in the US, Canada, and the Caribbean. About 1.2 million Brazilian citizens are native Portuguese.

By 1989 some 4,000,000 Portuguese citizens were living abroad, mainly in France, Germany, Brazil, South Africa, Canada, Venezuela, and the US. Estimates from 2021 are that as much as 5 million Portuguese citizens (not descendants or citizens registered within the Portuguese consular authorities) may be living abroad.

Within Europe, many Portuguese live in Francophone countries like France, Luxembourg and Switzerland, spurred in part by the linguistic proximity of Portuguese and French. In fact, according to data from the General Directorate of Consular Affairs and Portuguese Communities of the Portuguese Ministry of Foreign Affairs, the countries with the largest Portuguese communities are, in ascending order, France, the UK and Switzerland.

=== Sephardi Jews ===
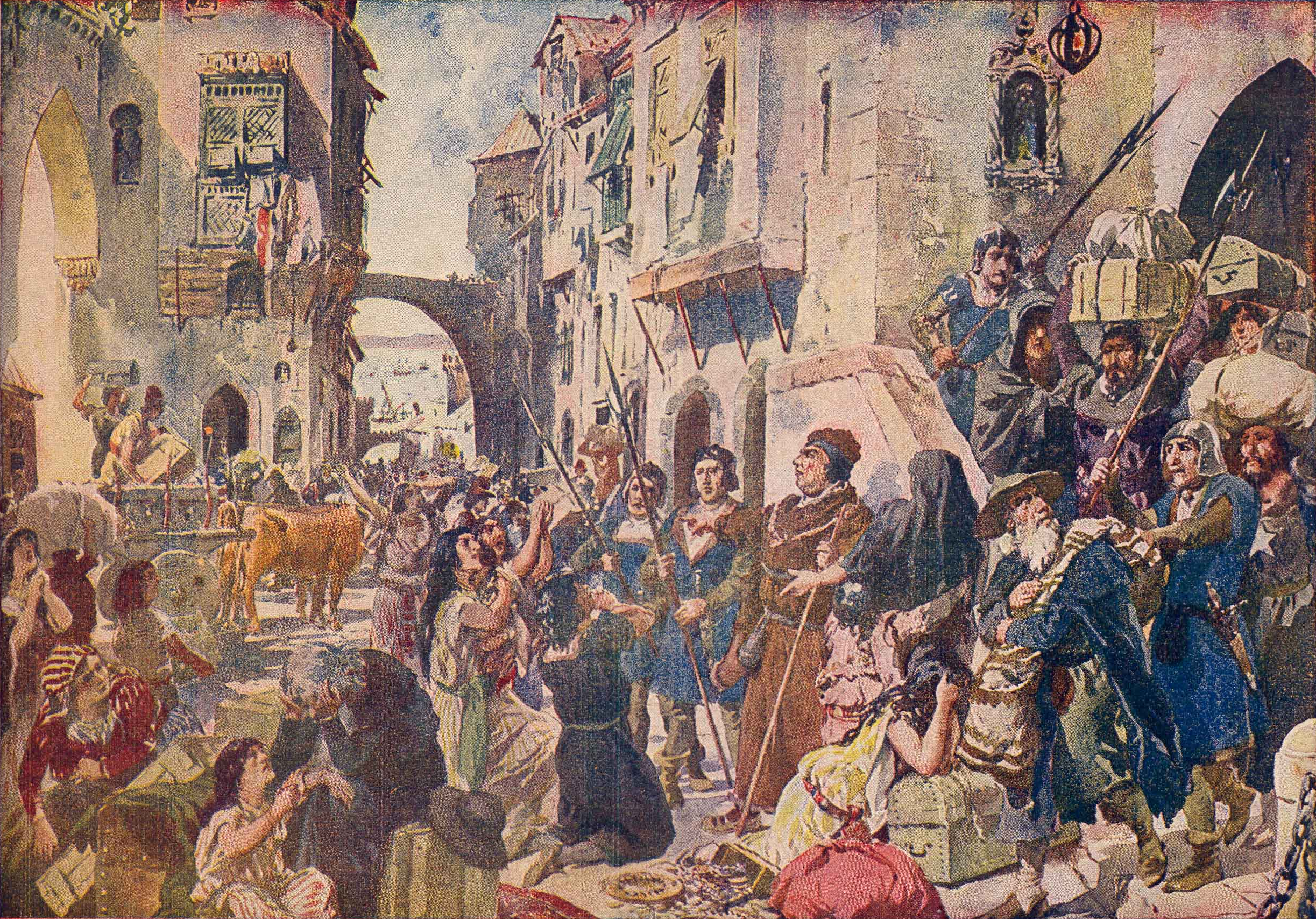
"The Banishment of the Jews", by Alfredo Roque Gameiro, in Quadros da História de Portugal ("Pictures of the History of Portugal", 1917)

Descendants of Portuguese Sephardi Jews established many communities around the world, including in significant numbers in Israel, the Netherlands, the United States, France, Venezuela, Brazil and Turkey.

==== Expulsion ====
The Portuguese Jewish diaspora was mainly a result of the expulsion decree issued in 1496 by the Portuguese monarchy, which targeted Portuguese-Jews. This decree forced many Jews to either convert to Christianity (leading to the emergence of Cristão-novos and of Crypto-Judaism practices) or to leave, leading Portuguese Jews to settle throughout Europe and Brazil. In Brazil many of the early colonists were originally Sephardi Jews who, following their conversion, were known as New Christians (see Anusim).

==== Emigration ====
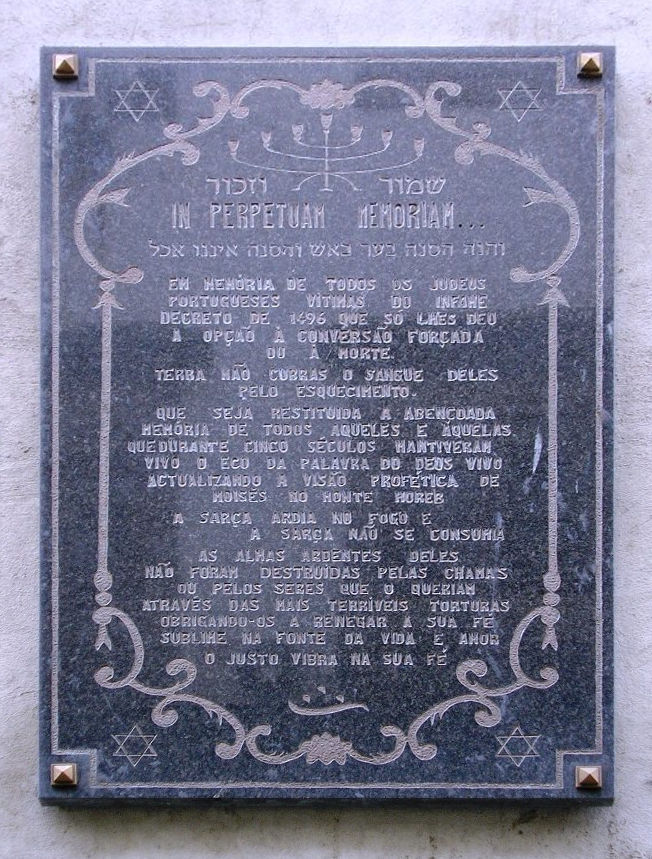
In memoriam of the expulsion of the Jews from Porto.

Up to 10,000 Portuguese-Jews might have migrated to France from 1497; this phenomenon remained noticeable until the 1600s, when the Netherlands became a favorite choice.

The Netherlands and England became top destinations for these emigrants because those places had no Inquisition. Adding to the economical and cultural aspects of their host countries, Portuguese-Jews established institutions that continue, such as the Esnoga, in Amsterdam, Congregation Shearith Israel (America's oldest Jewish congregation), Bevis Marks Synagogue (the UK's oldest synagogue) – the Spanish and Portuguese Synagogue of Montreal – (Canada's oldest synagogue) – Mount Sinai Hospital, City Lights Booksellers, and David Cardozo Academy in Jerusalem.

Smaller communities thrived in the Balkans, Italy, the Ottoman Empire and Germany, especially in Hamburg (see Elijah Aboab Cardoso Joan d'Acosta and Samuel ben Abraham Aboab).

Portuguese-Jews were responsible for the appearance of Papiamentu (a 300,000 strong Portuguese-based creole now the official language in Aruba, Curaçao and Bonaire) and of Sranan Tongo, a Portuguese-influenced, English-based creole by spoken by more than 500,000 in Suriname.

==== Shoah ====
During the Shoah, nearly 4,000 Jews of Portuguese descent residing in the Netherlands lost their lives, making up the largest group of casualties with a Portuguese background. Among famous Portuguese-Jewish victims of the Shoah is painter Baruch Lopes Leão de Laguna. Although officially neutral, the Portuguese regime at that time, Estado Novo, aligned with Germany's ideology and failed to protect its citizens and other Jewish people living overseas. Despite the lack of support by the Portuguese authorities, Jews of both Portuguese and other descent were saved thanks to individuals such as Carlos Sampaio Garrido, Joaquim Carreira, José Brito Mendes and Aristides de Sousa Mendes, who alone helped 34,000 Jews

==== Twenty-first century ====
Over 500 years after the expulsion decree, in 2015 the Portuguese parliament officially acknowledged that the expulsion of its citizens of Jewish descent was wrong. The government then passed a Law of Return that aimed to address the wrongs of the Portuguese Inquisition. The law grants citizenship to any descendants of those persecuted Jews able to confirm their Sephardic Jewish ancestry and a "connection" to Portugal.

Thereafter, more than 140,000 people of Sephardic descent, from 60 countries (mostly Israel and Turkey) applied for Portuguese citizenship. Thereafter, foreigners with no legitimate links were granted Portuguese and thus EU citizenship, including Russian oligarch Roman Abramovich. Such abuse prompted the judiciary to review the law.

Notable people of Portuguese-Jewish descent include:

- Amatus Lusitanus (1511–1568): Jewish physician said to have discovered the valves in the azygos vein.
- Gracia Mendes Nasi (1510–1569): Philanthropist and one of the wealthiest Jewish women of Renaissance Europe
- Leonora Duarte (1610–1678): a Flemish composer and musician
- Baruch Spinoza (1632–1677): Dutch philosopher of Portuguese-Jewish origin
- Catherine da Costa (1679–1756): English miniaturist
- David Ricardo (1772–1823): a British political economist
- Rehuel Lobatto (1797–1866): Dutch mathematician whose notable contributions include Gauss-Lobatto quadrature method and the Lobatto polynomials
- Isaäc da Costa (1798–1860): a Jewish poet.
- Pereire brothers (19th century): major figures in the development of France's finance and infrastructure
- Samuel Sarphati (1813–1866): Dutch physician and Amsterdam city planner
- Solomon Nunes Carvalho (1815–1897): American painter, photographer, author and inventor
- Grace Aguilar (1816–1847): English novelist, poet and writer on Jewish history and religion
- Camille Pissarro (1830–1903): a Danish-French Impressionist and Neo-Impressionist painter considered the "dean of the Impressionist painters"
- Francis Lewis Cardozo (1836–1903): American clergyman, politician, and educator. When elected in South Carolina as Secretary of State in 1868, he was the first African American to hold a statewide office in the United States
- Maud Nathan (1862–1946): American social worker, labor activist and women's suffragist
- Federigo Enriques (1871–1946): Italian mathematician, now known principally as the first to give a classification of algebraic surfaces in birational geometry, and other contributions in algebraic geometry
- Frieda Belinfante (1904–1995): Dutch cellist, philharmonic conductor, a prominent lesbian, and a member of the Dutch resistance during World War II
- Pierre Mendès France (1907-1982) : French politician, Prime Minister from 1954 to 1955.
- William Leonard Pereira (1909–1985): American architect
- Abraham Pais (1918–2000): Dutch-American physicist and science historian
- Louisa Benson Craig (1941–2010): Burmese-born two-time beauty pageant winner and Karen rebel leader of Portuguese-Jewish descent
- Alberto Portugheis (1941): Argentine pianist
- Henrique Cymerman (1959): Israeli journalist
- Shon Weissman (1996): Israeli footballer

=== Americas outside of Brazil ===
==== United States ====
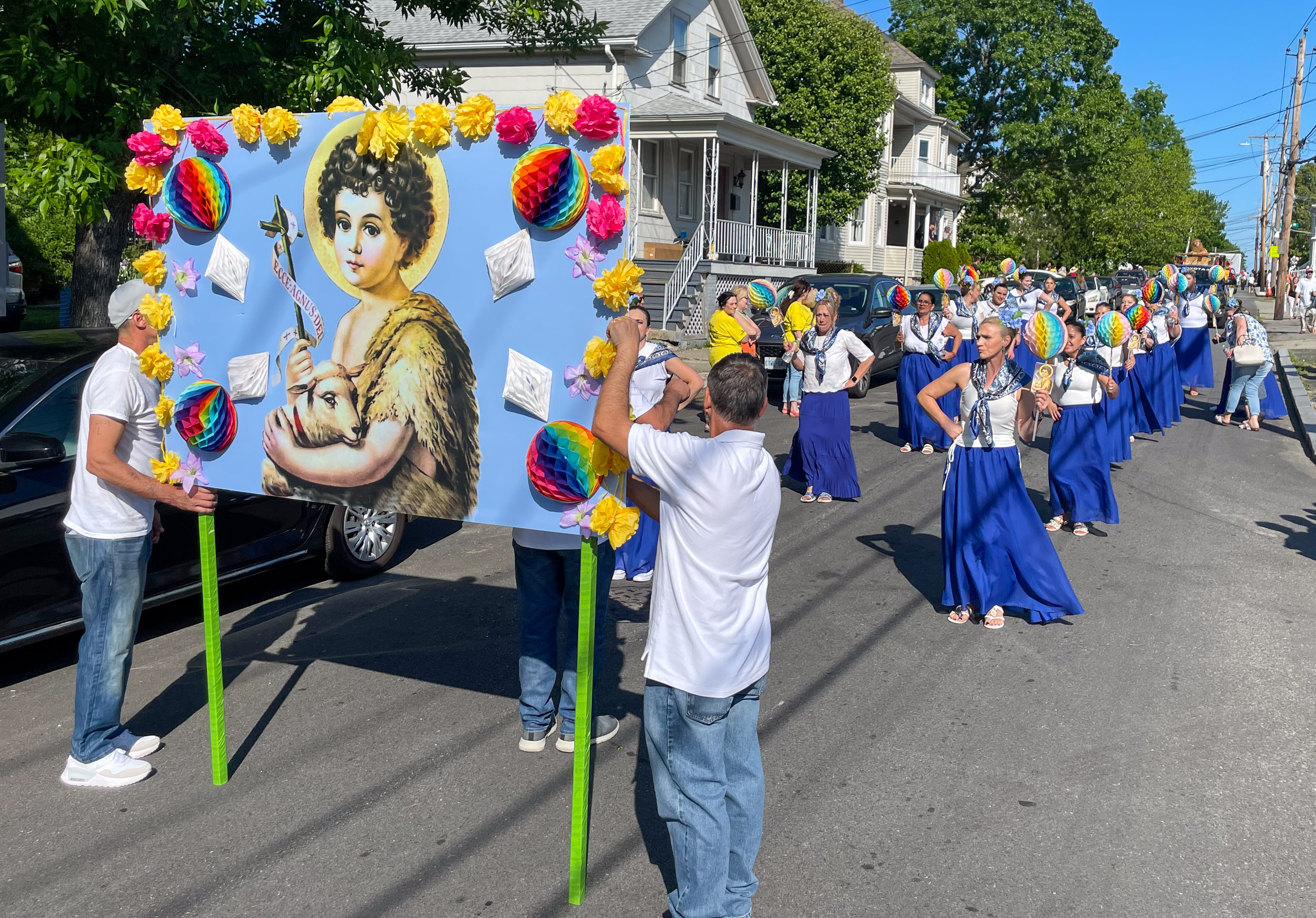
Bodo de Leite parade in East Providence, Rhode Island

The US established bilateral relations with Portugal when Portugal became the first neutral country to acknowledge the United States.

Despite Portugal never attempting to colonize any territory that became part of the US, navigators such as João Fernandes Lavrador, Miguel Corte-Real and João Rodrigues Cabrilho are among its earliest documented European explorers. Dighton Rock, in Southeastern Massachusetts, is a marker of early Portuguese presence.

Mathias de Sousa, who was potentially a Sephardic Jew of mixed African background, is believed to be the first documented Portuguese resident of colonial United States. Another Portuguese Jew, Isaac Touro, is commemorated in the name of the US' oldest synagogue, the Touro Synagogue.

Portuguese started to settle in significant numbers only in the 19th century, with major migration waves occurring in the first half of the 20th century, especially from the Azores. Of the 1,4 million Portuguese Americans found in the US (0.4% of its population) the majority are originally from the Azores. The arrival of Azorean emigrants was easier because of geographic proximity and was encouraged by the Azorean Refugee Act of 1958, sponsored by then-Senator John F. Kennedy and John Pastore to help the population affected by the 1957–58, the Capelinhos volcano eruption. Moreover, the 1965 Immigration Act stated that if someone had legal or American relatives in the US who would serve as a sponsor, they could obtain the status of legal aliens. This act dramatically increased Portuguese immigration in the 1970s and 1980s.

Major Portuguese communities arose in New Jersey (particularly in Newark), the New England states, California and along the Gulf Coast (Louisiana). Springfield, Illinois once hosted the largest Portuguese community in the Midwest. In the Pacific, Hawaii (see Portuguese immigration to Hawaii) sports a sizable Portuguese population, encouraged by the availability of labor contracts 150 years ago. Elements of Hawaiian cuisine, such as malasadas, originate from Portuguese immigrants to Hawaii.

==== Canada ====
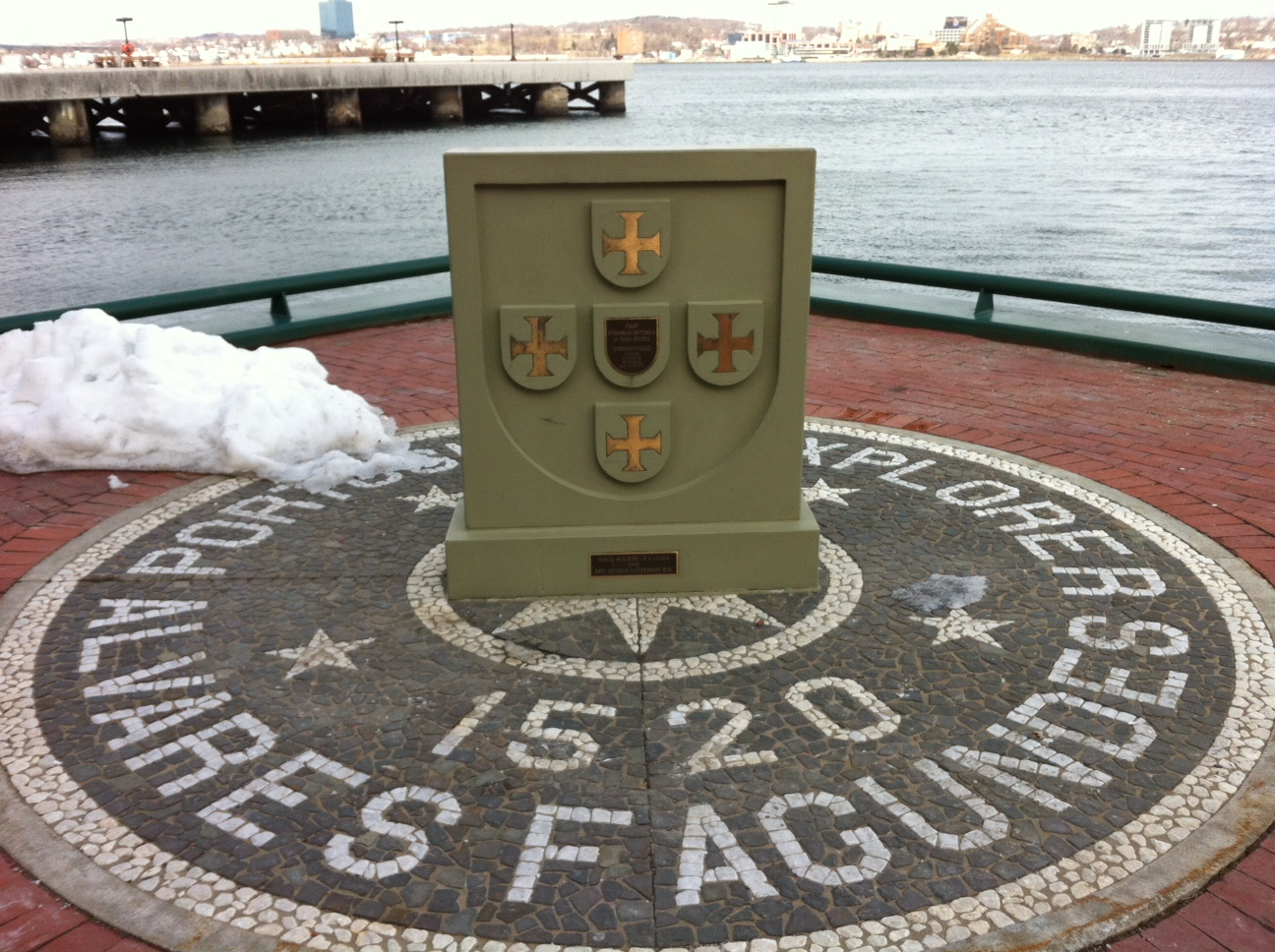

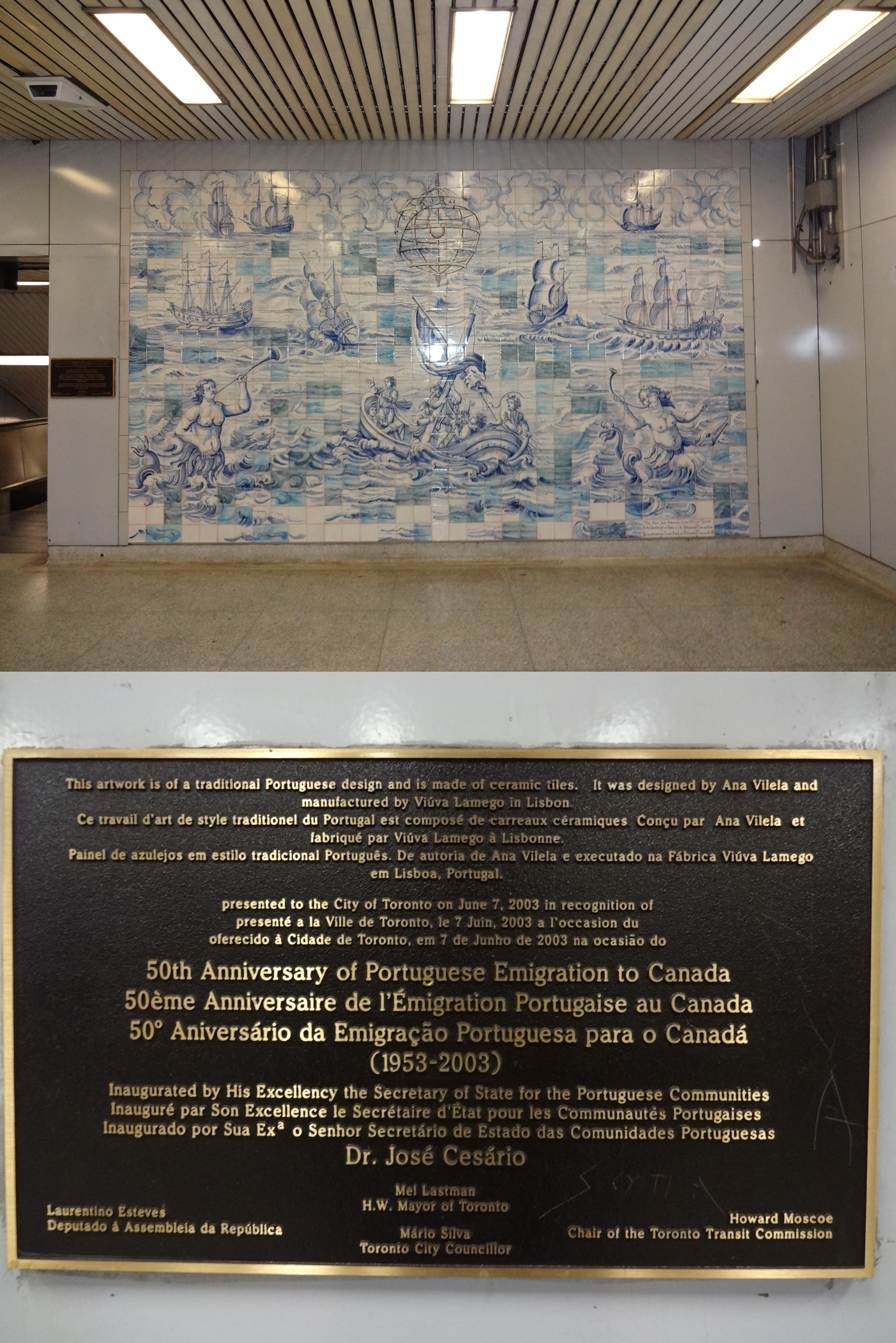
Explorer João Álvares Fagundes commemorative monument surrounded by Portuguese pavement, in Halifax (up) and Azulejos, sign and frame about Portuguese immigration inside a subway station in Toronto (down), both in Canada

Canada, particularly Ontario, Quebec and British Columbia, developed a significant Portuguese community since the 1940s. The availability of more job opportunities in Canada attracted Portuguese migrants, leading to Portuguese culture to flourish. Many Portuguese residents took the initiative to purchase homes and establish businesses.

According to the 2016 Census, 482,610, or 1.4% of Canadians claimed Portuguese ancestry.

Two major neighbourhoods where Portuguese are notable include the Little Portugals in Toronto and Montréal. Montréal's Little Portugal, known as "Petit Portugal" in French, hosts Portuguese shops, restaurants, and cafes, and is also home to "Parc du Portugal" (Portugal's park), featuring vibrant murals and elements inspired by Portuguese design.

The Portuguese language is spoken by over 330,000 Canadians, making up around 1% of the population.

Significant testimonies of the Portuguese presence in Canada include the name of one of the 10 provinces of Canada: Newfoundland and Labrador. King Henry VII coined the name "New found land" for the territory explored by Sebastian and John Cabot. In Portuguese, the land is known as Terra Nova, which translates to "new land," and is also referred to as Terre-Neuve in French, the name for the province's island region. The name Terra Nova is commonly used on the island, including in the name of Terra Nova National Park. The influence of early Portuguese exploration is also evident in the name of Labrador, which is derived from the surname of Portuguese navigator João Fernandes Lavrador. Other remnants of early Portuguese exploration include toponyms such as Baccalieu (from bacalhau, Portuguese for codfish) and Portugal Cove. Portuguese cartographer Diogo Ribeiro is responsible for one of the earliest maps depicting the territory of modern-day Canada.

==== Caribbean ====
The first Portuguese who settled in the Caribbean were merchants or Portuguese-Jews fleeing the Portuguese Inquisition. Migrants from the 1830s came as indentured labourers, especially from Madeira. The 19th century migration coincided with the abolition of slavery in the British colonies. As a result, the Portuguese, along with Indians and Chinese, arrived to replace the slave labor. The Portuguese took a prominent part in shaping the population of the West Indies. Their descendants form an active minority in many countries.

As part of a larger system of low-wage labour, about 2,500 Portuguese left for Antigua and Barbuda (where, more than 1,000 people still speak the language), 30,000 to Guyana (4.3% of the population in 1891) and another 2,000 settled in Trinidad and Tobago between the mid-1800s and the mid-1900s. Portuguese culture survives in the enterprises established by community members. In 2016 the second international airport of Guyana was renamed after a Portuguese Guyanese individual.

Portuguese fishermen, farmers and indentured labourers inhabited other Caribbean countries, especially Jamaica (about 5,700 people, primarily of Portuguese-Jewish descent), St. Vincent and the Grenadines (0.7% of the population), and Suriname, whose first capital, Torarica (literally "rich Torah" in Portuguese), was established by Portuguese-Jewish settlers. Minor communities exist in Grenada, Saint Lucia, Saint Kitts and Nevis and the Cayman Islands

About 4,000 Portuguese people live in the Caribbean territories of Overseas France, especially in Saint Barthélemy (where they constitute about a third of the population), Guadeloupe and Martinique.

Portuguese heritage lives on in Aruba, Bonaire and Curaçao. In the three territories, the official language, Papiamentu, includes numerous Portuguese elements.

The North Atlantic archipelago of Bermuda (10% to 25% of the population) experienced sustained immigration especially from the Azores, as well as from Madeira and the Cape Verde Islands since the 1840s.

Portuguese communities are also present in countries such as Cuba, Dominican Republic, and Puerto Rico. Notable members of the community include activist Ada Bello, businessman Alexis Victoria Yeb, former Nicaraguan First Lady Lila Teresita Abaunza and Felipa Colón de Toledo.

==== Latin America (excluding Brazil) ====
Mexico had flows of Portuguese immigration from the colonial period through the early 20th century, most importantly in northeastern cities such as Saltillo, Monterrey, Durango and Torreon. Santiago Tequixquiac, due to its lime and stone mining deposits, was a place of settlement for Portuguese Crypto-Jews during the colonial period. They were brought there together with the Tlaxcalans and peninsular Spaniards to appease the Otomi indigenous people in that town. Many Lusitanian cultural traits were preserved through the 19th century, such as forcados, gastronomy, some Sephardic customs and its inhabitants' surnames. Bullfighting is a Portuguese tradition that continues in Mexico. A notable Portuguese-Mexican Jew was Francisca Nuñez de Carabajal, executed by burning at the stake by the Inquisition for judaizing in 1596.

Venezuela hosts the largest community of Portuguese immigrants in Latin America after Brazil. Portuguese nationals began arriving in the country during the early and mid-20th century as economic migrants, particularly from Madeira. Distinct from this immigrant group, the population of Portuguese descent (lusodescendants) is estimated at approximately 1.2 million individuals.

Colombia did not welcome mass Portuguese immigration. Although Portuguese may have explored the area, they did not establish communities there. Colombia became a Spanish colony, as defined by the Treaty of Tordesillas. The Portuguese embassy in Bogota estimated that around 800 Portuguese nationals live there. The number with Portuguese ancestry is not known, but they left little mark on the culture, except for some surnames.

In Peru, a modest migration began at the time of the Viceroyalty of Peru. Sailors who traveled along the Peruvian coast, and later entered the country from the Atlantic via the Amazon River settled there. Records of Luso-Brazilians survive in the cities surrounding the Brazil-Peru border. Portuguese citizens in Peru number about 2,000, Peruvians with Portuguese ancestry could approach 1 million, including direct and indirect descendants, or about 3% of the total. A famous Peruvian of Portuguese descent is popular TV presenter Janet Barboza.

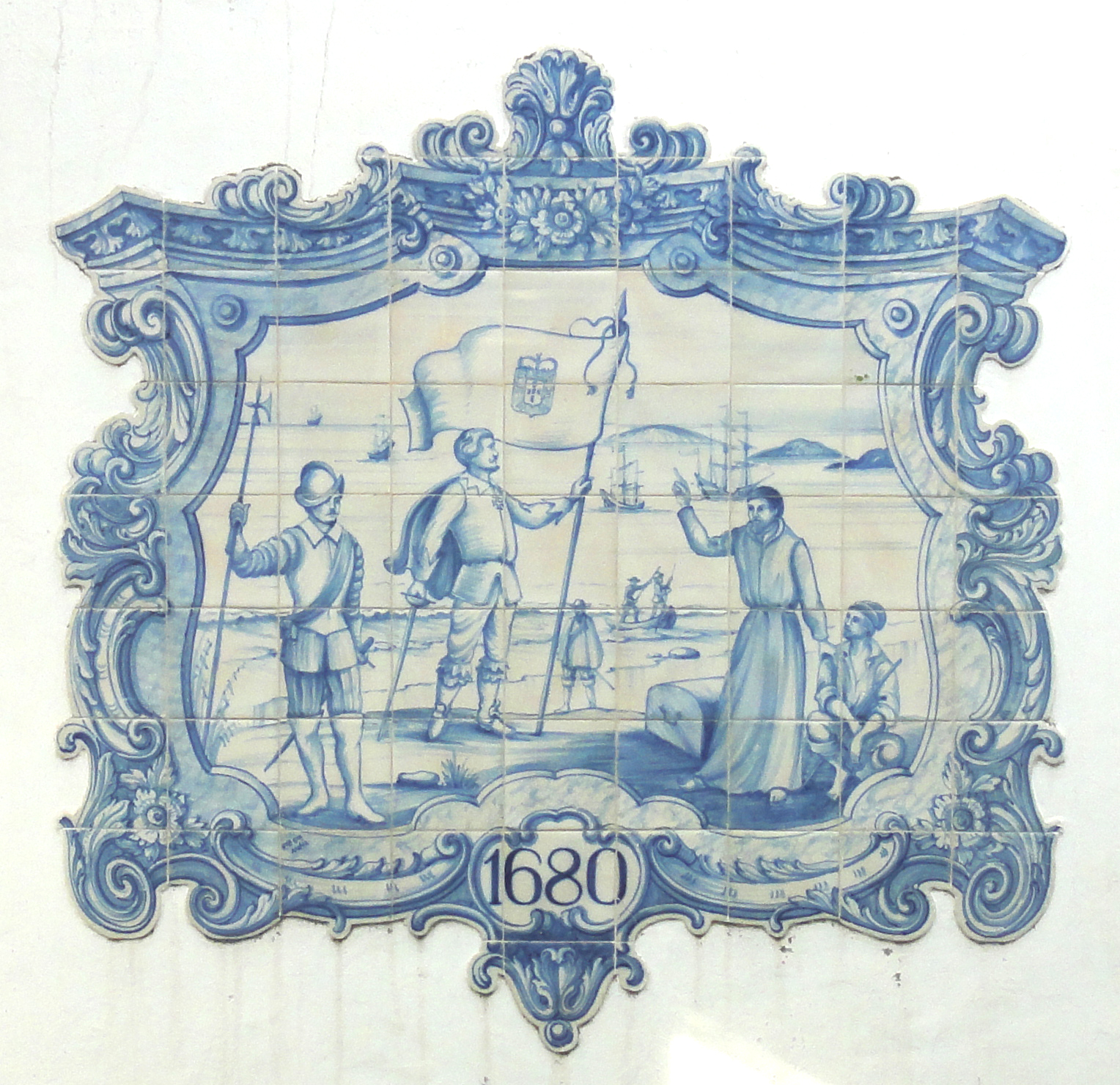
Azulejo depicting the foundation of Colonia del Sacramento, now a Unesco World Heritage Site, Portuguese Museum

The Cono Sur region had Portuguese immigration beginning in the early 20th century. The Portuguese and Cape Verdean community in Argentina, Uruguay and Chile numbers around 255,000 people combined (0.37% of the region's population).

Portuguese Uruguayans are mainly of Azorean descent. Portuguese presence in the country dates to colonial times, in particular to the establishment of Colonia del Sacramento by the Portuguese in 1680, which eventually turned into a regional smuggling center. Other Portuguese entered Uruguay from Brazil. During the second half of the 19th century and part of the 20th, several additional Portuguese immigrants arrived; the last wave came during 1930–1965. As of 2021, 3,069 Portuguese citizens had registered as residing in Uruguay. Many luso-descendants also reside there, but numbers are lacking.

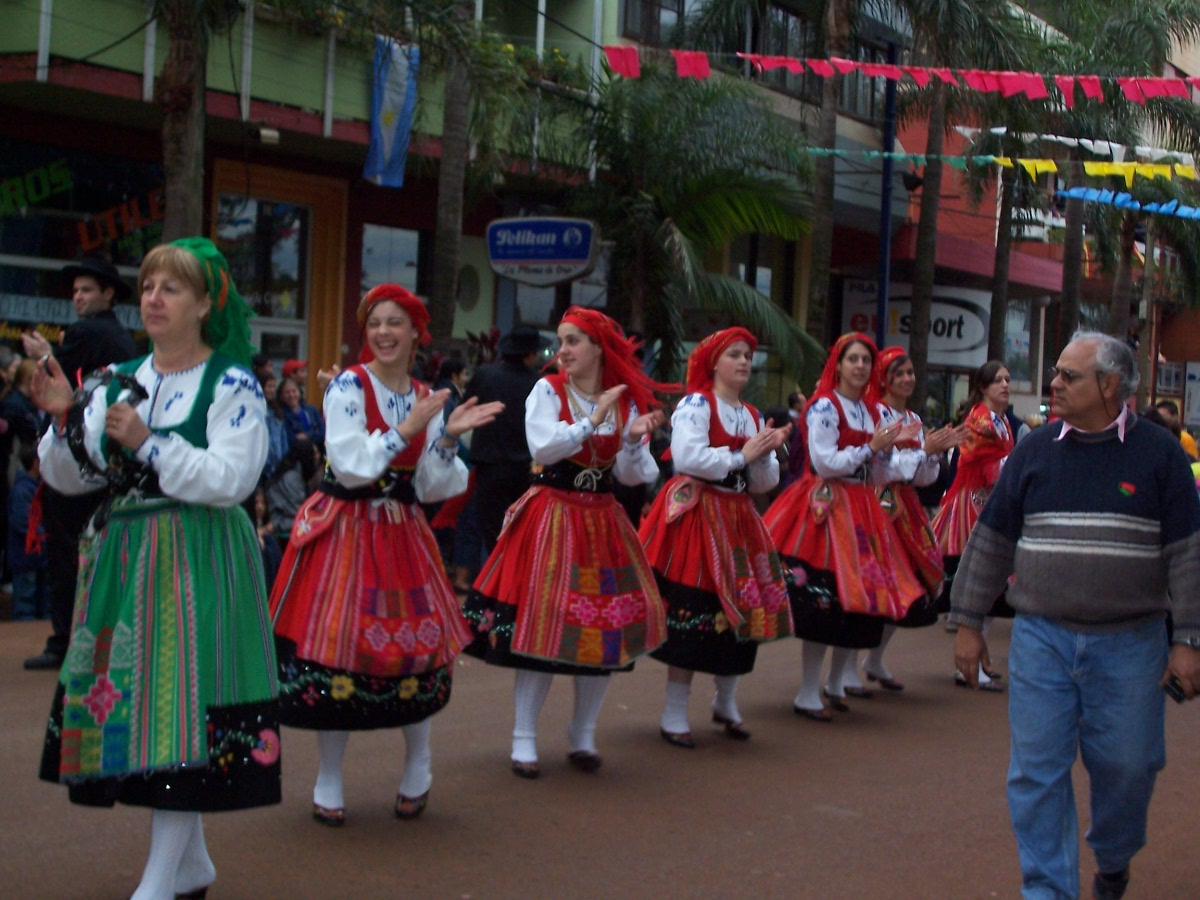
Portuguese community in Oberá, Misiones, Argentina

Argentina-Portugal relations date back to the early explorers, as the Río de la Plata (literally, silver river) was first explored by the Portuguese in the 1510s. In Argentina, Portuguese immigration remained limited due to a preference for Brazil. However, the Portuguese constituted the second-largest immigrant group after the Spanish before 1816 and continued to arrive throughout the 19th century. While a significant number settled in the interior, the primary destination was Buenos Aires. Many men from Lisbon, Porto, and coastal regions of Portugal, predominantly in maritime professions, were already present. During the 1970s, they began to organize ethnically, and community life developed. A popular member of the Portuguese community in Argentina was best-selling author Silvina Bullrich.

=== Africa ===
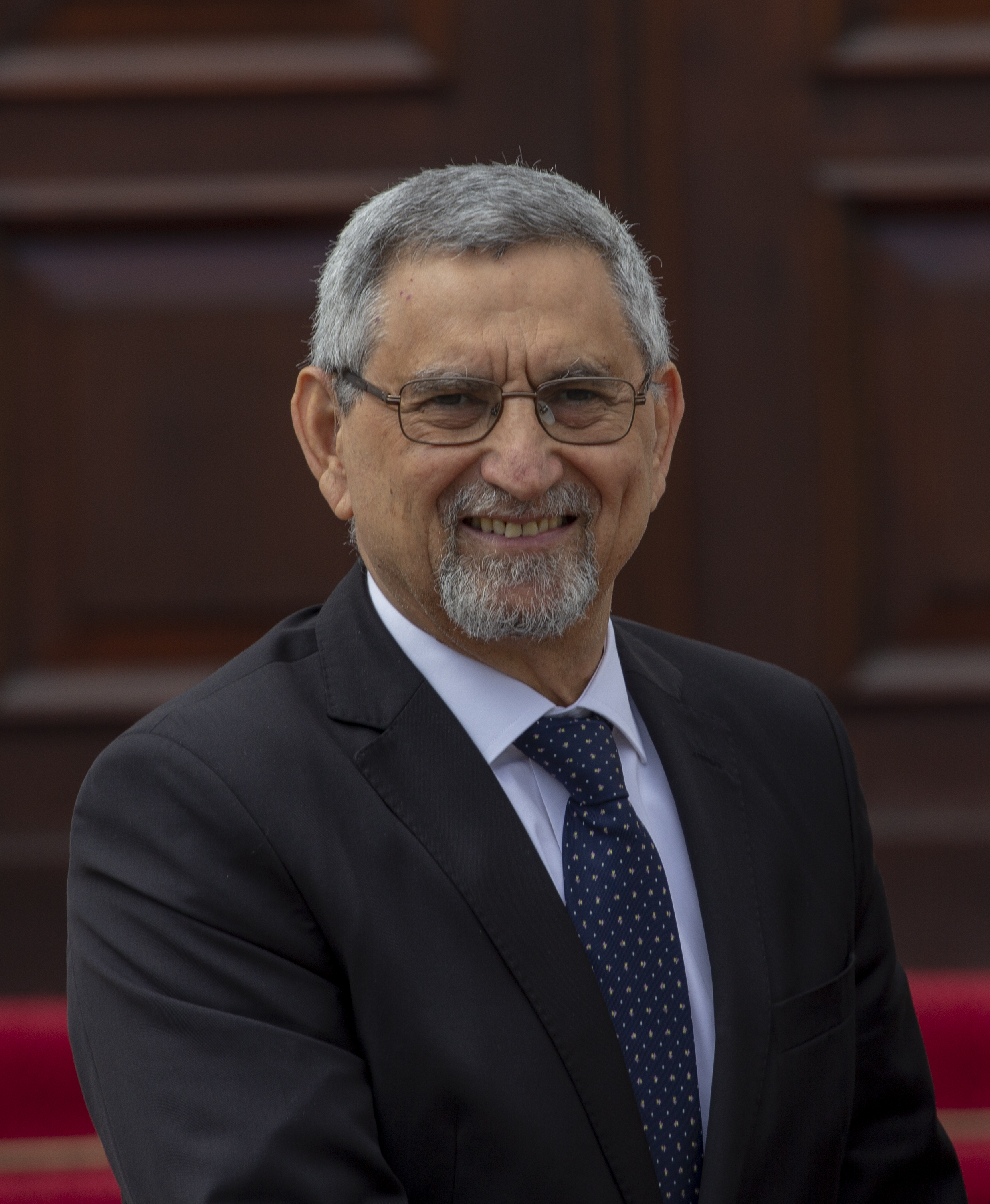
Former Cape Verdian President Jorge Carlos Fonseca

In the early twentieth century the Portuguese government encouraged migration to Angola and Mozambique, and by the 1970s, up to 1 million Portuguese settlers were living in Portugal's overseas African provinces. Minor communities settled in Guinea-Bissau, Equatorial Guinea, Cape Verde and São Tomé and Príncipe, Portuguese influences continue there: Portuguese enjoys the status of official language.

Following the Carnation Revolution, as the country's African possessions gained independence in 1975, an estimated 800,000 Portuguese emigrated from the former colonies. Returnees to Portugal are often referred as Retornados (literally, those who came back).

Some Portuguese moved to South Africa, Botswana, and Algeria. In particular, South Africa hosts the largest Portuguese community in the continent, numbering about 700,000 (more than Lisbon).

Portuguese descendants make up a significant minority in the former colonies where, they make up the bulk of Mestiços (Mixed African-European people).

=== Europe outside of Portugal ===
==== France, Belgium, Luxembourg, Monaco, Andorra and Switzerland ====
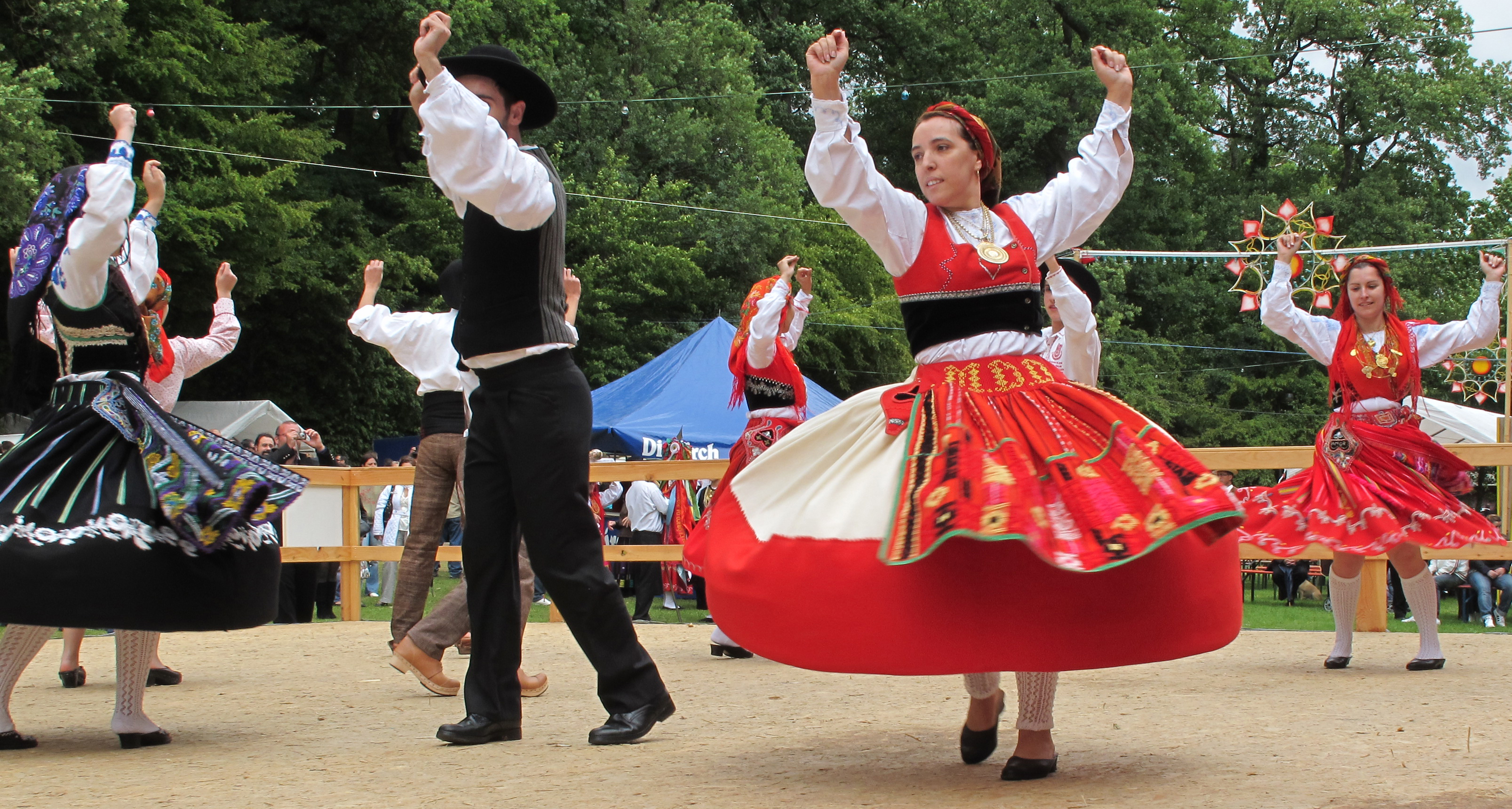
Portuguese folk dancing in Kockelscheuer.

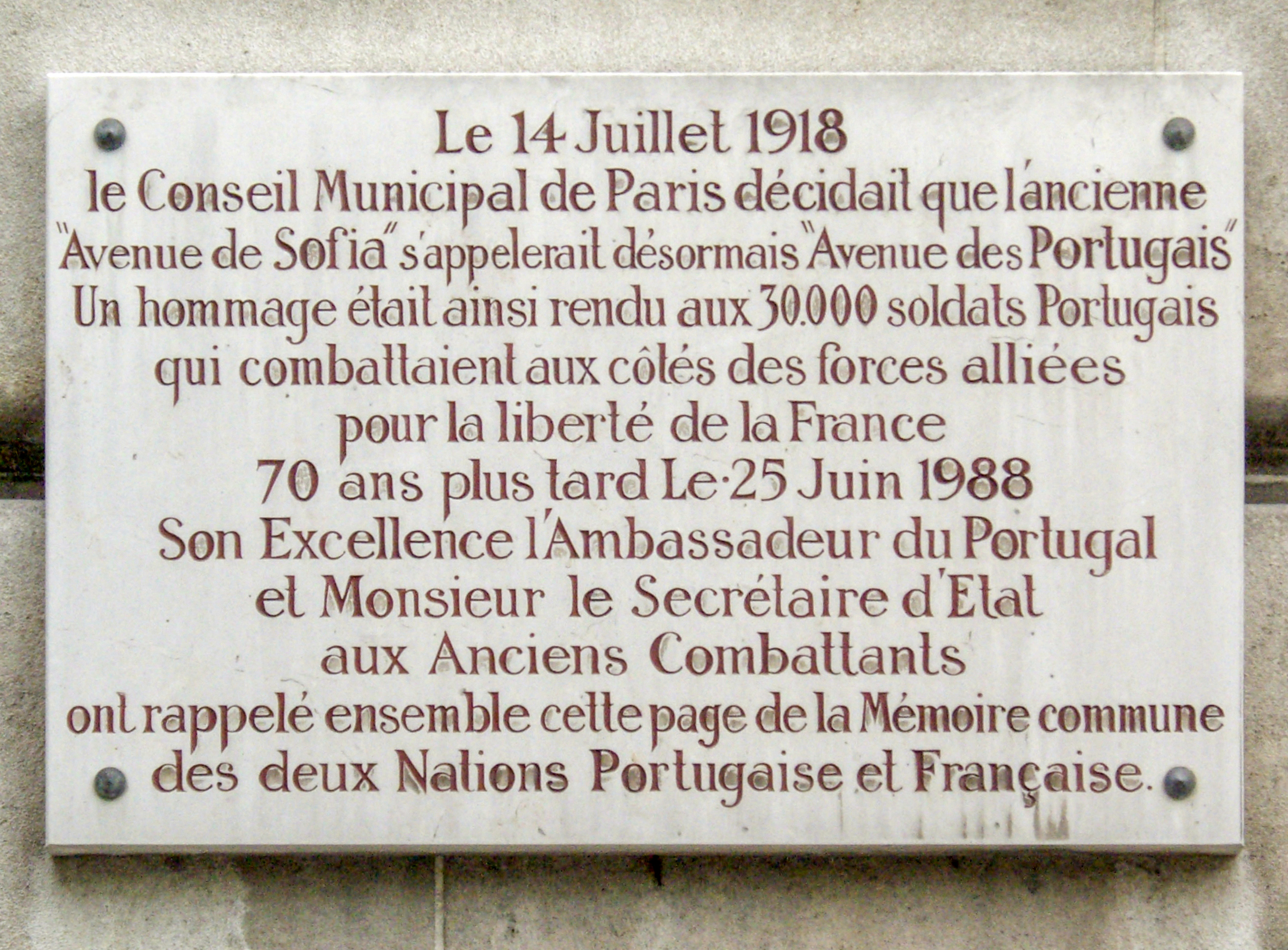
Commemorative plaque on the Portuguese.avenue (Avenue des Portugais) in Paris

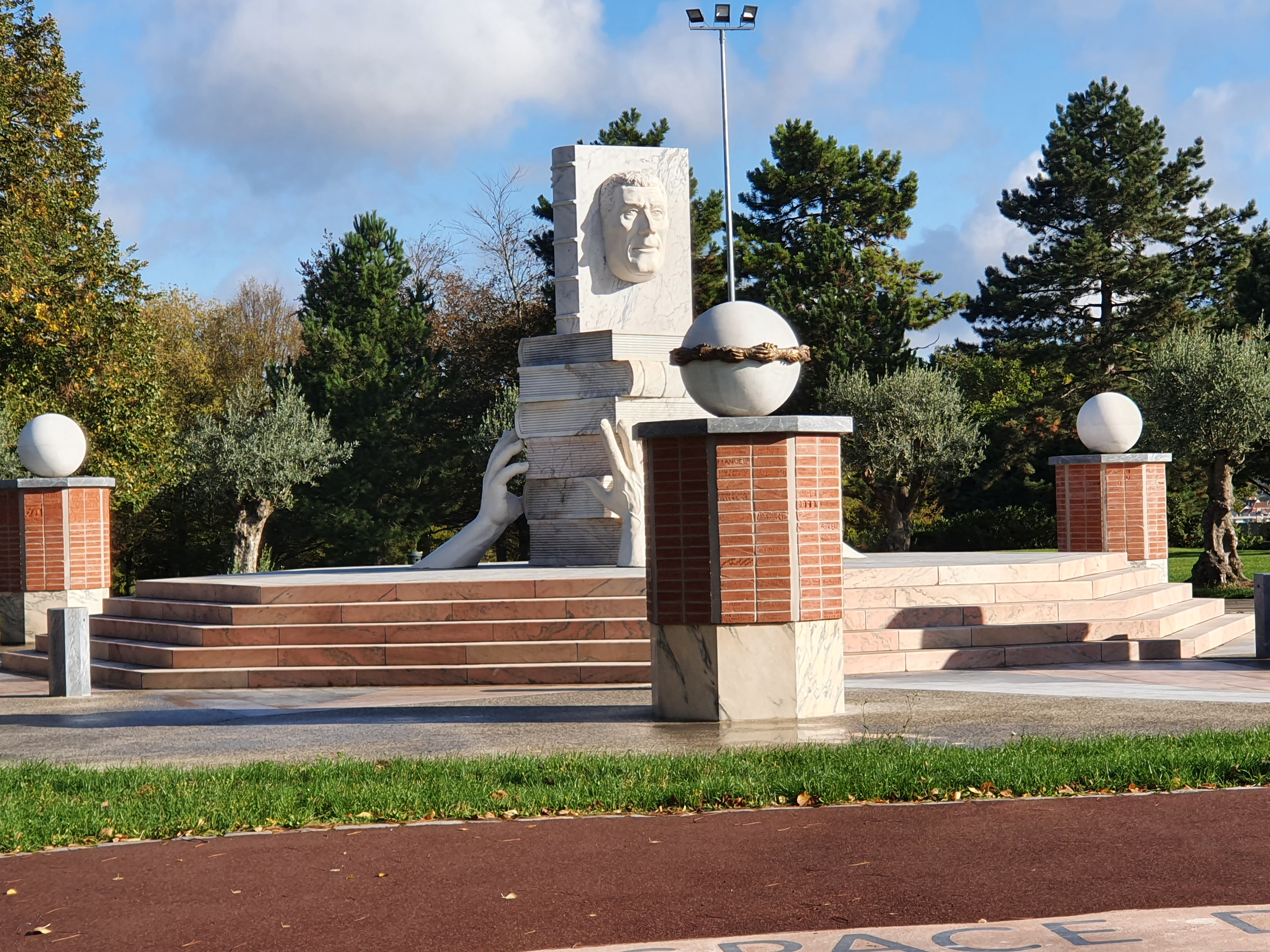
Champigny-sur-Marne Portuguese monument (Monument des Portugais)

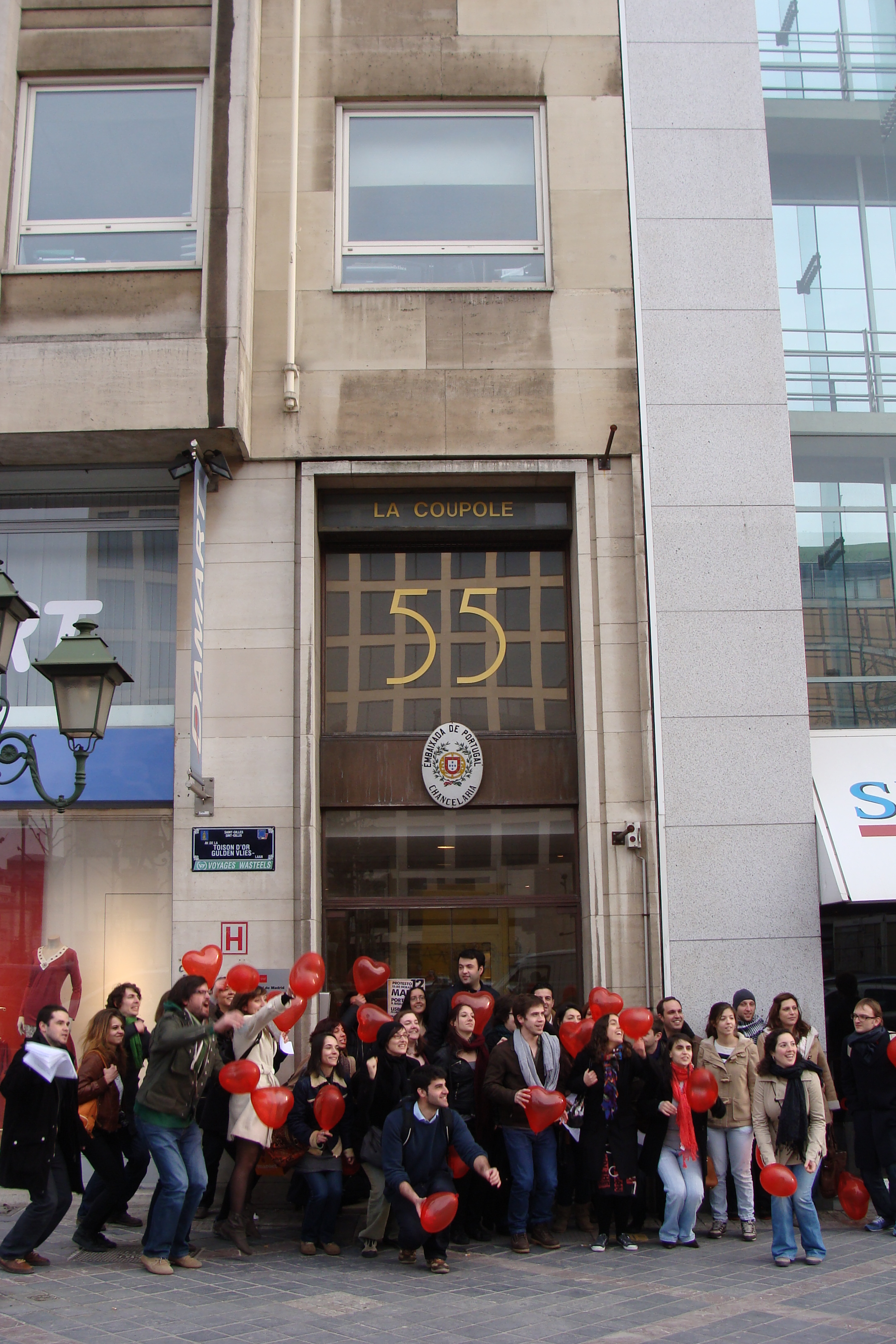
Portuguese in front of their embassy in Brussels, Belgium

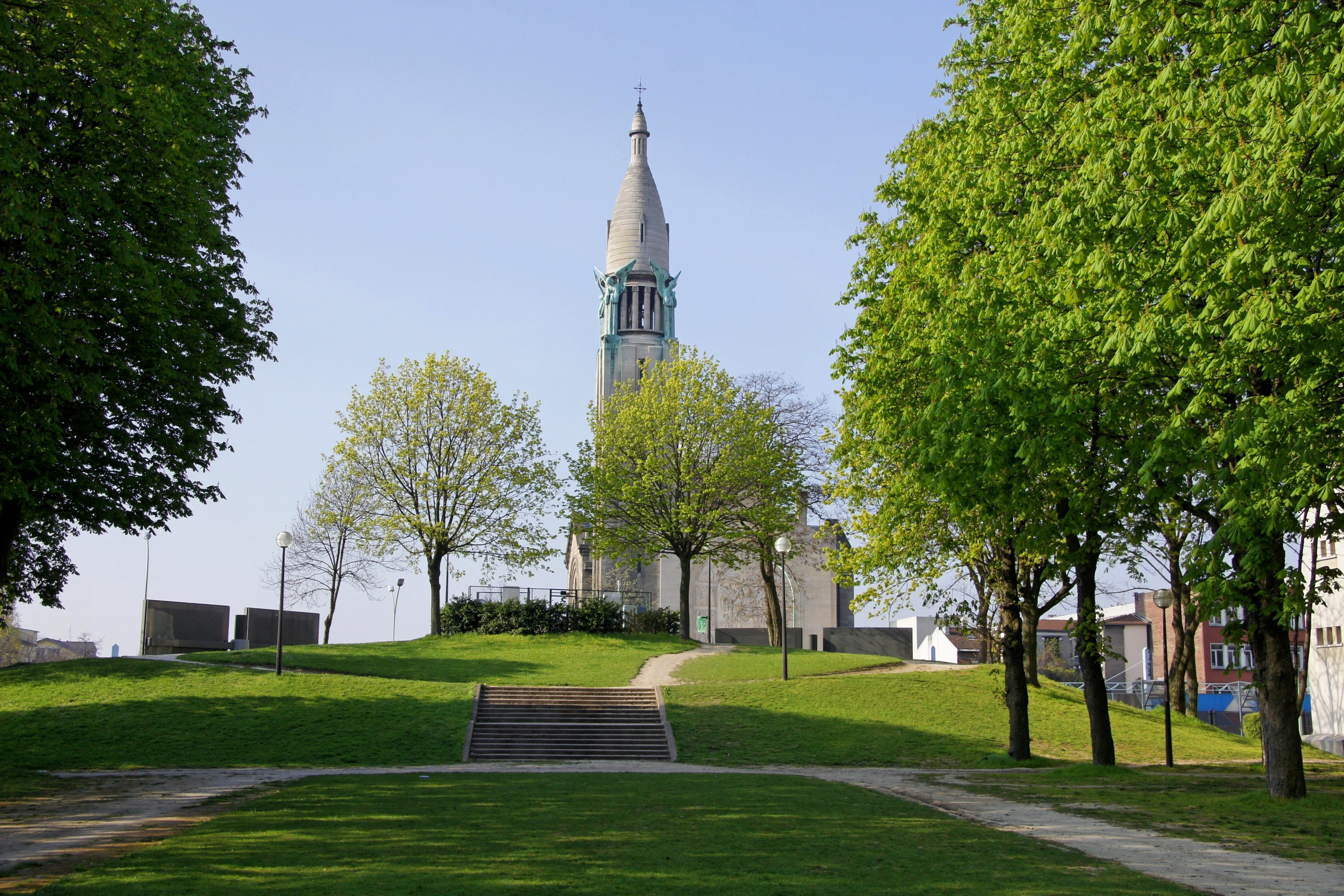
Portuguese catholic church in Gentilly, seen from the Cité Internationale Universitaire de Paris

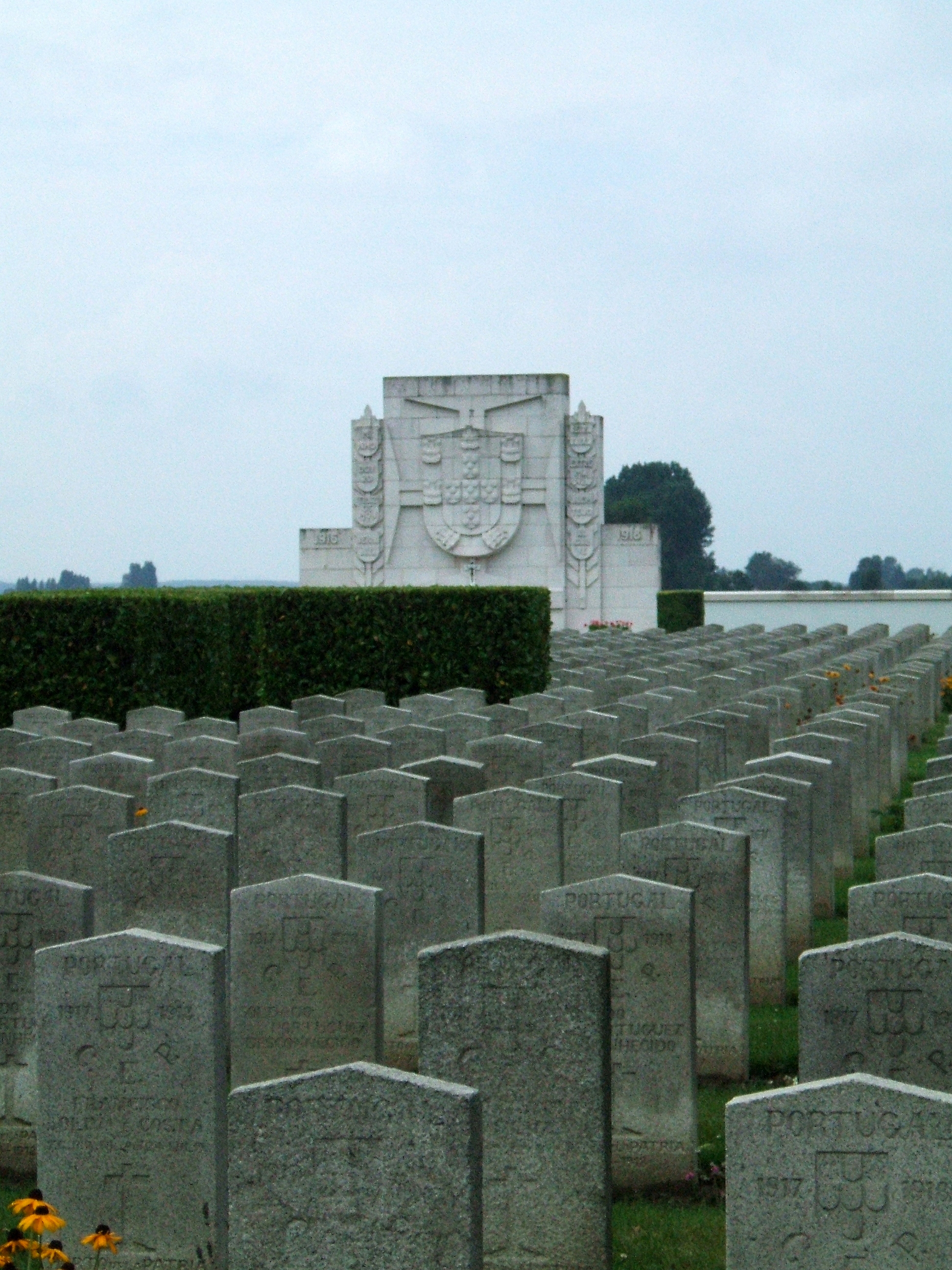
Portuguese Military Cemetery in Richebourg, France

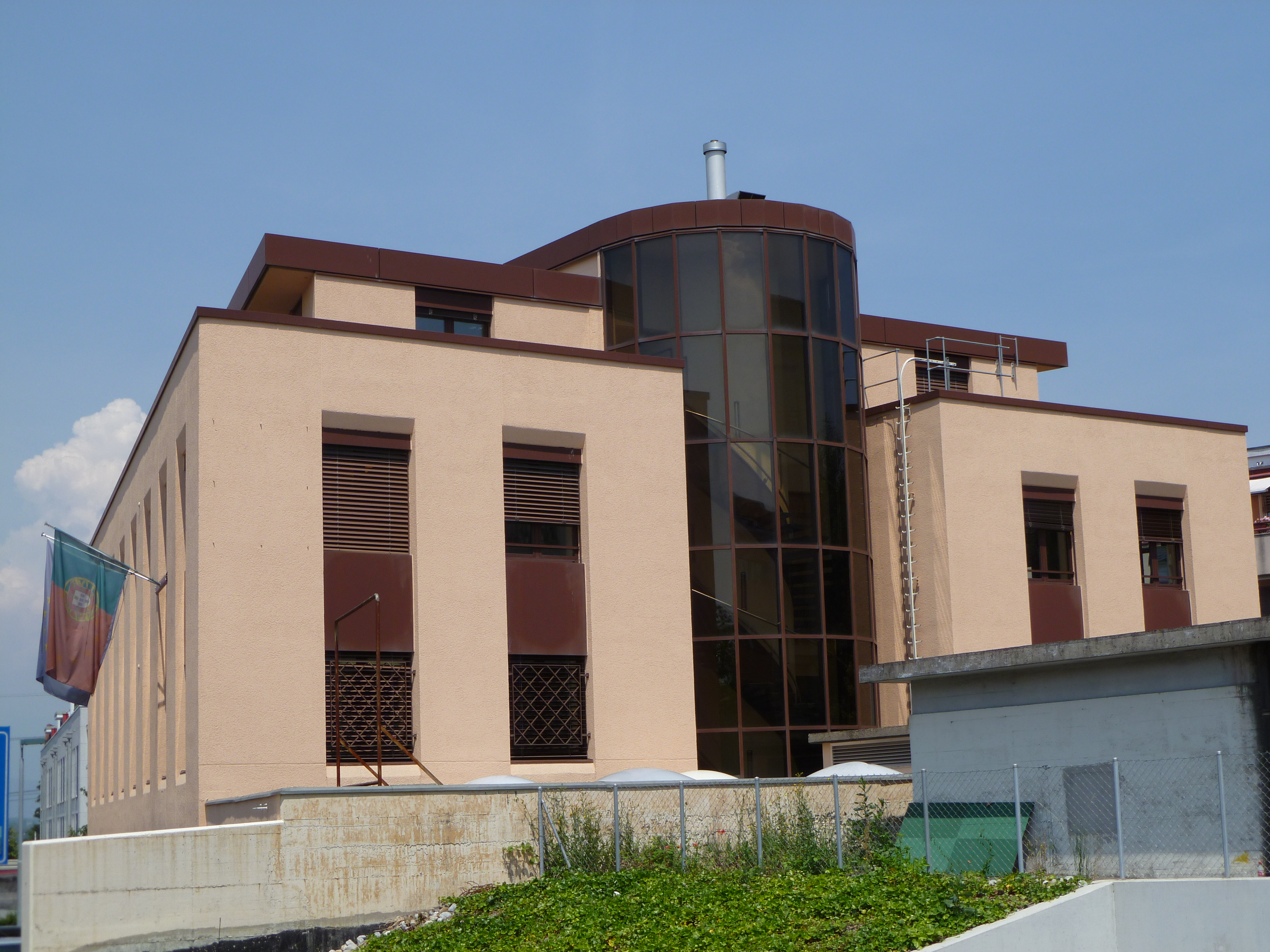
Portuguese consulate in Geneva

Due to the linguistic similarity between Portuguese and French and the many schools in Portugal that promote French as foreign language, many Portuguese nationals started migrating to France, Belgium, Luxembourg, Monaco and the French-speaking part of Switzerland in the 1960s, for economic reasons, and to avoid conscription to fight in Portuguese colonies. Interestingly, migration to Andorra - where, although Catalan is the official language, French is widely spoken - made the Portuguese the third largest ethnic group in the state, after Andorrans and Spaniards.

Around 15% of Portuguese people are fluent in French. French has been dwindling, often replaced by English. In 2005 French fluency stood at 24%. Nevertheless, 70% of middle school students study French. French media are widely available in Portugal (newspapers, magazines, radio stations and TV channels) and many libraries offer a French-language section.

Portuguese migration to the more affluent French speaking countries in Europe continues, although at a lower rate.

More than 2,260,000 Portuguese citizens live in these countries. In addition, France alone hosts 450,000 Luso-descendants.

Records of Portuguese living in France date to the early centuries of the Portuguese kingdom, notably merchants, Portuguese-Jews and Portuguese nobles: Louis XIV was of Portuguese descent through his grandfather Philip II. Despite a centuries-long presence, Portuguese nationals only started to move to France in large numbers following World War 2.

From the 1960s, Brazil's economic stagnation, French efforts to attract Portuguese workers, and António de Oliveira Salazar's dictatorship and the colonial wars were factors that contributed to 1,000,000 people migrating to France from 1960 to 1974. After 1974, Portuguese nationals started moving to Luxembourg and Monaco (1980s), Switzerland (1990s) and – Belgium and Andorra (2000s). This is also due to France's tightened immigration control.

Portuguese constitute 23.4% of Luxembourg's population, second to native Luxembourgers; the Luxembourgers of Portuguese blood speak Letzeburgesch and Standard German, aside from French. Andorra is inhabited by 16,300 Portuguese nationals (19.4% of the population), Monaco hosts around 1,000 (3.3% of the Population), while Belgium is home to around 80,000 (0.7% of the population).

In Switzerland, Portuguese settled mainly in Romandy. Official figures suggest that Portuguese is spoken by 5% of the population at home and 10.1% in French speaking Switzerland, thus making Portuguese second only to French.

Notable Portuguese Swiss include snooker player Alexander Ursenbacher, models Pedro Mendes and Nomi Fernandes, actress Yaël Boon and Olympic medalist Stéphane Lambiel.

Notable Portuguese Belgians include – nobles such as Queen Elizabeth or King Leopold III, fashion designer Veronique Branquinho, footballer Yannick Carrasco, actress Rose Bertram, sprinter Jonathan Sacoor, and actress Helena Noguerra.

Portuguese migration towards these countries has steadily declined over the years, although from 2003 to 2022 around 615,000 Portuguese nationals migrated there, especially following the 2008 financial crisis. As of 2021 around 40% had returned to Portugal, as the economic outlook improved.

Portuguese immigrants to Belgium, France, Luxembourg, and Switzerland (2022 data for Belgium missing)
	2003–2006	2007–2010	2011–2014	2015–2018	2019–2022	Total
Switzerland	50,346	59,329	69,172	40,438	33,608	252,893
France	39,960	33,708	68,216	40,345	28,967	211,196
Luxembourg	14,956	16,605	18,592	16,723	14,556	81,432
Belgium	7,694	11,064	14,693	11,297	9,029	53,777
Andorra	7,167	3,204	1,067	1,122	884	13,444
Total	120,123	123,910	171,740	109,925	87,044	612,742

==== Germany ====
After WWII hundreds of thousands of Portuguese settled as guest workers in Western European countries. On 17 March 1964, the recruitment agreement between the Federal Republic of Germany and Portugal was signed under the Erhard I cabinet. Armando Rodrigues de Sá was officially welcomed in 1964 as the millionth "guest worker" in Germany and was given a certificate and a two-seater Zündapp Sport Combinette – Mokick. The number of Portuguese citizens living in Germany was estimated at 245,000 as of 2021. The largest Portuguese community is located in Hamburg numbering about 25,000. A Portugiesenviertel (Portuguese quarter) in Hamburg sits near the Port of Hamburg and between the subway stations of Landungsbrücken and Baumwall.

==== United Kingdom ====
In the United Kingdom, people of Portuguese origin were estimated at 400,000 in 2021. Other sources claim as many as 500,000 Portuguese there, considerably higher than the estimated 170,000 Portuguese-born people residing in the country in 2021 (excluding British-born people of Portuguese descent).

In areas such as Thetford and the crown dependencies of Jersey and Guernsey, Portuguese form the largest ethnic minority groups at 30%.

London is home to the largest group of Portuguese in the UK, with the majority settling in the Western boroughs of Kensington and Chelsea, Lambeth and Westminster.

=== Brazil ===
Portuguese emigration to Brazil from the beginning of colonization, in 1500 to Present
Source: Brazilian Institute for Geography and Statistics (IBGE)
	Decade												
Nationality	1500–1700	1701–1760	1808–1817	1827–1829	1837–1841	1856–1857	1881–1900	1901–1930	1931–1950	1951–1960	1961–1967	1981–1991	1991–2023
Portuguese	100,000	600,000	24,000	2,004	629	16,108	316,204	754,147	148,699	235,635	54,767	4,605	400,000

==== Colonial period ====
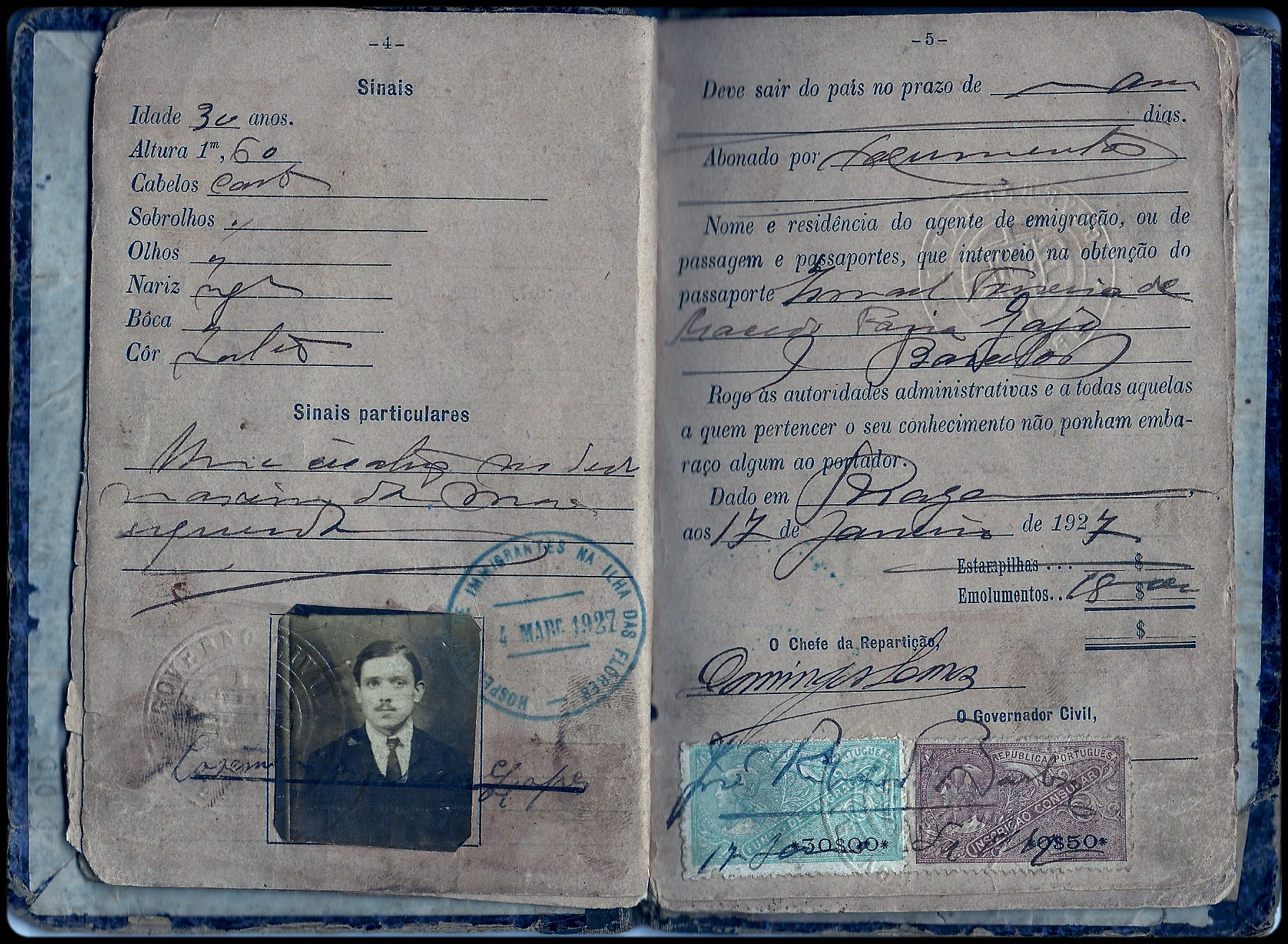
Passport of an immigrant from the Braga District to Brazil

Portuguese are the largest European immigrant group in Brazil. In colonial times, over 700,000 Portuguese settled there, mostly during the 18th century gold rush. Brazil received more European settlers during its colonial era than any other country in the Americas. Between 1500 and 1760, about 700,000 Europeans immigrated to Brazil, compared to 530,000 to the US. They were the only significant migrants to the country during the colonial era, despite French and Dutch invasions. The Portuguese migration was predominantly men. The Jesuits asked the Portuguese King to send any kind of Portuguese women to Brazil, even the socially undesirable (e.g. prostitutes or women with mental maladies), if necessary. The Crown responded by sending groups of orphans to marry nobles and peasants alike.

They included many Órfãs do Rei (orphans of the king) of what was considered "good birth". They were noble and non-noble maidens, often daughters of soldiers killed in battle or noblemen who died overseas and whose upbringing was paid by the Crown. Bahia's port in the East received one of the first groups of orphans in 1551. Portuguese men also competed successfully for local women with slaves and indigenous peoples. Their better quality of life and lower mortality rate were important advantages. Then, even though the 700,000 Portuguese colonial migration was smaller than 3.2 million indigenous inhabitants and the 4.8million Africans, their descendants numbered as many as the "non-white" population in the early 19th century. After independence from Portugal in 1822, around 1.7 million additional Portuguese immigrants settled there.

==== Post-independence ====
Portuguese immigration in the 19th and 20th centuries was marked by its concentration in São Paulo and Rio de Janeiro. The immigrants opted mostly for urban centers. Portuguese women began to migrate independently, although even at the turn of the 20th century, 319 men came for each 100 women. The Portuguese were different from Germans or Italians who brought many more women with them. Despite the small female proportion, Portuguese men typically chose Portuguese women, while female immigrants rarely married indigenous men. Portuguese endogamy was higher than any other European immigrant community, behind only the Japanese.

Many Portuguese-Brazilians identified as Brazilian, perhaps encouraged by the dominance of Portuguese culture there.

In 1872, 3.7 million Whites lived in Brazil (the vast majority of Portuguese ancestry), along with 4.1 million mixed-race people (mostly of Portuguese-African-Amerindian ancestry) and 1.9 million Blacks. Thus 80% of Brazilians had at least partial Portuguese ancestry in the 1870s.

In the late 19th and early 20th centuries, a new large wave of Portuguese immigrants arrived, including over 1.5 million Portuguese from 1881 to 1991. In 1906, for example, 133,393 Portuguese-born people lived in Rio de Janeiro, comprising 16% of the city's population. Rio remains the largest "Portuguese city" outside of Portugal, with 1% Portuguese natives. Because of the independence of Portuguese overseas provinces after the Carnation Revolution in 1974, a new wave of Portuguese settlers arrived in Brazil until the late 1970s as refugees from Portugal and the newly independent countries of Angola and Mozambique..

==== Genetic evidence ====
Genetic studies confirm the strong Portuguese genetic influence. At least half of the Brazilian population's male inheritance (based on Y chromosomes) comes from Portugal. Black Brazilians have an average of 48% non-African genes, mostly with Portuguese ancestors. By contrast, 33% Amerindian and 28% African contribution to the total female inheritance (mtDNA) of white Brazilians was found.

An autosomal study from 2013, with nearly 1300 samples from across Brazil, found a predominant degree of Portuguese ancestry. European ancestry was the most prevalent in all urban populations (with values from 51% to 74%, increasing northern to southern Brazil). Northern populations included a significant proportion of indigenous ancestry, twice the African contribution. In the northeast, centerwest and southeast, African ancestry exceeded them. All urban populations were highly admixed, and most of the variation was observed between individuals within each population.

A large, community-based multicenter autosomal study considered representative samples from three urban communities Salvador, Bambuí, and Pelotas, estimated European, mostly Iberian, ancestry to be 42.4%, 83.8% and 85.3%, respectively.

An estimated 5 million Brazilians (2.3% of the total) were eligible for Portuguese citizenship.

=== Oceania ===
==== Australia ====
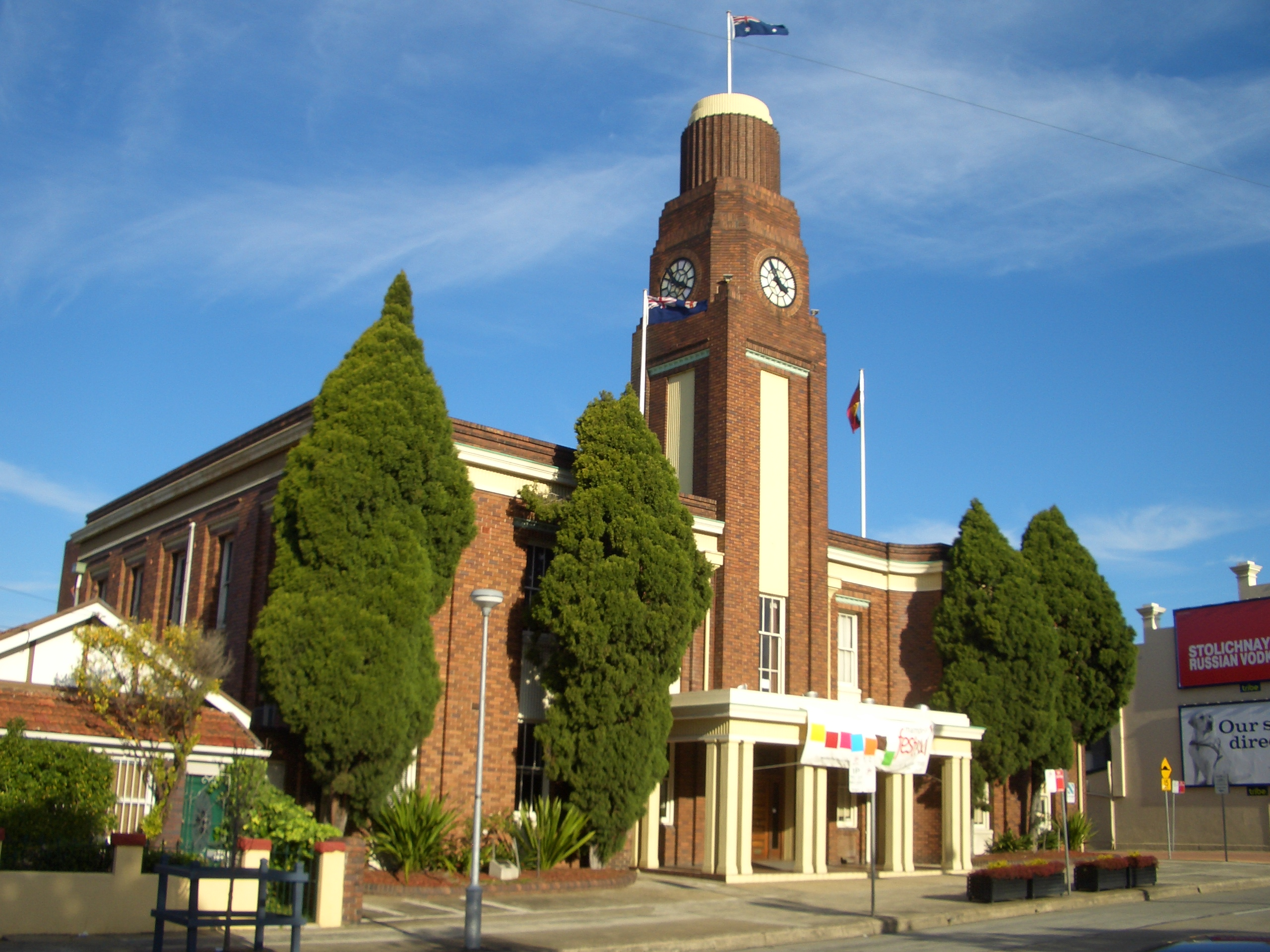
Petersham (Sydney) is a neighbourhood known for its extensive Portuguese commercial offerings

In Australia, although their numbers are smaller than the Greek and Italian communities, Portuguese are an active community. They were among the early European settlers, and might have discovered Australia. Portuguese immigration to Australia experienced a boom after the Carnation Revolution and the Indonesian Invasion of Timor-Leste. Portuguese spread across the country and even have a designated Portuguese neighborhood. The 74,000 people of Portuguese descent constitute about 0.28% of the population. Portuguese cuisine is popular, exemplified by restaurants such as Nando's, Oporto, and Ogalo. Pastel de nata is widely consumed. Many Portuguese are from Madeira. Notable Portuguese Australians include Naomi Sequeira, Kate DeAraugo, Junie Morosi, Lyndsey Rodrigues, Sophie Masson and Irina Dunn.

==== New Zealand ====
The community in New Zealand is much smaller and the 1,500 Portuguese people living there (although the numbers could be significantly higher) constitute about 0.03% of the population. On 22 April 2010, the Office of Ethnic Affairs officially recognized Portuguese New Zealanders as a distinct community, marked by tying the 70th ribbon to Parliament's mooring stone in the Parliament House Galleria. The Portuguese community organizes annual gatherings and celebrations, such as Portugal Day, and maintains a friendship association. Portuguese individuals were among the early settlers in New Zealand, although immigration declined gradually until the 1960s. After the Carnation Revolution, the community started to increase again.

==== New Caledonia ====
About 900 Portuguese live in the French collectivity of New Caledonia (0.38% of the population).

=== Asia ===
Portuguese influences are found throughout Asia, especially in Macau, Timor-Leste and India, all territories where the Portuguese maintained colonies.

==== Southeast Asia ====
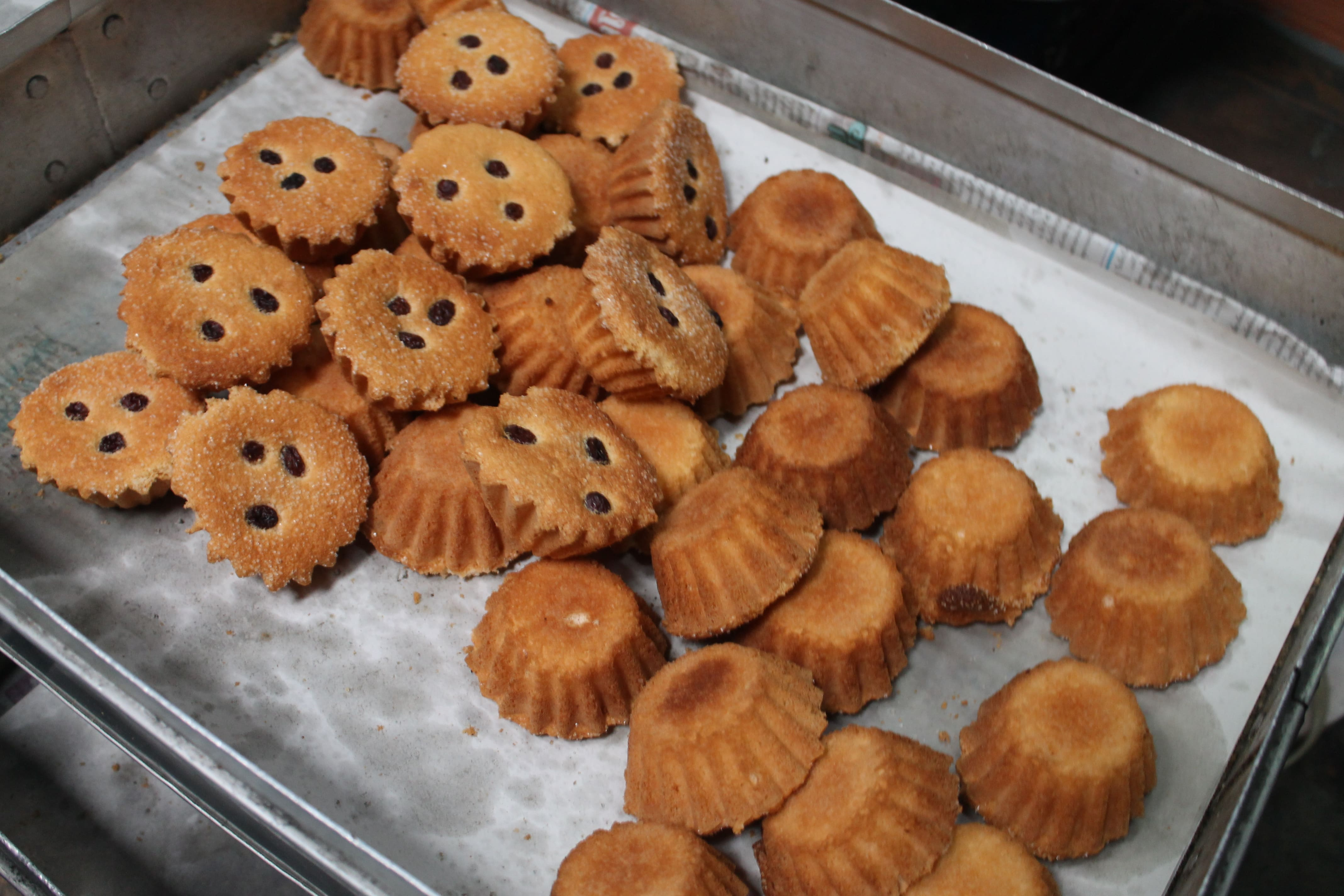
Khanom farang kudi chin, Thai-style cake influenced by Portuguese desserts

A Famosa, as well as the Historical centre of Malacca, is a remnant of the Portuguese presence now part of the Unesco World Heritage Sites.

Luso-Asian communities have had a presence in Southeast Asia since the 15th century. As a result of inter-ethnic marriage, Portuguese-based dialects have emerged in Malaysia and Singapore. Notable Kristangs include Kimberley Leggett, Jojo Sturys, Joan Margaret Marbeck, Elaine Daly, Nor Aliah Lee, Melissa Tan, Andrea Fonseka, Anna Jobling and Cheryl Samad. People of Portuguese descent from Singapore include Pilar Arlando, Mary Klass and Vernetta Lopez.

Other communities are found in Indonesia, with significant populations living in Lamno (the so-called "mata biru" or blue-eyed people), Aceh, Maluku Islands and Kampung Tugu. Portuguese vestiges include dozens of loanwords as well as the introduction of Latin Catholicism (3.12% of the population, but still the major religion in NTT) and Keroncong, similar to Portuguese cavaquinho. Many Portuguese Indonesians even intermarried with Indo people, who are Eurasians of partial Dutch descent. In recent years many Indonesians of Portuguese descent have been active in the entertainment industry such as Puteri Indonesia Elfin Pertiwi Rappa or actress Millane Fernandez. In the Philippines, actress Sophie Albert is another Portuguese-South Asian.

Communities of Portuguese descent are found in Myanmar and Thailand. In Thailand, during the reign of King Narai the Great the Portuguese community in Ayutthaya is thought to have peaked at 6,000 people. Notable Thai of Portuguese descent include Francis Chit, Maria Guyomar de Pinha, Kung Nang Pattamasuta, Krystal Vee, and Neon Issara.

==== Indian Subcontinent ====
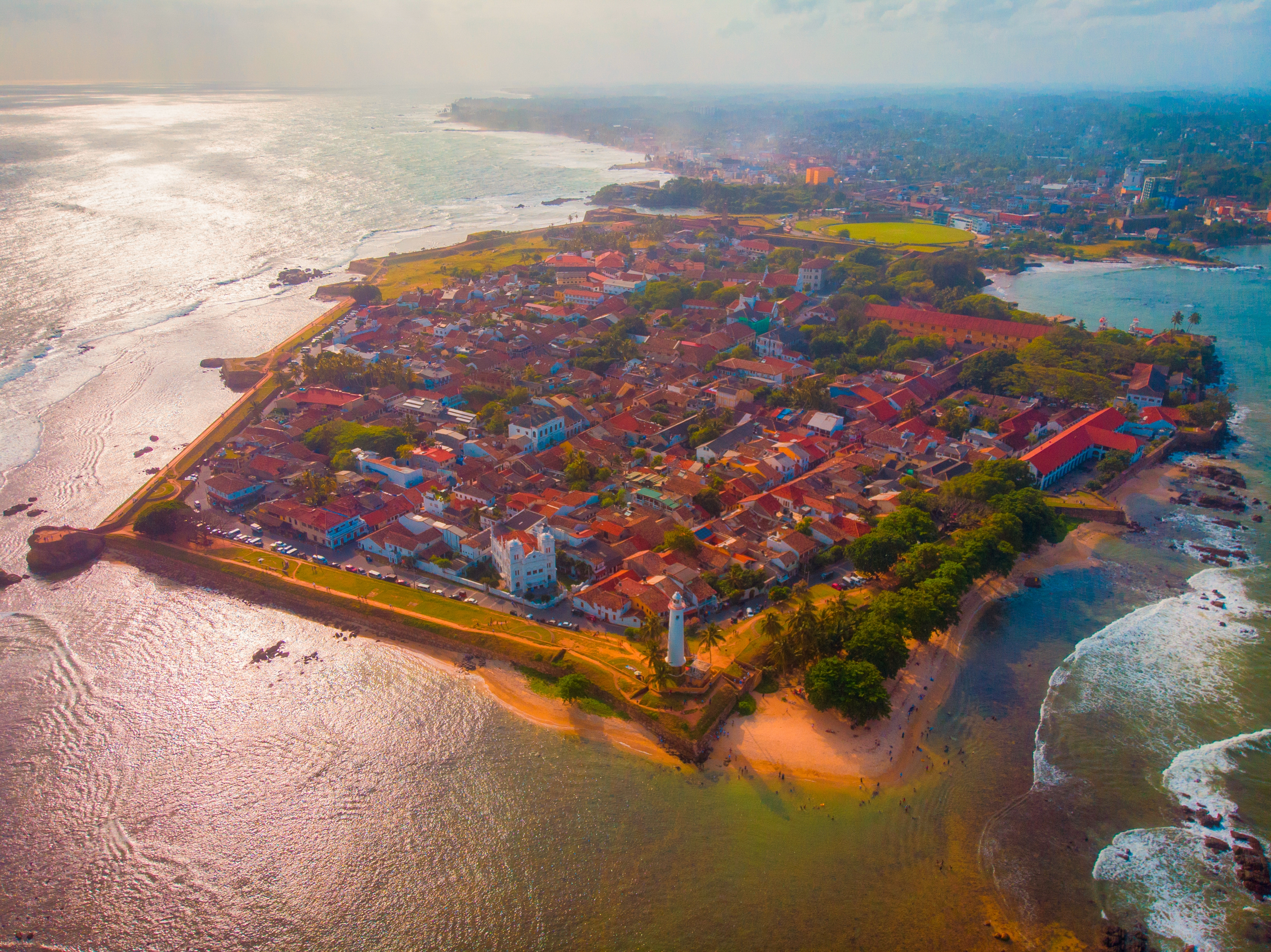
Aerial view of Galle Fort, built by the Portuguese in 1588 and now a Unesco World Heritage Site

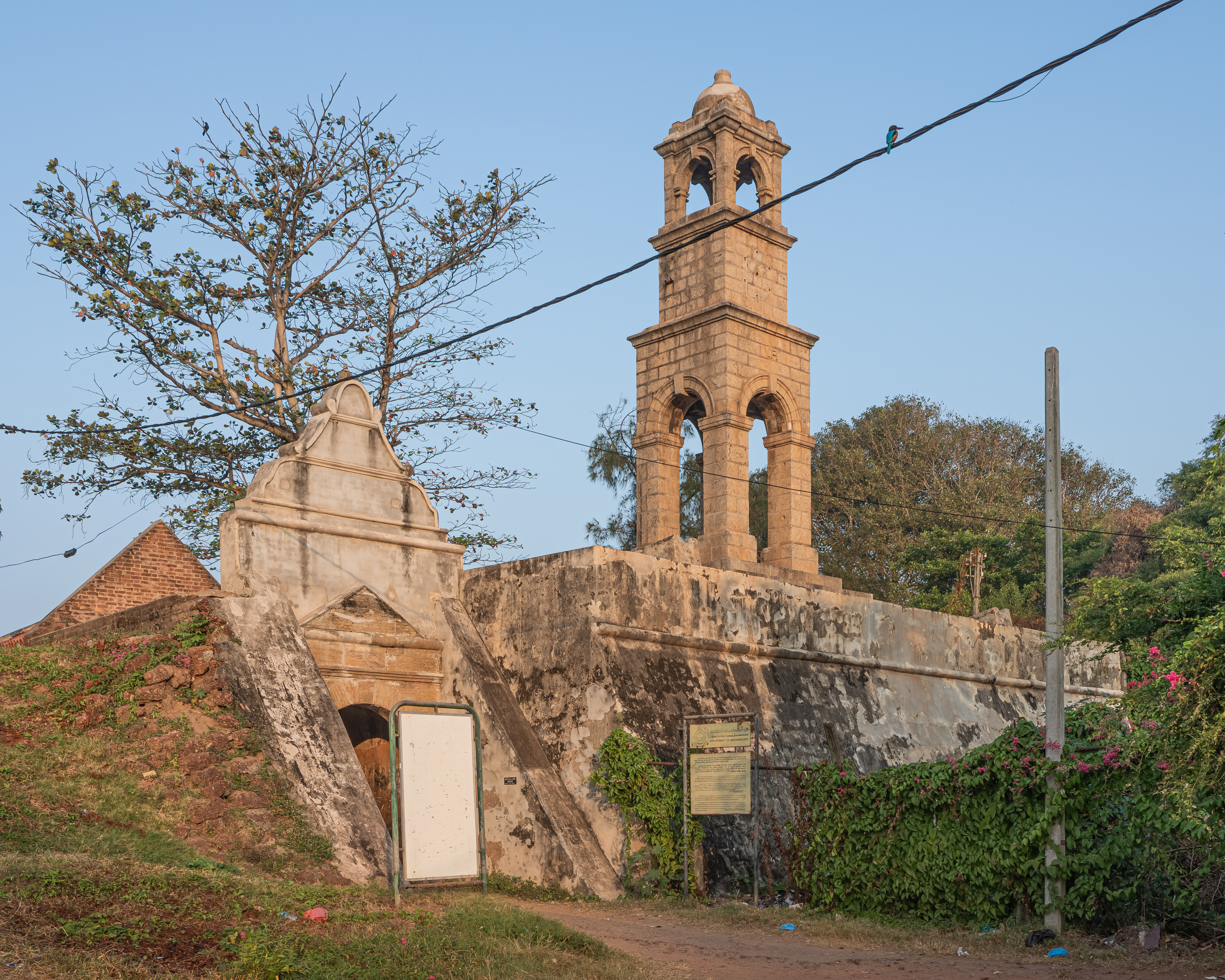
Negombo fort, that was built by the Portuguese to defend Colombo as a part of a defensive system all over the island.

Sri Lanka is home to around 40,000 Portuguese Burghers. A notable example is Rosemary Rogers. In addition, as a consequence of the Portuguese invasion of Sri Lanka, during the 16th and 17th centuries, many Portuguese language surnames were adopted among the Sinhalese. As a result, Perera and Fernando eventually became the most common surnames. Afro Sri-Lankans also retain a Portuguese identity. Major Portuguese contributions to Sri Lanka include 1,000 loanwords in Sinhala, Baila music (from the Portuguese bailar, meaning to dance), culinary innovations such as "Bolo di amor" (literally Love cake) or "Bolo Folhado" (literally Puff Pastry) as well as Latin Catholicism (approximately 6.1% of the population identifies as Catholic) and the endangered Sri Lankan Portuguese creole.

In Pakistan a small Portuguese community numbers about 64 people, even though other estimates point to 400 in Karachi. Notable Portuguese Pakistani include Dilshad Vadsaria and Bernadette Louise Dean. Before partition, it is estimated that the Goan community in Karachi numbered up to 15,000. The majority returned to Goa, to other Portuguese territories, or to the UK. The Portuguese community contributed to the musical scene of pre-partition Karachi. As of today, about 6,000 Goans remain in Pakistan, mainly in that city.

Portuguese heritage continues in Bangladesh: they were the first Europeans. The Portuguese introduced Catholicism, now professed by about 375,000 Bangladeshis. This heritage added more than 1,500 words to Bengali. In colonial times, the population may have reached 40,000 people before most resettled elsewhere. Those who remained integrated in Bangladeshi society. Notable examples of Portuguese influence in Bangladesh are their surnames, as well as Bangladesh's oldest church, the Holy Rosary Church in Dhaka. As of now, the Portuguese community in Bangladesh consists of a few expatriates and some descendants of the early settlers.

==== East Asia ====
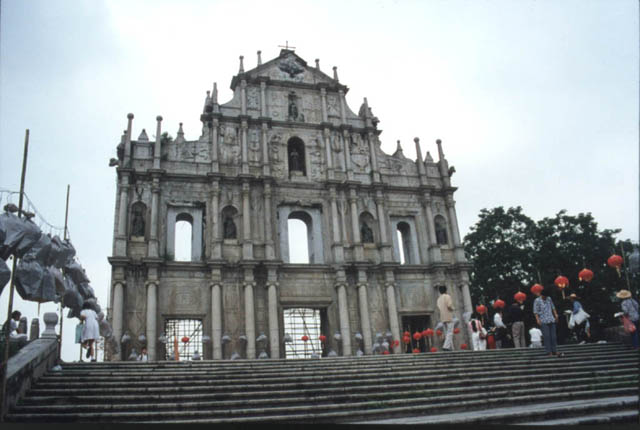
The Historic Centre of Macao, epitome of the Sino-Portuguese culture, is a Unesco World Heritage Site

A small but growing Portuguese community – consisting mainly of recent expats and numbering about 3,500 people – is found in Japan, South Korea, China and Taiwan, whose name in European texts until the 20th century – Formosa, meaning "beautiful (island)" – is Portuguese.

The most important Portuguese community in Eastern Asia is in Macau, which was a Portuguese colony until 1999. It harbors more than 150,000 Portuguese citizens, accounting for 22.34% of the total, the largest concentration of Portuguese nationals in Asia as well as one of the most important in the world. Notables include Germano Guilherme.

A 20,700 people-strong community continues in Hong Kong, mainly of Macanese descent. Notable people include Joe Junior, Michelle Reis, Rowan Varty, Rita Carpio and Ray Cordeiro.

=== Diaspora populations ===
Country	Population	% of country	Criterion
Portuguese in North America
Portuguese American	1,400,000	0.42%	
Portuguese Canadian	550,000	1.38%	
Portuguese in Bermuda	16,000	25%	
Portuguese in Jamaica	5,700	0.21%	
Portuguese in Saint Barthélemy	3,400	33%	
Portuguese in Panama	3,038	0.07%	
Portuguese in Curaçao	3,000	1.95%	
Portuguese in Mexico	2,500	0.002%	
Portuguese Aruba	2,000	1.8%	
Portuguese in Trinidad and Tobago	837	0.06%	
Portuguese in Saint Vincent and the Grenadines	753	0.68%	
Portuguese in Guadeloupe	426	0.11%	
Portuguese in the Dominican Republic	263	0.003%	
Portuguese in the Cayman Islands	130	0.18%	
Portuguese in Antigua and Barbuda	126	0.13%	
Portuguese in South America
Portuguese Brazilian	180,000,000	90% (2.5% children and grandchildren, eligible for Portuguese citizenship)	Brazilians with Portuguese ancestry, of which an estimated 5,400,000 children and grandchildren of Portuguese nationals (eligible for Portuguese citizenship)
Portuguese Venezuelan	1,300,000	4.59%	
Portuguese Peruvian	1,150,000	3.44%	
Portuguese Chilean	200,000	1%	
Portuguese Argentine	42,000	0.09%	
Portuguese Uruguayan	13,000	0.37%	
Portuguese Guyanese	2,000	0.27%	
Portuguese in Colombia	800	0.002%	
Portuguese in Europe
Portuguese French	1,720,000–2,000,000	2.53%–2.94%	
Portuguese in Switzerland	460,173	5.24%	
Portuguese British	400,000–500,000	0.60–0.75%	
Portuguese in Germany	244,217	0.29%	
Portuguese in Spain	184,774	0.39%	
Portuguese Luxembourger	151,028	23.4%	
Portuguese in Belgium	80,000	0.68%	
Portuguese in the Netherlands	35,779	0.20%	
Portuguese in Andorra	16,308	20.12%	
Portuguese in Jersey	15,000	9.03%	
Portuguese in Ireland	10,516	0.19%	
Portuguese in Norway	9,000	0.16%	
Portuguese in Italy	8,288	0.01%	
Portuguese in Austria	7,245	0.08%	
Portuguese in Sweden	4,953	0.05%	
Portuguese in Denmark	4,476	0.08%	
Portuguese in Gibraltar	3,450	10%	
Portuguese in Poland	3,000	0.01%	
Portuguese in Romania	2,652	0.01%	
Portuguese in the Czech Republic	2,202	0.02%	
Portuguese in Guernsey	2,000	3.13%	
Portuguese in Finland	1,521	0.02%	
Portuguese in Iceland	1,406	0.38%	
Portuguese in Monaco	1,008	2.57%	
Portuguese in Liechtenstein	969	2.44%	
Portuguese in Greece	962	0.01%	
Portuguese in Bulgaria	818	0.01%	
Portuguese in Hungary	689	0.01%	
Portuguese in Moldova	670	0.03%	
Portuguese in Ukraine	502	0.001%	
Portuguese in Asia (see Luso-Asian)
Luso-Indian	200,000–1,000,000	0.01–0.07%	
Portuguese in Macau	152,616	22.34%	
Portuguese in Myanmar	100,000	0.18%	
Portuguese in Sri Lanka	5,000–40,000	0.02–0.18%	
Portuguese in Malaysia	40,000	0.12%	
Portuguese in East Timor	20,853	1.58%	
Portuguese in Hong Kong	20,700	0.27%	
Portuguese in Singapore	17,000	0.31%	
Portuguese in Saudi Arabia	7,971	0.02%	
Portuguese in Turkey	4,364	0.01%	
Portuguese in the UAE	4,000	0.04%	
Portuguese in Israel	3,575	0.04%	
Portuguese in Thailand	1,600–3,500	~0.01%	
Portuguese in Lebanon	3,400	0.06%	
Portuguese in Qatar	2,293	0.08%	
Portuguese in China	2,022	0.0001%	
Portuguese in Japan	746	0.0004%	
Portuguese in the Philippines	623	0.001%	
Portuguese in Oceania
Portuguese Australian	73,903	0.28%	
Portuguese New Zealander	1,500	0.03%	
Portuguese in New Caledonia	900	0.33%	
Portuguese in Africa (see Luso-African)
Portuguese South African	700,000	1.16%	
Portuguese Angolan	500,000	1.51%	
Portuguese Mozambicans	200,000	0.62%	
Portuguese in Cape Verde	22,318	3.96%	
Portuguese in Malawi	19,000	0.09%	
Portuguese in Zimbabwe	18,000	0.12%	
Portuguese in Guinea Bissau	10,400	0.63%	
Portuguese in the DRC	6,400	0.01%	
Portuguese Zambians	5,700	0.03%	
Portuguese Namibians	4,783	0.19%	
Portuguese in São Tomé and Príncipe	4,765	2.22%	
Portuguese Ethiopians	3,000	0.003%	
Portuguese in Senegal	2,800	0.02%	
Portuguese in Morocco	2,445	0.01%	
Portuguese in Congo	1,431	0.02%	
Portuguese in Eswatini	1,300	0.11%	
Portuguese in Tanzania	1,185	0.002%	
Portuguese in Kenya	906	0.002%	
Portuguese in Algeria	515	0.001%	
Total in diaspora	~70,000,000		
Portugal	10,467,366		Statistics Portugal (2022) Figure is only a population estimate of all residents of Portugal, and includes people of non-Portuguese ethnic origin

== Literature ==
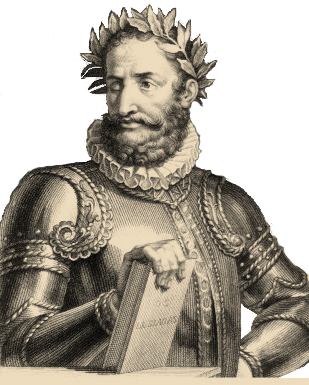
Luís de Camões, one of the greatest poets of the European literary tradition. His epic poem Os Lusíadas ranks among the finest works of world literature

Portuguese literature has a long and varied history, with roots in the Middle Ages. In the 16th century, Portugal's literature entered its "Golden Age", during which time poets such as Luís de Camões and Francisco de Sá de Miranda were renowned. Portuguese is often referred as to the "língua de Camões" (Camões's language), highlighting this author's importance in forging the national identity.

Portuguese authors from the Age of Discovery include Públia Hortênsia de Castro, Gomes Eanes de Zurara, Joana Vaz, Fernão Mendes Pinto (author of Peregrinação), Joana da Gama, Fernão Lopes and Violante do Céu.

19th authors included Almeida Garrett, who is credited with founding modern Portuguese literature. His writings reflect the political and social revolutions then taking place in Portugal, and his writing style is recognized as original.

Authors such as Fernando Pessoa and Guerra Junqueiro gained international acclaim for their writings in the 20th century. Literary production mushroomed.

Modern authors such as Nobel Laureate José Saramago and António Lobo Antunes. These authors write about identity, culture, and society.

Other notable Portuguese authors include Ana Vicente, Richard Zimler, Ana Plácido, Mário Cesariny, Ana Hatherly, Cesário Verde, Isabel Stilwell, Miguel Torga, Ana de Castro Osório, Alves Redol, Maria Archer, Antero de Quental, Isabel Alçada, Wenceslau de Moraes, Vimala Devi, Alexandre Herculano, Dulce Maria Cardoso, Maria Gabriela Llansol, Abel Botelho, Fernanda Botelho, Isabel da Nóbrega, Rita Vilela, Maria Gabriela Llansol and Natália Correia, Matilde Campilho, and Ana Daniel.

Susan Lowndes Marques, writer and journalist, was a leading figure in the Portuguese-British community in Lisbon, and promoted Portugal in the UK.

== Law and Justice ==
Portugal created a legal system for its colonies, with traces visible in international law.

Portugal has contributed to human rights law. The European Convention on Human Rights, which was established in 1950 with the purpose of defending human rights and basic freedoms, was championed by Portugal.

Portuguese active in the field of Law and Justice include Paula Teixeira da Cruz (previous Minister of Justice), Boaventura de Sousa Santos GOSE (one of the most prominent Portuguese living left-wing intellectuals. ), Susana Amador, Henrique O'Neill, Maria Santos Pais (served as Special Representative of the United Nations Secretary-General on Violence against Children), Januário Lourenço (invented the Electronic Power of Attorney and the Electronic Divorce.), Isabel Oneto, Guilherme d'Oliveira Martins, Heloísa Apolónia and António Vitorino (former European Commissioner for Justice and Home Affairs).

== Science and technology ==
Research and development (R&D) is conducted mainly by state universities and autonomous state research institutes. However, non-state research institutes and some private projects also operate.

During the Age of Discovery technical requirements for navigation were a topic of great importance. Portuguese contributions to the scientific world included the Caravel – a light and fast ship designed for coastal navigation and the Portolan – a maritime map used from the early Middle Ages. The Portuguese also introduced the Compass rose on maps and for guidance and navigation devices such as the cross-staff, nonius, the nautical astrolabe, and the Black Maple Sword.

João Faras named the Southern Cross while Francisco de Pina, in Asia invented the modern Vietnamese alphabet (Quốc ngữ). Botanist João de Loureiro also worked in Vietnam.

One of the oldest learned societies of Portugal, the Lisbon Academy of Sciences, was founded in 1779. During this time the Passarola was conceived. Natural philosopher Jean Hyacinthe de Magellan was active. Bento de Moura Portugal improved Thomas Savery's steam engine.

In 1792 Portugues founded the oldest engineering school of Latin America (Real Academia de Artilharia, Fortificação e Desenho), as well as the oldest medical college of Asia (Escola Médico-Cirúrgica de Goa) in 1842.

During the late 19th century Bartolomeu de Gusmão introduced the Pyreliophore and Maximiliano Augusto Herrmann developed the Herrmann wall telephone. Spectrography pioneer Francisco Miranda da Costa Lobo and telectroscope pioneer Adriano de Paiva were active.

In 1949, neurologist António Egas Moniz, an early developer of cerebral angiography, was awarded the Nobel Prize in Medicine.

Other contributions include the drug Zebinix, the All-on-4 method (dentistry), the Multibanco, the Coloradd and the prepaid mobile phone.

Instituto Gulbenkian de Ciência (IGC), an international centre for biomedical research, was founded in 1961 and ranked as one of the Top Ten places for post-docs, by The Scientist. Champalimaud Foundation focuses on neuroscience and oncology. International Iberian Nanotechnology Laboratory operates in Braga.

In 2001 Portugal ranked 28th among countries for contributions to the top 1% of the world's highly cited publications. Portugal ranked 32nd in the 2022 Global Innovation Index.

Portugal has full membership and citizens working in pan-European scientific organizations such as European Space Agency (ESA), European Laboratory for Particle Physics (CERN), ITER, and the European Southern Observatory (ESO). From 2005–2007, Portugal was the EU member state with the highest growth rate in research and development (R&D) investment as a percentage of GDP at 46%, totaling 1.2% of GDP. This ranked 15th among the 27 EU member states in 2007.

Notable Portuguese people who made important contributions to science and technology:

- Agronomy (Alexandre Rodrigues Ferreira)
- Anthropology (Miguel Vale de Almeida, Jill Rosemary Dias, Leopoldina Ferreira Paulo, Teresa Joaquim)
- Astronomy (Paulo Freire)
- Astrophysics (David Sobral)
- Biochemistry (Sónia Rocha, Mónica Bettencourt-Dias, Helena Santos)
- Biology (Rolanda Matos)
- Botany (António Xavier Pereira Coutinho, Rosette Batarda Fernandes, Seomara da Costa Primo)
- Chemical engineering (Alírio Rodrigues, Isabel Gago, Armando J. L. Pombeiro)
- Chemistry (Roberto Duarte Silva, Branca Edmée Marques)
- Computer science (Diogo Vasconcelos, Fernando Boavida, Pedro Pedrosa Mendes, Isabel Cruz)
- Economics (Francisco Luís Gomes, Moisés Bensabat Amzalak, Rita Almeida, Lúcio Mauro Vinhas de Souza)
- Ethnology (António dos Santos Graça),
- Fluid dynamics (Silvana Cardoso)
- Geography (Orlando Ribeiro)
- Geology (Léon Paul Choffat, Venceslau de Lima, Carlos Ribeiro)
- Immunology (Benedita Barata da Rocha)
- Malariology (Maria Manuel Mota)
- Marine biology (Alexandra Cunha)
- Medical analysis (Mortó Sitarama Dessai)
- Metereology (Ilda Aurora Pinheiro de Moura Machado)
- Mycology (Mathilde Bensaude)
- Neuroscience (Megan Carey, Paula Isabel da Silva Moreira, Susana Lima, Ana Domingos, Hanna Damasio)
- Nuclear physics (Lidia Salgueiro)
- Paleontology (Miguel Telles Antunes)
- Pathology (Fátima Carneiro)
- Pharmaceutical Science (Luís Prista)
- Planning theory (Elisabete A. Silva)
- Primatology (Claudia Sousa)
- Protein Crystallography (Maria Arménia Carrondo)
- Psychology (Armindo Freitas-Magalhães, Ana Cristina Silva)
- Physics (José Mendes, Luís Amaral)
- Oncobiology (Raquel Seruca)
- Romance philology (Karoline Michaelis)
- Somnology (Teresa Paiva)
- Systems theory (Tessaleno Devezas)
- Theoretical physics (Pedro Vieira, João Penedones)

Other notable Portuguese scientists include:

- Corino Andrade – initially described familial amyloidotic polyneuropathy
- Odette Ferreira – identified HIV-2
- Froilano de Mello – 20th century medical researcher and biologist
- Graça Freitas GCM – Director-General of Health during the Covid pandemic
- Diogo de Carvalho e Sampayo – amateur scientist who authored two important works on chromatics.

Portuguese archaeology was inaugurated by André de Resende in the 16th century. Portuguese contributors include Estácio da Veiga, José Leite de Vasconcelos, Irisalva Moita, Luís Raposo, Samuel Schwarz, Miriam Halpern Pereira, Raquel Varelaand João de Barros.

Manuel Valadares pioneered the use of X-rays for art restoration. Paleoethnobotanist António Rodrigo Pinto da Silva contributed to the study of Portuguese history.

== Governance ==
Portuguese politics is defined within the framework of a parliamentary, representative multy-party democratic republic, where the Prime Minister is the head of government.

The President is the head of the country and has significant political power. He is elected for a 5-year term by direct vote, and he is the commander-in-chief of the armed forces. His powers include the election of the Prime Minister and the Council of Ministers, in accordance with general elections results. The Council of State is a presidential oversight body, composed of six senior civilian officers, any former president elected since 1976, five members elected by the Assembly, and five directly appointed by the President.

Executive power is assigned to the Council of Ministers. Both the Government and the Portuguese Parliament (Assembleia da República) are equipped with legislative rights. The Assembly is elected by universal suffrage via proportional representation. Deputies serve a four-year term. Given extreme unrest or of inability to form a government, the President can dissolve the Assembly and call for new elections.

Since 1976, the Socialist Party (PS) and Social Democratic Party (PSD) have dominated the political landscape.

The judiciary is independent of the executive and legislative branches and the national Supreme Court is the court of last appeal. Military, administrative and fiscal courts are independent systemsce. A nine-member Constitutional Court verifies the constitutionality of legislation.

== Education ==
Education has been gradually modernized and expanded since the 1970s. According to the Program for International Student Assessment (PISA) in 2015, 15-year-old students were significantly above the OECD average for reading skills, mathematics and science. Portugal has recognized universities and business schools that have contributed international leaders and which attract an increasing number of foreign students. Portugal is among the top senders and receivers country within the Erasmus+ programme, with more student entering than leaving.

== Economy ==
Portugal's economy ranked 34th on the World Economic Forum's Global Competitiveness Report in 2019.

The majority of its trade is with the EU, the source and destination of more than 70% of the 2020 total. International trade amounted to approximately 153.3 billion Euros in 2022. Spain is by far its largest trading partner, accounting for 11.61% of exports and 32.07% of imports. Other important trading partners include NAFTA (6.3% of exports and 2% of imports), PALOP (5.7% of exports and 2.5% of imports), Maghreb (3.7% of exports and 1.3% of import and Mercosul (1.4% of exports and 2.5% of imports).

The Portuguese currency is the euro (€). The country has been part of the Eurozone since its founding.

The country's national bank is Banco de Portugal, and it is part of the European System of Central Banks. Most stock trading takes place on Euronext Lisbon, owned by NYSE Euronext. Important Portuguese banks include Banco Espírito Santo (now Novo Banco), Caixa Geral de Depósitos and Millennium BCP.

Portugal's largest companies include The Navigator Company (paper); Sonae Indústria (world's largest producer of wood panels); Corticeira Amorim (world's largest cork producer); Conservas Ramirez (canned food); Cimpor (top 10 cement); EDP Renováveis (#3 producer of wind energy); Jerónimo Martins (supermarket chain); José de Mello Group (conglomerate), TAP Air Portugal; and Brisa - Autoestradas de Portugal. Other companies include Sumol + Compal (drinks); Renova (tissue); Vista Alegre (ceramics); Nelo (MAR Kayaks Ltda) (boats); GestiFute (public relations); Pestana Group (tourism and leisure) and Salvador Caetano. Media companies include Impresa, Sociedade Independente de Comunicação (SIC), the first Portuguese private television network, NOS and MEO.

Portuguese businesswomen include Catarina Fagundes, CEO of Wind Birds, Catarina Portas, owner of A Vida Portuguesa, Fernanda Pires da Silva, President of Grupo Grão-Pará, a conglomerate focusing on construction, real estate, tourism, hotel management, and marble, Julia Carvalho, Corporate Manager at IBM, Maria da Conceição Zagalo, awarded by Amnesty International, as one of 25 women worldwide, "for her special dedication to social causes", Carla Castro and Eugénia Cândida da Fonseca da Silva Mendes.

Portuguese businessmen include Raul Pires Ferreira Chaves, inventor of a precursor to modular construction systems; Paulo Maló, founder of Malo Clinic; Zeinal Abedin Mohamed Bava; António Miguel Ferreira; Paulo Morgado, Executive Vice-president of Capgemini Group; Henrique de Sommer; Fernando Van Zeller Guedes, co-founder of Sogrape and the inspiration behind Mateus; Narciso Ferreira; Henrique de Mendonça, helping the Portuguese colony of São Tomé and Príncipe become a leading cocoa producers; Diogo Mónica, co-founder of Anchorage Digital. Expat Portuguese businessmen include Pedro José Lobo; Joe Berardo, entrepreneur; Arnaldo de Oliveira Sales; José Filipe Torres, branding expert; António Augusto Carvalho Monteiro, Quinta da Regaleira.

Fishing is a prominent occupation, notably for sardines. Both men and women work as fishermen.

== Cuisine ==
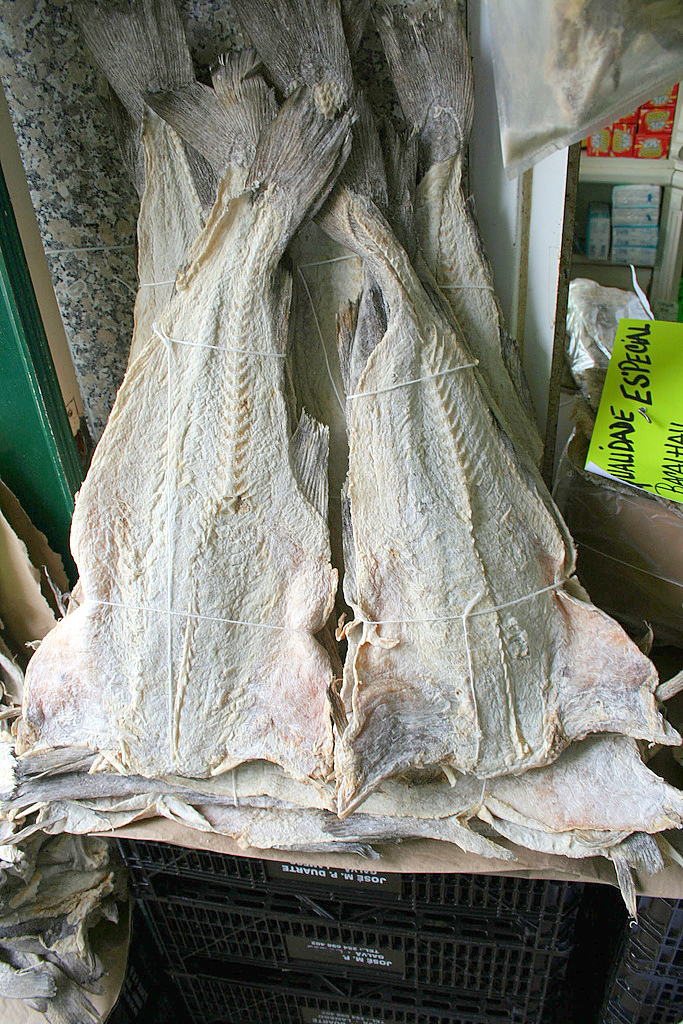
Bacalhau codfish is one of the epitomes of Portuguese cuisine

The oldest cookbook on Portuguese cooking is from the 16th century, Livro de Cozinha da Infanta D. Maria de Portugal (Crown-Princess Maria's cookbook). It describes recipes made of beef, fish, fowl, and other traditional ingredients. Even in the High Middle Ages, agriculture had already a regional character. Small peasant allotments and large latifundia were cultivated. The latter are particularly characteristic of southern regions, which were annexed as a result of the Reconquista and distributed among feudal lords, whereas further north, agricultural lots were typically smaller.

In modern times, fruit and grapes began to play an important role. Portugal is a world leader in fortified red and dry white wines. Port wine and Madeira wine come from there. Portuguese farmers grow pears, apples, plums, cherries, olives, citrus fruits and grain crops such as wheat, rye, corn, oats, and vegetables such as legumes.

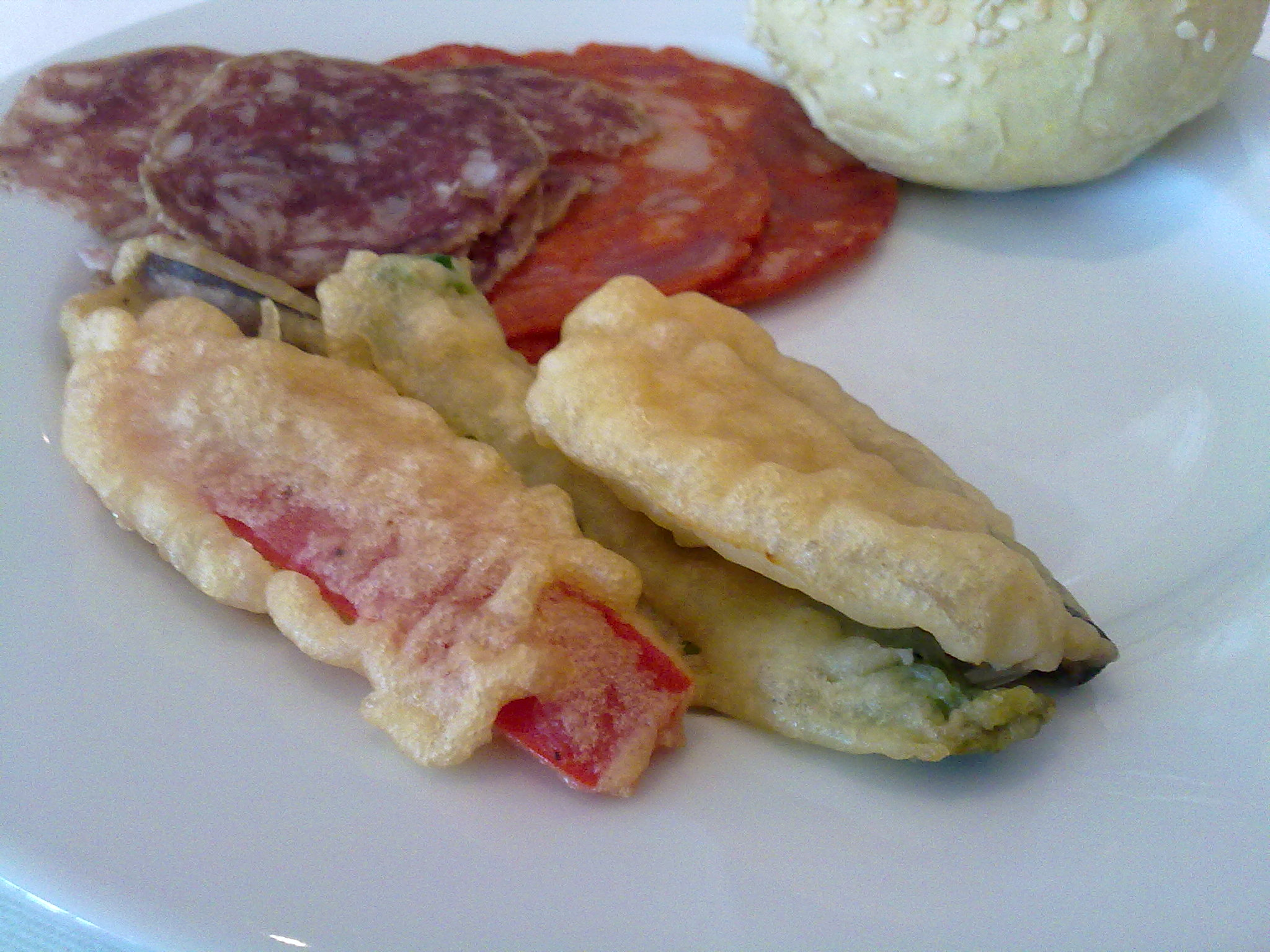
Peixinhos da horta, a typical dish from Lisbon from which Japanese tempura derives

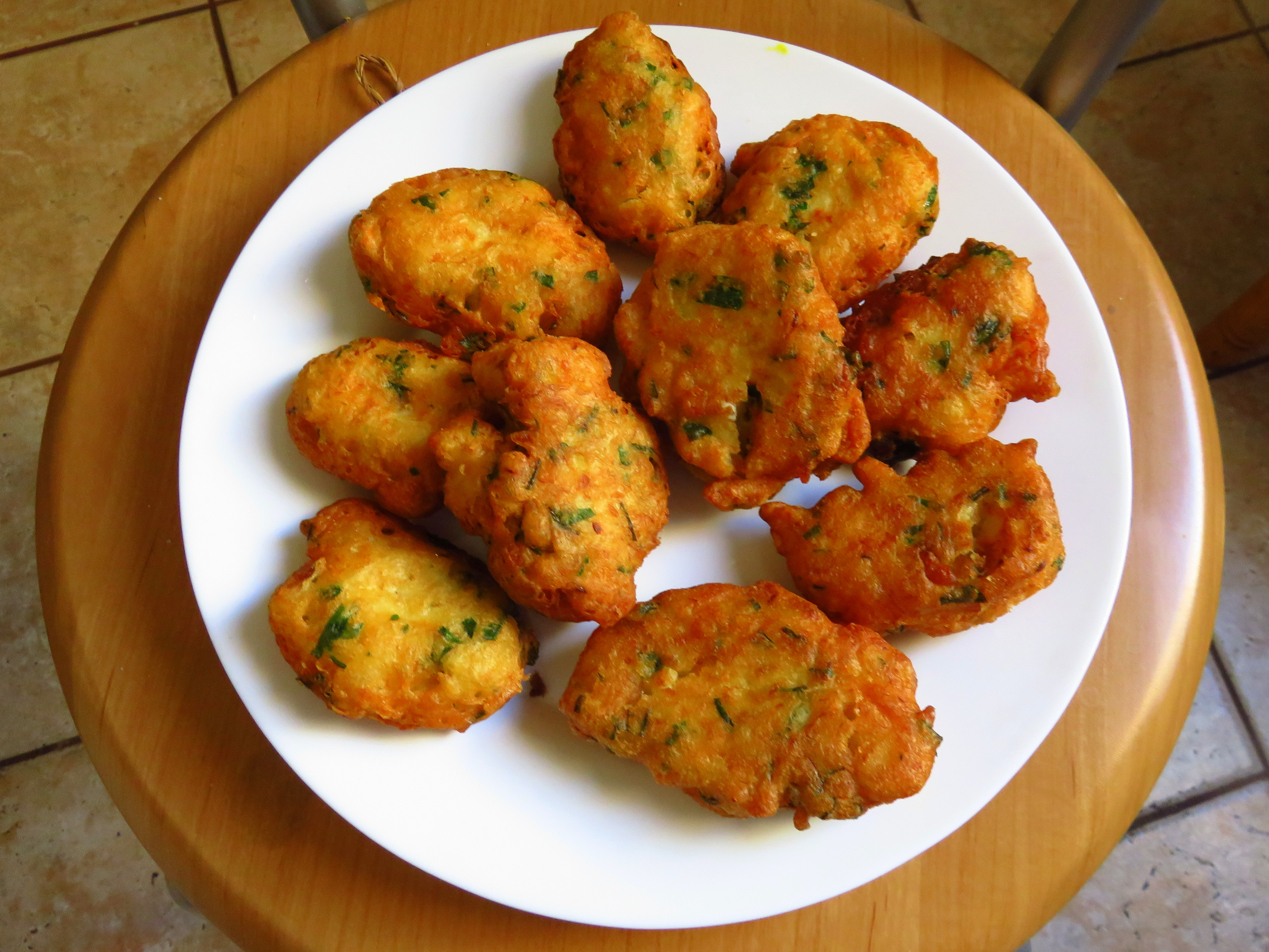
Pastéis de bacalhau, a typical petisco found everywhere in Portugal

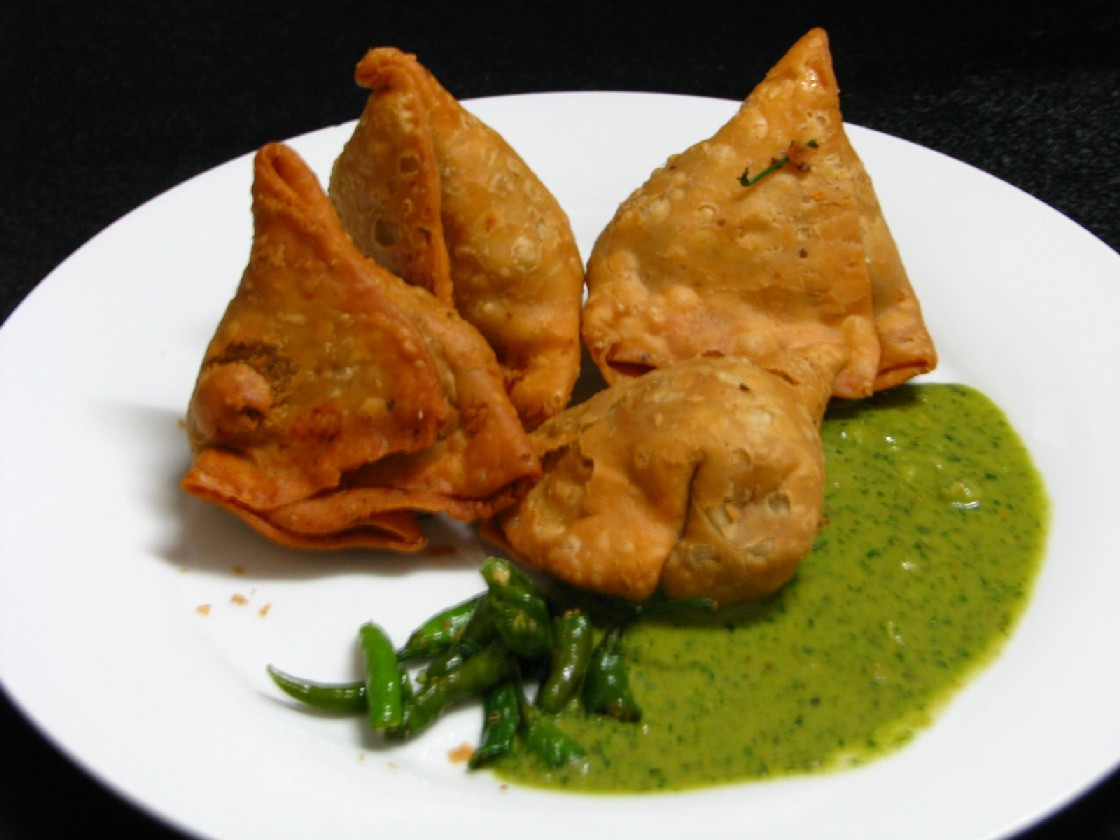
Chamuças (samosas) are an example of dish of foreign origin today widely popular in Portugal. They were first brought to the country during the Age of Discovery in the 15th century.

Portuguese cuisine relies on meats (pork, cattle, chicken and game among others).

High seafood (fish, crustaceans including lobster, crab, shrimp, prawns, and octopus) consumption is supported by rich fisheries along Portugal's 1,800 km of coastline (1,115 miles). This is balanced by vegetables, legumes, and sweets (notably, cakes). The diet is rich in carbohydrates that often includes fresh breads like broa, rice, and potatoes. The Portuguese lead the Europeans in rice consumption per capita, 16.1 kg per year. Rice specialities include, Arroz de Tamboril (Monkfish rice), Arroz de Pato (duck rice) and Arroz de Cabidela (rooster rice) enjoy high popularity. Portuguese are among the largest European potato consumers, consuming 62 kg potatoes per capita per year. Portugal has one of the largest livestock EU populations.

António-Maria De Oliveira Bello, also known as Olleboma, wrote "Culinária Portuguesa" (Portuguese Cuisine) in 1936. Portuguese cuisine draws from both Atlantic diet traditions and Mediterranean sources – Portugal is among the countries recognised by UNESCO for its Mediterranean diet – and from all over the world, especially from the onetime Portuguese Empire.

Portugal's role in the spice trade influenced its cuisine, particularly in the broad variety of spices used. These spices include piri piri (tiny, spicy chili peppers), white and black pepper, saffron, paprika, clove, allspice, cumin, and nutmeg.

Many dishes contain cinnamon, vanilla, lemon, orange, anise, clove, and allspice. Portuguese merchants introduced oranges in Middle Eastern countries. Today the Turkish ("Portakal"), Farsi (نارنجی or "portaqal") and Arabic (البرتقالي or "lburtuqaliiu") words for orange all reflect a Portuguese origin. This term extended to the Ottoman Empire and beyond, today appearing in languages such as Romanian (portocale), Albanian (portokalli), Greek (πορτοκάλι-portokáli) and Georgian (ფორთოხალი-portokhali).

One popular dish is Feijoada. Feijão is Portuguese for bean. With feijoada salada de tomate and vinagrete or molho vinagrete are sometimes served. The Portuguese have 365 ways of cooking cod (bacalhau). Other emblematic Portuguese traditional dishes are Cozido à portuguesa (Portuguese stew) and Caldo verde (green soup). The most globally appreciated pastry is pastel de nata, sometimes known as Natas or Portuguese custard tarts.

Portugal has 19 named wine regions Denominação de Origem Controlada: Alenquer, Arruda, Bairrada, Beira Interior, Bucelas, Carcavelos, Colares, Dão, Douro, Encostas d'Aire, Lagoa, Lagos, Óbidos, Palmela, Portimão, Setúbal, Tavira, Távora-Varosa, and Torres Vedras. The most famous Portuguese wine isVinho do Porto (port), which is grown only in the região demarcada do Douro. Several unique types of Port wine are made, namely Porto Branco, Porto Ruby, and Porto Tawny. Also famous is the slightly sparkling Vinho Verde (green wine), from the Minho region.

Notable Portuguese chefs include Filipa Vacondeus, Louise Bourrat and Marlene Vieira.

== Architecture ==
Azulejos are a distinctive feature of Portuguese architecture as it is the case with Capela das Almas, in Porto

Portuguese architecture encompasses work in Portugal and its former colonies, reflecting these diverse cultures. Romans and Moors each left marks. Epitomes of the Portuguese architectural style are Romanesque, Gothic and, above all, Manueline style. Baroque and Rococo were influential. After the 1755 Lisbon earthquake the Pombaline style (now candidate to become a listed UNESCO heritage site) took over and is still visible, especially in Estremadura (the region of the capital city, Lisbon). Other influences include Romanesque evolving into contemporary styles. The Fundação Calouste Gulbenkian, built in the 1960s is one of defining examples of 20th-century Portuguese architecture.

Santuário do Bom Jesus do Monte, in Braga, with its famous Baroque stairway

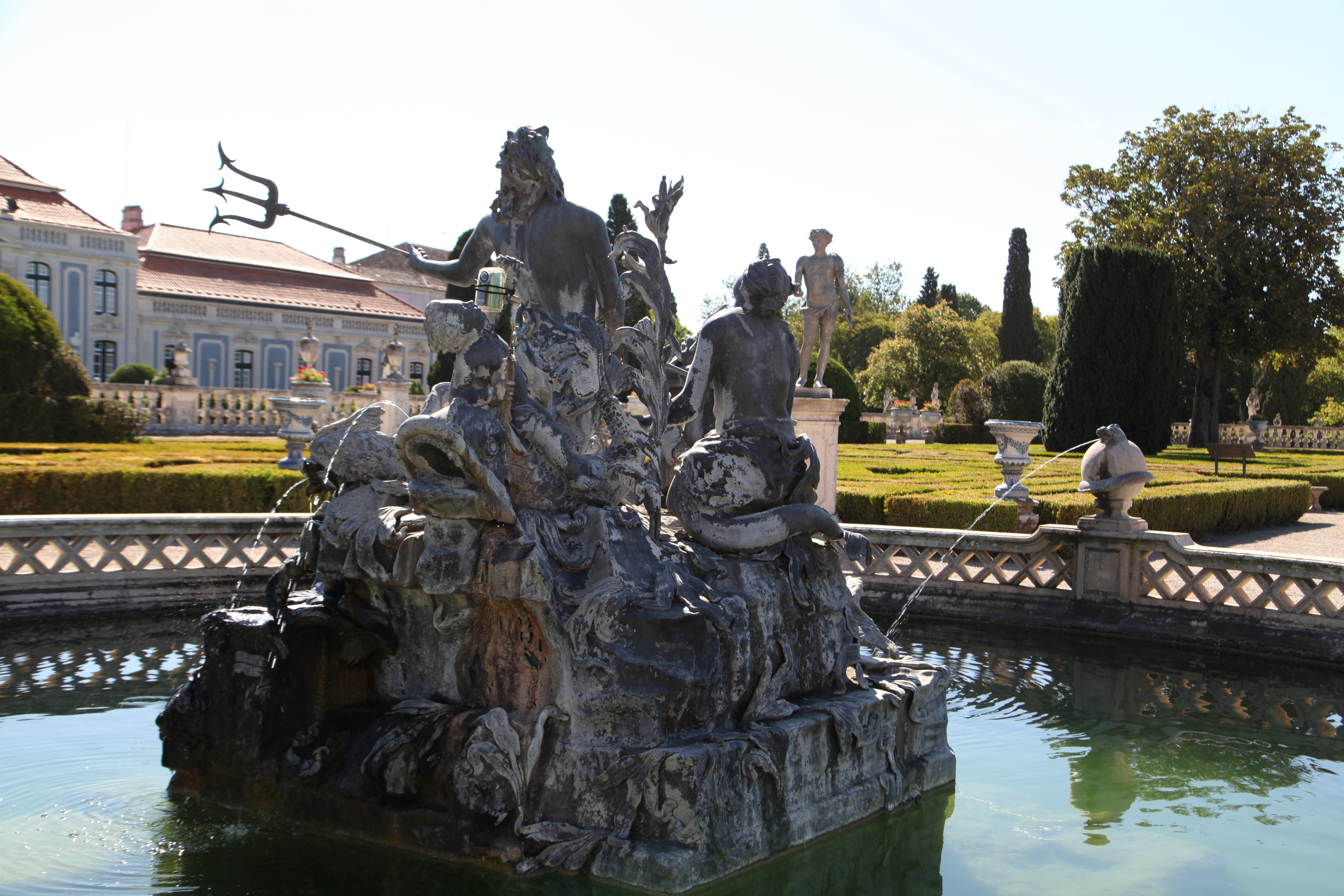
Fountain in the Palácio Nacional de Queluz, Queluz

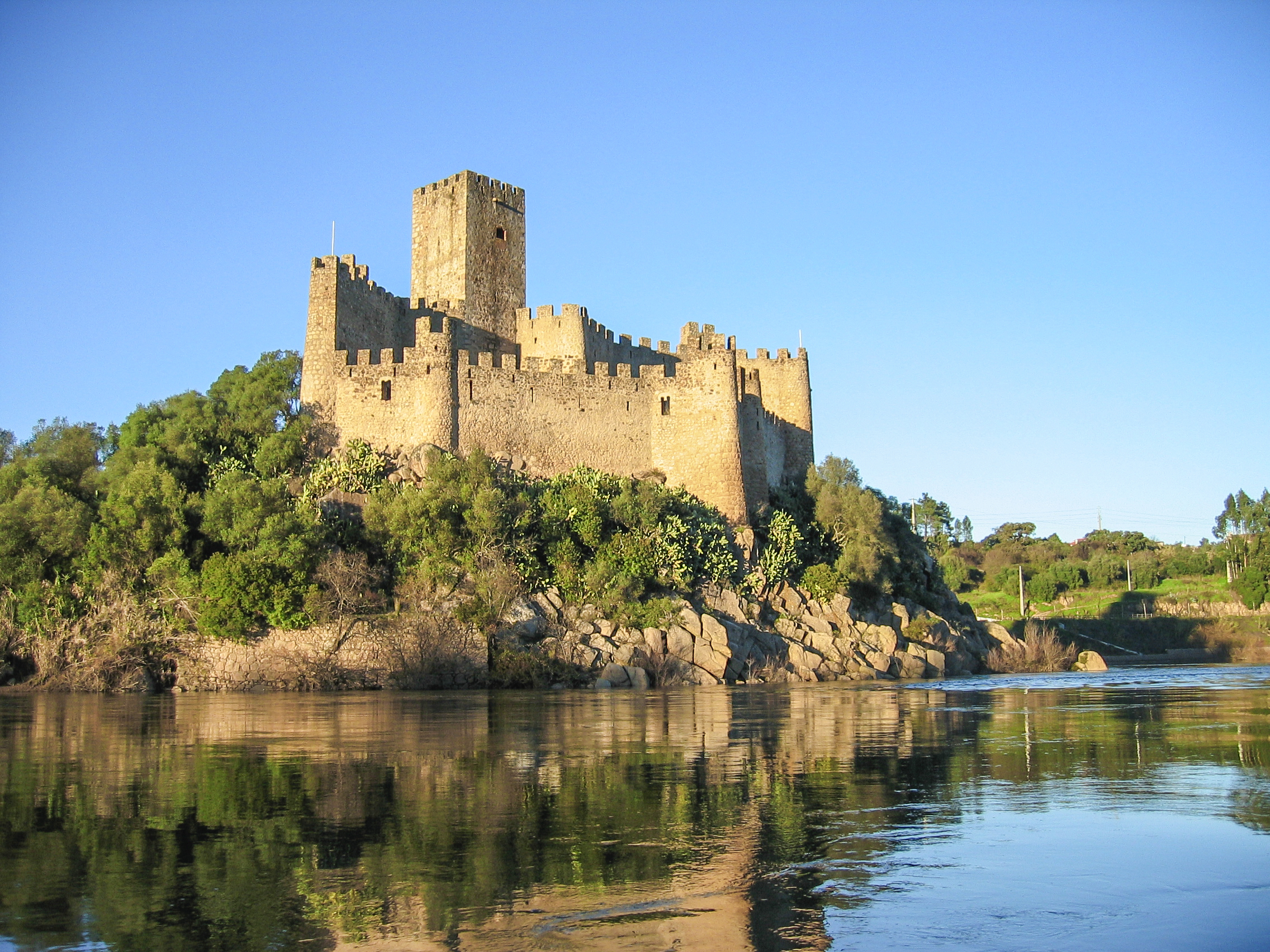
Portugal is famous for its Medieval and Templar castles. A fine example is the Castle of Almourol, in Vila Nova da Barquinha.

19th century architects include Maria José Marques da Silva, Helena Roseta, Miguel Ventura Terra and José Marques da Silva. Modern architects include Pritzker Architecture Prize winners Eduardo Souto de Moura and Siza Vieira. Others include Raul Lino, Fernando Távora and Álvaro Siza Vieira. Tomás Taveira is noted particularly for stadium design. Other Portuguese architects include Diogo de Arruda (chapter house window at the Convent of Christ, in Tomar), Pedro Nunes Tinoco and Filippo Terzi (Monastery of São Vicente de Fora), André Soares (Falperra Church), José António Caldas (dark room pioneer in Brazil), Carlos Amarante (Bom Jesus do Monte), João Luís Carrilho da Graça, José da Costa e Silva (established Neoclassical architecture in Portugal and Brazil), José Luis Monteiro, João Abel Manta, Huguet and Mateus Fernandes (Monastery of Batalha)

Portuguese architects who made contributions abroad include Alfredo Azancot in Chile, Emanuele Rodriguez Dos Santos in Italy, and Jo Palma in Canada.

== Music ==
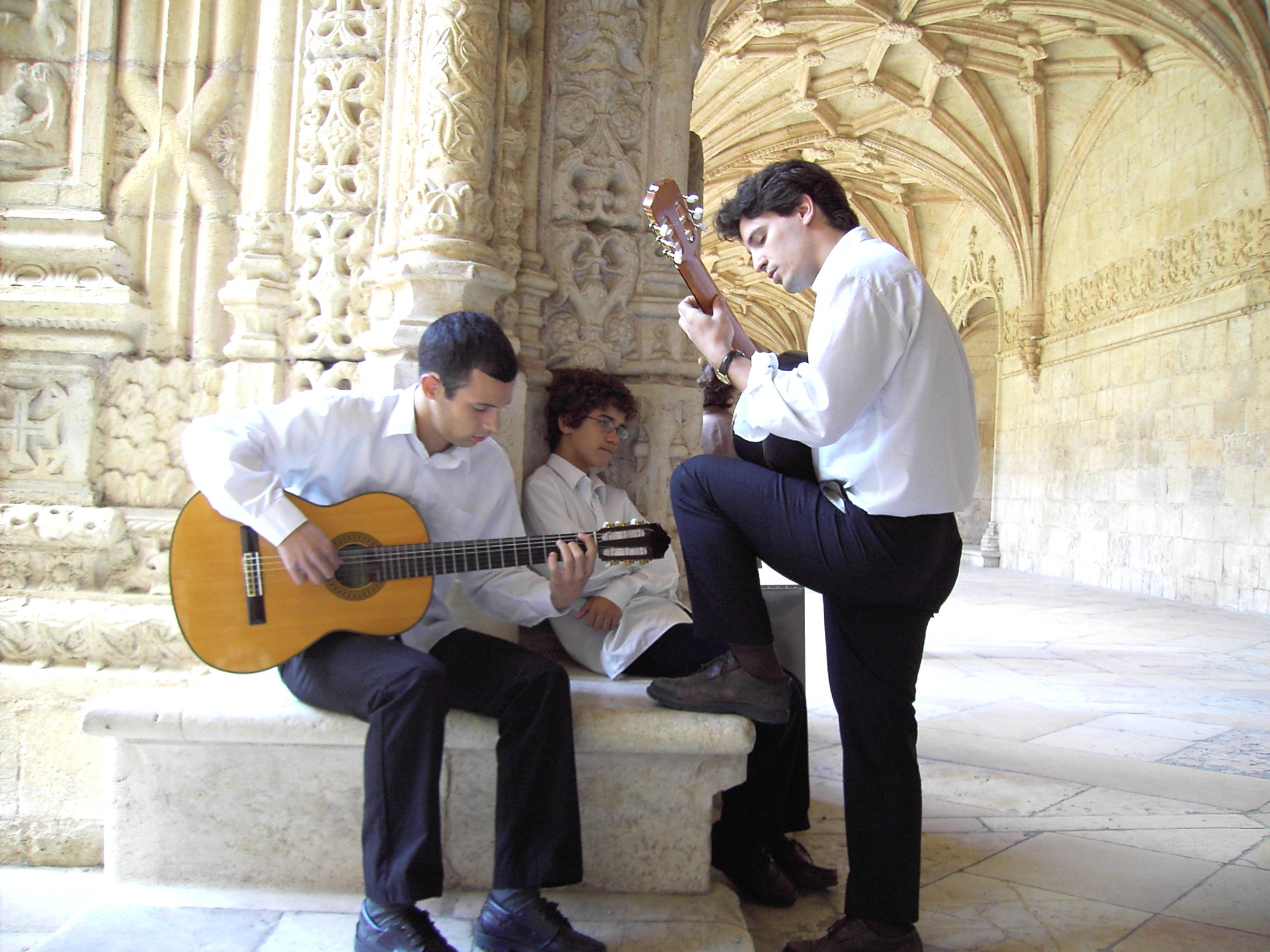
Portuguese fadistas performing in the Mosteiro dos Jerónimos, Lisbon

From folk music to classical, music has always played an important role in Portuguese culture. From traditional songs from the north of the country to the rhythms of Portuguese-influenced samba, from fado to Portuguese pop-rock, Portuguese music has listeners all over the world.

Portuguese music dates back to the Middle Ages, when troubadours, poets and musicians sang love songs throughout the country.

The 16th century brought musical influences such as the stringed instrument, the Krencong, which traveled from Portugal to Indonesia and made a lasting contribution to Indonesian culture. Another instrument of Portuguese origin that gained acclaim in Hawaiian music is the ukulele, which originated on Madeira Island.

Fado is the leading modern genre. Originating in Lisbon in the 19th century, it symbolizes Portuguese culture. Fado songs often express love, saudade (longing) and difficulties in life. The great ambassador of Portuguese fado, Amália Rodrigues, had carried the music across the world during the 1950s and 1960s. Musicians such as Mariza, Ana Moura and Cristina Branco, Katia Guerreiro modernized and invigorated this musical art alive. The genre is one of two Portuguese music traditions in the UNESCO Intangible Cultural Heritage Lists, along with Cante Alentejano.

Besides fado, the country produced other popular music, including Portuguese Pop Rock, developed in the 1980s and 1990s by artists such as Xutos & Pontapés, Rui Veloso, and the Madredeus. The latter are noted for their innovative use of the traditional Portuguese guitar.

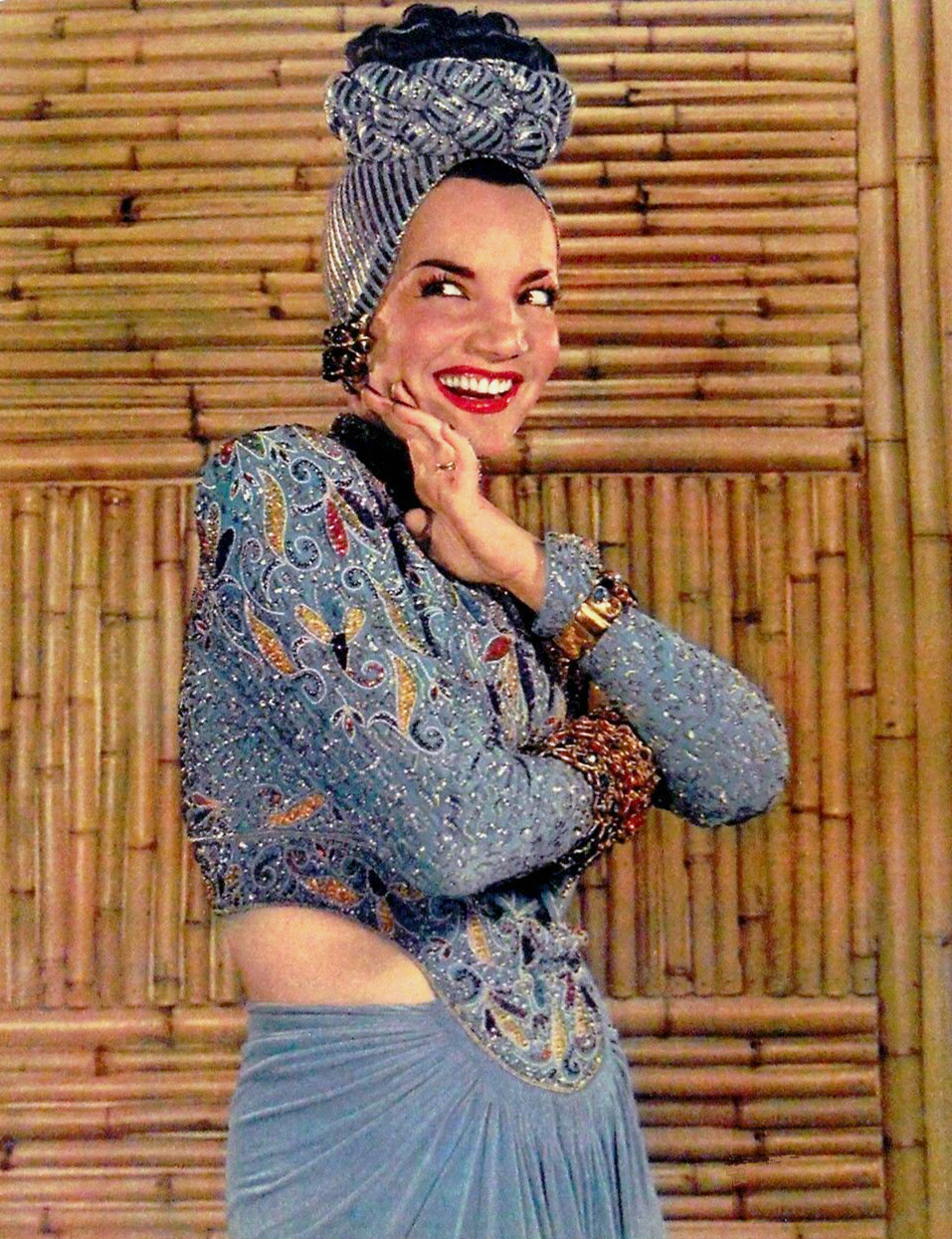
Carmen Miranda GCIH, OMC who reached stardom in Brazil as the foremost interpreter of samba

Other popular imported genres include dance, house, kizomba, pop, reggae, ska and zouk. World music stars include Waldemar Bastos. A notable Portuguese kizomba author is Soraia Ramos.

Ângelo César do Rosário Firmino and Diana De Brito are important rap artists. Hip hop arrived in the early 1990s. The first artist to sign a major record deal was General D. Other important artists from the Hip hop tuga genre include Sam the Kid and Regula.

In jazz, notable Portuguese performers include Carmen Souza, Marta Dias, Vânia Fernandes, Maria João and Luísa Sobral. while in the kuduro musical genre in Portugal Keidje Torres Lima is notable. Other authors are Lura, Georgina Ribas, Filipa Azevedo, Nenny, Ana Free, Ana Bela Alves and Bárbara Bandeira.

== Cinema ==
Portuguese cinema appeared at the end of the 19th century, via silent films. In the 1920s that cinema became an important cultural and artistic element. The first Portuguese film, shot in Porto, was directed by Aurélio da Paz dos Reis in 1896. In homage to the Departure of the Workers from the Lumière Factory (La Sortie de l'usine Lumière à Lyon) by Auguste and Louis Lumière shot in 1895, he filmed the Departure of the Workers from the Confiança Factory (Saída do Pessoal Operário da Fábrica Confiança).

José Leitão de Barros pioneered the Portuguese film industry, producing and directing silent films starting in the 1910s. One of the first notable female actresses was Cremilda de Oliveira. Manoel de Oliveira extended de la Velle's legacy. His film "Aniki-Bóbó (1942), is notable for its innovation and vision of adolescence. Manoel de Oliveira made more than 30 films, including I'm Going home (2001), produced at age 93.

In the 1950s, attention pivoted to technically advanced Hollywood films. In the 1960s, attention returned home. In the 1960s innovative cinema flourished, notably with director Fernando Lopes. He made films that touched on themes of politics and religion, generating debate and controversy at the time. His film Belarmino (1964), won the Golden Lion at that year's Venice exhibition.

Fernando Lopes led a new generation of directors in the 70s and 80s. This period saw films like Mudar de Vida (1966) by Paulo Rocha. In the 70s the School of Reis – a concept related to the teachings of Portuguese director António Reis and Margarida Cordeiro – emerged. Notable proponents are João Pedro Rodrigues and Pedro Costa.

Despite some national success, Portuguese films were largely ignored by international festivals until the emergence of directors such as directors Luis Filipe Rocha and Manuel Carvalheiro in the 1980s and Marco Martins in 2008.

In 1989, the first of a new wave of filmmakers, Pedro Costa, presented O Sangue. This film, along with its follow-up efforts in the 90s, Ossos and Casa de Lava, shaped a distinctive style.

Portuguese directors have influenced the international film industry. Luis Filipe Rocha's film Cerromaior was screened in the Un Certain Regard section at the Cannes Film Festival in 1981 and awarded the Colón de Oro at the Huelva Ibero-American Film Festival, while Manuel Carvalheiro won the prestigious CICAE Award in 1982 at the Hyères international festival du Jeune Cinéma with his short film ABC, officially selected at the Huelva Ibero-American Film Festival. He was then selected at the Berlin International Film Festival in 1982 with his short film Salazar's Loves. Since then, other Portuguese filmmakers have competed at major international festivals, including Manoel de Oliveira for the Palme d'Or at Cannes, in 1985.

The telenovela is a popular genre, brought from Brazil, and the country is a major producer and consumer. Many Portuguese telenovelas have reached international audiences, such as A Única Mulher, Floribella, Morangos com Açúcar, Laços de Sangue and Conta-me como foi. Telenovela stars include Liliana Santos, Lúcia Moniz, Diogo Morgado, Vera Kolodzig, Sílvia Alberto, Diogo Amaral, Rita Pereira, Joana Ribeiro, Ricardo Pereira, Mariana Monteiro, and Luciana Abreu.

Portuguese authors have participated in international productions; among them Maria de Medeiros, Joaquim de Almeida, Daniela Ruah, Diogo Morgado, Alba Batista, Daniela Melchior, Nuno Lopes, Cris Huerta, Helena D'Algy and Rafael Morais.

Nuno Sá Pessoa and Diana Andringa are known for documentaries, Nuno Markl, Rita Camarneiro, Ricardo Araújo Pereira, Filomena Cautela and Eduardo Serra are TV hosts (Harry Potter and the Deathly Hallows – Part 1 and Harry Potter and the Deathly Hallows – Part 2).

== Influencers ==
Top 10 Influencers*
Rank	Username	Owner	Followers	Profession/Activity	Notes
1	@cristiano	Cristiano Ronaldo	622,000,000	Footballer	Most followed person on Instagram
2	@virginia	Virginia Fonseca	46,000,000	Influencer, YouTuber, businesswoman	American-born Brazilian who also holds Portuguese nationality. This makes her the most followed Portuguese woman on Instagram.
3	@gioewbank	Giovanna Ewbank	29,300,000	Actress, model, Television presenter	Brazilian-born Luso-Brazilian citizen
4	@phil.coutinho	Philippe Coutinho	24,400,000	Footballer	Most followed Brazilian-born Luso-Brazilian man on Instagram
5	@brunogagliasso	Bruno Gagliasso	22,300,000	Actor	Luso-Brazilian citizen
6	@official_pepe	Pepe	17,600,000	Footballer	Brazilian-born
7	@felipeneto	Felipe Neto	17,300,000	YouTuber	Luso-Brazilian citizen
8	@ileana_official	Ileana D'Cruz	16,400,000	Actress	Indian-born
9	@joaofelix79	João Félix	11,800,000	Footballer	
10	@brunofernandes8	Bruno Fernandes	8,800,000	Footballer	
11	@oficialkellykey	Kelly Key	8,700,000	Singer	Luso-Brazilian citizen
12	@sarasampaio	Sara Sampaio	8,600,000	Model	Most followed Portuguese-born Portuguese model on Instagram
13	@jpcancelo	João Cancelo	6,800,000	Footballer	
14	@pedroscooby	Pedro Scooby	5,800,000	Surfer	Luso-Brazilian
15	@luccasneto	Luccas Neto	5,800,000	Actor, comedian	Luso-Brazilian
16	@iamrafaeleao93	Rafael Leão	5,600,000	Footballer	Being of Portuguese-Angolan descent, he is the most followed Luso-African on Instagram
17	@ederson93	Ederson Moraes	5,200,000	Footballer	Luso-Brazilian
18	@luis__figo	Luís Figo	4,900,000	Footballer	
19	@renatosanches18	Renato Sanches	4,800,000	Footballer	Of São Tomé and Príncipe and Cape Verdean descent
20	@bernardocarvalhosilva	Bernardo Silva	4,700,000	Footballer	
21	@doloresaveiroofficial	Dolores Aveiro	4,300,000	Cristiano Ronaldo's mother	
22	@josemourinho	José Mourinho	4,100,000	Football manager	
23	@ricardoquaresmaoficial	Ricardo Quaresma	4,100,000	Footballer	Most followed Portuguese of Romani descent
24	@rubendias	Rúben Dias	3,600,000	Footballer	
25	@diogodalot	Diogo Dalot	3,100,000	Footballer	Most followed Portuguese of French descent on Instagram
26	@nelsonsemedo50	Nélson Semedo	3,000,000	Footballer	Of Cape Verdean descent
27	@jorgejesus	Jorge Jesus	3,000,000	Football manager	
28	@luisnani	Nani	2,500,000	Footballer	Of Cape Verdean descent
29	@ferodriguesoficial	Fernanda Rodrigues	2,300,000	Actress, Television presenter	Luso-Brazilian
30	@diogoj_18	Diogo Jota	2,300,000	Footballer	
31	@fabio_coentrao	Fábio Coentrão	2,000,000	Footballer	
32	@aftgomes21	André Gomes	1,800,000	Footballer	
33	@magui_corceiro	Margarida Corceiro	1,800,000	Actress	Most followed Portuguese born in the 21st century
34	@andresilva9	André Silva	1,500,000	Footballer	
35	@dailycristina	Cristina Ferreira	1,600,000	Television presenter	
36	@hyndia	Rita Pereira	1,500,000	Actress	
37	@pedrocarvalho_oficial	Pedro Carvalho	1,500,000	Actor	Most followed Portuguese male actor
38	@katiaaveirooficial	Kátia Aveiro	1,400,000	Pop singer	
39	@explorerssaurus_	Raquel e Miguel	1,300,000	Travellers	Most followed Portuguese couple on Instagram
40	@danielamelchior	Daniela Melchior	1,300,000	Actress	
41	@ricardinho10oficial	Ricardinho	1,300,000	Futsal player	Most followed Portuguese futsal player
42	@h.herrera16	Héctor Herrera	1,200,000	Footballer	Most followed Portuguese citizen of Mexican descent on Instagram
43	@sergioliveira27	Sérgio Oliveira	1,200,000	Footballer	
44	@iamdanilopereira	Danilo Pereira	1,200,000	Footballer	Most followed Guinea-Bissau born Portuguese on Instagram
45	@claudiavieiraoficial	Cláudia Vieira	1,200,000	Actress, Television presenter	
46	@pedrobarrosopb	Pedro Barroso	1,100,000	Actor	
47	@nunomendes	Nuno Mendes	1,100,000	Footballer	Of Angolan descent
48	@rubendsneves	Rúben Neves	1,100,000	Footballer	
49	@gonolivier	Gonçalo Olivier	1,100,000	Influencer	One of the most followed Portuguese influencers
50	@danielaruah	Daniela Ruah	1,100,000	Actress	Most followed American-Bissau born Portuguese on Instagram
Instagram As of February 26, 2024

== See also ==
- Ethnic groups in Europe
- Galicians
- Luso-Asians
- Luso-Africans
- Iberian Jews
- Luso-Greeks
- Portuguese American
- Portuguese Canadians
- List of Portuguese people
- Portuguese cuisine
- Portuguese culture
- Lusitanics
- Lusophone
- Portuguese language
- Category:Portuguese people

Diaspora Politics

- Europe (Assembly of the Republic constituency)
- Outside Europe (Assembly of the Republic constituency)
