= Portuguese inventions =

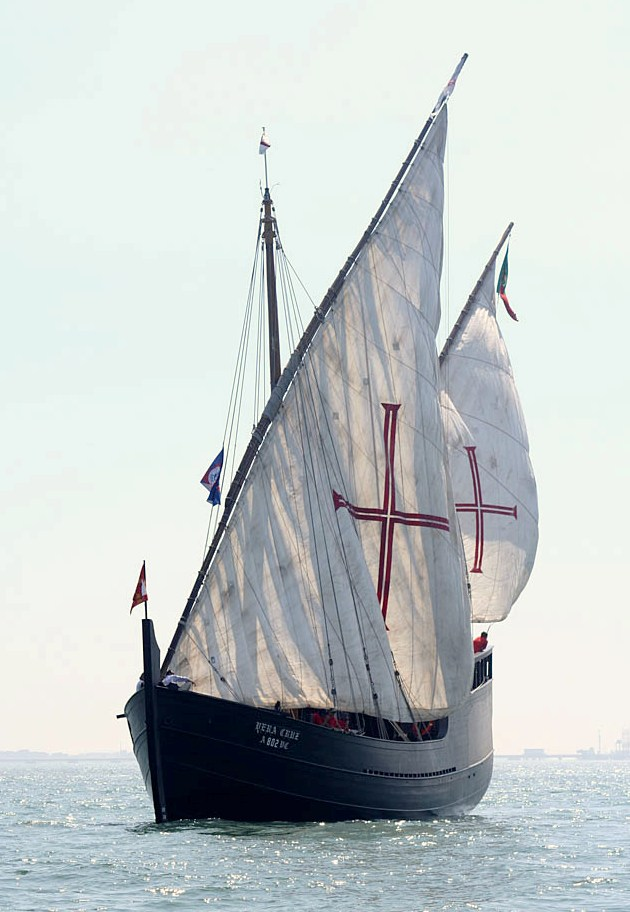
The Portuguese Caravel, one of the naval creations made by the Portuguese

The Portuguese inventions are the inventions created by the people born in Portugal (continent or overseas), or whose nationality is Portuguese. These inventions were created mainly during the age of Portuguese discoveries, and during modernity.

Relying on trade secret explains, in part, the difficulty often experienced by researchers in documenting Portuguese inventions, as many are not described in patent documents, or other technical documents. On the other hand, there are cases, like some types of swords, where the inventions themselves or the underlying documents were lost, having been destroyed, for example, during the French invasions. There are as well documentation and objects of Portuguese origin in private collections or museums outside of Portugal.

== Discoveries ==
The creation of new inventions in Portugal was at its peak during the Age of Discovery. These inventions consisted mainly in the improvement of devices and techniques of ocean navigation and coastal cartography, such as the mariner's astrolabe and the chart of latitudes. On the field of military applications, the construction of cannons and new types of swords, like the Carracks black sword.

=== Modernity ===
More recently, the technical domain varies from computers to medicine. Such examples might be Via Verde, an automatic system for collecting tolls for vehicles; the Multibanco, an automatic teller machine network with a multitude of functions ranging from bank transfers to the payment of tickets for shows; or in the field of medicine, a treatment of epilepsy, the drug Zebinix by Bial Laboratories.

== Gallery of Portuguese inventions ==
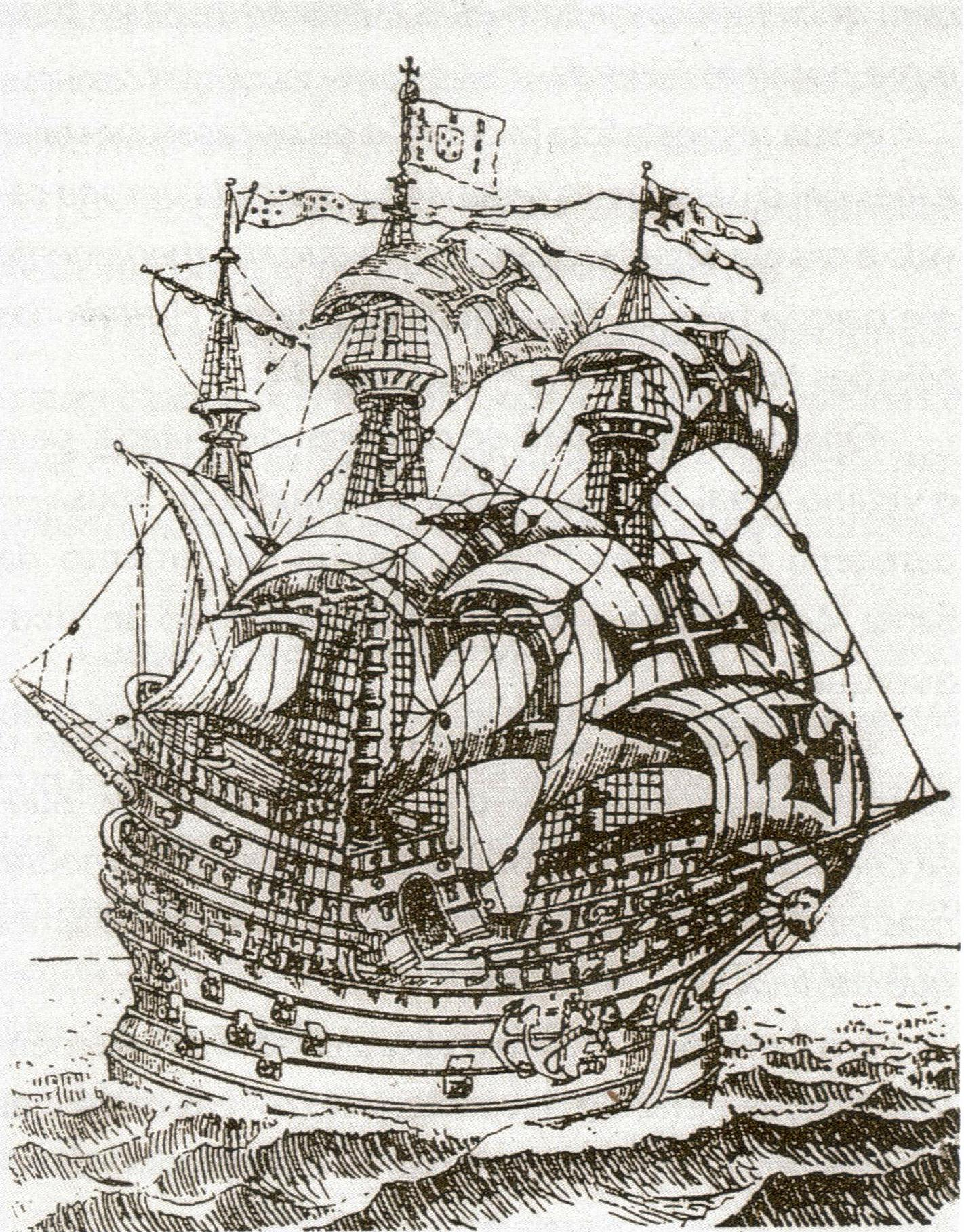
Carrack (Nau) – the Oceanic Carrack (a new and different model, and largest carrack)

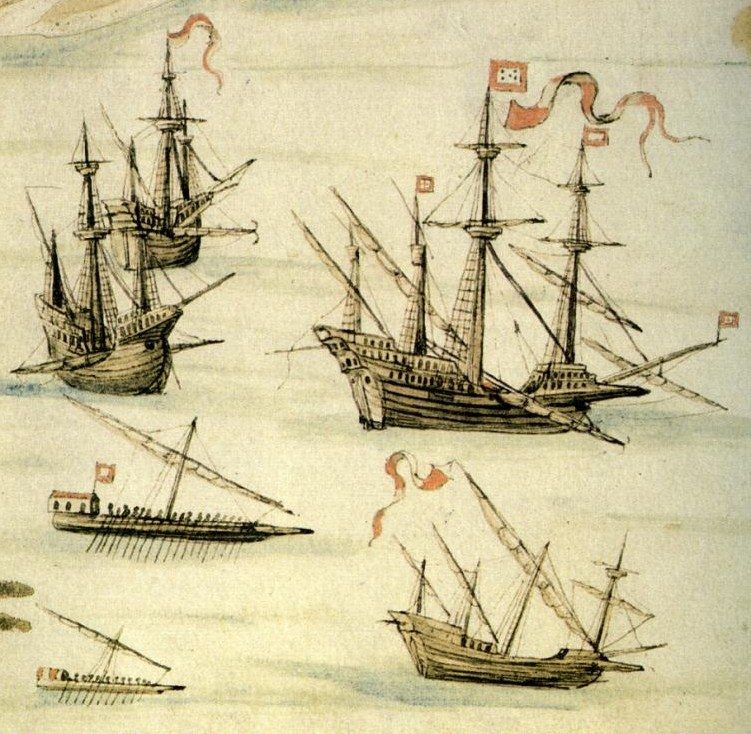
Galleon – the Oceanic Galleon

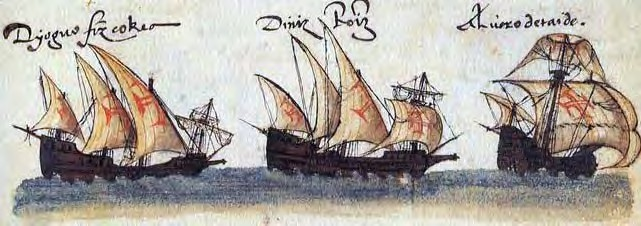
Square-rigged caravel – Round caravel. The most enduring and replicated model of the ships with this name, and predecessor of other ships of the range.

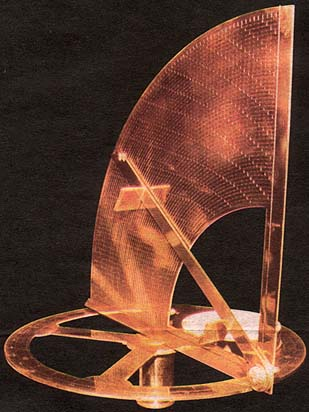
The nonius

The mariner's astrolabe

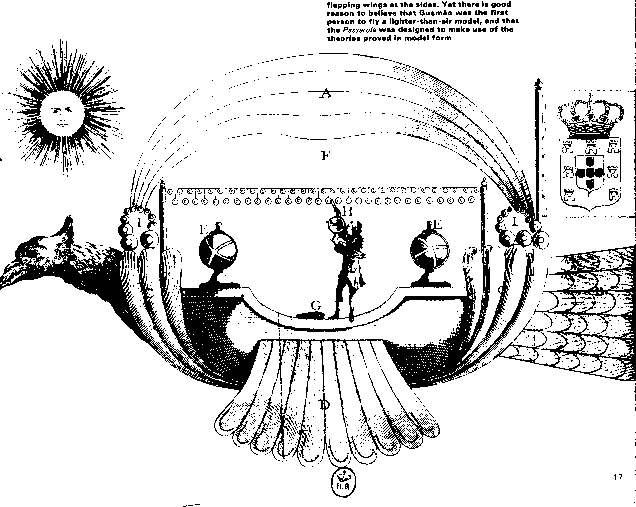
The Passarola, the first known airship

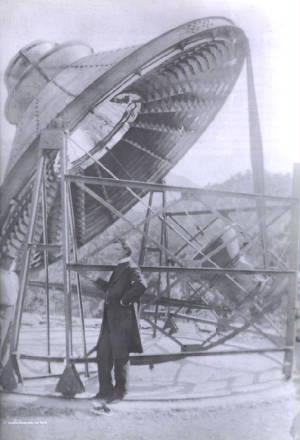
The Pyreliophorus

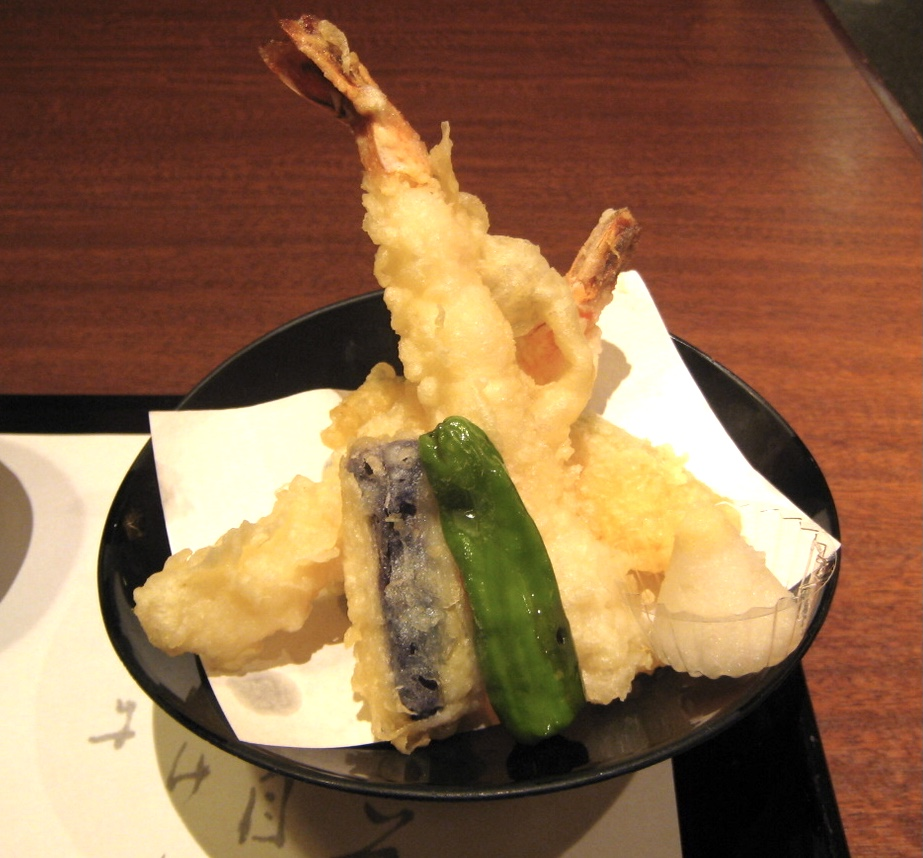
Tempura

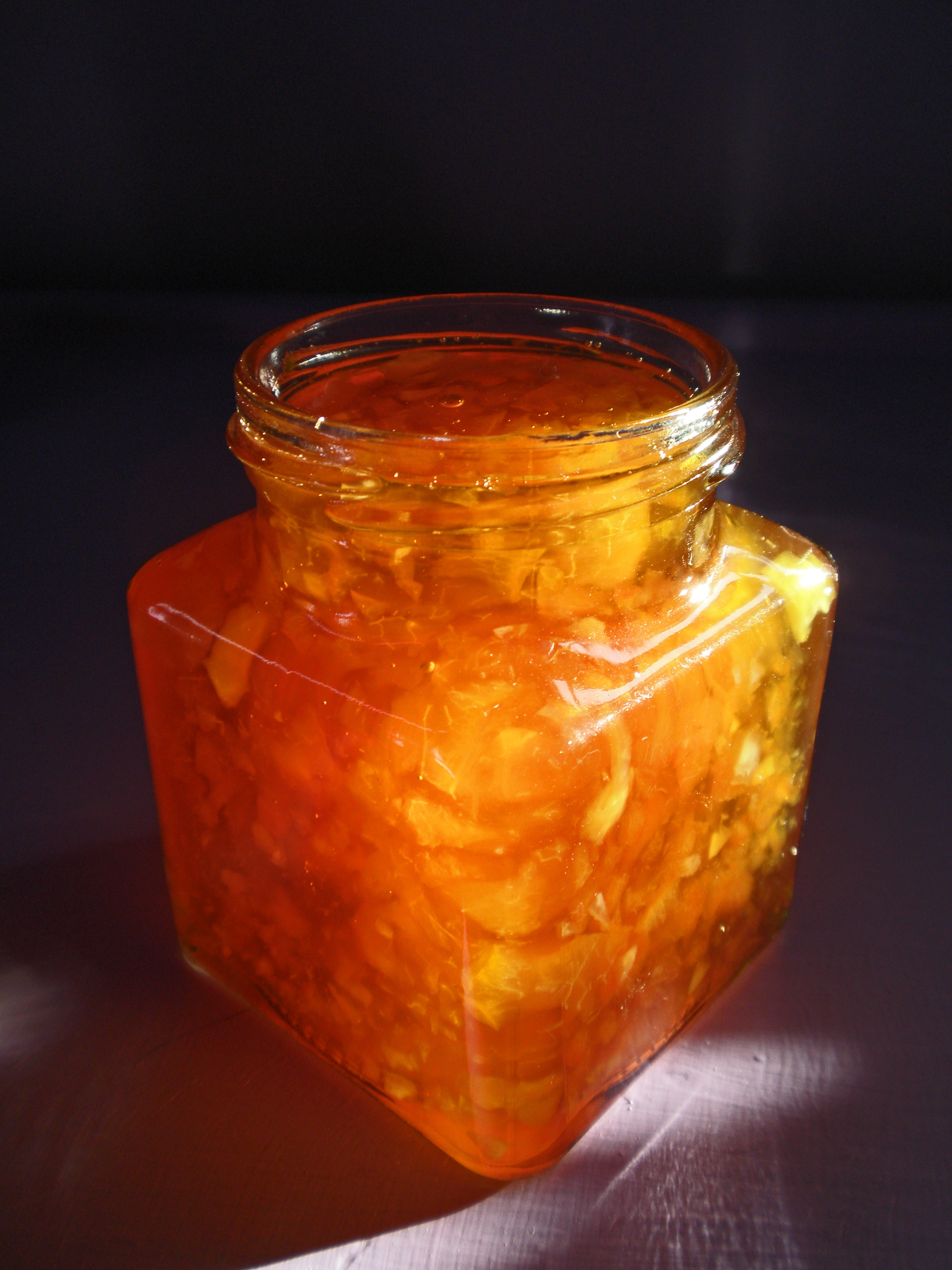
Marmalade

The drug Zebinix

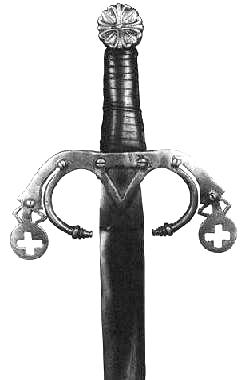
The Carracks black sword

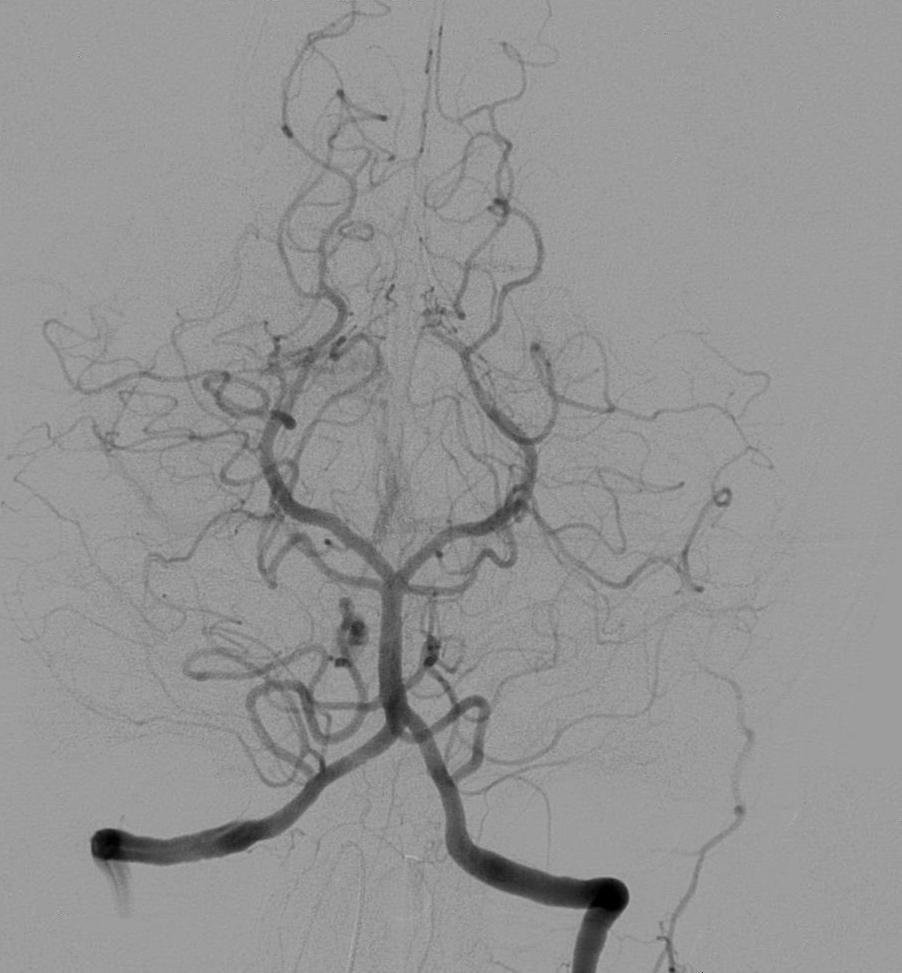
Cerebral angiography

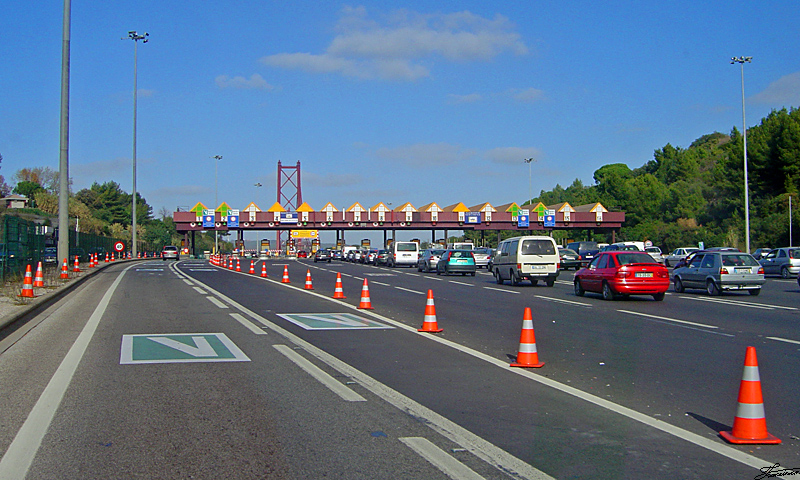
The Via Verde toll collection system

The All-on-4 dental method

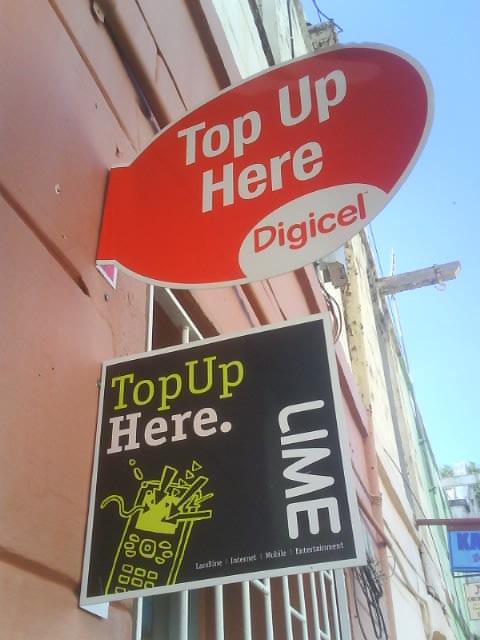
Prepaid mobile phone

Multibanco

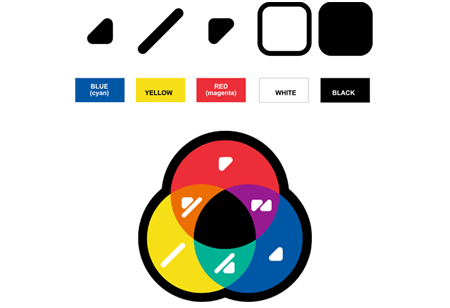
Coloradd

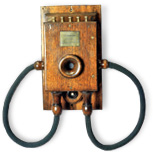
Herrmann wall telephone

== See also ==
- List of Portuguese inventions and discoveries
- Armillary sphere
- Ballastella
- Cartaz
- Chip log
- Volta do mar
