= List of Portuguese inventions and discoveries =

Portuguese inventions and discoveries are objects, processes or techniques invented or discovered by Portuguese people.

== Arts and entertainment ==
- Manueline, an art style of the early 16th century
- Neo-Manueline, a revival art style from the mid-19th century
- Soft Portuguese style, is an architectural model adopted mainly by public buildings
- Pombaline style, an architectural style of the 18th century
- Portuguese colonial architecture, a collection of styles of architecture that the Portuguese built across the Portuguese Empire
- Visigothic art and architecture, architecture and art styles of the Iberian Visigoths in the 5th century
- Azulejo, a form of painted tin-glazed ceramic tilework
- Portuguese pavement, a traditional-style pavement used in pedestrian areas
- Adufe, a square tambourine
- Ukulele, string instrumental developed by Portuguese immigrants in Hawaii
- Gaita transmontana, a type of Portuguese bagpipe
- Galician gaita, a type of Portuguese and Galician bagpipe.
- Portuguese guitar, a plucked string instrument with twelve steel strings
- Rabeca chuleira, a three-string fiddle
- Cavaquinho, a small string instrument that originated the Ukulele
- Machete, a small string instrument from Madeira
- Viola braguesa, a ten-string instrument
- Viola campaniça, a ten steel string guitar
- Viola amarantina, a ten string guitar with two heart-shaped frontal openings
- Viola toeira, a twelve string guitar

== Food and cooking ==
- Presunto ibérico, a type of cured ham
- Enchidos, a variety of cured, dry sausages
- Alheira, a type of sausage made with meats other than pork (usually veal, duck, chicken, quail or rabbit) and bread
- São Jorge cheese, a type of semi-hard to hard cheese
- Castelo Branco cheese, type of goat cheese
- Serra da Estrela cheese, a type of ewes cheese
- Port wine, a type of fortified wine
- Moscatel, a type of fortified wine
- Madeira wine, a type of fortified wine
- Jeropiga, a type of fortified white wine
- Vinho Verde, a type of white wine fermented using young grapes
- Pastel de nata, an egg tart pastry
- Tempura, a Japanese dish introduced to Japan by Portuguese Jesuit missionaries
- Marmalade, a type of fruit preserve
- Churros, a type of fried-dough pastry

== Nautical science ==
- Carrack, a three- or four-masted sailing ship
- Galleon, a large sailing warship
- Caravel, a small, highly maneuverable sailing ship
- Square-rigged caravel, a large sailing ship
- Man-of-war, a powerful warship armed with cannons and propelled by sails
- Line of battle, a tactic of naval warfare where a fleet of ships forms a line end to end
- Gun port, an opening on the side of a ship's hull that allows artillery pieces to fire outside
- Broadside, a development in naval warfare where cannons are mounted on and fired from the sides of a ship
- Nonius, a system for taking fine measurements on the astrolabe
- Mariner's astrolabe, an inclinometer used to determine the latitude of a ship
- Portuguese nautical cartography, a compendium of navigational and geographic maps
- Cantino planisphere, the earliest extant nautical chart where places are depicted according to their astronomically observed latitudes
- School of Sagres, first court of navigation founded in Sagres
- Chip log, a navigation tool mariners use to estimate the speed of a vessel through water
- Volta do mar, a navigation technique that exploits trade winds to move across the sea

== Weaponry ==
- Carracks black sword, a type of sword designed to be used by soldiers and sailors in ships and caravels
- Dilagrama m/65, a grenade adapter that fits the barrel of the G3
- FBP submachine gun, a 9 mm submachine gun
- Mauser–Vergueiro, a bolt-action rifle
- Lusa submachine gun, a compact 9×19mm Parabellum submachine gun
- Bravia Chaimite, an armored vehicle with all wheel drive axles
- M1940 helmet, a combat helmet

== Science and technology ==
- Familial amyloidotic neuropathy, a group of autosomal dominant diseases of the nervous system first described by Corino Andrade
- Circulatory system, Amato Lusitano discovered the circulation of the blood and the function of valves
- Cerebral angiography, developed by António Egas Moniz
- Lobotomy, pioneered by António Egas Moniz
- Tropical medicine, pioneered by Garcia de Orta
- Pyreliophorus, solar oven
- Herrmann wall telephone
- Prepaid Mobile Phone, a mobile phone for which credit is purchased in advance of service use
- Multibanco, an interbank network with a wide range of services that can be utilised through its machines
- All-on-4, a dental technique for total rehabilitation of the edentulous patient
- Via Verde, an electronic toll collection system
- Coloradd, a sign code for aiding colour blind people to recognise colours
- Passarola, a type of lighter-than-air airship, the predecessor of air balloon
- Artificial horizon sextant, an airship device to measure the distance between the horizon line and celestial bodies
- Microphone Windshield
- Electric wheelchair elevator
- Electronic cane for the blind
- Electrovisor, a tactile system for the blind to perceive images
- BASIL, vibratory system for deaf people to perceive sounds
- COPASI, software application for creating and solving mathematical models of biological processes
- Eslicarbazepine acetate, anticonvulsant medication
- Deaf-mute language, pioneered by Jacob Rodrigues Pereira
- ENER 1000, an early personal computer

== Literature ==
- Heteronym, a literary concept in which one or several imaginary character(s) are created by a writer to write in different styles
- Ultra-Romanticism, a literary movement derived from the Romanticism that took place in the second half of the 19th century

== See also ==
- Portuguese inventions
