= Sword of Honour (disambiguation) =

Sword of Honour is a trilogy of novels by Evelyn Waugh, set during the Second World War.

Sword of Honour may also refer to:

== Media ==
- Sword of Honour (1939 film), a British drama film
- Sword of Honour (2001 film), a British television film based on the novel series, with a script by William Boyd
- Sword of Honour (Australian TV series), a 1986 Australian miniseries
- Sword of Honour (video game), a 1992 game developed by Dynafield Systems for Amiga, Commodore 64 and PC DOS systems
- Kirpaan: The Sword of Honour, a 2014 Indian Punjabi-language film

== Military and martial awards ==
- One of the Weapons of Honour awarded by France
- Sword of Honour (Cranwell), awarded to officer cadets at the Royal Air Force College Cranwell
- Sword of Honour (Duntroon), awarded to cadets at the Royal Military College, Duntroon, Australia
- Sword of Honour (Kongo), a ceremonial sword of the Kingdom of Kongo
- Sword of Honour (New Zealand), an honour bestowed by Queen Victoria upon six Māori chieftains for service during the 1865–70 New Zealand Land Wars
- Sword of Honour (Pakistan), awarded to the best cadets at the Pakistan military academies
- Sword of Honour (Sandhurst), awarded to the best officer cadet at the Royal Military Academy Sandhurst, United Kingdom
- The honour swords that Lloyd's Patriotic Fund awarded between 1803 and 1809 to British Naval and Marine officers for courageous conduct
- Sword of Honour (HEMA), the trophy awarded at the annual jousting tournament of the British Armouries Museum
