= Pillory of Arcos de Valdevez =

- Pelourinho de Arcos de Valdevez
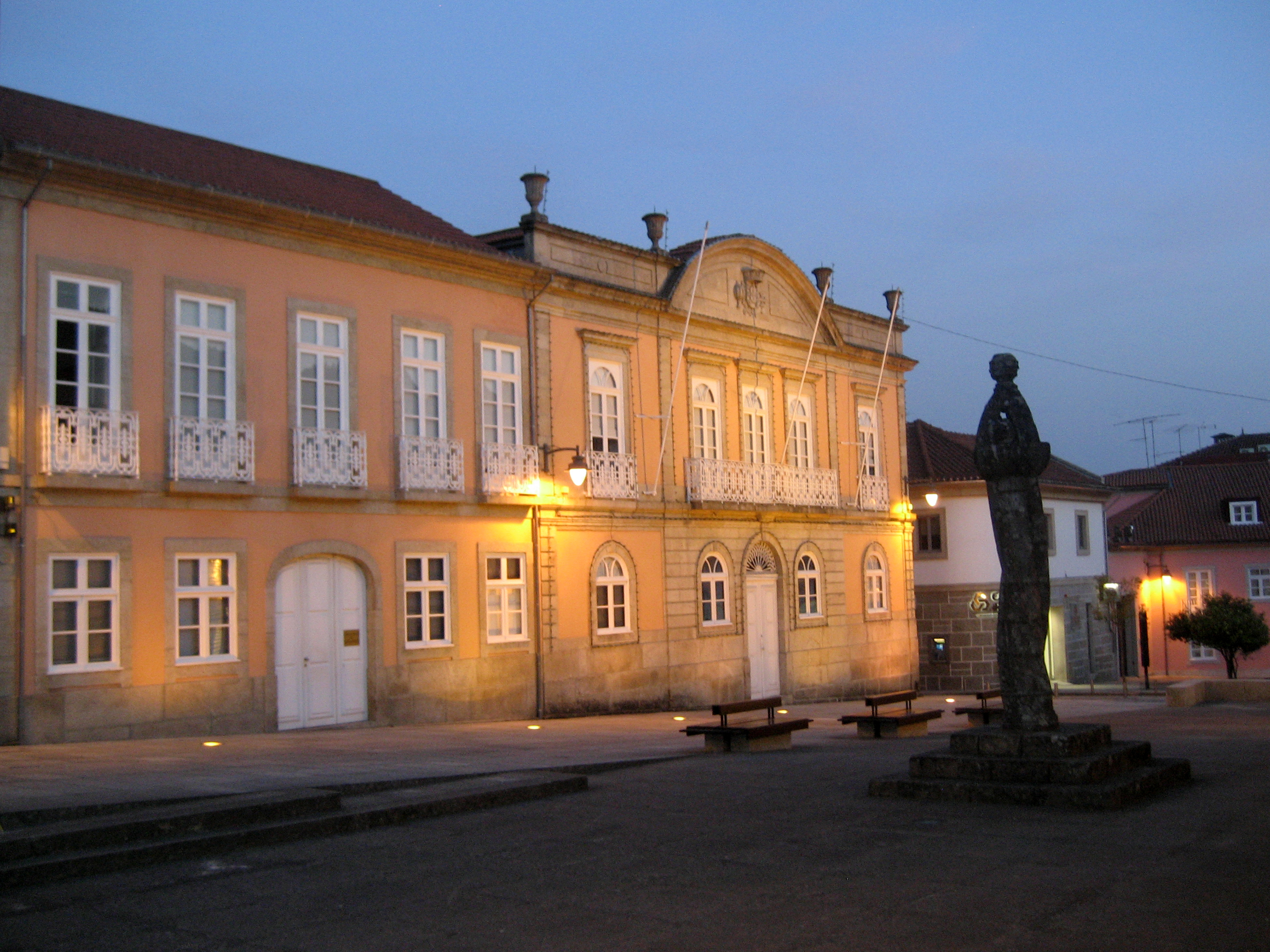
- A view of the pillory in the Praça do Município
- Interactive map of the Pillory of Arcos de Valdevez area

General information
- Type: Pillory
- Architectural style: Manueline
- Location: Arcos de Valdevez (Salvador), Vila Fonche e Parada, Portugal
- Coordinates: 41°50′46.6″N 8°25′5.3″W
- Owner: Portuguese Republic

Technical details
- Material: Granite

The Pillory of Arcos de Valdevez (Portuguese: Pelourinho de Arcos de Valdevez) is a 15th-century sculpted stone column with symbolic political, administrative and judicial significance, located in the civil parish of Arcos de Valdevez (Salvador), Vila Fonche e Parada, municipality of Arcos de Valdevez.

== History ==
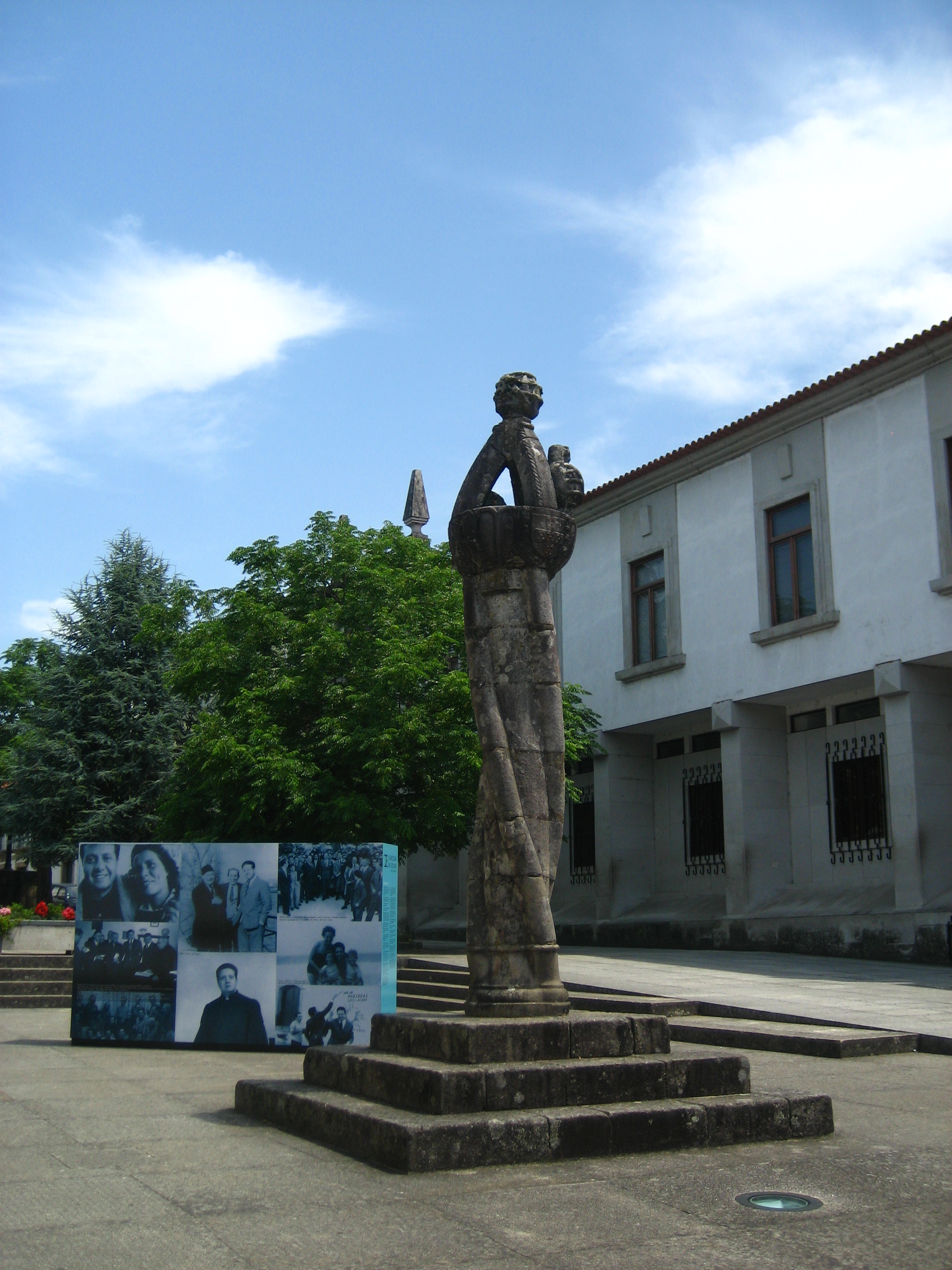
A view of the torus and steps of the pillory

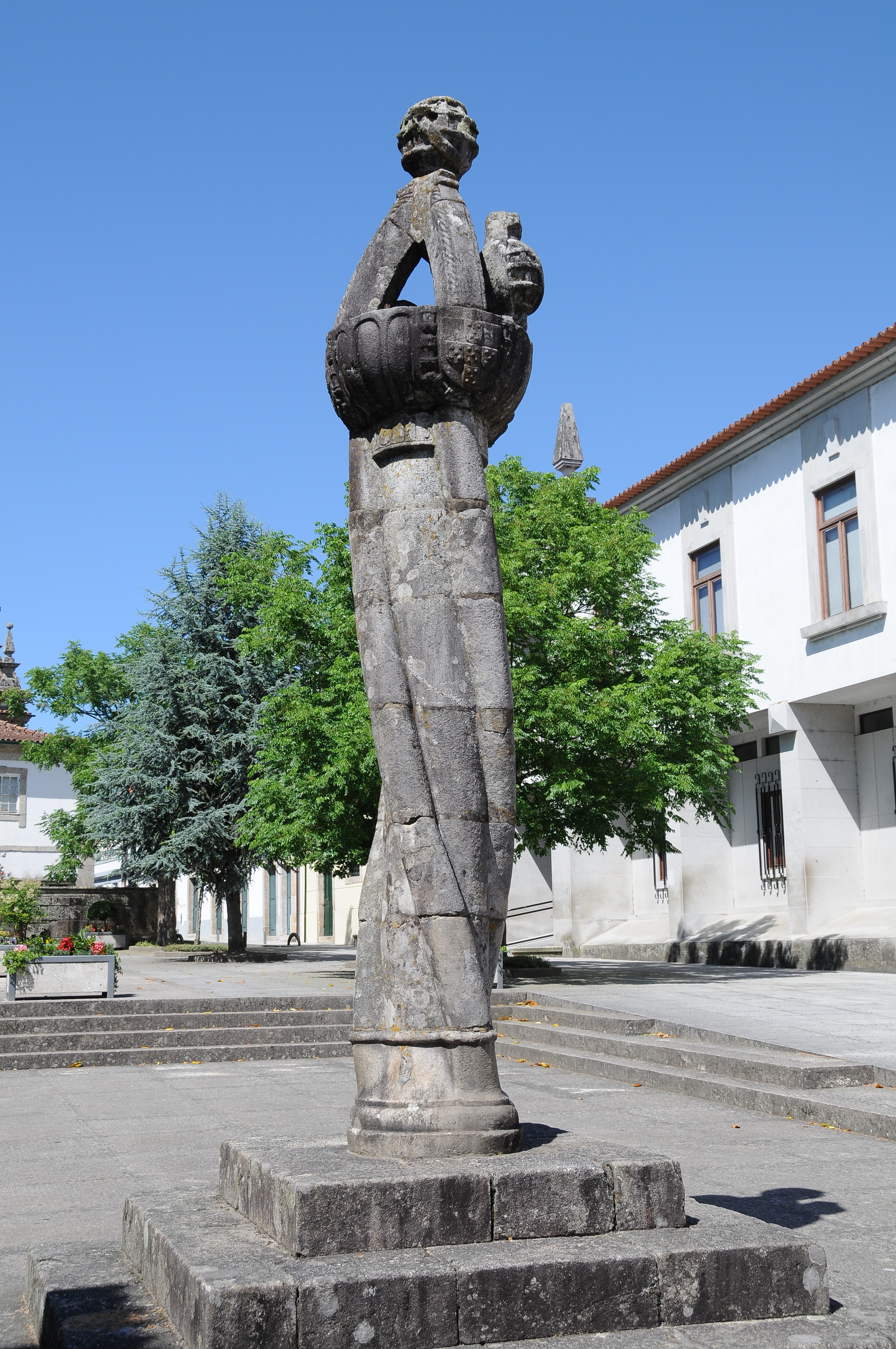
A detail of the pillory

On 4 March 1476, the title of Viscount of Vila Nova de Cerveira was bestowed on D. Leonel de Lima, by King D. Afonso V. Over time Lima became the signeurial master of Arcos de Valdevez.

The group is Manueline in style, architecturally, but also because of the ornamental elements identifying regal heraldry. It is also important to highlight the inscription, authored by João Lopes-o-Velho, who was active in northern Portugal and Galicia, between the 16th century and about 1559. Although there is no clear date, it is frequently referred to as dating from 1531 (António Matos Reis, 2000), suggesting its late Gothic and Manueline influences.

The settlement of Valdevez was, until the 12th century, the seat of the territory of Ribeira-Lima, due to its strategic position between northern Portugal and Galicia. During the Middle Ages, the local administration began to concentrate in Arcos, which was (as its name implies) founded near the old bridge crossing the Vez River. There were some authors that referred to its first foral, issued by D. Afonso Henriques in 1129, but the only document was the Manueline letter. King D. Manuel issued the first foral (charter) to the town, resulting in the later-construction of the pillory, by master stonemason João Lopes.

Until 1700, the pillory was in the centre of the municipality, but was transferred to Valeta, a site on the bank of the Vez River. During its "stay" in Valeta it was the centre of community life, with stories of young girls who washed clothes near the site, play or date, with a few notes transcribing:

Pelourinho da Valeta / vai-te deitar e dormir, / não sejas alcoviteiro / das criadas de servir
Pillory of Valeta / you will lie down and sleep, / do not pander / the maids to serve

By 1706, the area was known as the settlement of the Viscounts of Vila Nova da Cerveira. In the square of the municipality, was a golden pillory, which was moved to the nearby riverbank. This site had a judge, three aldermen and prosecutor, six judicial notaries, a judge for orphans, clerk, bailiff, two porters, municipal clerk, and some officers presented by King and others by the Viscount.

From the Memórias Paroquiais (dated 20 April 1758), abbot Miguel de Sousa described that the parish was part of the comarca of Valença. It had 135 neighbours and approximately 480 residents.

By the initiative of the municipal president, Pedro Pereira de Sousa e Brito, in 1895 the pillory was placed in its current location.

== Architecture ==
The pillory is situated in an isolated, urban position, in the historical centre of the town, in a square that is at a lower level then the southern facade of the parochial church. Nearby are two stone bunks.

The pillory is a granite structure, composed of a shaft on a four-step quadrangle, with small torus and shaft. A thick column comprising three smaller, addorsed columns, surmounted with frieze and caption:

IOANS / LOPEZ / MEFEZ

The capital is in the form of a bowl, with three shields of Portugal, interspersed with oval frames and surmounted by three rods. The three rods replicate the same alignment of small columns converge to an armillary spheres. Another, larger, decorates the group.
