= SIBS =

SIBS may refer to:

- Salk Institute for Biological Studies
- Sociedade Interbancária de Serviços S.A.
