= Padroso =

Padroso may refer to the following places in Portugal:

- Padroso (Arcos de Valdevez), a parish in the municipality of Arcos de Valdevez
- Padroso (Montalegre), a parish in the municipality of Montalegre
