= Sword of Honour (Kongo) =

A Sword of Honour (also known as Sword of Power, Mbele a Lulendo, or Mbele a Lusimba) is a ceremonial sword of the Kingdom of Kongo.

== History ==
The arrival of Portuguese explorers to the Kingdom of Kongo in 1483 was soon followed by that of the Catholic Church in this same region (See Catholic Church in Kongo). By the 16th century, the Christianization of the Kongo kingdom was well underway, and Afonso I of Kongo had begun creating a new branch of catholicism that included elements of Kongo theology to the beliefs of the Portuguese Catholic Church.

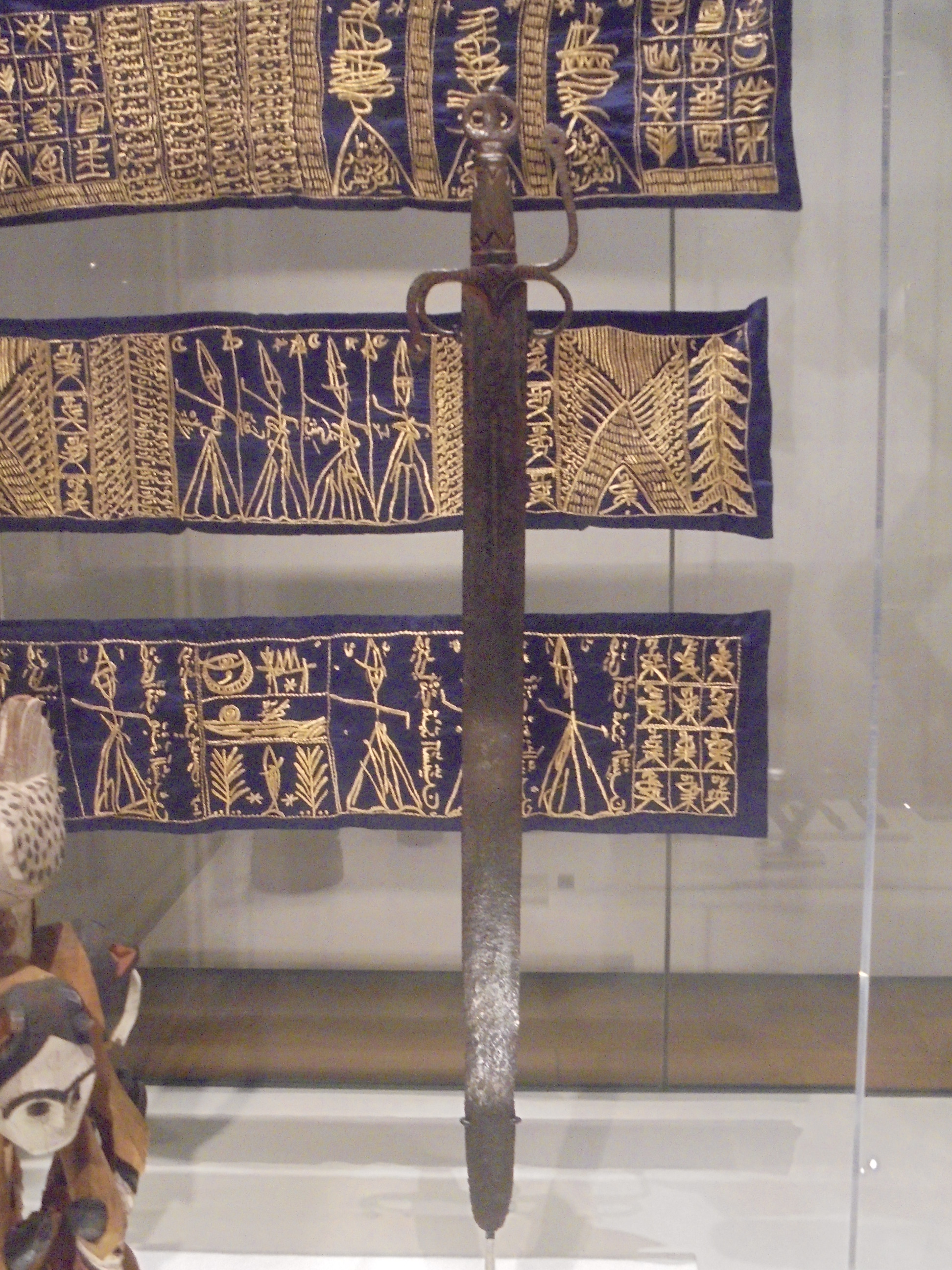
Sword of Honour (mbele a lulendo) of iron and wood.

This development of a Catholic Church in the Kongo led to the creation of a variety of artefacts that embodied these new traditions. Among them was the Sword of Honour.

As a local copy of swords originally imported by European settlers through the 15th and 16th century, the swords of honour, along with crucifixes, were offered to chiefs as part of their new royal regalia. Over time, they came to represent the power of the chief, village or kingdom as a whole.

Beyond their role as status symbols, it is suspected that the swords also played a ceremonial function in coronations, displays of allegiance, judicial activities, religious rituals and funeral observances. Some sources also suggest that the swords could have been used for executions, although the accuracy of the source is debated among scholars and other execution swords are known to have been used by the Bantu People of the Kongo Kingdom, such as the Ngulu swords.

After the death of their owners, the swords were either buried with them or passed down to their successors.

== Symbolism ==
Being primarily made of iron, the swords of honour fit within the long-dating tradition of Iron metallurgy in Africa, the material having been associated with historical kinship.

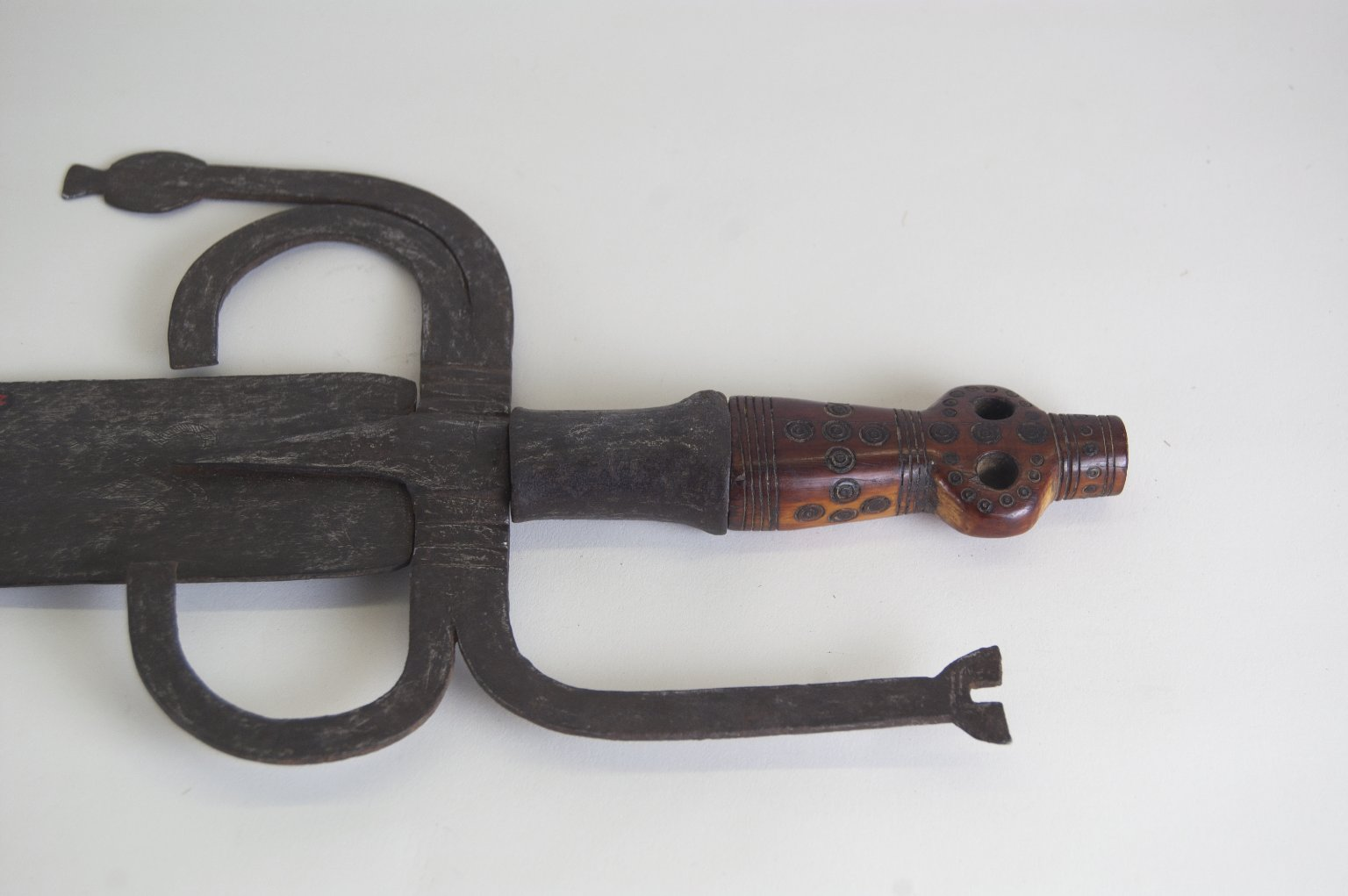
Details from the hilt of a Sword of Honour (Brooklyn Museum)

The shape of the sword references hispano-portuguese weapons of the 16th century. More specifically, the hilt of the sword of honour seems to echo that of weapons such as the Carracks black swords or the Rapier. Yet, it also differentiates itself from those through its S-shaped transverse loop.

Thought to represent a human figure, the hilt of the sword can be interpreted as a combination of Catholic and Kongolese religious symbolism. It is simultaneously the body of Christ on the cross, and a person with a raised right arm and lowered left arm. This latter description is, in Kongo spiritual and social systems, an image of the crossroad between life and death, as well as the balance brought about by a community ruler. The right arm held up “hails the law” (yamba mambu), while the left arm “cools the community” (lembika kanda). The gesture is thought to be associated with sangamento performances, as well as other spiritual objects of the region such as the Niombo funerary mannequin of the Bwemde people. Similarly, the crosses found on the pommel of the sword or at the ends of the guards can also be associated with this combination of Catholic and Kongolese theology.
