= Manuel António Gomes =

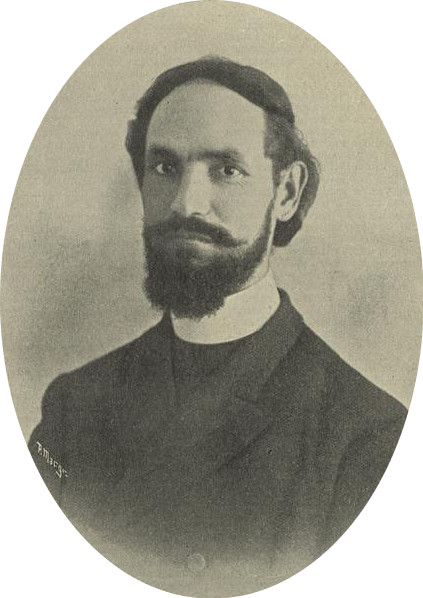
Father Himalaya, c. 1906

Manuel António Gomes (9 December 1868 – 21 December 1933) was a Portuguese Catholic priest, inventor and physicist. He was a very tall man, and was nicknamed Father Himalaya (in Portuguese: Padre Himalaya), a name he proudly used frequently. He was born at Santiago de Cendufe, Arcos de Valdevez in 1868 and died at Viana do Castelo in 1933.

Father Himalaya was a pioneer in Portugal of solar energy and other uses of renewable energy. He was a vegetarian and was interested in naturopathy, particularly fitotherapy and hydrotherapy. He studied in Paris with Marcellin Berthelot and developed mathematical and astronomical theories to construct innovative ways of concentrating solar radiation in order to maximise useful energy production. Gomes is the creator of the pyreliophorus, a series of reflecting mirrors to concentrate sunlight towards a common point in order to melt materials.

He lived in the United States and Argentina between 1927 and 1932. In Argentina he wrote a book about cosmology, his inventions and his innovative views on several areas of science.
