= Paulo Maló =

Portuguese dentist and businessman

- Born: Portuguese Angola
- Education: Faculty of Dental Medicine, University of Lisbon
- Occupation: Dental surgeon
- Years active: 1989–present
- Known for: All-on-4 development
- Medical career
- Profession: Dentistry
- Research: Dental implants

Paulo Maló is a Portuguese dentist and businessman.

== Early life and career ==
Paulo Maló was born in Portuguese Angola (an overseas territory of Portugal until 1975) and moved to mainland Portugal in the 1960s in order to study dental medicine in Lisbon. He received his graduate degree at the Faculty of Dental Medicine from the University of Lisbon in 1989. In 1995, he founded the Malo Clinic in Portugal, giving rise to Malo Clinic Health & Wellness, a healthcare and wellness business with presence in Portugal, Colombia, China, Israel, and United States. In 2003, together with other collaborators, he described the All-on-4 technique, entirely based on previous work and developments by Swedish researchers.

In 2019, Novo Banco took control of Malo Clinic, subsequently selling the group of dental clinics founded by Paulo Maló to the Atena Equity Partners fund. This transaction was carried out as part of a Special Revitalization Process (Processo Especial de Revitalização, PER, in Portuguese), through which creditors were forgiven over €40 million, with the Banco Espírito Santo heir institution forgiving approximately half of a debt exceeding €51 million.

Maló was sentenced in 2021 for dissipation of assets, concealed income, and breach of insolvency duties, at the request of Portugal's Caixa Geral de Depósitos (CGD), which had been unsuccessfully trying to collect a debt of over eight million euros for several years. Maló was subsequently banned from managing assets for six years.

His healthcare and wellness business have been reported in Portuguese and international media.
