= Aguiã =

- Civil parish
- Location in Portugal
- Coordinates: 41.884°N 8.432°W
- Country: Portugal
- Region: Norte
- Intermunic. comm.: Alto Minho
- District: Viana do Castelo
- Municipality: Arcos de Valdevez

Area
  - Total: 3.81 km^{2} (1.47 sq mi)

Population (2011)
  - Total: 705
  - Density: 190/km^{2} (480/sq mi)
- Time zone: UTC+00:00 (WET)
  - Summer (DST): UTC+01:00 (WEST)
- Postal code: 4970

Aguiã (Portuguese: [ɐɡiˈɐ̃]) is a freguesia ("civil parish") of Portugal, part of the concelho ("municipality") of Arcos de Valdevez, in the district of Viana do Castelo and the Norte region. The population in 2011 was 705, in an area of 3.81 km^{2}.
