= Arcos de Valdevez =

- Municipality
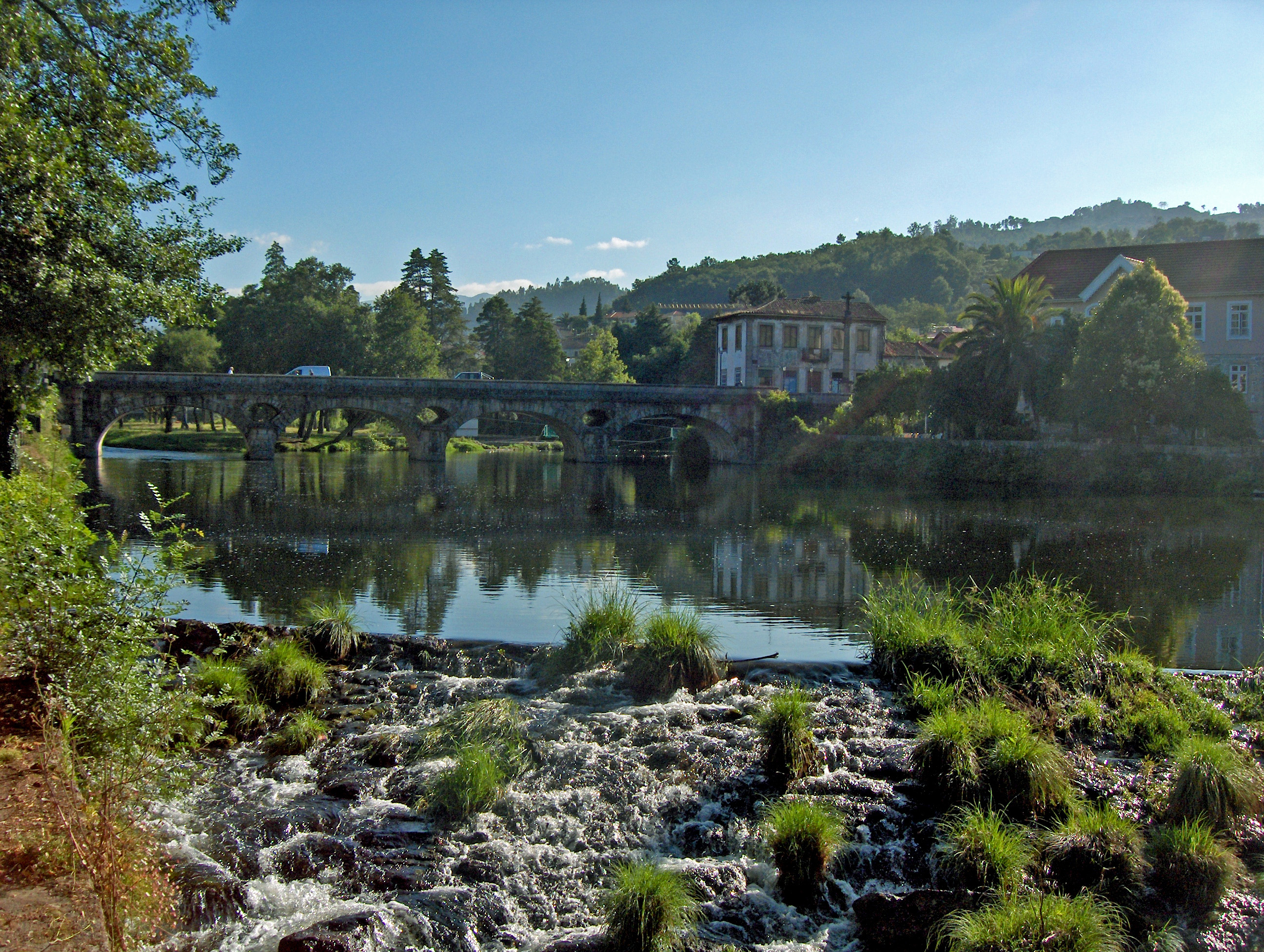
- The Roman bridge over the Vez River

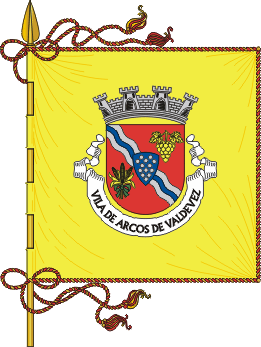
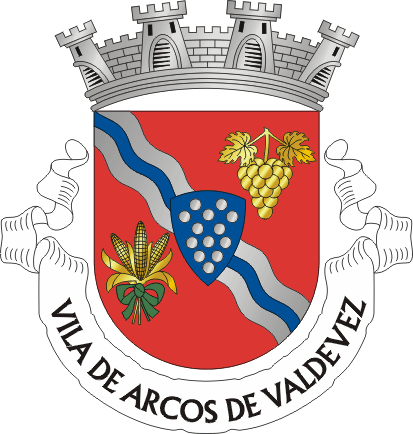
- Flag Coat of arms
- Interactive map of Arcos de Valdevez
- Location in Portugal
- Coordinates: 41°50′50″N 8°25′7″W
- Country: Portugal
- Region: Norte
- Intermunic. comm.: Alto Minho
- District: Viana do Castelo
- Parishes: 36

Government
  - President: Francisco Rodrigues de Araújo (PSD)

Area
  - Total: 447.60 km^{2} (172.82 sq mi)
- Elevation: 47 m (154 ft)
- Highest elevation: 1,416 m (4,646 ft)

Population (2011)
  - Total: 22,847
  - Density: 51.043/km^{2} (132.20/sq mi)
- Time zone: UTC+00:00 (WET)
  - Summer (DST): UTC+01:00 (WEST)
- Postal code: 4970
- Area code: 258
- Patron: São Paio

Arcos de Valdevez (Portuguese pronunciation: [ˈaɾkuʒ ðɨ ˌvaldɨˈveʃ]) is a municipality along the northern frontier of Portugal and Galicia (Spain). The population in 2011 was 22,847, in an area of 447.60 km^{2}. It is the largest municipality in area of the district of Viana do Castelo.

== History ==
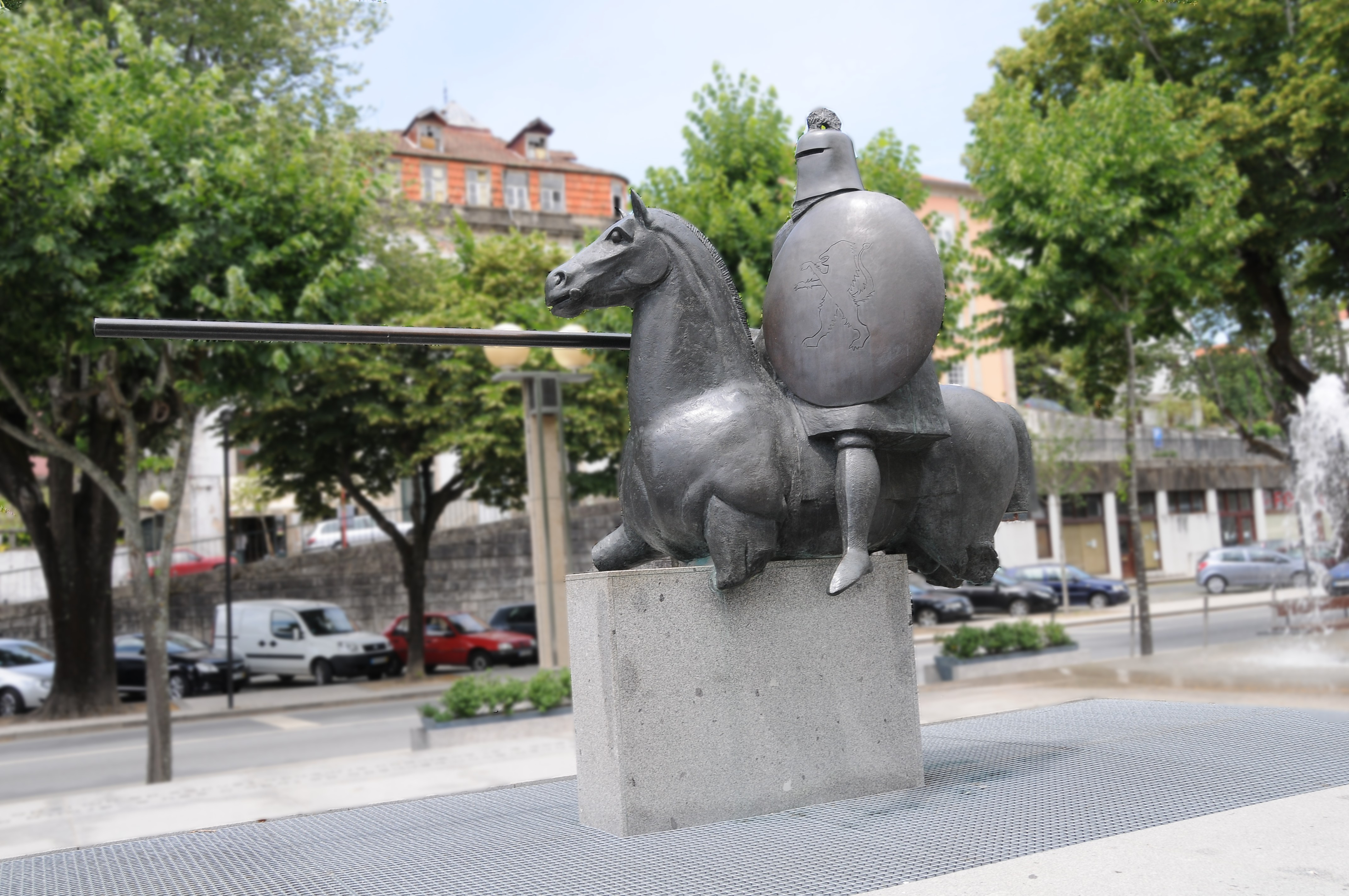
A statue that commemorates the historical Battle of Valdevez

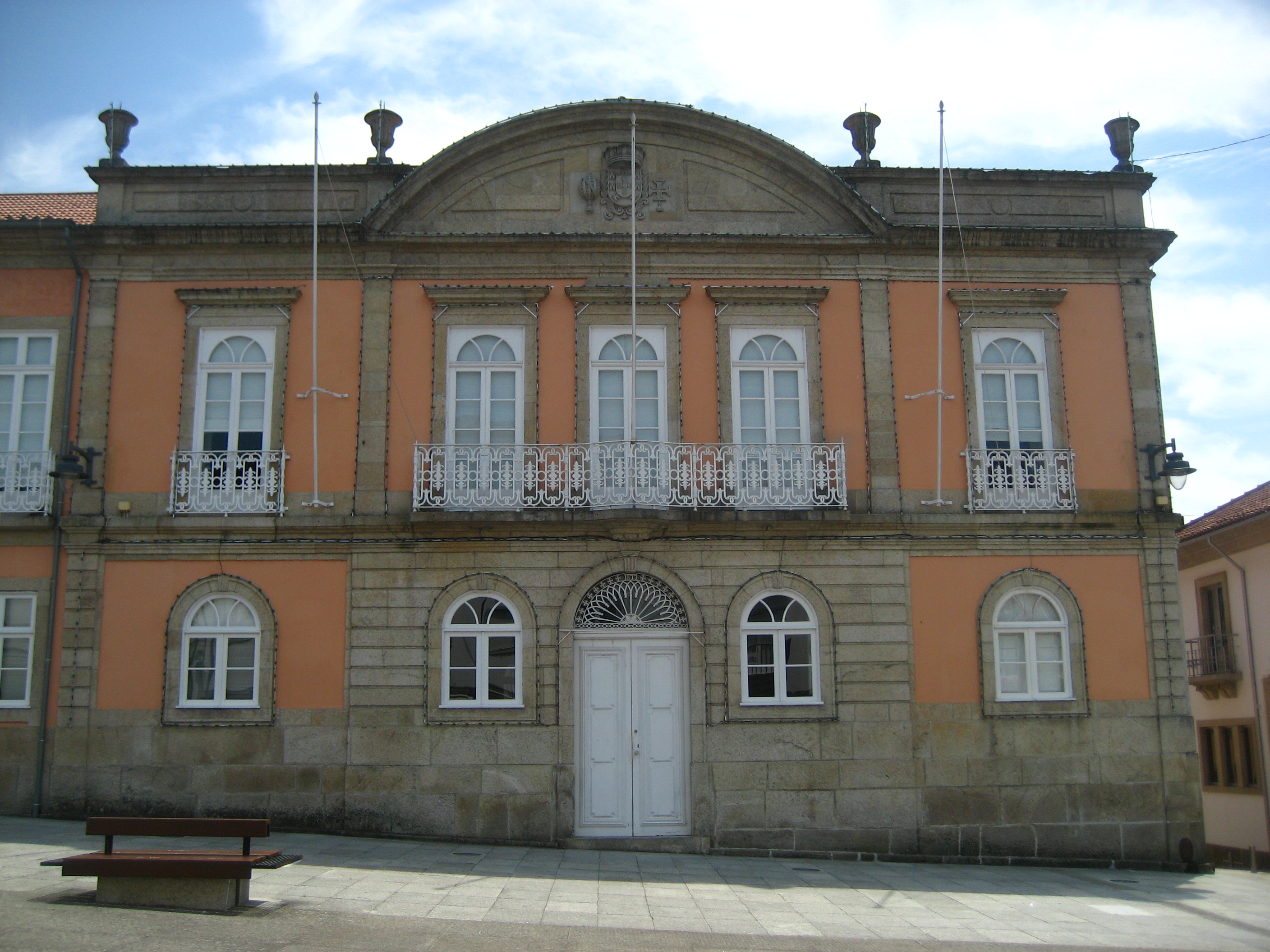
The Municipal City Hall in Arcos de Valdevez, showing the ornate nineteenth-century façade

The first settlements in the area of Arcos de Valdevez occurred between the fifth and third millennium B.C., verified by archaeological investigations from many of the funerary mounds within the municipality, such as Núcleo Megalítico do Mezio. This also includes many rock carvings and paintings that were found in the Gião archaeological station. This period of prehistory and the Roman occupation known not just for its influence on toponymy, were important for many of the defensive and habitation structures that dot the landscape of the municipality. These include many of the castros that exist throughout the area, and in particular, in the parishes of Ázere, Álvora, and Cendufe.

During the Middle Ages many of these proto-cultural sites were abandoned for medieval parishes or monasteries located along plains or atop strategic hills, such as the Monastery of Ermelo (Cistercians) or Santa Maria de Miranda (Benedictine). These areas facilitated settlement, which was tied to herding and seasonal cultivation, while the mountains provided many sources for game. The facility of settlement greatly enhanced its importance, since its proximity to Spanish territory favoured strategic expansion into the south: the number of medieval bridges in the area, such as in Vilela and Cabreiro improved further expansion.

In documents dating back to the tenth and eleventh centuries, there were several military, social centres, and infrastructures that had been built along these northern positions. A Roman-type bridge within the municipal limits, was constructed between the twelfth and thirteenth centuries, and first referenced during the named Inquirições de 1258 (1258 Inquiries), when the name Arcos appeared in Portuguese toponymy.

Although abandoned in the thirteenth century, the Castle of Santa Cruz in Vila Fonche, which predates the village, was one of the first human centers, helping to protect human populations and facilitate communication that crossed the bridges along the Vez River. By 1258, the castle controlled a geographic area that included the present boundaries of Arcos de Valdevez. Its importance along these trade and military routes influenced King Manuel I to elevate this "metro-pole" to the status of village in 1515.

Liberal reforms during the eighteenth century expanded the administrative limits of the municipality, with the annexation of the areas of Soajo, Ermelo, and Gavieira.

== Geography ==
=== Physical geography ===
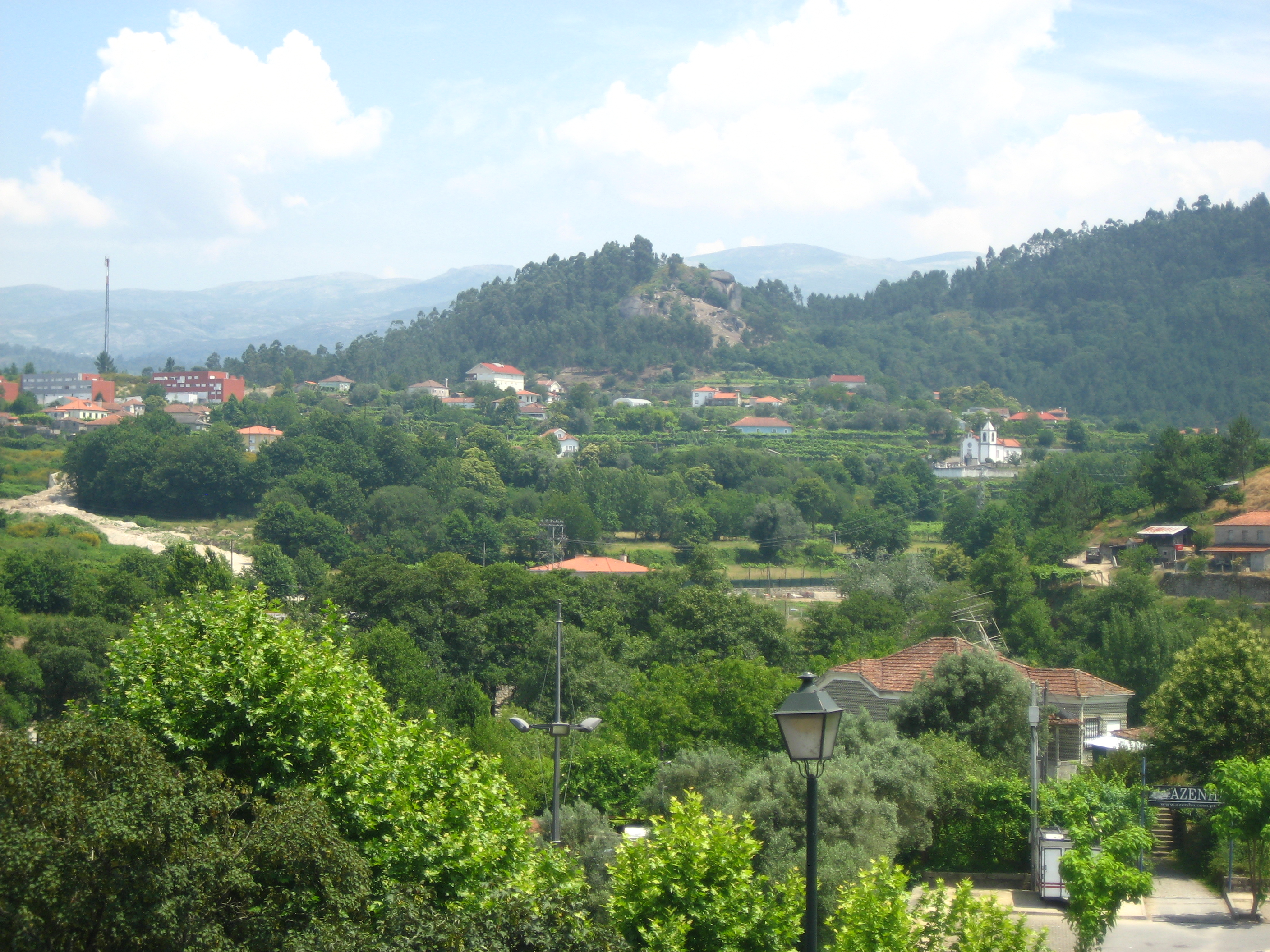
The green hilltops in the municipality of Arcos de Valdevez, within the civil parish of Salvador

Population of Arcos de Valdevez (1801–2011)
Year	Pop.	±%
1801	21,435	—
1849	25,824	+20.5%
1900	31,968	+23.8%
1930	32,163	+0.6%
1960	38,739	+20.4%
1981	31,156	−19.6%
1991	26,976	−13.4%
2001	24,761	−8.2%
2011	22,847	−7.7%

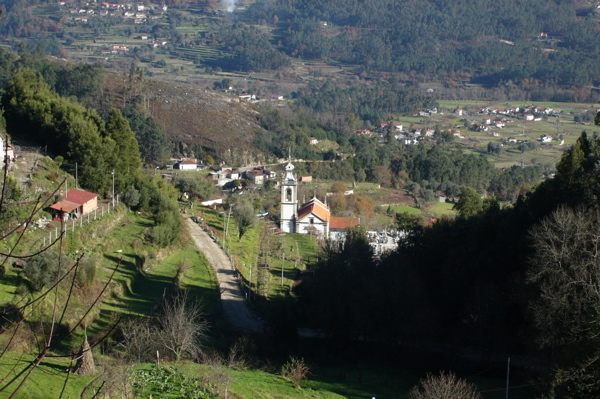
A view from the small civil parish of Eiras, showing the dispersed communities in the foothills of Peneda-Gerês mountain range

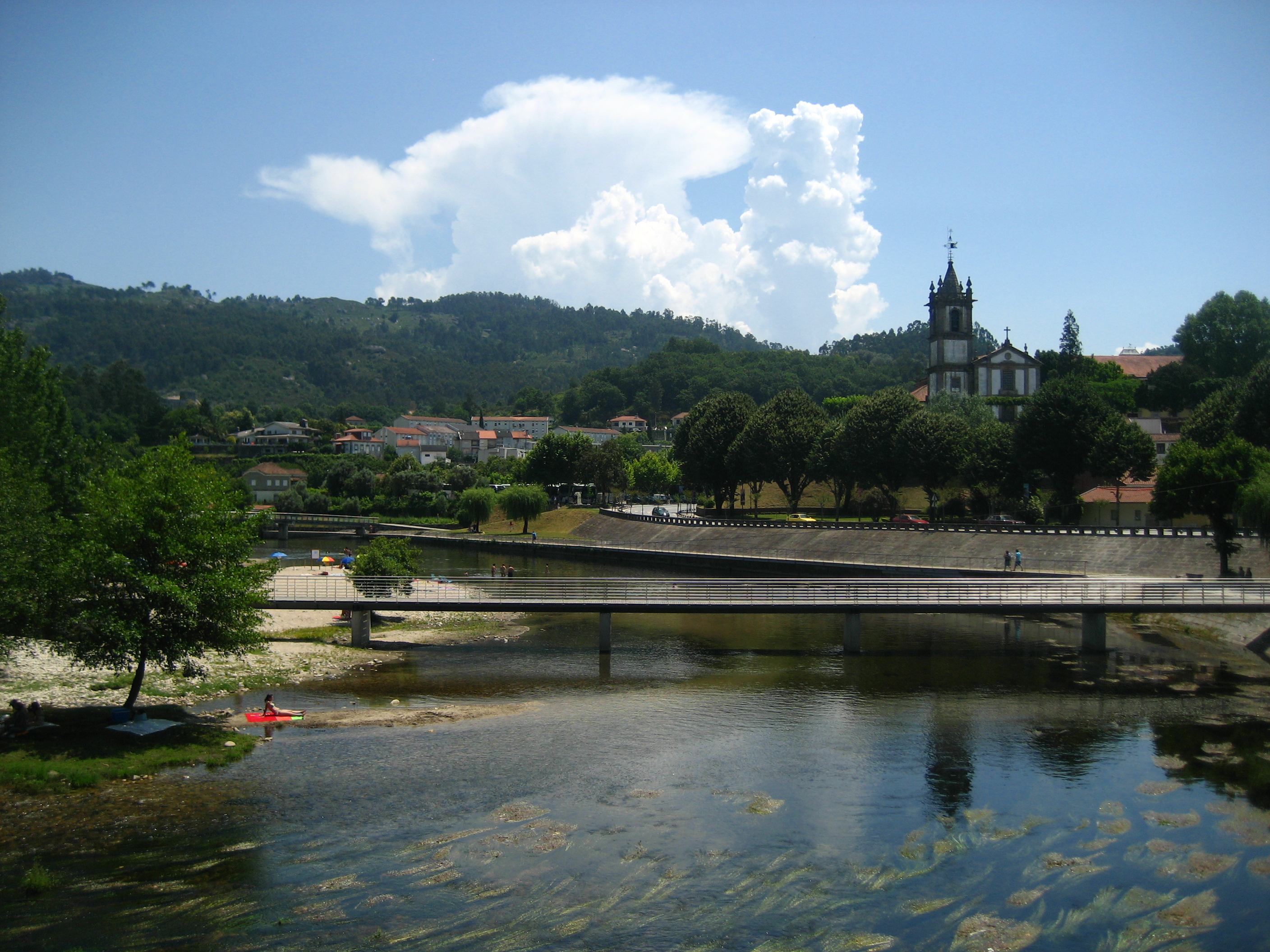
The River Vez, with the Church of the Espírito Santo in the background, within the parish of Gavieira

Arcos de Valdevez is situated in the northwest Portuguese peninsula of the historical province of Minho, in the district of Viana do Castelo. It is limited in the east by Spanish Galicia, in the south by the municipality of Ponte da Barca, in the southwest and west by Ponte de Lima, also by its western frontier with Paredes de Coura, in the north by Monção and northeast by Melgaço. Territorially, it occupies 20.18% of the Alto Minho subregion, 2.10% of the Norte region, or approximately 0.5% of continental Portugal.

The physical geography of the municipality consists of three fundamental morphological units: the river-valley depression occupied by the Rivers Vez and Lima, of which 35% of the municipality is located; the mountainous escarpment of the Peneda-Gerês; and an accidented area in the west that extends to the eastern limits of the municipality. The Vez valley, which crosses the territory from north to south, divides the mountainous western and eastern areas, and is the location of the principal activities of the territory.

=== Human geography ===
The municipal seat of Arcos de Valdevez, the city specifically, is composed of the civil parishes of Salvador and São Paio, which together account for a population of approximately 2204 inhabitants. It is characteristic of the larger area of northern Portugal, with a relatively homogeneous culture and population, dispersed within a similar scenic environment; it is one of the larger municipalities in Portugal, with an area of approximately 447.6 square kilometres (172.8 mi^{2}).

Administratively, the municipality is divided into 36 civil parishes (freguesias):

- Aboim das Choças
- Aguiã
- Alvora e Loureda
- Arcos de Valdevez (São Salvador), Vila Fonche e Parada
- Arcos de Valdevez (São Paio) e Giela
- Ázere
- Cabana Maior
- Cabreiro
- Cendufe
- Couto
- Eiras e Mei
- Gavieira
- Gondoriz
- Grade e Carralcova
- Guilhadeses e Santar
- Jolda (São Paio)
- Jolda (Madalena) e Rio Cabrão
- Miranda
- Monte Redondo
- Oliveira
- Paçô
- Padreiro (Salvador e Santa Cristina)
- Padroso
- Portela e Extremo
- Prozelo
- Rio de Moinhos
- Rio Frio
- Sabadim
- São Jorge e Ermelo
- Senharei
- Sistelo
- Soajo
- Souto e Tabaçô
- Távora (Santa Maria e São Vicente)
- Vale
- Vilela, São Cosme e São Damião e Sá

The largest of these parishes, Gavieira, Soajo, Cabreiro, Gondoriz, and Sistelo, are located in the mountainous areas that are part of Peneda-Gerês National Park.

The municipal seat is situated 36 kilometres (22 mi) from Braga Municipality and 90 kilometres (56 mi) from Porto, in the civil parish of São Salvador. The urban agglomerations of Arcos de Valdevez coincide roughly with the principal roadway, the Estrada Nacional E.N.101, that links Braga with Monção. The construction of the ancillary I.C.28 altered this pattern, permitting rapid access to Arcos de Valdevez from other regional centres.

Administratively, along with Viana do Castelo, Ponte da Lima, and Ponte de Barca, it is overseen by the VALIMA Associação de Municípios do Vale do Lima (Association of Municipalities of the Vale do Lima).

Since 1981 the population of the municipality has been in steady decline; relative to the 2008 census, the population of the municipality has decreased, but at a rate far less than following the urbanization brought on by the Carnation Revolution in Portugal. The result has been an emigrant population, with most activities and residential concentration within a small area along the southwest border. Consequently, the urban areas of Salvador (with an urban density of 1090 habitantes/km^{2}) and its neighbouring parishes (São Paio, Aguiã, and Giela) have seen some concentration.

== Architecture ==
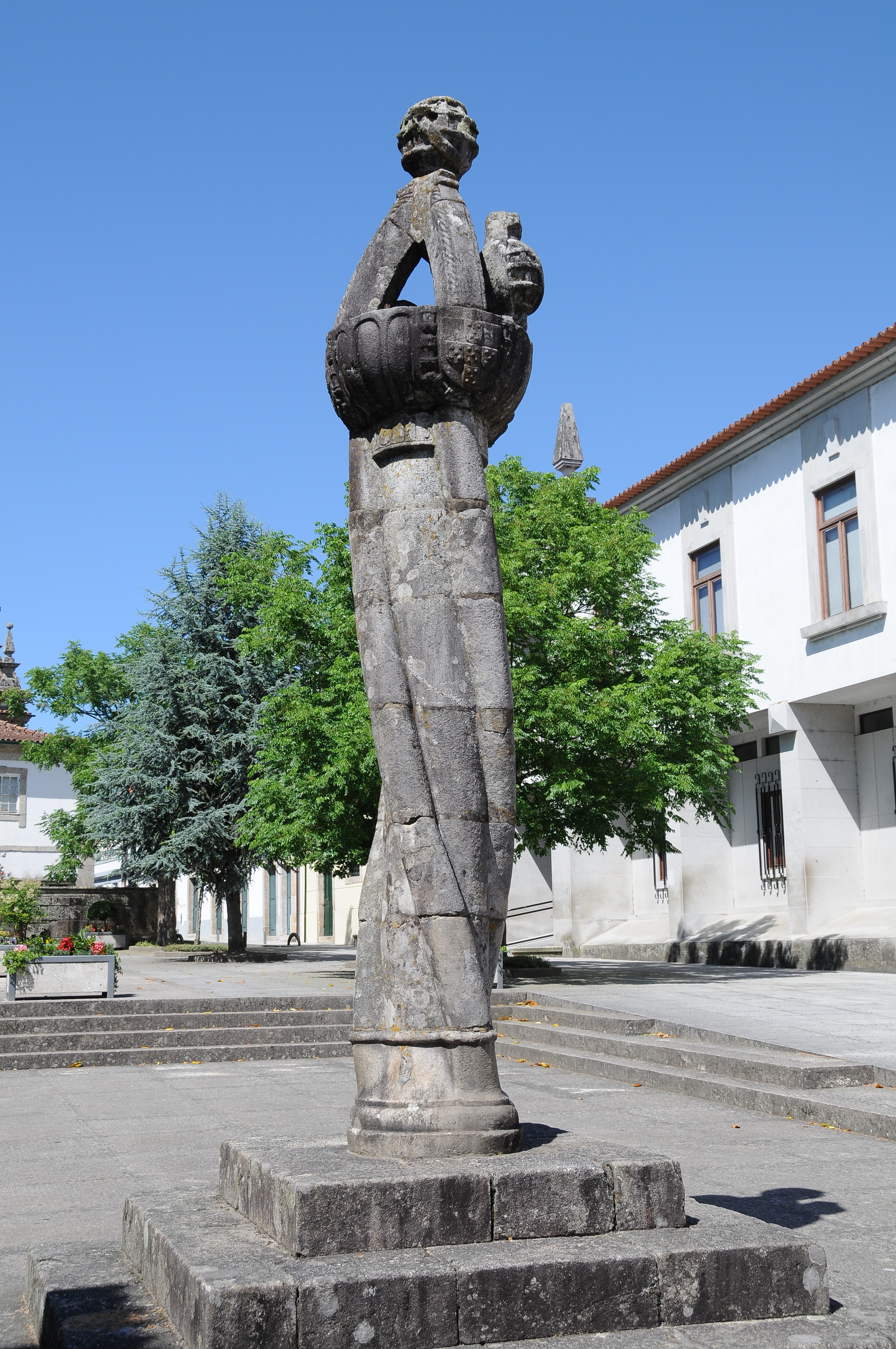
The Peolourinho de Arcos de Valdevez was constructed to mark the settlement of Portuguese territory in the area

=== Civic ===
- Bridge of Arcos de Valdevez (Portuguese: Ponte de Arcos de Valdevez) – constructed during the nineteenth century, beginning in 1876 and finalized in 1880, to replace the medieval construction. The monument is composed of stone blocks in four arcs with ample lateral accesses in a Roman style that open to a flat platform.
- Castro of Ázere (Portuguese: Castro de Ázere), a fortified castro placement in Monte, erected during the Iron Age, but inhabited from the eighth century B.C.;
- Dolmens of Serra do Soajo (Portuguese: Antas da Serra do Soajo), a group of dolmen constructions, in various states of ruin, used by the ancient settlers of the region, in the foothills of the Serra do Gêres, near Mezio and Cabana Maior;
- Manor of Quinta de Aboim (Portuguese: Solar da Quinta de Aboim) – located in the parish of Aboim das Choças, is an example of a nobleman's eighteenth-century manor house;
- Pillory of Arcos de Valdevez (Portuguese: Pelourinho de Arcos de Valdevez) – in 1515 King Manuel I had this stone structure built in the main square, but it was moved in 1700 from the Municipal Square (Portuguese: Praça Municipal) to the river's edge, until finally being re-erected in a small square along a strip near the main church. In 1998, it was replaced in its present location. Designed by João Lopes, it is a single structure in the form of a twisted colonnade, surmounted by the Portuguese military sphere and national shield, atypical of common pillory use.
- Summer-House of Requeijo (Portuguese: Casa Solarenga de Requeijo) – a manor house with a characteristic rectangular plan from the eighteenth century, and constructed with two towers, three-floors, and a lateral Franciscan chapel. The main floor is encircled with elaborate entrances and columns.

=== Religious ===
- Chapel of Nossa Senhora da Conceição (Portuguese: Capela da Nossa Senhora da Conceição) – a seventeenth-century chapel dedicated to Our Lady of the Conception;
- Church of Arcos de Valdevez (Portuguese: Igreja Matriz de Arcos de Valdevez) – this church was constructed under the guidance of King Pedro II, during the eighteenth century over the medieval ruins. Its interior is richly decorated with gold-leaf cornices and wood-carved ornamentation from the late eighteenth to nineteenth centuries. In 1776 the Calvário chapel, along the southern annex, was completed in the Rococo style;
- Church of Nossa Senhora da Lapa (Portuguese: Igreja da Nossa Senhora da Lapa) – was constructed to the cult of Nossa Senhora da Lapa, with influences from the Beira region, it was completed in 1767, and is characterized by a central plan with a tower and the main chapel designed by André Soares in the Baroque style. The interior, including the altars and ornamentation was completed in the Rococo-style.
- Church of São Bento (Portuguese: Igreja de São Bento) – dedicated to Saint Benedict, is located on a prominent overlook, west of the village, it was completed in 1674, incorporating the older Franciscan Monsatary (today survived by a lone house), and decorated with azulejo and diverse religious images from the seventeenth century;
- Church of São Paio (Portuguese: Igreja de São Paio) – its construction was begun in 1781 and completed in the nineteenth century, it includes a single bell and staircase, apparently influenced by architecture in Oporto. Azulejos on the front façade date back to the nineteenth century.
- Church of the Espírito Santo (Portuguese: Igreja do Espírito Santo) – the church dedicated to the Holy Spirit, was established by the Confraria do Espírito Santo in 1681, in the Mannerist-style and remodelled during the nineteenth century in the neo-Classical tradition. Its interior shows notable examples of seventeenth-century paintings, as well as a sculpted pulpit that is attributed to the Arcuense manuel Gomes, based on original plans by the painter Álvares Costa.
- Church of the Misericórdia e Cruzeiro (Portuguese: Igreja da Misericórdia e Cruzeiro) – in 1595, the Confraria da Misericórdia (the Brotherhood of the Misericórdia) was established in Arcos, and promoted the construction of the villages first temple, which was completed in 1710. The church presents a Rococo architecture, that is richly decorated in Baroque (the main and side doorways) and neo-Classical (pulpits and sacristy) elements. Located in an enclosed lateral square, formerly the old cemetery, it is an example of eighteenth-century design, with a base decorated with representations of the life of Christ.
- Monastery of Ázere (Portuguese: Mosteiro de Ázere) – a Benedictine monastery
- Monastery of Ermelo (Portuguese: Mosterio de Ermelo), a Romanesque monastery and church, but also a group of churches that correspond to the area of the River Lima, it was heavily altered in 1760. From the writings of Carlos Alberto F. de Almeida (1988), the decoration of the capitals and corners show an evolution in comparison to those in the Minho watershed, comparable to those in Valdreu (Terras de Bouro), Fervença (Celorico de Basto), and Ferreira (Paços de Ferreira).

== Sport ==
The municipal government has funded several sports related projects to develop local athletics, including the construction and maintenance of the following:

- Arcos de Valdevez Municipal Pool (Portuguese: Piscina Municipal de Arcos de Valdevez), that includes a 47m x 17m x1.8m deep pool, a health club, a commercial area with three shops and snack-bar; the building offers swimming lessons, hydrogymnastics, hydro-therapy, Jacuzzi, as well as aerobics and training services;
- Coutada Municipal Stadium (Portuguese: Estadio Municipal da Coutada), that supports the activities of the local schools, sports teams (especially soccer and rugby), as well as athletics that include infrastructures for track events, administration, receptions, and a bar.

In addition, there are several local sports organizations and clubs that benefit from the local infrastructures or offer different sporting services; these include the local equestrian and nautical club.

The local football (soccer) club in Arcos is the C.A. Valdevez (Portuguese: Clube Atlético de Valdevez), established in 1945, and currently playing the Portuguese Second Division Series A league. Arcos de Valdevez has a rugby team, Clube de Rugby de Arcos de Valdevez.

== Notable people ==
- Mariana Joaquina Pereira Coutinho (1748–1820) a courtier and salonist for queen Maria I of Portugal
- Manuel António Gomes (1868 in Santiago de Cendufe – 1933) a Catholic priest, inventor and physicist.
- Abílio Rodas de Sousa Ribas (1931–2025) a Roman Catholic bishop emeritus of São Tomé and Príncipe
- Pedro Tiba (born 1988), known as Tiba, a footballer with over 400 club caps
