= Herrmann wall telephone =

Telephone

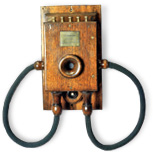
Wall telephone developed by Herrmann, part of the Communication Museum in Lisbon.

The Herrmann wall telephone, also known as the "privileged phone", was a type of telephone, created by the Portuguese inventor, Maximiliano Augusto Herrmann, in 1880. The pioneering use of buttons to activate the telephone played a fundamental role to the opening of public lines in the main cities of Portugal. The telephone was composed by a double earpiece, made with long flexible tubes, and a transmitter fixed to main body of the machine.

Its inventor, Maximiliano Augusto Herrmann (1832–1913), worked for the North and East Portuguese Railway Company (Portuguese: Companhia dos Caminhos-de-ferro do Norte e Leste) as telegraph lines inspector. He later opened a workshop in Lisbon dedicated to the production of precision instruments.

== See also ==
- Telecommunications in Portugal
