= Vez River =

River in Viana do Castelo, Portugal

Coordinates: 41°54′10″N 8°26′24″W

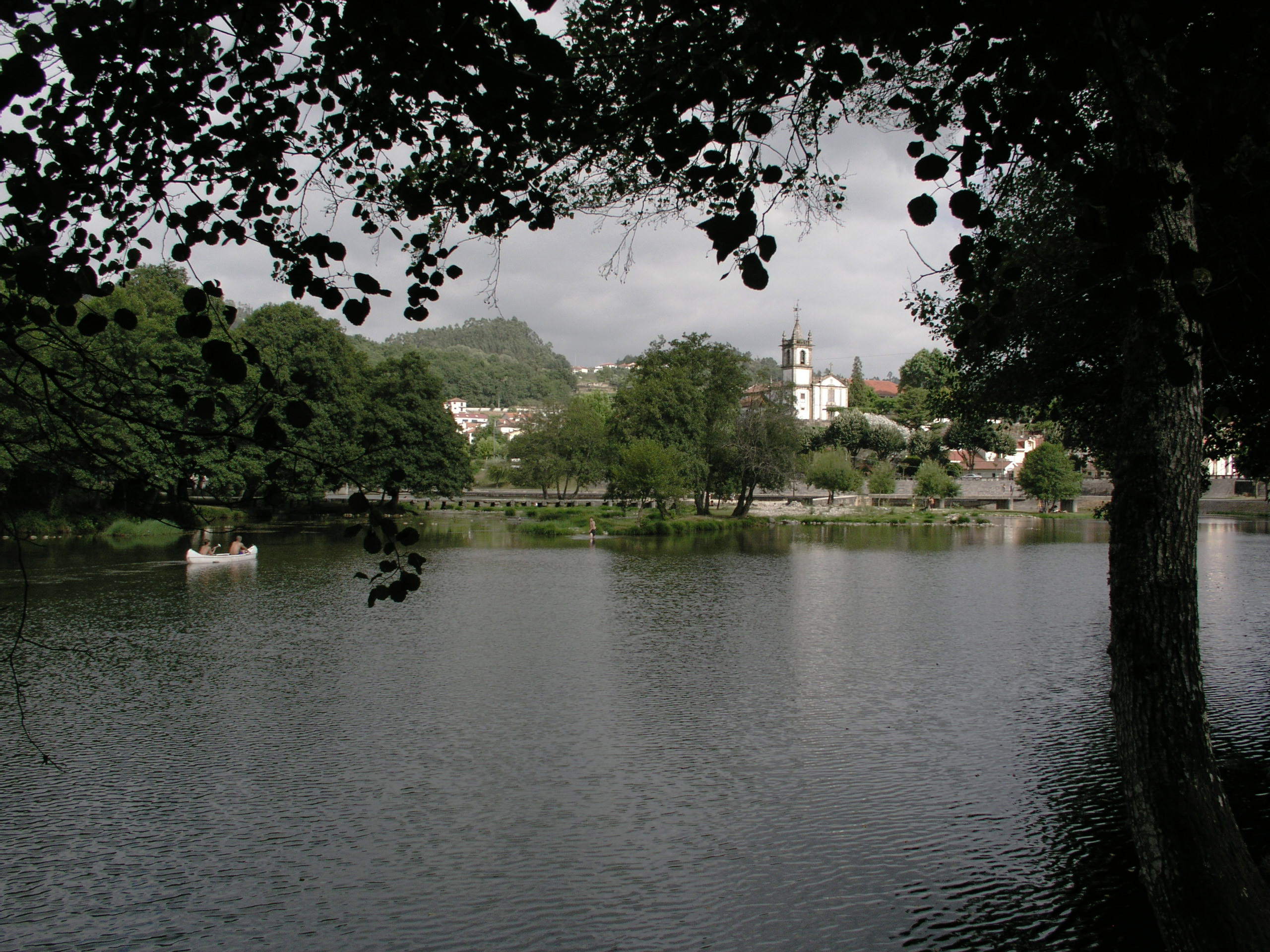
Arcos de Valdevez, Portugal.

The Vez River (Portuguese: Rio Vez, Portuguese pronunciation: [veʃ]) is a river in Portugal. It is approximately 36 kilometres (22 mi) long.

== See also ==
- Rivers of Portugal
