= All-on-4 =

Prosthodontics procedure

Technique depicted in 3D video

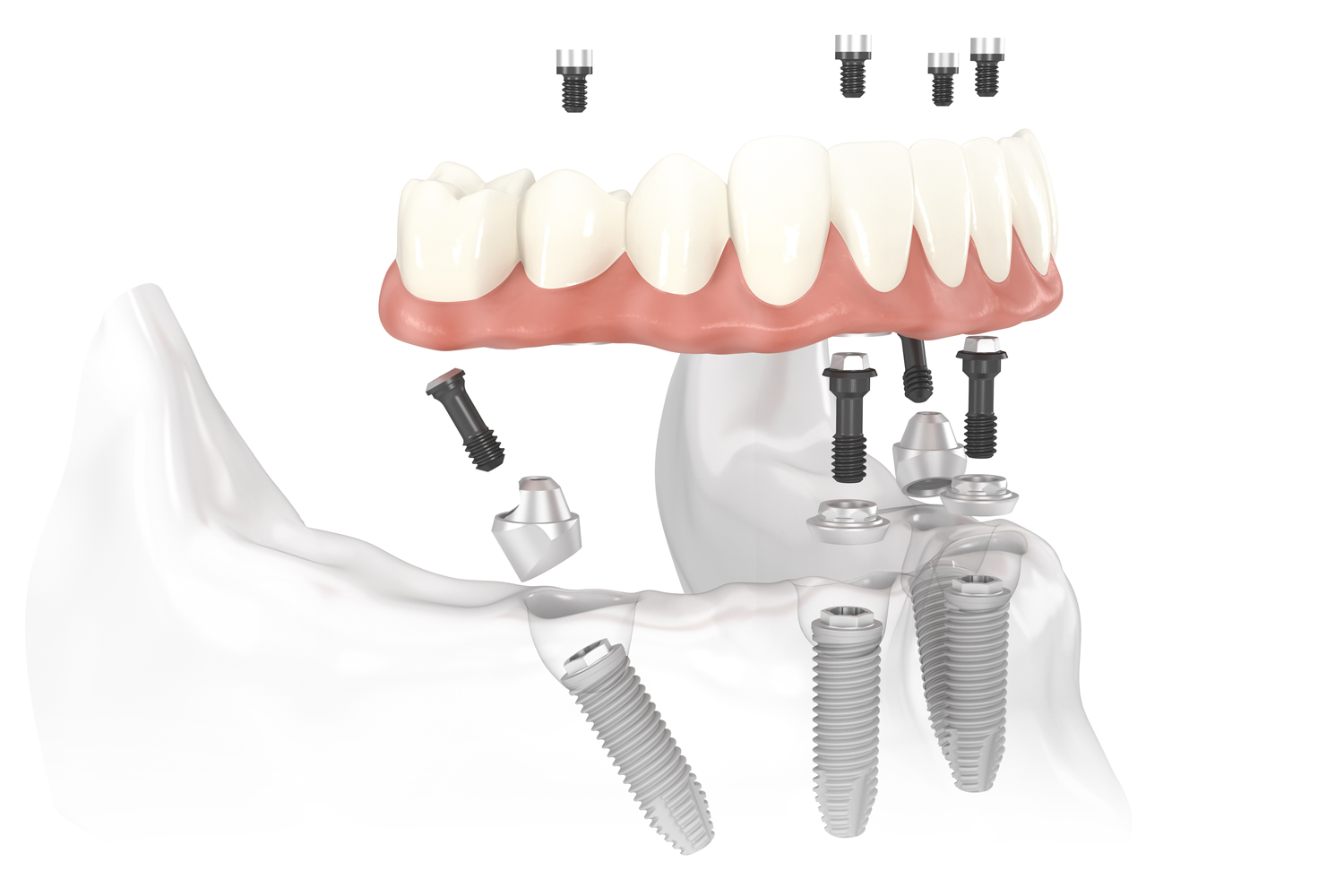
This image shows how Nobel Biocare's All-on-4 solution works

The term All-on-4, also known as All-on-Four and All-in-Four, refers to 'all' teeth being supported 'on four' dental implants. The name All-on-4 is a registered trademark of Nobel Biocare, used globally for both dental products and services. The treatment concept is a prosthodontics procedure for total rehabilitation of the edentulous (toothless) patient, or for patients with badly broken down teeth, decayed teeth, or compromised teeth due to gum disease. It consists of the rehabilitation of either edentulous or dentate maxilla and / or mandible with fixed prosthesis by placing four implants in the anterior maxilla, where bone density is higher. The four implants support a fixed prosthesis with 10 to 14 teeth, and it is placed immediately, typically within 24 hours of surgery.

The All-On-4 solution, with the latest technology in computer aid design/Mill (cad/cam) has evolved including the All-on-bar concept, which is adding a milled titanium bar structure to the dental implants, which helps them working together to protect the implants from failure, even after the hybrid bridge is broken. This concept helps the clinician provide a better long-lasting solution, instead of a conversion-denture which is a chair side repair and modified denture. The All-On-Bar reduces the appointments, eliminating the Denture Conversion technique, by replacing it with a long lasting hybrid. Some patients keep this option as their final due to a lower budget or because the space is limited for other final solutions.

PMMA (polymethyl methacrylate AKA acrylic) or denture teeth over the titanium bar wears out over time and needs replacement, this is a controversial topic since the PMMA has the advantage of being shock absorbent. This helps the implants receive less stress during mastication forces but keeping a solid structure on the inside. Many professionals think this is a better solution, keeping in mind that the bridge can be switched to a new one a few years after.

In recent years zirconium has become a highly researched material and has shown to be one of the best options for the prosthetic teeth used in the All-on-4 procedure. Implants created from zirconium have many benefits and are much more durable than your average, run of the mill ceramic or PMMA implants. Unlike dentures which can slip out of place or ceramic and PMMA veneers which are prone to chip, zirconium implants offer greater longevity. Thus, they are often seen as a lifelong investment rather than a temporary solution. Zirconia is also a natural compound, and its translucent material allows light to pass through, creating a more natural and whiter smile compared to more traditional materials that block the light, making teeth appear false.

Implant manufacturer Nobel Biocare AB of Gothenburg, Sweden, was among the first to identify the evolution of the All-on-4 technique as a potential valid and cost-effective alternative to conventional implant techniques, and funded studies by Portuguese dentist Paulo Maló to determine the efficacy of this approach. During this time, this technique was also used by various other clinicians around the world.

The all-on-4 concept was consolidated even before its name was coined in 2003, by the works of Per Ingvar Brånemark and colleagues from the late 1960s with the installation of 4 (or 6) implants to support a fixed full-arch prosthesis in the maxilla or mandible, once again by Brånemark and colleagues from the early 1990s with their new protocol involving prefabricated components and surgical guides and immediate loading of the permanent full-arch fixed prosthesis installed on the same day, the so-called Brånemark Novum method, by the work of Krekmanov and colleagues from the early 1990s, with their idea of tilting posterior mandibular and maxillary implants for improved prosthesis support, and by the work of Mattsson and colleagues from the early 1990s with four to six implants in the maxilla having the most posterior implants on each side angulated.

Therefore, the All-on-4 technique is actually more about coining a new name than a new technique. The All-on-4 is not an invention, but rather a treatment technique that has evolved over time, and has the following features:

- four dental implants to support a full fixed bridge (documented since 1977)
- the use of angulated implants in the back to overcome bony deficiencies or anatomical structures (documented since 1990)
- immediate loading (documented since 1990)

The All-on-4 treatment concept is a prosthodontic procedure (i.e. replacement of missing teeth) that provides a permanent, screw-retained, same-day replacement for the entire upper and / or lower set of teeth with a bridge or denture. The procedure is best for patients with significant tooth loss or decay, and for people whose bone loss in the jaw area prevents them from getting conventionally oriented (vertical) dental implants. Often, tooth loss is accompanied by loss of the jaw bone, which poses the problem of reconstruction of the jaw bone requiring bone grafting. Whereas in cases of tooth loss alone, a white only bridge, known as fixed prosthetic 1 (FP1) is sufficient, cases of advanced bone loss require prosthetics that replace all of the missing structures and termed fixed prosthetic 3 (FP3). The All-on-4 technique takes advantage of the dense bone that remains in the front part of the jaws, and by placing the two posterior implants on an angle to avoid the sinus cavities in the upper jaw and the nerve canal in the lower jaw.

The cost of the All on 4 procedure varies based on the final prosthetic material. Acrylic resin teeth over titanium bar is substantially cheaper resulting in a total cost of around $30K per arch/jaw in the United States. Premium prosthetic materials like Zirconium can result in a total treatment cost between $36K to $40k per arch/jaw in the United States. The cost of all on 4 dental implants are similar in Europe and in the UK but with the rising popularity of dental tourism the average costs are significantly lower (50%-70%) in countries such as Thailand, Mexico and Turkey. For the implementation to be successful a careful analysis of the bone structure needs to be made. The most ideal way to evaluate the bone is by a cone beam computed tomography (CBCT) scan. The All-on-4 protocol is for at least four implants to be placed in a jaw. The back implants are typically angled approximately 30 to 45 degrees from the occlusion (biting plane). The implant is placed in front of the maxillary sinus in the upper jaw (maxilla), and in front of the menial nerve in the lower jaw (mandible). The head of the implant emerges in approximately the second premolar position. This will allow a molar tooth to be cantilevered posterior, resulting in a denture or bridge with approximately twelve teeth.
