= Pyreliophorus =

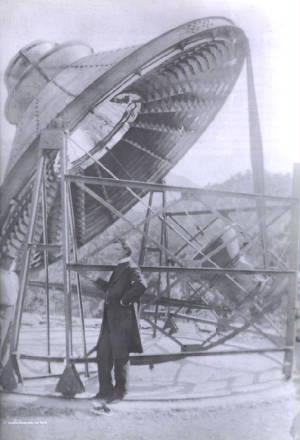
The Pyreliophorus

The Pyreliophorus was a device similar to a burning glass, created by the Portuguese priest Manuel António Gomes, also known as padre Himalaya, whose objective was to melt many different types of materials using solar energy. The device used several reflecting mirrors to concentrate the sunlight into a common point. With this device, it was possible to reach a temperature of around 3500 °C, enough to melt many types of metals and rocks. Unlike a common burning glass, the Pyreliophorus uses a concentric parabolic array of mirrors to concentrate the sun light into a common point, instead of a lens. The device uses a clock system that makes the mirror array concentric axis rotate along the sun alignment.

This device was one of the main attractions on the Saint Louis World's Fair in 1904, and it was awarded with two gold medals and with one silver medal. Himalaya protected his Pyreliophorus using the patent system in many jurisdictions, including the British one on the patent application number GB190116181 or in the American with the patent application US797891.

== Gallery ==
Some figures of the Himalaya's British patent application

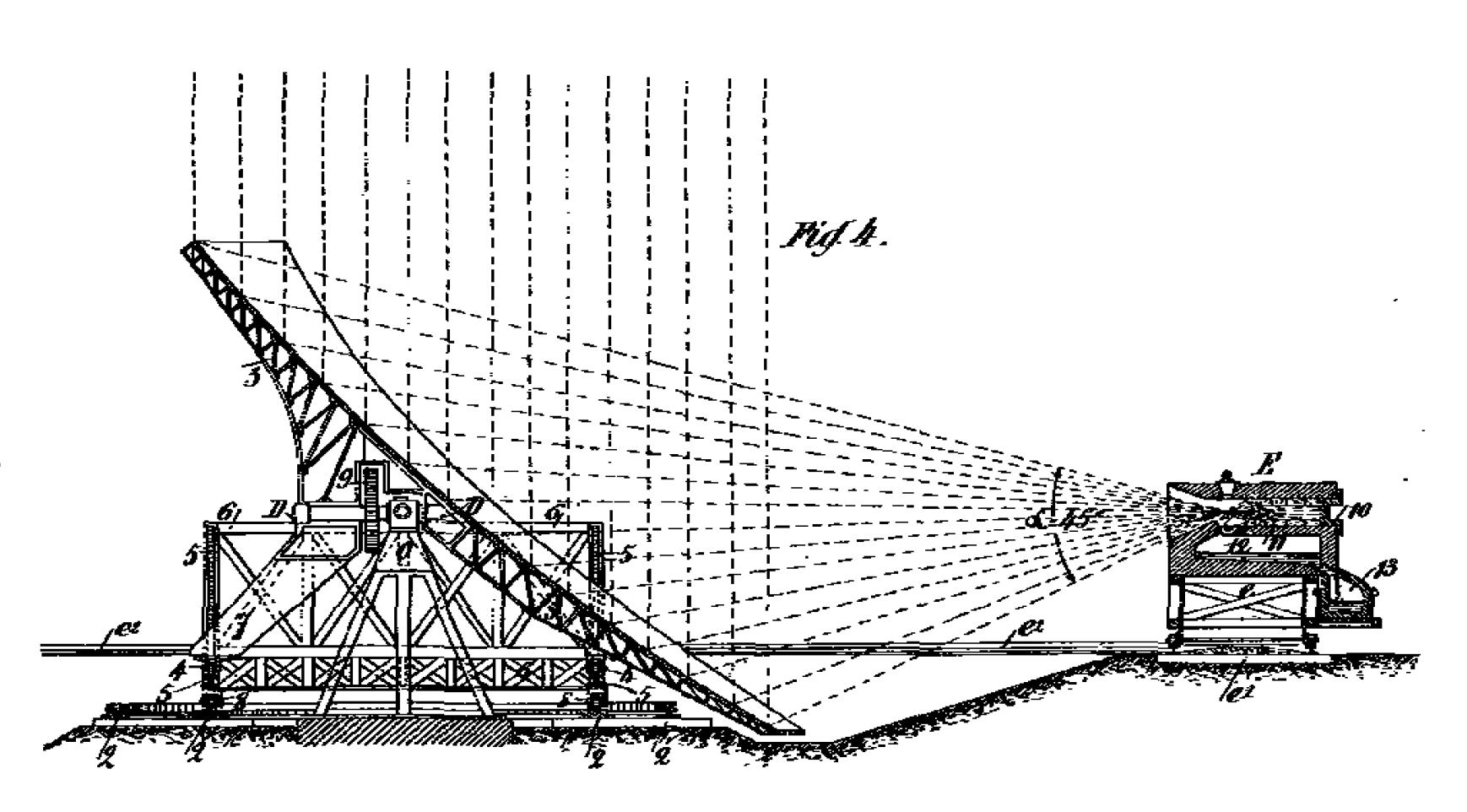

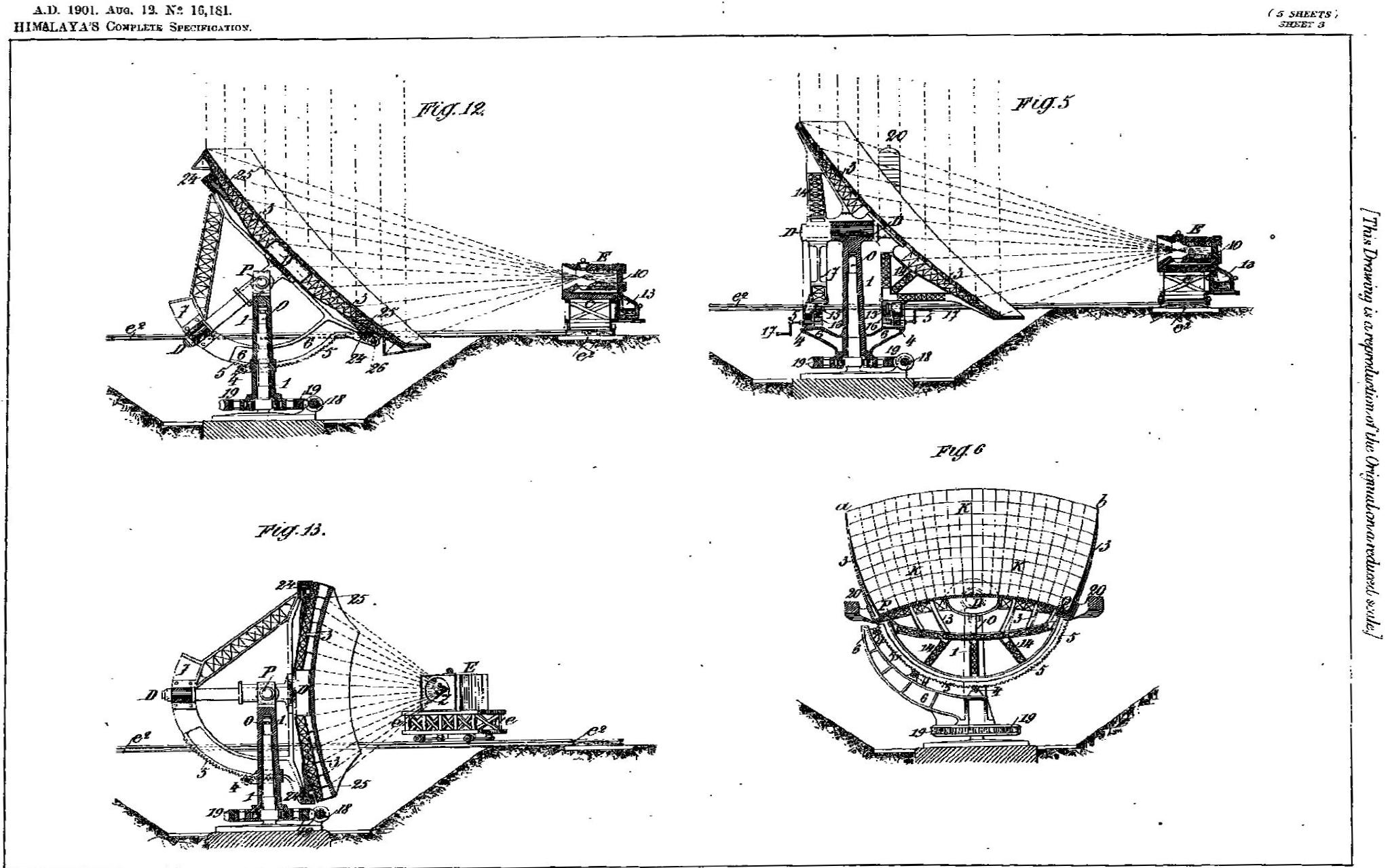

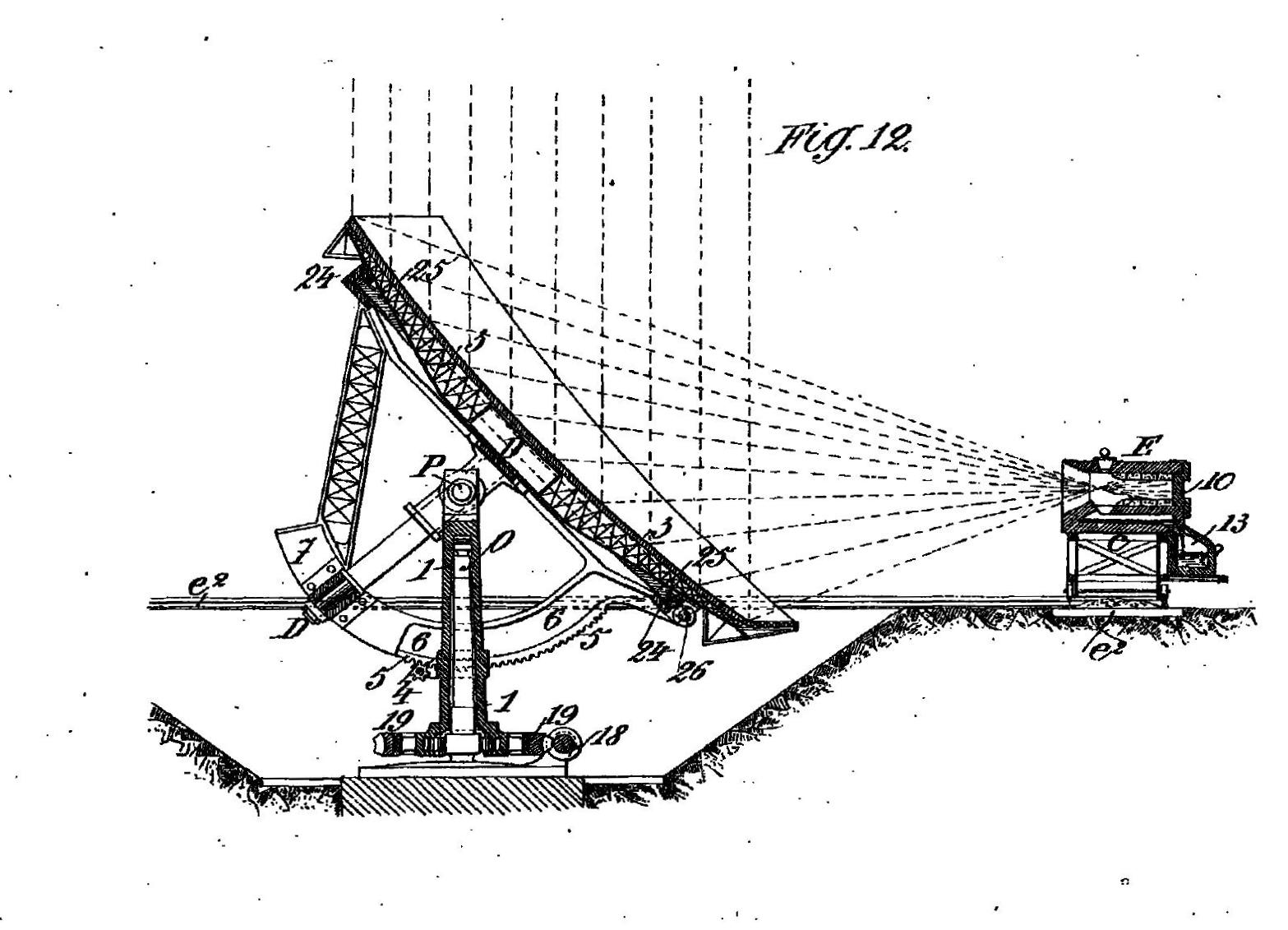

== See also ==
- Burning glass
