= Via Verde =

Toll collection system used in Portugal

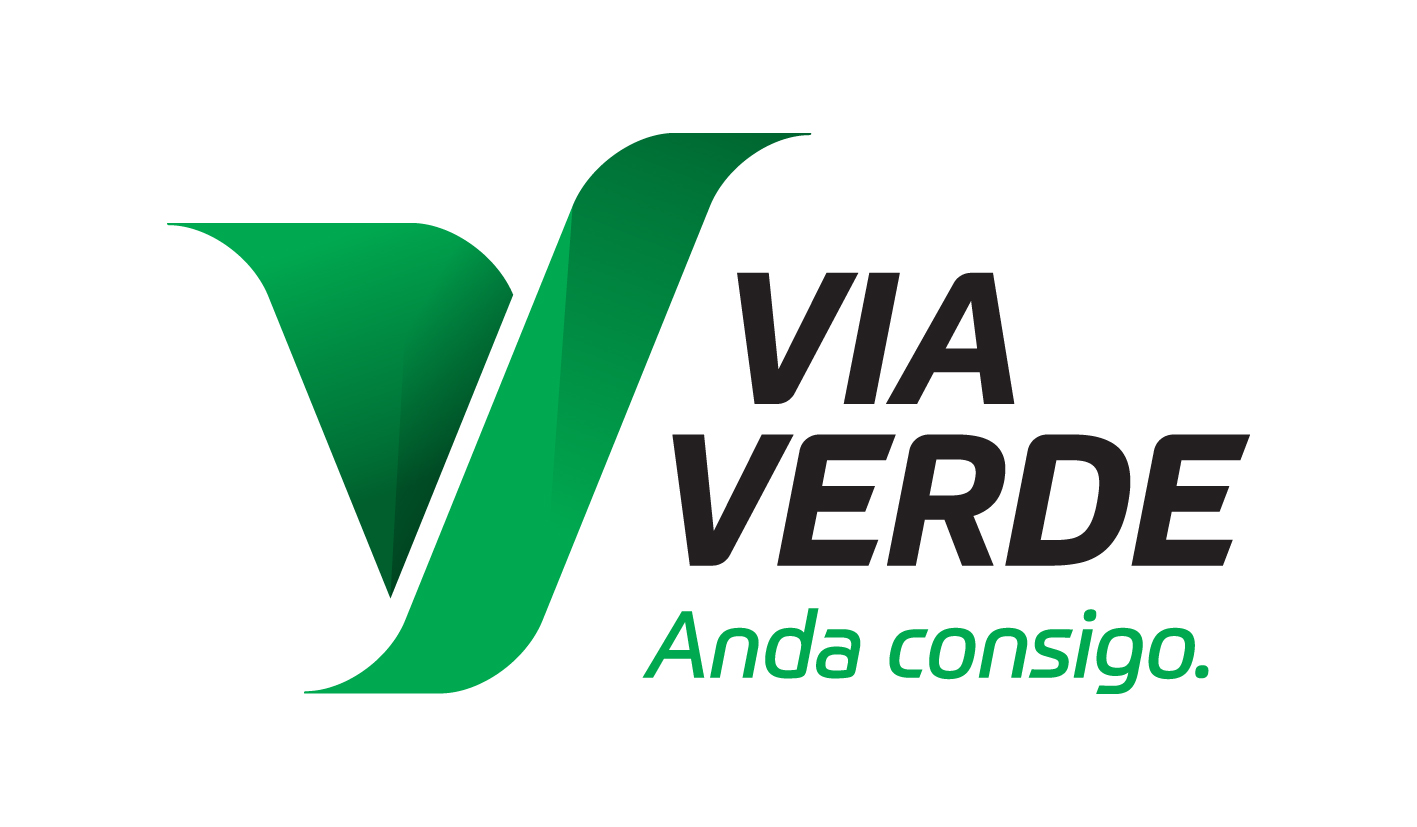
- Founded: 1991; 35 years ago
- Area served: Portugal

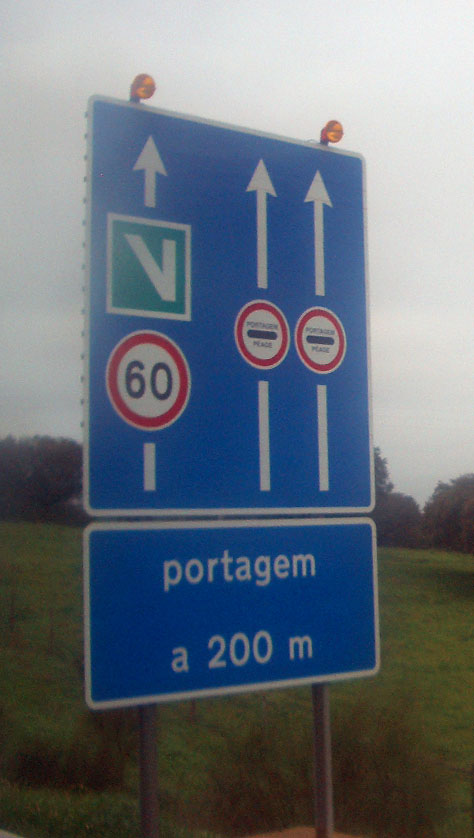
Freeway lane sign in the Portuguese A6 freeway/motorway (Marateca-Caia). The leftmost lane is for exclusive use by vehicles equipped with Via Verde tags.

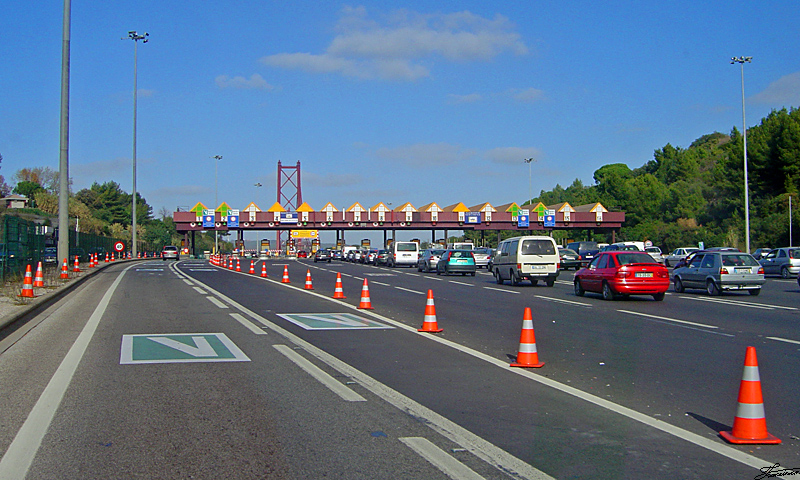
Via Verde lanes in the 25 April Bridge toll plaza, Almada.

Via Verde (literally "Green Lane") is an electronic toll collection system used in Portugal since April 1991. It is available at all toll roads and bridges in the country since 1995. Toll roads and bridges are operated by multiple operators, the main being Brisa - Auto-estradas de Portugal.

Upon passing in a non-stop lane at a toll, a DSRC tag attached to the vehicle's windshield transmits its identifier and the toll amount is debited directly from the client's bank account. If an exception is detected (the tag is invalid (or non-existent) or the vehicle's class (as detected by the lane sensors) does not correspond to the class encoded in the tag, amongst others) the vehicle is photographed and, if there is indication of fraud, a legal procedure is initiated.

This system provides for a good flow of traffic: usually the non-stop lanes on interchanges have a 40 or 60 km/h speed limit, tolls on the highway (as in between different tolling regions) have a 120 km/h speed limit, and the system has been proven to work at speeds above 200 km/h.

The Via Verde system was the first to be universally applied to all the tolls in a country. Via Verde has gained widespread use in Portugal mainly because it can operate with any bank in the country, as there is a fully integrated cross-bank network (the SIBS network, also known as Multibanco).

== Vehicle classes ==
Via Verde/toll works with classes for the various vehicles (see Brisa classes for details).

- Class 1: vehicles with a height that are below 1.10m(*), with or without trailer
  - Motorcycles are considered class 1 in case of manual toll collection or class 5 when using Via Verde.
- Class 2: vehicles with two axles and a height equal or above 1.10 m(*).
- Class 3: vehicles with three axles and a height equal or above 1.10 m(*).
- Class 4: vehicles with more than three axles and a height equal or above 1.10 m(*).

Some Class 2 cars are eligible for a class reduction if they are between 1100mm and 1300mm(*) tall, maximum weight is between 2300 kg and 3500 kg, can carry more than 5 passengers, and does not have 4-wheel drive. This is determined either by finding the vehicle on a pre-approved list, or by getting a special inspection.

(*) Measured over the front axle (Classes de Veículos).

== Alternate uses ==
Due to the widespread use of the Via Verde, it is now being expanded to other areas outside toll fee collecting. Many carparks, some gas service stations (GALP) and even McDrive (equivalent to DriveThru) are now using it as a possible payment method. This system is fully integrated, which means one tag works everywhere. As of 2015, one McDonald's location in Lisbon accepted Via Verde as a method of payment. Via Verde is also commonly accepted in parking centres, most notably in Lisbon Airport.

== Electronic toll ==
Since 2010, some highways have used a system of electronic tolling – no manual cash or credit card payment is possible anymore. These highways can be recognized by an icon showing a car driving under some curved lines and a Euro symbol.
