= ColorADD =

System of graphical symbols for colors

Example ColorADD symbols for seven colors

ColorADD is a sign code for aiding color blind people to recognize colors, developed by Portuguese graphic designer and a professor at the University of Minho, Miguel Neiva. It consists of geometric shapes representing colors and color combinations. The app won the accessibility category of the 2013 Vodafone Foundation Mobile For Good Europe Awards.

== Code ==
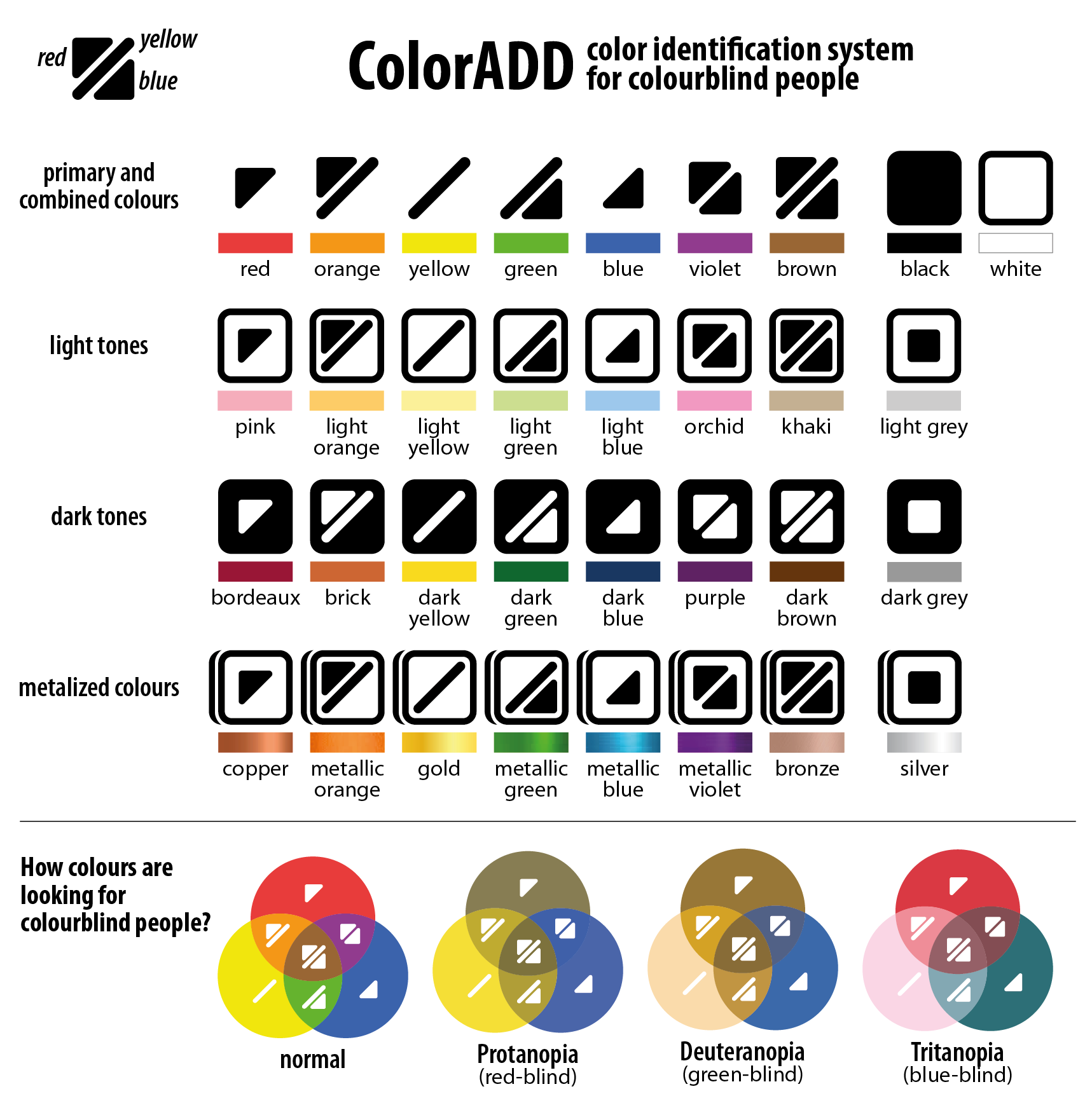
The code signs and color combinations

The code is based on five base signs: two triangles (one angled upwards and the other angled downwards), one diagonal line, one solid square box and one empty square box representing black, white and the primary colors of the RYB color model: red, blue, and yellow. Colors derived from other colors have the symbols of the combined colors, creating derivative colors (orange, green, purple and brown) and dark or white tones. Metalized colors like silver or gold are shown with a left parenthesis on the symbols.

== Uses and recognitions ==
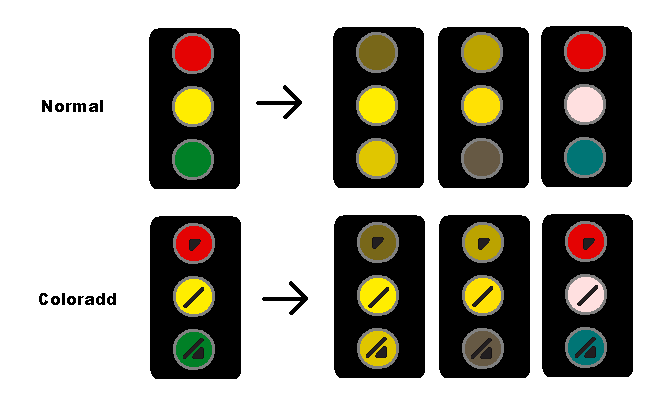
Application of coloradd code in traffic lights with color blindness

Since its creation, ColorADD has been applied in various services, mainly in Portugal:

- Hospitals: on patient wristbands, pill bottles and path lines
- Schools: Viarco coloring pencils and students' note books
- Transports: subway maps, traffic lights and parking lots
- Accessibility: paint cans, groceries, postage services, energy monitoring

It was also recognised by Buenos Aires University and TEDx Porto.

In September 2017, Mattel launched a colorblind-friendly version of Uno that utilizes ColorADD.

== Fees and usage restrictions ==
This system is copyrighted; it is not in the public domain, nor is it free licensed. Usage must be licensed by the for-profit private company Miguel Neiva & Associados - design gráfico, Lda. and fees are not public. According to ColorADD "license fee is adjusted to the partner's profile". There is a pro bono model only for schools and universities managed by the nonprofit NGO ColorADD.Social.

== Criticism ==
=== Orientation dependency ===
One of the main criticisms of the ColorADD system is that some of the color symbols can be confused if they are inverted, similar to how the Arabic numerals 6 and 9 are mirror images of each other. For example, the symbols for red and blue both use the same triangle oriented in a different direction, and the symbols for green and orange are mirror images of each other.

In some uses, this problem has been addressed by adding a baseline to indicate the bottom of the symbol, in a similar manner to how the six and nine Arabic numerals can be clarified. This adds noise to the design and can slow down the identification of some ColorADD symbols. While Arabic numerals came into existence centuries ago, the much more recent ColorADD system could have been designed with this in mind.

=== Colors used as codes ===
In many cases, colors are used as a code for something else. In these cases, the choice of color is often arbitrary. The use of color symbols can add an unnecessary layer of indirection and other more direct symbols are better choices.

For instance, the colors assigned to lines on a transport map are arbitrary. As well as a color, they are often assigned a letter or number. Instead of repeating the ColorADD symbols, it would be preferable to repeat the letter or number throughout the map or to choose a colorblind-friendly palette. Another example is the color coding of [waste sorting] bins. In this instance, symbols representing what can be put in each bin would be more useful.

== Similar systems ==
The Feelipa Color Code is another colour-identification system developed in Portugal for accessibility purposes. Both systems use simple geometric symbols to represent colours and colour relationships, although they differ in their visual languages, design methodologies, and implementations.

== See also ==
- Secondary notation
- Hatching (heraldry)
