= Carracks black sword =

Swords used by Portuguese sailors and seamen during the Age of Discovery

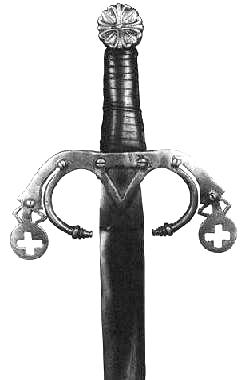
Carracks black sword.

The Carracks black sword, sometimes called a crab sword, is a type of sword invented in Portugal, during the 15th century. It was used by Portuguese and Spanish soldiers and sailors in ships and caravels in the Age of Discovery.

== Names ==
- Espada preta de bordo ("naval black sword")
- Espada carangueja or espada de caranguejo ("crab sword")

== Characteristics ==
It is characterized by having a guard with two protective rings, with the guard terminals in the form of two flat drops pointing toward the tip of the blade, and forming large round plates sharpened sufficiently to be used as extra blades convenient in close combat. The protective rings, in addition to their function to guard the fingers, can also serve to trap an opponent's blade.

These swords were painted black to prevent reflected light from betraying their presence on ships, as well as to mitigate corrosion caused by salt water.

== History ==
This type of sword would have appeared between 1460 and 1480 in Portugal, Spain and Italy, culturally related lands. It saw much of its use in Portuguese trading cities in Africa, coming to be used as a symbol of honor by the local chiefs.

== See also ==
- Rapier
- Bollock dagger
