= Multibanco =

Portuguese interbank network

- Operating area: Portugal
- Members: 27
- ATMs: 11,440
- Founded: 1985; 41 years ago
- Owner: Sociedade Interbancária de Serviços S.A.

Multibanco is a Portuguese interbank network. It is the largest interbank network in Portugal owned and operated by SIBS (Sociedade Interbancária de Serviços S.A.), that links the ATMs of 27 banks in Portugal, totaling 12,700 machines as of December 2014. The bank members of Multibanco control the SIBS. Multibanco is a fully integrated interbank network. One of the most notable characteristics of Multibanco is the wide range of services that can be utilised through its machines.

Multibanco in itself does not only encompass ATMs. It has a fully-fledged EFTPOS network called Multibanco Automatic Payment, and is also a provider of mobile phone and Internet banking services through the TeleMultibanco and MBNet services respectively. It is also the provider of the Via Verde automated toll payment service.

== History ==
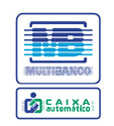
Multibanco's old logo (1985–2008).

The Caixa Automático Multibanco (Multibanco ATM) was the first project developed by SIBS, founded in 1983, and started operating on September 2, 1985, with the installation of 12 terminals in the cities of Lisbon and Porto.

In 1995, the network had 3,745 ATMs; in 2006 had more than 11,200; and as of December 2014 it had 12,700, on which an average of more than 75 million operations are made every month.

== Functionality ==
Multibanco is known for having more functionality than standard ATMs in other countries. Initially, the machines only offered withdrawal of cash, checking of balances and checking of recent transactions. Later, features such as service and shopping payments, Prepaid mobile phone top-up and show ticket sales, among others, were introduced. Nowadays, 60 different services are offered by the Multibanco network.

== Usage ==
From 2001 to 2005, the average number of transactions by year is over 630 million. The number has been rising every year; 719 million were recorded in 2005. This has since grown substantially, with 900 million operations recorded in 2014.

| Year | Number of ATMs | Total number of transactions |
|---|---|---|
| 2001 | 8,482 | 527,417,947 |
| 2002 | 9,032 | 588,806,749 |
| 2003 | 9,521 | 631,912,059 |
| 2004 | 10,085 | 683,764,445 |
| 2005 | 10,723 | 719,006,591 |
| 2014 | 12,700 | 900,000,000 |

== Security ==
Multibanco allows users with a local (Portuguese) bank account to withdraw a maximum of 400 Euros daily (holders of foreign accounts can withdraw more, depending on their bank). If the user fails to enter the correct PIN after three attempts, the ATM will not return the card. If the user fails to take the money out of the ATM after a certain period of time, the ATM takes back the cash to prevent theft. A recent security measure has been introduced under the form of a tinting mechanism that releases ink and stains the money in the event of forced opening of the ATM. When in possession of a tinted bill, one must report it to the police (for further investigation, as it is likely to be from a stolen ATM) and can later have it traded at a bank for a non-tinted one, without additional charges. In addition to security cameras, many ATM terminals include a rear-view mirror above the interactive screen, and the money withdrawal slot is located at approximately waist-level, for quick and more secluded storage of the money.

== Payment options ==
=== Point of sale ===
The Multibanco Automatic Payment is an EFTPOS network which began operating in 1987. It allows electronic payments made at the point of sale, through the use of a system accepted card. Therefore, this service allows real time payments protected with security measures, with 266,000 such terminals on the network as of 2014. In 2014, 781 million payments were made using this system.

=== Telephone ===
MB WAY was launched as TeleMultibanco in 1996, rebranded to "MB Phone" in 2008, then to its current branding in 2014. It allows its users to check their account balance and transactions, make transfers, service and shopping payments through their mobile phones. In 2009, around 3 million transactions were made by the 300,000 mobile phone clients using this system.

=== Internet ===
MB NET allows users to make payments through the Internet and it is set up for online shopping. Over 1 million payments were made using MB NET in 2009. MB NET allows the creation of virtual credit cards to be used online. Depending on the card system, one will get an American Express, Visa or Mastercard virtual card. For example, if the card is a Visa or Visa Electron then the generated cards by MB NET are Visa scheme. This system is compatible with most payment systems, including PayPal and all places that accept credit cards as payment.

To generate a virtual credit card one must login to the MB NET site and enter a limit. Then the site instantly gives the credit card number and security codes (CVC2 and CVV2) to pay for your online purchase. The number is also valid for offline purchases. The virtual cards allow for normal credit card interactions; either payment or crediting the holder's account. There are two types of virtual card—one for one-time use, and one meant for multiple uses.

All cards are given a usable lifetime of between 1 and 12 months. More specifically, they are valid until the end of the month following the one when it is requested/issued. The great advantage of MB NET is that the customer's real payment details are never known to the vendor and the card's limit can be set according to the purchase's value. Even if a vendor or a hacker tries to extort a higher amount, the defined limit prevents it. Shopping online is hence made safer.

Registration to use MB NET is required. To do so, one must go to a Multibanco ATM or one's home banking website (if the bank allows that operation on such a medium). The client sets a password but the username is given by the system. Registration links the MB NET service to a debit or credit card of one of the SIBS associated banking institutions that support it.

=== Mobile ===
MB Way logo.

MB Way is an application available for Android, iOS, Windows, Windows Phone and Tizen devices. Currently, the MB Way application allows making instant money transfers between mobile phone numbers associated with MB Way, generate MB Net virtual cards for online purchases, pay for purchases in physical stores using a mobile phone number, QR code and contactless, and use an ATM machines without having to use a bank card.

=== Automated teller machine ===
The automated toll payment service Via Verde is also operated by SIBS. "Host to host" is the name given to the system that allows users to perform ATM transactions through their own bank site, enabling online banking which has been active since 2000.

== See also ==
- Euro Alliance of Payment Schemes
