= Irene Below =

German art historian

Irene Below (born 1942) is a German woman art historian.

== Life ==
Below studied in Munich, Cologne and Berlin. From 1964 to 1967 she was a German Academic Exchange Service scholarship holder for Florence and was awarded a doctorate in 1971 with a dissertation on Leonardo da Vinci and Filippino Lippi. As early as 1972, at a congress of the Association of German Art Historians in Constance, Below suggested that the question of women in art history should be considered and thus initiated a discussion on the feminist perspective in art history. From 1974 to 2004, Below taught at the Bielefeld University, since 2007 as a lecturer at the University of Bielefeld in the Department of Art and Music. This is accompanied by freelance work as a curator and journalist. From 1995 until 1999, she undertook research trips to South Africa. In 2000, she was a founding member of frauenkunstforum-owl e. V. and 1987-1994 a spokesperson for the women's studies section in art studies in the Ulmer Verein - Verband für Kunst- und Kulturwissenschaften. Since 1988, she has been the initiator of the Women's Forum in the BDK Fachverband für Kunstpädagogik.

In 1998, Below became involved against the name Richard Kaselowsky for the Kunsthalle Bielefeld, which is why the then director Thomas Kellein turned to the school board for support against this "teacher gone wild".

She was and is involved in many socio-political activities; in the 1980s she was co-founder of a self-managed day-care centre with alternative pedagogy, and in 2017 of the self-help initiative "Wir für uns-anders Altern".

Below is married and has two sons. She lives in Werther near Bielefeld in North Rhine-Westphalia.

== Main areas of work ==
Her work focuses on the settlement of architecture of the 1920s, feminist art and cultural studies, female artists of the 20th and 21st centuries, periphery and centre in art, the art world and science, and studies on the exile of artists and scientists.

== Publications ==
- Die schönen Zeiten sind vorbei. Die schönen Zeiten hat es nie gegeben. Politische Kultur von unten in einer Reforminstitution – Irene Below (author), Peter Fuchs (writer), Frankfurt, 1986 ISBN 3-88704-044-9
- Es gab nicht nur das Bauhaus: Below (writer) Bauhaus Dessau Foundation, 1994 ISBN 3-936796-20-3
- Gisela Wölbing/Gertrud van Dyck: Historische Museen: Schriften der Historischen Museen der Stadt Bielefeld 8. Irene Below, Jörg Boström, Jutta Hülsewieg-Johnen, Gottfried Jäger, Rosa Schumacher, Sybille Seiger. Westfalen Verlag, 1996 ISBN 3-88918-088-4
- Irma Stern and the Expressionism. Afrika und Europa. Irene Below (writer), Jutta Hülsewig-Johnen (writer) Christof Kerber Verlag, 1998 ISBN 3-924639-73-6
- Hidden treasures, Irma Stern, Irene Below: Society of Bibliophiles in Cape Town, 2000 ISBN 0-620-26727-5
- Die Vorteile des Künstlerinnendaseins: Susanne Albrecht (author), Irene Below (author), Angela Kahre (author) Interdisziplinäres Zentrum für Frauen- und Geschlechterforschung (IFF), 2001 ISBN 3-932869-10-9
- eins und doppelt: Irene Below (foreword), Joachim Bünemann (foreword), Stefanie Lux-Althoff (collaboration) Landesverband Lippe, 2001 ISBN 3-9807375-2-7
- Christel Linkerhägner: Irene Below (publisher), Christa Niestrath (publisher), Tanja Kämmer (foreword), Christel Linkerhägner (Fotografin) frauenkunstforum-owl, 2004 ISBN 3-9809866-0-8
- Feministische Interventionen: Die Ausstellung Frauenalltag und Frauenbewegung 1890–1980 in Historischen Museum Frankfurt. In Annegret Friedrich (ed.): Die Freiheit der Anderen. Festschrift for Viktoria Schmidt-Linsenhoff. Marburg 2004, pp. 67–81.
- Kulturelle Hierarchien in der Kunst (pädagogik)? In Johannes Kirschenmann, Rainer Wenrich, Wolfgang Zacharias (ed.): Kunstpädagogisches Generationengespräch. Zukunft braucht Soziale Herkunft. Munich 2004, pp. 290–293.
- Below with Susanne Albrecht: Marmor, Stein und andere Stoffe–eine gelungene Kooperation und deren Voraussetzungen. Shortcut in Soft Logics in der Kunstvermittlung, Künstlerhaus Stuttgart, 2004
- Irene Below with Beatrice von Bismarck: Globalisierung /Hierarchisierung: Kulturelle Dominanzen in Kunst und Kunstgeschichte, 2004, ISBN 978-3-89445-339-8
- Globalization/Hierarchy. Irene Below (writer), Beatrice von Bismarck (writer). Jonas Verlag, 2004 ISBN 3-89445-339-7
- With Ayşe and Ariane im Hamam – Zeitgenössische Kunst und interkulturelles Lernen in der Kunstpädagogik. In: Welt-Kunst-Pädagogik. Kunstvermittlung zwischen westlichen Kunst-Konzepten und globalen Fragestellungen. Loccumer Protokolle, Loccum 2005
- Gegen die Norm. Susanne Lüftners künstlerische Strategien. In Susanne Lüftner. Werkschau 1978–2004, Dortmund 2005, pp. 2–11.
- Below with Melanie Blank: Helene Homilius (* 1910)–eine fast vergessene Künstlerin aus Hörste/Halle i. Westf. In: Heimat-Jahrbuch Kreis Gütersloh, Gütersloh 2005, pp. 169–173.
- Susanne Lüftner: Werkschau 1973–2004 Silvia Liebig (designer), Michael Odenwaller (Designer), Susanne Lüftner (illustrator), Evan von der Dunk (translator), Irene Below (writer), Gabriele Oberreuter (writer). Kunst-Praxis Soest, 2005 ISBN 3-00-017262-9
- Jene widersinnige Leichtigkeit der Innovation Hanna Deinhard's Wissenschaftskritik, Kunstsoziologie und Kunstvermittlung. In Ursula Hudson–Wiedenmann, Beate Schmeichel-Falkenberg (ed.): Grenzen Überschreiten. Frauen, Kunst und Exil, Würzburg 2005. pp. 151–179. And in kunststoff–Zeitschrift für Kunst und Wissenschaft 3/2005
- Zwischen den Kulturen. Umgababa – Irma Sterns erstes Reisebuch. In Theresa Georgen, Carola Muysers: Bühnen des Selbst. Zur Autobiographie in den Künsten des 20. und 21. Jahrhunderts. Reihe Gestalt und Diskurs, Muthesius Kunsthochschule in Kiel 2006, pp. 221–244.
- Lucy von Jacobi – Journalistin. Konzeption und Redaktion: Rolf Aurich, Wolfgang Jacobsen, Irene Below, Ruth Oelze. Film & Schrift, vol. 9, edition text & kritik, Munich 2009. ISBN 978-3-86916-003-0
- Below: Behinderte Karrieren im Umbruch der Zeit: Benita Koch-Otte (1892–1976). In Inge Hansen-Schaberg, Wolfgang Thöner and Adriane Feustel (ed.): Entfernt: Frauen des Bauhauses während der NS-Zeit–Verfolgung und Exil. edition text + kritik, Automn 2012
- Friedrich Meschede, Jutta Huelsewig-Johnen, with texts among others by Irene Below: 'To open eyes: Kunst und Textil vom Bauhaus bis heute', 2013, ISBN 978-3-86678-919-7
- Below, Inge Hansen-Schaberg, Maria Kublitz-Kramer (ed.): Das Ende des Exils?: Briefe von Frauen nach 1945 (Frauen und Exil), 2014, ISBN 978-3-86916-373-4
- Below, Burcu Dogramaci (ed.): Kunst und Gesellschaft zwischen den Kulturen: Die Kunsthistorikerin Hanna Levy-Deinhard im Exil und ihre Aktualität heute (Frauen und Exil), 2016, ISBN 978-3-86916-491-5
