= Luís Raposo =

Portuguese archeologist and writer

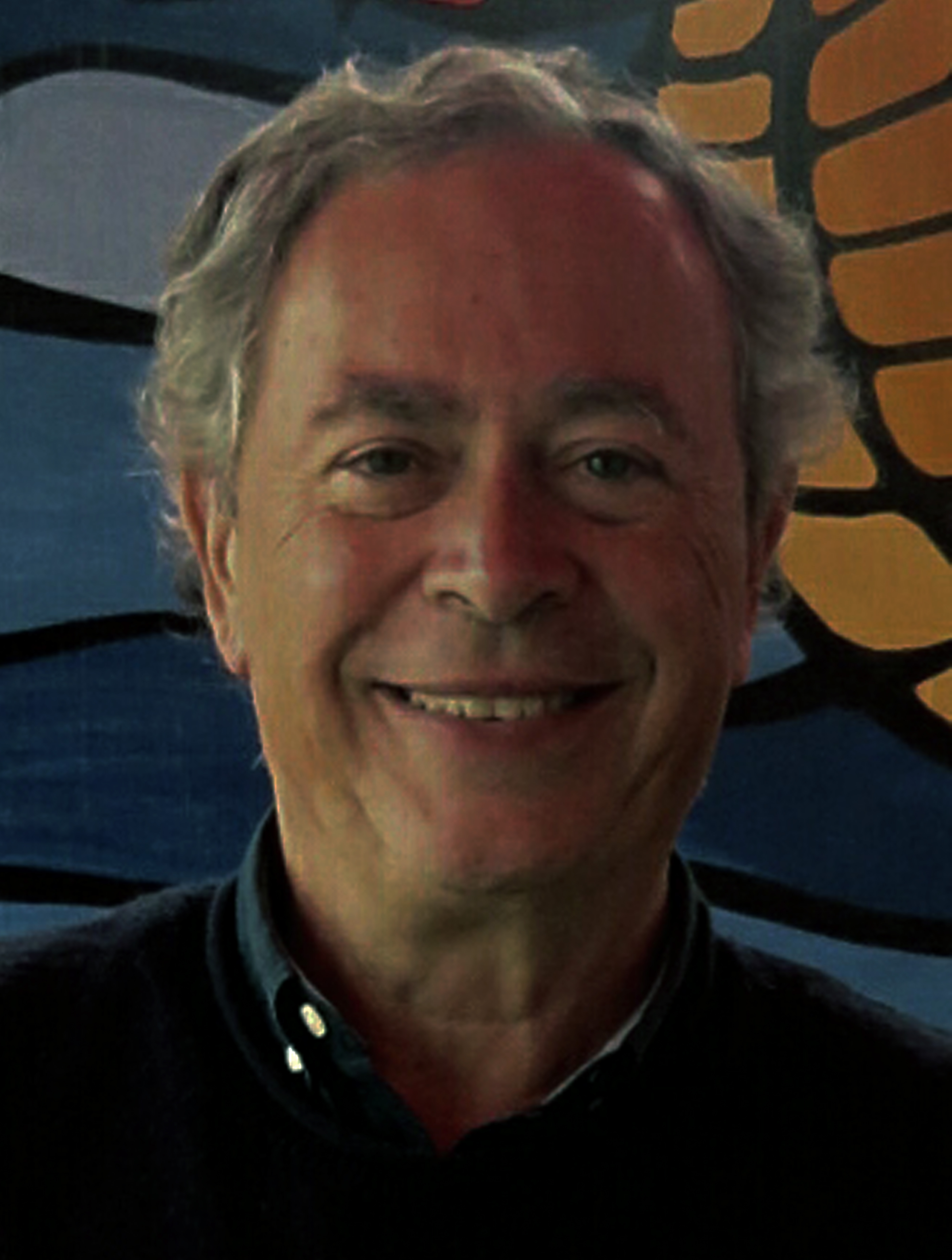
- Raposo in 2017
- Born: 21 February 1955 (age 71); Lisbon, Portugal
- Education: University of Lisbon
- Occupations: Archaeologist; writer; museum professional
- Employer(s): National Archaeology Museum; ICOM Europe
- Known for: President of ICOM Europe; Director of the National Archaeology Museum (1996–2012)

Luís Raposo (born 21 February 1955 in Lisbon) is a Portuguese archeologist and writer. He has published about two and a half hundred work up to the present. He is the President of ICOM Europe.

== Qualifications and training ==
Graduated in History from the Faculty of Arts, University of Lisbon (1977), archaeologist since 1980, he became a specialist in Paleolithic Prehistory. He was director of the National Archaeology Museum, in Lisbon, between 1996 and 2012. He received a scholarship from the Calouste Gulbenkian Foundation as a participant in several scientific meetings and research work complementary to his doctorate, from 1 January 1994 to 30 October 1995.

In 2013, he participated by International Council of Museums (ICOM) in the Triennial Conference held in Rio de Janeiro

== Professional performance ==
He was chairman of the board of directors of the Professional Association of Archaeologists of Portugal in 1998–2000. He remained there as a member of the Board of the General Assembly, in 2000–2010 and as chairman of the supervisory board, between 2010 and 2012. He was visiting scholar at the Faculty of Arts of the University of Lisbon between 2005 and 2014. As the member of the advisory board of the Portuguese National Commission of UNESCO, he has been involved in the establishment of local and regional archaeological museums in his country.

== Deontology ==
Luís Raposo thinks that the role of museums consists in defending national interest for the benefit of all citizens. As a democrat, he fights for the existence of a State that ensures justice, fair redistribution of wealth among people, public investment in education and culture, in short, a practice that implements advanced social policies in welfare state. According to him, "this can only be done with social engagement" and considers that the associated movement is one of the best forms of its expression, in particular in the fields of specialty. He basically follows, as "essential misson", the Code of Ethics for Museums.

== European Mission ==
As a critic of the cultural policies of prime ministers José Sócrates and Passos Coelho, Luís Raposo was fired by Coelho, in 2012, from the management of the National Archaeological Museum. As a result, he leaps forward and runs for the leadership of ICOM (International Council of Museums). Founded in 1946, ICOM is a non-governmental organization which "maintains formal relations with the United Nations Educational, Scientific and Cultural Organization (UNESCO) and has consultative status with the Economic and Social Council of United Nations". Thus, Luís Raposo "will lead the largest international museum organization, after winning the vote for the coordinator of the network of museums in France".

His election was largely majoritarian: 15 votes against 5 of his rival from ICOM-France, Bernard Blache, someone who excels in audiences. And so Luís Raposo becomes the coordinator of the 'French network of museums' and the center for the development of scientific, technical and cultural culture.

Being elected for a second term as President of ICOM-Europe, Raposo thanks ICOM Portugal for having proposed him as candidate and underlines that there was "almost unanimity": 15 national committees in Europe voted for him and only one voted blank. The vote took place as part of the parallel activities of the ICOM Triennial World Conference, which took place in Milan, Italy.

ICOM, the largest international organization of museums and museum professionals, is concerned with the preservation and dissemination of the world's natural and cultural heritage, "the present and the future, tangible and intangible", as read on its website. Currently, ICOM is made up of 119 national commissions, 30 specialized commissions and five regional commissions, including ICOM Europe

== Awards ==
- Honorable mention by the 'National Environmental Prize' instituted by the 'Portuguese Confederation of Environmental Defense Associations' (CPADA), 2010
- Honorary title Amicus Romaniae, awarded by the Romanian Cultural Center in Portugal, 25 February 2010

== Other merits ==
in Portuguese

- Alerts against the risks that threaten the archaeological heritage of Portugal, such as the Prehistoric Rock Art Sites in the Côa Valley.
- Co-author of the book entitled Um modelo sintagmático e transformacional do português contemporâneo (A syntagmatic and transformational model of contemporary Portuguese, Didáctica Editora edition, Lisbon, 1982.
- Author of the study / experiment "A certain way of celebrating Fernão Lopes", in "Escola Democrática" (magazine of the Direção Geral da Educação de Base), nº 33–34, pp. 21–25, Lisbon, 1980.

in English

- Neanderthals on the Edge – 150th Anniversary Conference of the Forbes' Quarry Discovery, Gibraltar
- Author of the study "The Middle-Upper Palaeolithic Transition in Portugal", at "Neanderthals on the edge: 150th anniversary conference of the Forbes' Quarry discovery, Gibraltar", pp. 95–109, Oxbow Books: Oxford.
- Co-editor (with N. Moloney e M. Santonja) of the volume "Non-flint stone tools and the Palaeolithic Occupation of the Iberian Peninsula", B.A.R. – International Series, number 649, ed. Tempus Reperatum, Oxford
- Co-editor of the compendium " On Community and Sustainable Museums / Museos Comunitarios y Sostenibles ", ed. EULAC Museums, 2019

== See also ==
- Collective memory
- Human sciences
- Anthropology
- Anthropology of art
- Ethics for Museums (See TEXT)
- International Museum Day
