= Freiesleben =

Noble Saxon family name

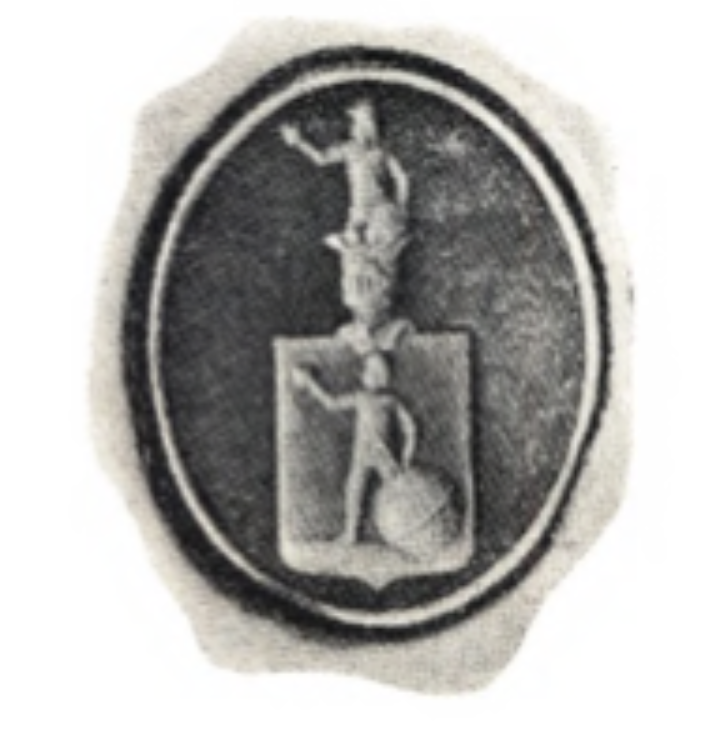
Escutcheon of Freiesleben

The House of Freiesleben is the name of an old and distinguished German noble family with Bohemian roots. Members of the family are still alive, notably in Germany and Denmark. The family originated from Saxony, Germany and are descendants of one of the three brothers Christoph, Leonhard, and Aegyd de Freysleben from Bohemia, who were granted a coat of arms by Charles V in 1544. The family's original name was the Old Saxon Freslewen, Frislewen – "a free-living (man)".

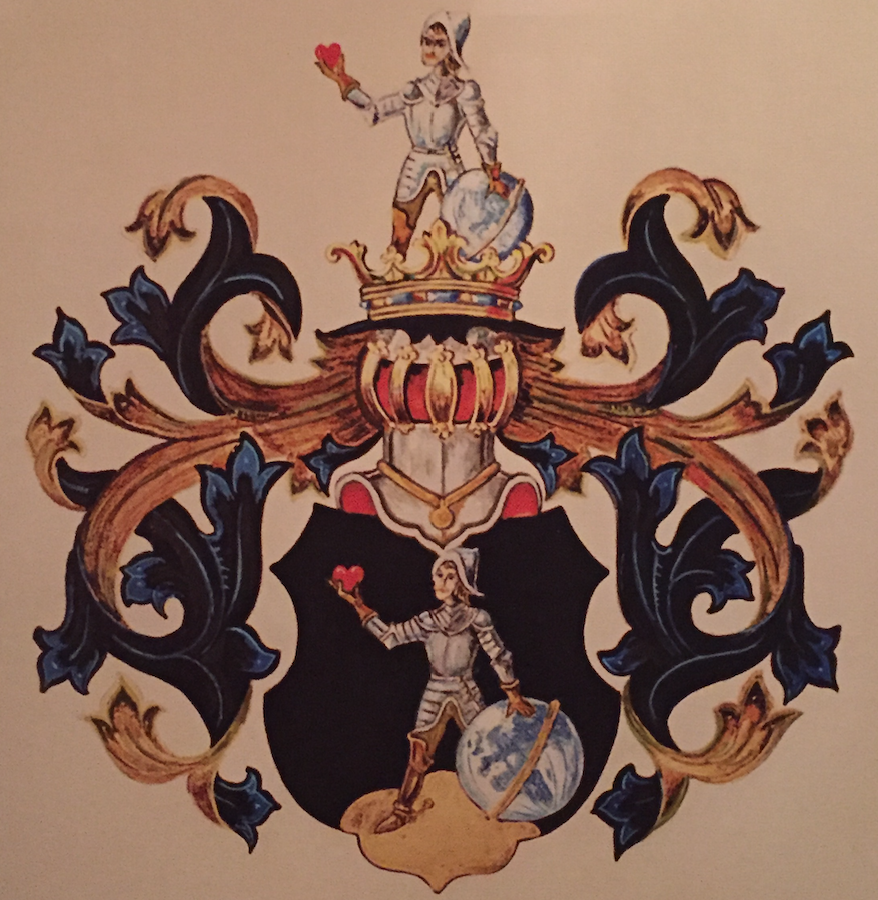
Coat of arms of the Freiesleben family

Notable persons with the surname include:

- Bertrand Freiesleben (born 1967), German artist.
- Birgitte Freiesleben de Blasio (born 1968), Epidemiologist and biostatistician
- Johann Karl Freiesleben (1774–1846), German mineralogist. The mineral Freieslebenite is named after him.

== See also ==
- Freisleben

== Sources ==
- Hauch-Fausbøll, T (1933) Haandbog over den ikke naturaliserede Adel. Copenhagen, DK: Dansk Genealogisk Instituts Forlag.
- Hauch-Fausbøll, T (1900) Slægthaandbogen: Tillæg til Personalhistoriske Samlinger. Copenhagen, DK: Dansk Genealogisk Instituts Forlag.
- Nieuwenhuis, P. N. (1887/1905) Theodor Freiesleben in: Bricka, C. F. (ed.) Dansk Biografisk Lexikon. Copenhagen, DK: Gyldendal.
- Dana, J. D. & Dana, E. S. & Palache, C. & Berman, H. & Frondel, C. (1944) Dana's System of Mineralogy, Vol. I: Elements, Sulfides, Sulfosalts, Oxides (7th Edition). Hoboken, NJ: Wiley.
- Dansk Biografisk Leksikon
