= Jesús de Miguel (artist) =

Spanish painter (born 1975)

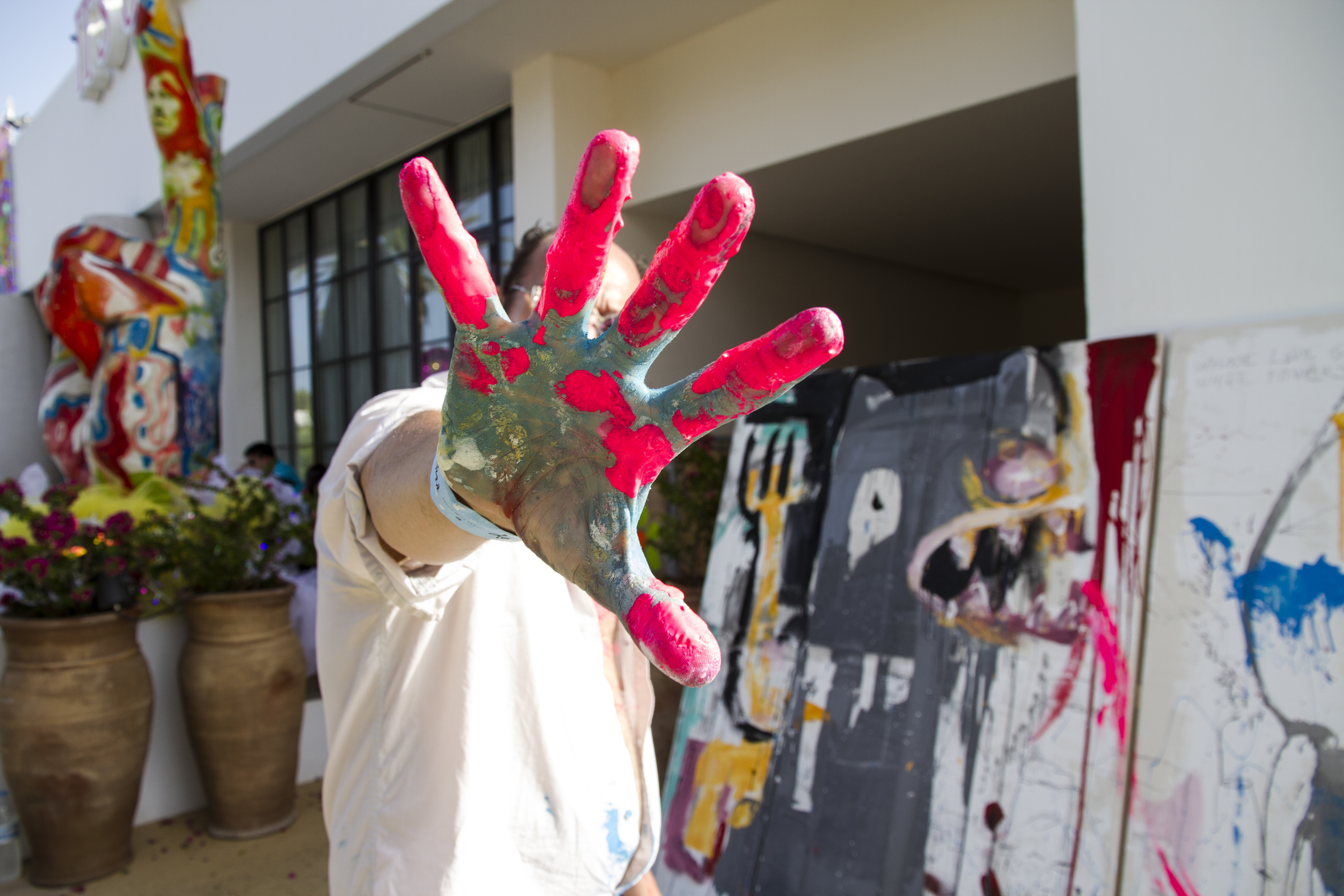
- Jesus de Miguel at "Flower Power Beat Experience Festival"
- Born: 9 January 1975; Palencia, Spain
- Education: University of Salamanca, Salamanca, Spain
- Known for: Painting, drawing, music, video art, sculpture
- Style: Abstraction, figuration
- Movement: Neo-expressionism

Jesús de Miguel (Spanish: [xeˈsus ðe miˈɣel]; born 9 January 1975) is a Spanish neo expressionist artist.

== Biography ==
He graduated in fine art at the University of Salamanca in 1999 after having studied also anthropology of art there. He has been Art Director of Flower Power since 2000. Flower Power is the artistic and musical initiative that has been held in Pachá for more than 30 years.

In 2000 he released his own label, Modern Electrics, with his partner Al Velilla. They have boosted the work of electronic music artists such as Nacho Marco, Jay Tripwire and Kiko Navarro.

Its many facets range from sculpture, to musical creation, 3D animation, video art, and installation art, with styles taken from dadaism, comics, punk, collage and even prehistoric paintings. British artist Allen Jones attended de Miguel's exhibition at Think Creative Hub, and described him as "an artist who uses different pictorial expressions in an exceptional way" and that "it is very difficult to make such a large individual exhibition and, at the same time, to be so homogeneous and complete."

== Solo shows ==
- 2000 – Rockymarcianoseretira in the Istituto Europeo di Design
- 2002 – Grial, Ibiza.
- 2005 – Psycolabis Pachá Hotel, Ibiza.
- 2006 – Silly short films. Video sample. La Nave, Ibiza
- 2007–2009 – Artistic direction and video installations in Home Video Festival Ibiza, HOVI
- 2007–2010 – Miguel E. Young Art Gallery. Ibiza
- 2010–2011 – Club Roca Llisa, Ibiza
- 2011 – Exhibitions Hall at Can Jeroni, Ibiza.
- 2013 – Storm and Tide, Madrid
- 2014 – Pictures & MAD furniture at La Maison, Ibiza
- 2015 – Think Creative Hub, Ibiza
- 2015 – Universal White Glue Club Diario de Ibiza, Ibiza
- 2016 – Art exhibition in Casa Portmany. Dalt Vila, Ibiza
- 2017 – Es polvorí. Dalt Vila, Ibiza.
- 2017 – Continuous unnecessary information B12 Gallery, Ibiza.
- 2018 – Solo show at SushiPoint, Ibiza
- 2018 – Qué pinto aquí. Individual Exhibition. Velázquez, 12, Madrid

== Living art ==
- 2 July 2017: Creating some paintings by "four hands" with artist Robert Arató.
- 13 July 2017: Tribute to the Beat Generation in the 'Flower Power Beat Experience Festival', with the collaboration of the French artist Silvio Magaglio.
