= Inge Hansen-Schaberg =

German woman educator (born 1954)

- Born: March 11, 1954 (age 72); Flensburg, West Germany
- Employer: TU Berlin
- Known for: Research on Women in Exile and Reform Pedagogy
- Title: Extraordinary Professor

Academic background
- Education: TU Berlin; University of Potsdam

Academic work
- Discipline: Educational Science

Inge Hansen-Schaberg (born 11 March 1954) is a German educational researcher.

== Life ==
Born in Flensburg, Hansen-Schaberg studied German and biology at the Pädagogische Hochschule Berlin from 1974 and passed the state examinations in 1980 and 1983. She then worked at a West Berlin primary and secondary school until 1989. Hansen-Schaberg was awarded a doctorate in 1991 with her dissertation Minna Specht – eine Sozialistin in der Landerziehungsheimbewegung (1918–1951). Untersuchung zur pädagogischen Biographie einer Reformpädagogin. at the TU Berlin and his habilitation in 1998 at the University of Potsdam.

She became a private lecturer at the Institute of Educational Science at the TU Berlin in 1998. In 2003, she was appointed as an extraordinary professor. Her work focuses on 20th century education, girls' education and coeducation, pedagogical biographies and childhood, youth and school in exile. She conducts research on the Austrian pedagogue Ernst Papanek.

Hansen-Schaberg has been head of the working group "Women in Exile" in the "Society for Exile Research" since 2001 and has been its deputy chairman since 2005.

Hansen-Schaberg is involved as a citizen at her place of residence in Rotenburg (Wümme) as chairperson of the sponsoring association "Cohn-Scheune" e.V., Jewish Museum and Cultural Workshop.

== Publications ==
- Minna Specht – Eine Sozialistin in der Landerziehungsheimbewegung (1918 bis 1951). Untersuchung zur pädagogischen Biographie einer Reformpädagogin. Frankfurt : Lang, 1992, ISBN 3-631-44250-5
- Rückkehr und Neuanfang. Die Wirkungsmöglichkeiten der Pädagoginnen Olga Essig, Katharina Petersen und Minna Specht im westlichen Deutschland der Nachkriegszeit. In Jahrbuch für Historische Bildungsforschung, vol. 1 (1993), pp. 319–338
- (ed.): "etwas erzählen". Die lebensgeschichtliche Dimension in der Pädagogik. Bruno Schonig zum 60. Geburtstag. Baltmannsweiler 1997
- with Beate Schmeichel-Falkenberg (ed.): Frauen erinnern : Widerstand, Verfolgung, Exil, 1933–1945, Tagungsband, Berlin : Weidler, 2000
- with Bruno Schonig (ed.): Reformpädagogische Schulkonzepte, vol. 5: Freinet-Pädagogik. Baltmannsweiler : Schneider, 2002 ISBN 3-89676-502-7
- with Bruno Schonig: Basiswissen Pädagogik. Reformpädagogische Schulkonzepte vol. 6: Waldorf-Pädagogik. Baltmannsweiler : Schneider, 2002 ISBN 3-89676-503-5
- (ed.): Als Kind verfolgt : Anne Frank und die anderen. Berlin : Weidler, 2004 ISBN 3-89693-244-6
- with Christian Ritzi (ed.): Wege von Pädagoginnen vor und nach 1933. Baltmannsweiler : Schneider, 2004 ISBN 3-89676-768-2
- Ethik der Erinnerung in der Praxis. 2005
- Familiengeschichte(n). Erfahrungen und Verarbeitung von Exil und Verfolgung im Leben der Töchter. 2006
- Das Politische wird persönlich – Familiengeschichte(n). 2007
- with Hiltrud Häntzschel (ed.): Politik – Parteiarbeit – Pazifismus in der Emigration : Frauen handeln. Munich : edition text + kritik, 2010
- (ed.): Landerziehungsheim-Pädagogik, Reformpädagogische Schulkonzepte, vol. 2, Baltmannsweiler : Schneider, 2012 ISBN 978-3-8340-0962-3
- mit Wolfgang Thöner, Adriane Feustel (ed.): Entfernt : Frauen des Bauhauses während der NS-Zeit – Verfolgung und Exil. Munich : edition text + kritik, 2012 ISBN 978-3-86916-212-6
- mit Sylvia Asmus, Germaine Goetzinger, Hiltrud Häntzschel (ed.): Auf unsicherem Terrain. Briefeschreiben im Exil. Munich : edition text + kritik, 2013
- with Hildegard Feidel-Mertz (ed.): Hilde Jarecki: Spielgruppen – Ein praxisbezogener Zugang. Bad Heilbrunn : Julius Klinkhardt, 2014 ISBN 978-3-7815-1977-0
- with Irene Below, Maria Kublitz-Kramer (ed.): Das Ende des Exils? Briefe von Frauen nach 1945. München : edition text + kritik, 2015, ISBN 3869163739
- with Irene Below, Hiltrud Häntzschel, Maria Kublitz-Kramer (ed.): Fluchtorte – Erinnerungsorte. Sanary-sur-Mer, Les Milles, Marseille. Munich : edition text + kritik, 2017 ISBN 978-3-86916-603-2
- Lisa Seiden: "Bleib immer mit deinem Bruder zusammen! : eine Geschichte vom "Kindertransport". Herausgegeben und mit einem Nachwort von Inge Hansen-Schaberg. Übersetzung aus dem Spanischen von Dieter Heymann. Berlin : Hentrich, 2018 ISBN 978-3-95565-265-4
