= Schmeck =

Schmeck is a surname. Notable people with the surname include:

- Herbert Schmeck (1890–1956), American roller coaster designer
- Ingrid Schmeck (born 1944), German visual artist

== See also ==
- Das große Abenteuer des Kaspar Schmeck, 1982 East German film
- Schmeckfest, festival in South Dakota
