= Peter Mertes =

Peter Mertes KG
- Type: Kommanditgesellschaft (KG)
- Founded: 1924
- Headquarters: Bernkastel-Kues, Germany
- Key people: Managing directors: Michael Willkomm; Stefan Willkomm; Matthias Willkomm; Georg Graf von Walderdorff
- Products: wines, wine-based beverages, sparkling wines, cocktails
- Revenue: over €300 million (2024)
- Number of employees: over 400 (2024)
- Website: www.mertes.de

The Peter Mertes KG is a German wine company based in Bernkastel-Kues on the river Moselle. The family-run business is Germany's largest winery and produces wines, wine-based beverages, sparkling wines, cocktails, spirit-based RTD's, and alcohol-free products. More than one million beverage units are bottled each day. The company manufactures both brand wines and private label wines, which are distributed through the German and international food retail sector. Additionally, the company provides contract bottling services for other producers. Peter Mertes employs over 400 people.

== History ==
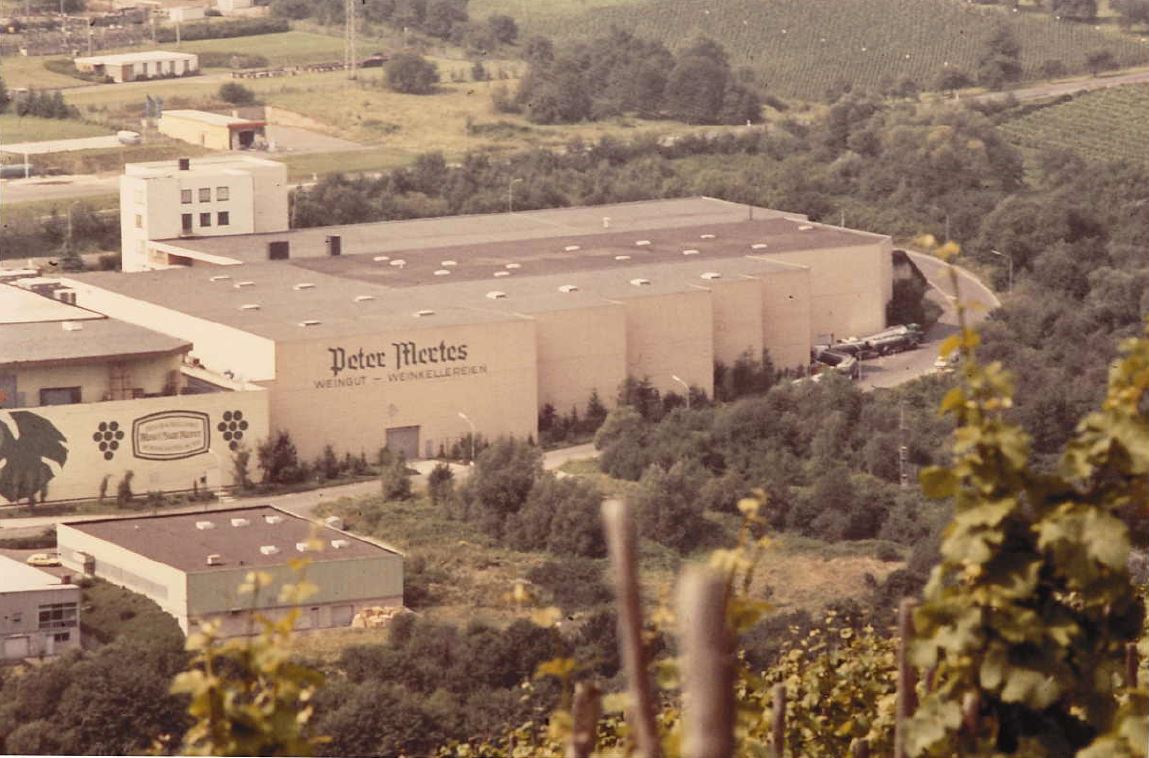
Company headquarters of Peter Mertes, ca. 1990

The company was founded in 1924 by the winery owner and master winemaker Peter Mertes in Minheim on the Moselle. Since then, the company has been engaged in the production and distribution of wines and wine products both domestically and internationally. In 1934, the first international export took place to Luxembourg. During World War II, Maria Mertes, the company founder's wife, temporarily took over the management of the company. After the war, in 1947, a winery was built in Minheim with a storage capacity of 100,000 liters.

In 1952, Peter Mertes' daughter Edith Mertes and her husband Gustav Willkomm took over the management of the company. They gradually expanded operations to the wine-growing regions of Rheinhessen, Palatinate, Rheingau, and Nahe.

In 1960, Peter Mertes became one of the first German wineries to start supplying wines to the retail sector, with the goal of making wine a readily available and standardized product. This involved developing a business model in which Peter Mertes purchased grapes, must, or wines from vintners based on fixed contracts, ensuring a reliable supply of raw materials for the company. During 1962, Peter Mertes introduced one of the first automated bottling lines in the Mosel wine-growing region. In the 1960s, the product range was expanded, and in 1969, due to company growth, a production site was established in Bernkastel-Kues, which has since been expanded.

In the third generation, under the leadership of brothers Michael and Stefan Willkomm, the company expanded its offerings beyond wine. Since then, it has offered cocktails and sparkling wines as well as, since 1987, organic wines. At the same time, Renate Willkomm, wife of Michael Willkomm, established a quality management system covering oenology, laboratory analysis, and cellar management. In 1992, Peter Mertes received licensing rights for wines and sparkling wines for the company Käfer-Gruppe. In 2006, the company began introducing its own branded wines.

In 2009, the winery started offering contract bottling services. Since 2010, the company has been managed by Matthias Willkomm, the great-grandson of the founder, and Georg Graf von Walderdorff. In 2020, Peter Mertes acquired the wine and sparkling wine brand Deinhard, which had previously belonged to Henkell & Co. Sektkellerei.

== Company structure ==
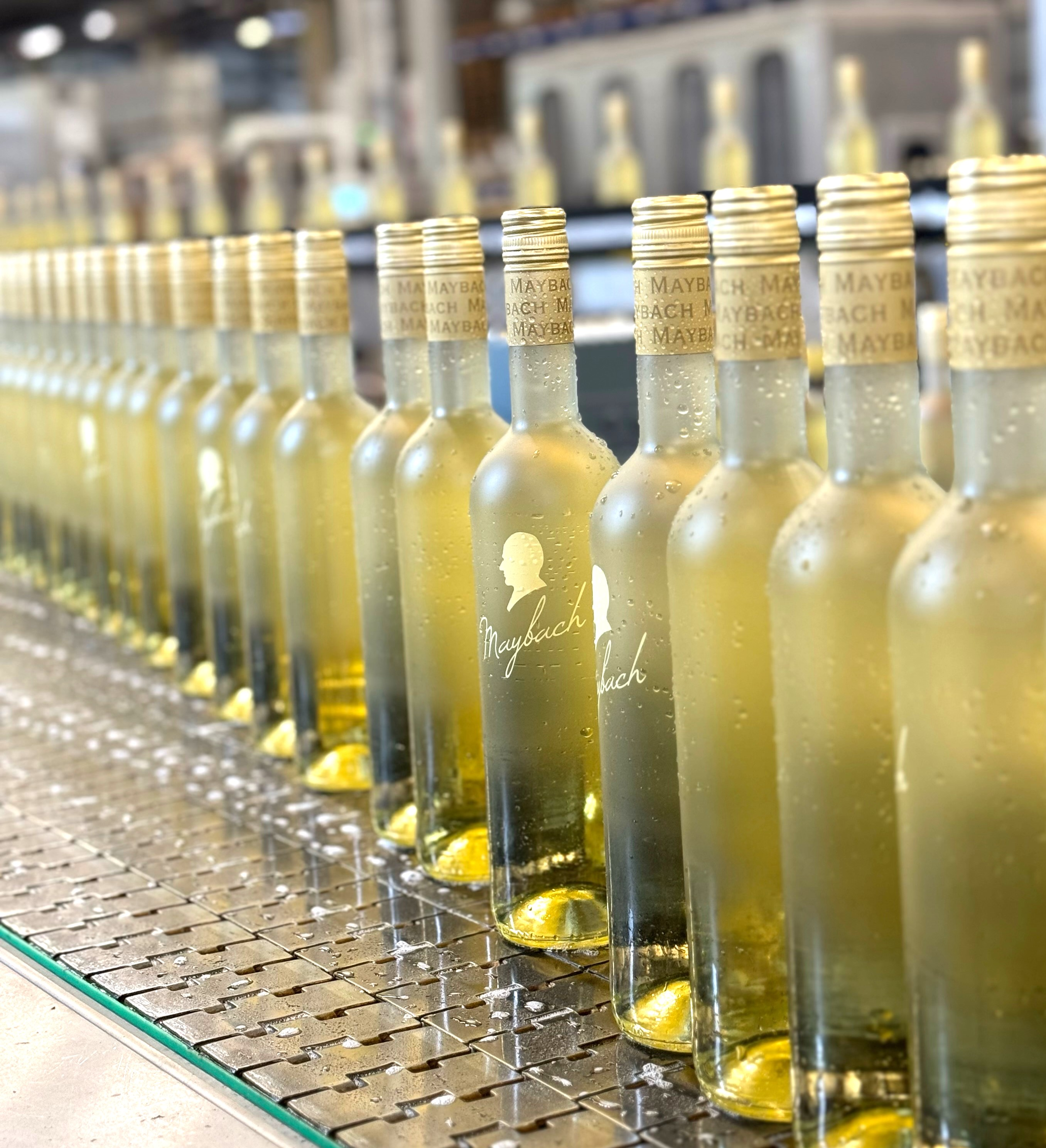
Peter Mertes production plant in 2024

The headquarters of Peter Mertes are located in Bernkastel-Kues on the Middle Moselle. Around one million beverage units are bottled per day in glass bottles of various sizes, Tetra Paks, bag-in-boxes, and cans. The wines, wine-based cocktails, and sparkling wines are exported to up to 60 countries. In the 2023 fiscal year, the company generated more than €300 million in revenue. Around 60% of the wine processed by Peter Mertes comes from Germany, with the company often maintaining long-term partnerships with its suppliers, some spanning decades.

In addition to its own production, Peter Mertes also fills generic brand wines for retail and offers contract bottling for other manufacturers.

The company includes the Rotwild Keller, a 240-meter-long slate vault cellar from the 19th century in Bernkastel-Kues.

The company's brands include the wine brands "Bree", "Biorebe", "Landlust", "Maybach", "Rotwild", and "Deinhard", as well as the canned wine brand "City". As a licensing partner, Peter Mertes also produces wines, cocktails, and sparkling wines under the label of the Munich delicatessen house Feinkost Käfer.

== Peter Mertes family wineries ==
The vineyards of the company are grouped under Peter Mertes Familienweingüter PM Family Vineyards KG.

The Peter Mertes Familienweingüter acquires businesses without succession, invests in modern equipment, and strategically realigns the wineries for the market. The goal is to preserve centuries-old vineyard areas in the local wine-growing region. In total, the wineries under Peter Mertes Familienweingüter cultivate around 120 hectares of vineyards along the Mosel, Saar, and Ruwer. The Weingut Witwe Dr. H. Thanisch Erben Müller-Burggraef, with its historic Doctorkeller located directly beneath the Bernkasteler Doctor vineyard, is among the Familienweingüter's holdings.

== Awards ==
In 2009, Peter Mertes received the Red Dot Design Award in the category of communication design for its Bree brand.

In 2024, Peter Mertes was named one of Germany's best training companies for the seventh consecutive time in the annual study "Germany's Best Training Companies" by Focus Money. In both 2023 and 2024, Peter Mertes was recognized in the "Germany's Companies with a Future" study conducted by Stern and the personnel marketing agency Territory Embrace.

In 2024, the company received the "All Beverage Award" from the trade journal Deutsche Lebensmittel-Rundschau for two new Spritz beverages.

At the end of 2023, a trainee from the company was named Germany's Best Wine Technologist of 2023 by the Association of German Chambers of Industry and Commerce.

== Scholarships and sponsorships ==
Since 1985, the Bonner Kunstverein has been awarding the Peter Mertes Scholarship, a nomination-based scholarship to which candidates are selectively invited by annually changing experts. The award consists of a monthly grant for one year, followed by an exhibition with a catalog. It is explicitly aimed at young artists, often those who have just completed their education.

The company sponsors the Peter Mertes Achterpreis for men's and women's teams at the annual rowing regatta "Um den Grünen Moselpokal" in Bernkastel-Kues. With the Biorebe brand, Peter Mertes also sponsors the "#beebetter" initiative by Burda Verlag, which is dedicated to protecting wild bees.
