= Sociology of art =

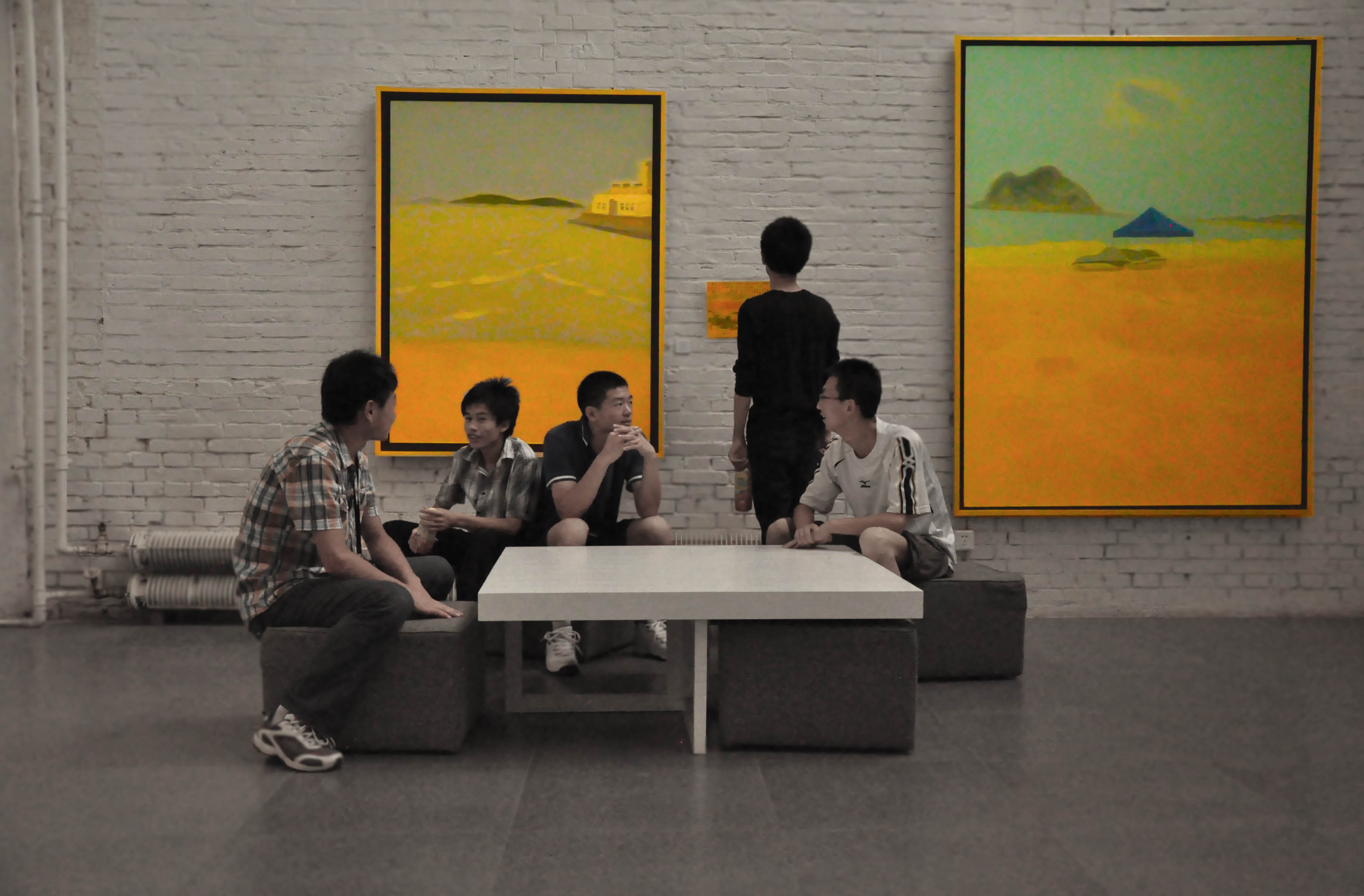
Inside a gallery at the 798 Art District in Beijing, China.

The sociology of art is a subfield of sociology that explores the societal dimensions of art and aesthetics.

Scholars who have written on the sociology of art include Pierre Bourdieu, Vera Zolberg, Howard S. Becker, Arnold Hauser, and Harrison White.

== Approaches ==
In her 1970 book Meaning and Expression: Toward a Sociology of Art, Hanna Deinhard gives one approach:

"The point of departure of the sociology of art is the question: How is it possible that works of art, which always originate as products of human activity within a particular time and society and for a particular time, society, or function -- even though they are not necessarily produced as 'works of art' -- can live beyond their time and seem expressive and meaningful in completely different epochs and societies? On the other hand, how can the age and society that produced them be recognized in the works"?

Other approaches consider the social and economic background to the creation of works of art, which has been a great focus of art history in recent decades. For example, research has examined the role of gender and nationality of artists in museum exhibition and textbook inclusion. The role of patrons and consumers of art, as well as those of the artist(s) themselves, are considered. Work into the role geographic location of art collections/collectors has been shown to affect the prestige and recognition of collectors in the art world. There has also been a great interest in the history of art collecting, and the history of older objects between their creation and their current location, beyond a mere provenance. Recent work has also employed new analysis techniques such as social network analysis to understand how an artist's reputation can be affected by association with other artists in exhibition.

== See also ==
- Sociology of culture
- Anthropology of art
- Art world
- Art market
- Private collection
- Curator
