= Muthesius Academy of Art =

Art school in Kiel, Germany

- Muthesius Kunsthochschule
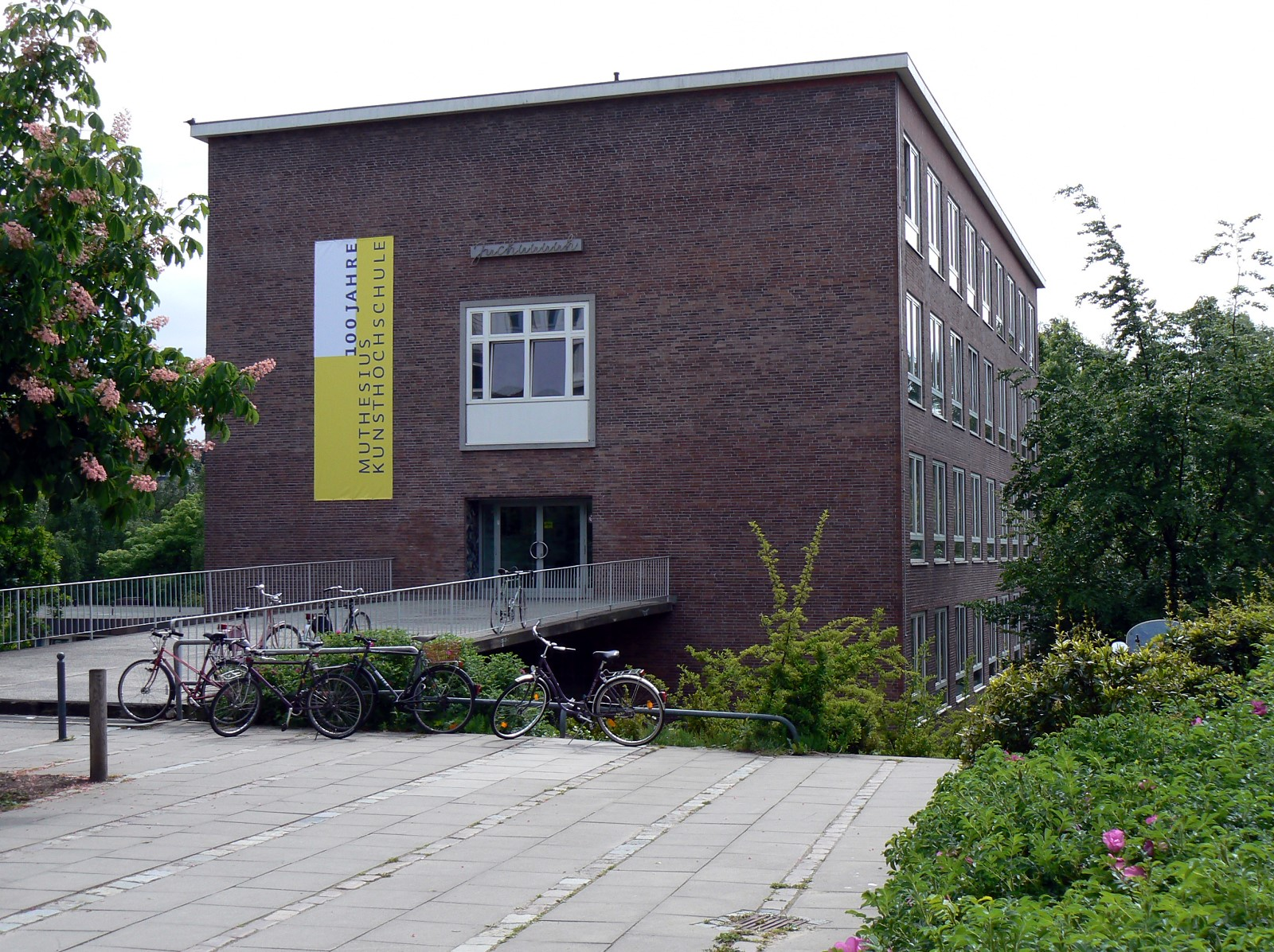
- Former names: Städtische Handwerker- und Kunstgewerbeschule, Technische und kunstgewerbliche, Muthesius-Werkschule Kiel für Handwerk und angewandte Kunst Fachschule, Muthesius-Werkkunstschule, Muthesius-Hochschule – Fachhochschule für Kunst und Gestaltung die Selbstständigkeit
- Type: undergraduate
- Established: 1907
- President: Arne Zerbst
- Location: Legienstrasse 35, Kiel, Schleswig-Holstein, Germany; 54.327816°N 10.129070°E
- Website: www.muthesius-kunsthochschule.de

Courtyard of the Muthesius Academy of Art

Muthesius Academy of Art (German: Muthesius Kunsthochschule) is an art school and is located in the city of Kiel in Schleswig-Holstein, Germany. The school was named for architect Hermann Muthesius. The school was founded in 1907 as an Arts and Crafts (movement) and handicraft school, the current version of the school including the name and art school status started in 2005.

== History ==
The school was founded in 1907 under the name Städtische Handwerker und Kunstgewerbeschule (English: Municipal Crafts and Arts and Crafts School). In 1910, the name changed to, Technische und kunstgewerbliche Fachschule (English: Technical and Arts and Crafts School). After World War II in 1945, the name changed to, Muthesius-Werkschule Kiel für Handwerk und angewandte Kunst (English: Muthesius Werkschule Kiel for Handicrafts and Applied Arts). In 1966, it was renamed, Muthesius-Werkkunstschule (English: Muthesius Work Art School).

From 1972 to 1974, the school was incorporated into Kiel University of Applied Sciences. However in 1974, the school became independent again under the name, Muthesius-Hochschule – Fachhochschule für Kunst und Gestaltung (English: Muthesius University - University of Applied Sciences for Art and Design). In 2005, the school officially became an art school and started using the current name, Muthesius Kunsthochschule.

== Notable alumni ==
- Alexandra (singer) (1942–1969) studied graphic design in 1959.
- Elsbeth Arlt (1948–2015), painter, studied from 1969 to 1971.
- Rudolf Behrend (1895–1975), painter and graphic artist.
- Bodo Baumgarten (born 1940), painter.
- Illa Blaue (1919–2018), painter, evening classes at the school before World War II.
- Shahin Charmi (born 1953), multimedia art, muralist
- Friedrich Peter Drömmer (1889–1968), painter and commercial artist
- Ritha Elmholt (born 1947), painter and author
- Menno Fahl (born 1967), painter, graphic artist and sculptor
- Otto Flath (1906–1987), wood sculptor
- Donald von Frankenberg (born 1951), artist
- Bertrand Freiesleben (born 1967), sculptor, never graduated.
- Gunther Gerlach (born 1952), sculptor
- Ralf Groene (born 1968), industrial designer
- Frank Jörg Haberland (born 1958), visual artist
- Andreas Illiger (born 1982), video game developer.
- Hertha Nehve (1905–?), watercolorist.
- Frank Otto (born 1957) studied painting, entrepreneur
- Jörg Plickat (born 1954), sculptor
- Birgit Rautenberg (born 1969), photographer
- Ingrid M. Schmeck (born 1944), graphic designer and illustrator, studied at Muthesius Academy of Art from 1962 to 1967.
- René Schoemakers (born 1972), painter
- Werner Schreib (1925–1969), painter and graphic artist
- Bernhard Schwichtenberg (born 1938), artist and professor for 3D graphic design
- Ben Siebenrock (1951–2018), sculptor
Muthesius Academy of Art alumni

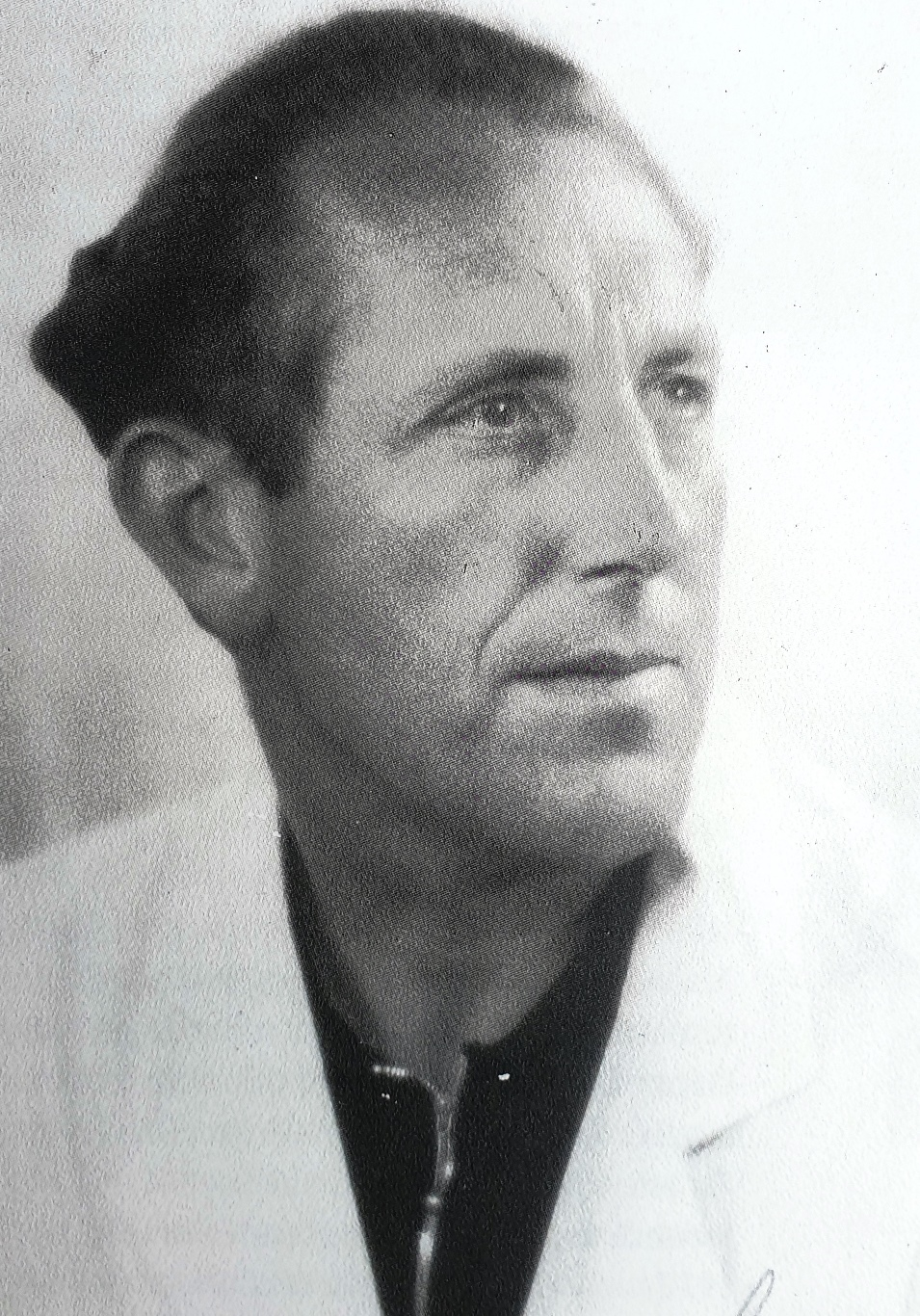

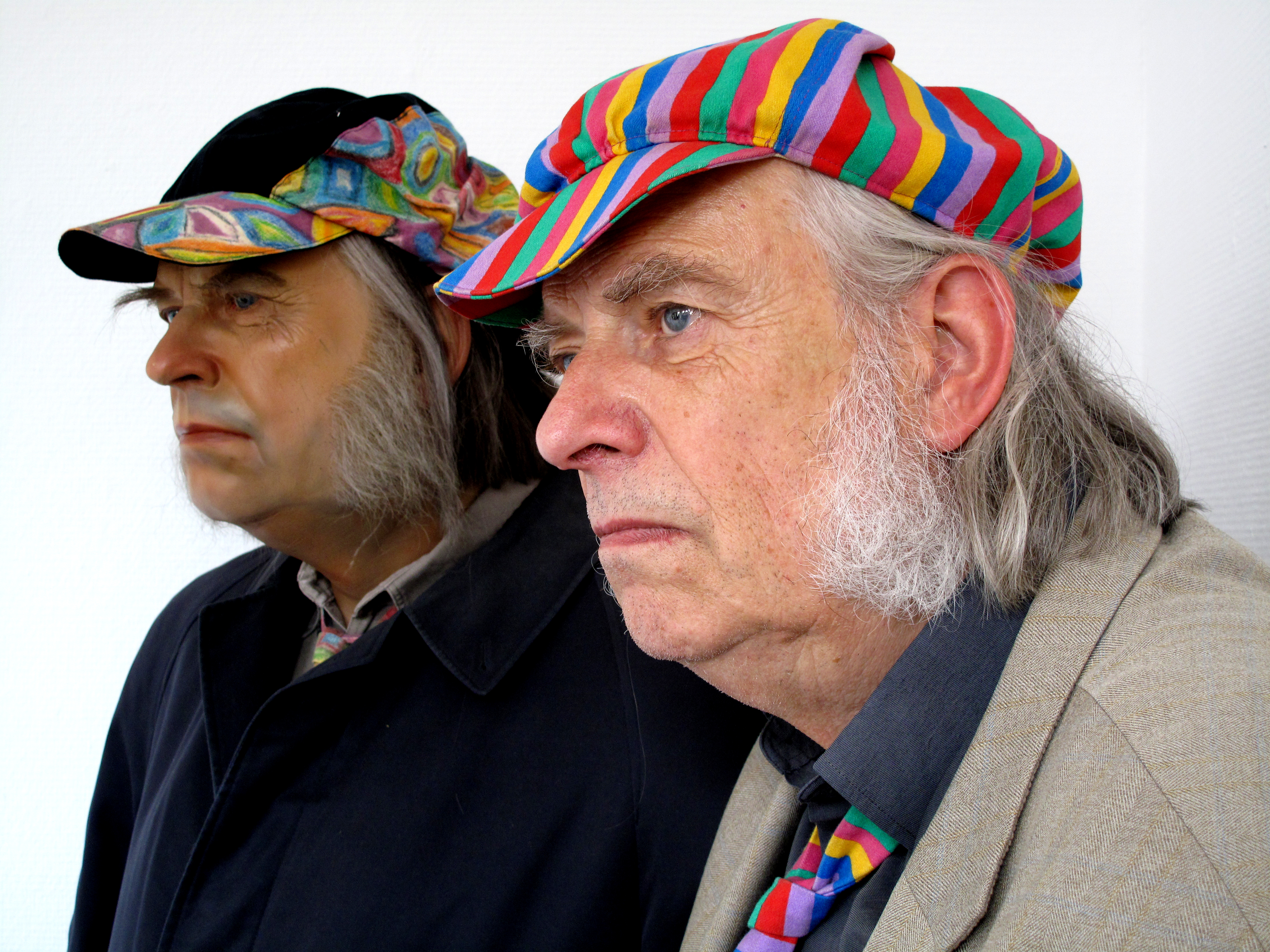

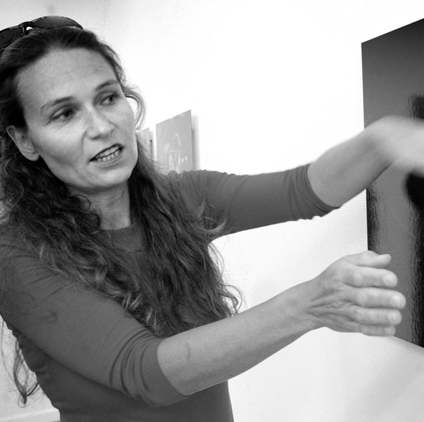

== Notable faculty ==
- Gottfried Brockmann (1903–1983) painter, book publisher.
- Arnold Dreyblatt
- Theresa Georgen (born 1946), art historian, taught at Muthesius Academy of Art from 1994 to 1999.
- Petra Maria Meyer
- Piotr Nathan
- Albert-Jan Pool (born 1960), type designer.
- Christiane Kruse
- Annika Frye
- Detlef Rhein
- Oswald Egger
