= Beate Schmeichel-Falkenberg =

German female writer and journalist

Beate Schmeichel-Falkenberg, real name Beate Hartung (20 June 1926 – 17 September 2017) was a German teacher and author.

== Life ==
Born in Hamm, Schmeichel-Falkenberg studied German and English at the University of Göttingen and then worked as a journalist for the BBC in England. Later she returned to Münster and worked as a teacher. With her second husband Manfred Schmeichel, she founded a special education school in Mössingen, which is part of today's Stiftung KBF.

Schmeichel-Falkenberg worked for some time at Westdeutscher Rundfunk as a presenter in the programme Hier und heute and at the University of Münster at the Institutum Judaicum.

She was co-founder of the Else-Lasker-Schüler-Gesellschaft and the Kurt Tucholsky-Gesellschaft. In the "Society for Exile Research" she headed the working group "Women in Exile".

Schmeickel-Falkenberg lived in Mössingen where she died at the age of 91 and was buried in the local cemetery.

== Publications ==
- with Siglinde Bolbecher and the Theodor Kramer Gesellschaft: Frauen im Exil, Tagungsband, Klagenfurt : Drava, 2007
- with Ursula Wiedenmann: Grenzen überschreiten : Frauen, Kunst und Exil, Tagungsband, Würzburg : Königshausen & Neumann, 2005
- with Simone Barck and Anneke de Rudder: Jahrhundertschicksale. Frauen im sowjetischen Exil.Lukas, Berlin 2003.
- with Inge Hansen-Schaberg: Frauen erinnern : Widerstand, Verfolgung, Exil, 1933-1945, Tagungsband, Berlin : Weidler, 2000
- with Manfred Schmeichel: Hilfe für körperbehinderte Kinder, Stuttgart : Klett-Cotta 1978
