= Stella Rotenberg =

Austrian author (1915-2013)

- Born: Stella Siegmann; 27 March 1915; Vienna, Austro-Hungarian empire
- Died: 3 July 2013 (aged 98); Leeds, Yorkshire, England
- Education: Vienna
- Occupations: Writer-poet holocaust victim and survivor
- Spouse: Wolf Rotenberg (1913−1992)
- Children: Adrian
- Parent(s): Bernhard and Regine Siegmann

Stella Rotenberg (born Stella Siegmann: 27 March 1915 - 3 July 2013) was a German language writer of prose and lyric poetry, originally from Vienna. For reasons of race and politics she was obliged to abandon her university medical studies in 1938 and to flee the country. She was keen to emigrate to England, but the necessary visa was not forthcoming and in March 1939 she fled, instead, to the Netherlands. Her brother Erwin had escaped to Sweden the previous year. For her Jewish parents, who were by this time beyond working age, there seemed to be no hope of admission to a foreign country: they remained behind. Stella Siegmann's long-awaited visa from the British was finally received in August 1939 and she moved to England where, a few months later, she married a fellow Austrian exile called Wolf Rotenberg. For the remaining 64 years of her life Stella Rotenberg lived in England, from 1948 in Leeds (Yorkshire). The language she preferred to use for her published work was always German, however.

== Life ==
=== Provenance and early years ===
Stella Siegmann was born into an assimilated Jewish family in Vienna and grew up in the city's 20th district, a densely populated quarter a little to the north of the city centre, and located on the island formed by the channeling that two centuries before created the "Danube Canal". Bernhard Siegmann, Stella's father, was a trader in textiles and fabrics. Her brother, Erwin, was a year older than she. The family was not wealthy, but Bernhard and Regine Siegmann were keen to ensure that their two children received a proper education. Beyond that they were, by the standards of the time and place, open-minded and flexible in their approach to parenting, allowing their children a considerable degree of freedom.

- "I never learned to read: reading sort of flowed into me. My brother is older than I am, and when he went to school he learned to read. I sat with him and sort of 'co-read' with him. I never had to learn reading: I could always read. That really did me no good, because I probably took onboard the idea that everything just came to me, without any need to learn anything. So I learned nothing: I wanted to do nothing except read!"
- "Ich habe nie lesen gelernt, das Lesen ist mir sozusagen zugeflogen. Mein Bruder ist älter als ich, und als er in die Schule ging, lernte er lesen. Ich bin nebenan gesessen und habe sozusagen mitgelesen. Ich habe nie lesen lernen müssen, ich habe immer lesen können. Das hat mir eigentlich nicht gut getan, denn wahrscheinlich nahm ich seither an, dass mir alles zufliegen sollte und man nichts lernen müsste. Denn ich hab nichts gelernt; ich wollte nichts tun als lesen!"
  Stella Rotenberg quoted by Chiara Conterno, 2017
- "I always loved German. German was my favourite subject [at school]. We had a teacher who took us for an hour on Saturdays, the last hour of the day, which I always looked forward to. She always read us something out loud."
- "Deutsch habe ich immer gern gehabt. Deutsch war mein Lieblingsfach. [...] Eine Lehrerin haben wir gehabt, die hat eine Stunde gehabt am Samstag, die letzte Stunde, auf das habe ich mich gefreut. Sie hat nämlich immer etwas vorgelesen."
  Stella Rotenberg quoted by Edith Petschnigg, 2018

She attended junior school locally. As she would later recall, even at this early stage she was aware of antisemitic sentiments on the streets and in the school corridors. She would also always remember the religious studies teacher challenging the mainstream antisemitism at the predominantly Roman Catholic school, telling the children that "Jews are human too". (Note: "Es gab genug Nazis. Ja, antisemitisch waren die Wiener, die Österreicher immer. Sie sind ein römisch-katholisches Land gewesen. Der Religionslehrer in der Schule für die Römisch-Katholischen, der war anders. ... Der hat den Kindern gesagt, die Juden sind auch Menschen. ... den habe ich gern gehabt." Stella Rotenberg quoted by Edith Petschnigg, 2018) (Note: Edith Petschnigg suggests that further insights into the increasingly mainstream presence of antisemitism on the Vienna streets during the first part of the twentieth century can be found in Arthur Schnitzler's 1908 novel Der Weg ins Freie.) She moved on to the Staats-Unterrealschule (as the Brigittenauer Gymnasium – secondary school – was known at that time), near the Augarten park, and also in Vienna's 20th district. As before, most of her school friends and contemporaries were non-Jewish. When she was about fifteen Stella Siegmann and her brother Erwin took part on a schools-arranged camping break during which she made the acquaintance of Jura Soyfer who at the age of nineteen was in the process of embarking on his own career as a precociously gifted and politically committed writer. Her own intense love of the German language was awakened while she was still at school. This, and her love of reading, seem always to have been an important element in her being. As a girl her favourite author was Thomas Mann, to whose multi-layered works she returned, fascinated, again and again. Others whose works she particularly admired included "Klabund" and Brecht. Reading for Stella Siegmann was no mere pastime for idle moments. It was and remained a core dependency and, in dark times, a vital therapy. The years between 1926 and 1930 were probably the happiest of her young life, but she was nevertheless aware of the darkening political clouds, of the fatal Palace of Justice revolt and later, in 1934, of the brutally crushed insurrection on the streets of Vienna in February of that year.

In the early summer of 1934 Stella Siegmann successfully concluded her school career. She teamed up with her brother Erwin and a friend to undertake an extended tour of Europe, taking in Italy, France, Belgium and the Netherlands. In Milan she met Jewish refugees from Nazi Germany. More generally, during their tour she came to a wider appreciation that antisemitism, far from being a peculiarly Viennese phenomenon, was widespread and intensifying across Europe. Returning to Vienna, in the Fall/Autumn she enrolled at the university to study Medicine. Her brother had done the same a year earlier. It was nevertheless, at that time, an unusual step for a woman, especially for a Jewish woman.

=== Anschluss ===
The 1930s was a decade of intensifying politicisation and polarisation across German speaking Europe. Siegmann became aware of growing levels of support among fellow students for the banned (after 1933) Communist Party and for the National Socialists. After 12 March 1938 everything changed for Erwin and Stella Siegmann when Austria was incorporated into Nazi Germany. Although the transformation came about through military invasion, there was strong support across Austria for the idea of a united German state which extended well beyond hardened Nazi activists. But for Austrian Jews the so-called "Anschluss" marked the beginning of the end. Stella and Erwin were forced to quit their medical studies and a period of government mandated violence, disenfranchisement and humiliation followed. Her father's business was "aryanised" (expropriated) while the family's little apartment was first plundered and then taken over. Regine Siegmann was "badly mistreated" and an uncle was beaten up so badly that he became deaf. The family were moved to a "mass housing unit". Stella Siegmann who as a young adult had worn her ethnicity relatively lightly, now found refuge in Judaism which she came to see as the embodiment of non-violent principles of charity and respect for the law.

=== Escape ===
In July 1938 Erwin Siegmann managed to escape to Stockholm. His sister set her sights on emigration to England. She knew that there was a serious shortage there of domestic servants, which meant that for young women it would be relatively easy to obtain an entry visa and obtain work as a housemaid. She contacted the British "Home Office" (interior ministry) in London and received an assurance that as a medical student she would be able to work as a trainee carer ("Pfleger-Lehrling") in a British hospital. But no visa came. In Vienna, antisemitic persecution persisted, while the German take-over in Czechoslovakia brought the prospect of a wider European war into a clearer focus, which could only lead to increased difficulties in Vienna. When she had applied for her British visa, she had also had the prescience to apply for a visa to work as a servant ("Hausgehilfinnen-Visum") in the Netherlands. On 14 March 1939, she departed from the "Westbahnhof" on the train to Amsterdam. She would never see her parents again. Her brother had secured Swedish entry documents for them, but the German authorities were disinclined to let them leave the country without payment of prohibitively inflated fees to the government Vermögensverkehrsstelle(loosely, "Property Transaction Office."). Stella Siegmann took work as a domestic servant in Leiden, running the home of a single forty-year-old man whose aspirations for her were evidently inappropriate. She spoke about this to the Refugee Committee in den Haag who switched her to an alternative (but unpaid) job, in return for her board and lodging, at an orphanage in den Haag.

Stella Rotenberg was troubled for a long time by the knowledge that she had simultaneously applied for residence and a work permit in two different countries:

- "I often worry that by doing this I may have deprived someone else of the chance to live, but I do [also] know that the refugees who stayed in Holland did not survive [after the German invasion of May 1940]."
- "Es bedrängt mich oft, daß ich dadurch einer anderen die Lebensmöglichkeit weggenommen haben mag, aber ich weiß, daß die Flüchtlinge, die in Holland verblieben sind, nicht überlebt haben."
  Stella Rotenberg quoted by Edith Petschnigg, 2018

Her experiences in the Netherlands were in some respects disappointing. As international tensions increased the governments in western Europe took a less welcoming approach to Germany's many refugees, and during her time working at the orphanage she was required to report to a police station every day. In August 1939, shortly before the outbreak (for England and Germany, if not yet for the Netherlands) of the Second World War, the long-awaited visa for Britain arrived, and Siegmann immediately traveled by boat across the North Sea to London. The development was the more welcome because by this time, as she later recalled, she had a "boyfriend" in England. Almost immediately she accepted a traineeship as a carer at a psychiatric hospital in Colchester (Essex). Her initial impressions of England were only positive. Here was a country where refugees could find work and the opportunity to integrate. There are, however, powerful indications that she soon encountered a darker side to English society, through her work in the Colchester psychiatric hospital: these gave rise to darkly bitter resonances in several of her later poems.

Living and working in Colchester meant that Stella Siegmann was cut off from almost all the German and Austrian exiles who had come to England and who stayed in and around London. She spoke no English, but necessity and her superb ear for language enabled her to learn it very quickly, so that her greater concern became that she would forget her German. She was nevertheless too frightened, under the conditions of those times, to speak any words of German in public.

=== Wolf ===
One person who came to visit her a few weeks after she arrived in England was her "boyfriend" Wolf Rotenberg. Wolf Rotenberg was of Polish-Jewish provenance but his family had settled in Vienna and in 1938 he had been deprived of his Polish citizenship after refusing to perform military service in the Polish army. The two of them had been medical students together in Vienna. They married at a registry office in Colchester on 23 October 1939. At around the same time Wolf Rotenberg was accepted into the Pioneer Corps of the British army. As a result of his successive postings to different parts of England the newly married couple lived in a succession of locations, which for Stella involved giving up her work at the Colchester psychiatric hospital. They lived successively in Devonshire and Somerset: she found work as a medical assistant. By 1945 the Rotenbergs were living in the north of England, in Darlington, where Stella Rotenbnerg had found work as a book keeper. The couple's only recorded son, Adrian, was born in 1951.

=== 1940s England ===
In the early part of 1940 Stella Rotenberg wrote her first published poem. She wrote, sources insist, not for publication, and certainly not for publication in Germany or Austria, but because of a compulsion to write. It would indeed be several decades before any of her poems were published. (Her poems were always written in German.) Her first poem was written while Wolf was away in France and Stella was living as a subtenant in a small room in Colchester. She was always hungry. The she was taken in by a family who fed her properly. She became a little less thin and felt a little better. There was still, in her room, hardly enough space for a bed. Nevertheless, she was able to set her suitcase before the door. Under these conditions she wrote "Ohne Heimat" (loosely, "Without a Homeland"). Her short poem corresponded with the conditions under which she was living.

- "I wanted absolutely nothing to do with Austria. I thought it wrong: everyone was blaming the Germans, and the Austrians were just the same. Hitler was Austrian ... In England only the German language is missing. Otherwise I'm just fine. Otherwise I'd have no reason to want to leave. But the absence of the [German] language, that is something that I find unfortunate."
- "Ich wollte mit Österreich überhaupt nichts zu tun haben. Denn ich habe gedacht, das ist ungerecht: Alles schimpft auf die Deutschen, und die Österreicher waren genauso. Hitler war Österreicher... Mir fehlt ja in England nur die deutsche Sprache. Sonst geht’s mir ja gut. Sonst würde ich ja gar nicht weg wollen. Aber dass mir die Sprache fehlt, das finde ich ein Malheur."
  Stella Rotenberg quoted by Edith Petschnigg, 2013 & 2018

After the war Stella Rotenberg and her brother were able to investigate their parents' fate. Bernhard and Regine Siegmann were deported towards the east on 20 May 1942 and disappeared, like thousands of others, a few days later, although the detailed circumstances of their killings were at that time unclear. Subsequent research confirms they were almost certainly murdered, either at Auschwitz or else during an unscheduled halt in a wooded area by the train transporting victims towards a death camp.

In 1946 Stella Rotenberg was granted British citizenship. Erwin Siegmann, her brother, made plans to return "home" to postwar Austria, but antisemitic incidents that he came across during a visit caused him to abandon the idea: when he died in 1990 he was still living in Stockholm. Wolf Rotenberg husband set about completing his medical training. In 1948 the Wolf and Stella moved to Leeds where Wolf undertook a practical internship at the clinic there. In the postwar austerity of those times there was still no question of the Rotenbergs having their own home. They lived instead in a small one-room service apartment at the hospital where Wolf was working. They nevertheless ended up living together in Leeds for the rest of their lives. Her poetry, which she continued to write, reflected the sense of loss in respect of her parents' murder and the life she had led in Vienna before the coming to power of National Socialism. Commentators have also drawn attention to the rich seams of biblical references in her work. Rotenberg never made any secret of her love and respect for Martin Luther's glorious translations of 1522 and 1534.

There were other German refugees also living in Leeds, but none of them felt comfortable speaking German: Stella Rotenberg was acutely aware that her English was accented. Native-born English neighbours were friendly up to a point, but acceptance was never entirely unqualified and her written work continued to reflect a sense of social isolation consistent with the Rotenbergs' position as foreign-born exiles. She also continued to be haunted by a belief that being cut off from daily use of the German language was diminishing her skill as a practitioner of it, and she feared that losing her fluency also removed one of her last surviving connections to her murdered mother.

=== Late discovery ===
Publication of her work was not on Stella Rotenberg's agenda during the 1940s and 1950s, and for a German language poet living in England the opportunities were any event limited. Neither Stella nor her brother Erwin would ever return to live in Austria. For a long time Stella Rotenberg's work remained unknown in Austria: that was a fate she shared with a number of exiled Austrian authors who after the war were unwilling unable to re-establish links with the country of their upbringing. Through the immediate post-war decades was a corresponding reluctance in Austria to engage with exiled victims of the National Socialist nightmare. Nevertheless, during the 1960s one or two of Rotenberg's poems began to turn up in newspapers and magazines in a number of different countries. The first compilation of her poems was published only in 1972, however, and it was published not in Vienna, Berlin or London, but in Tel Aviv.

The next significant compilation, published by J. G. Bläschke in Darmstadt, was "Die wir übrig sind" (Note: "Die wir übrig sind" is translated by Donal McLaughlin as "Those of us who remain") which appeared in 1978, and has been re-issued several times by different publishers subsequently. By this time a number of uncomfortable issues relating to the National Socialist years that had been subject to a widespread if informal vow of silence since 1945 were beginning to be discussed more openly, and this coincided with greater recognition and a growing academic interest in Rotenberg's work, notably in Austria and West Germany. "Scherben sind endlicher Hort" (Note: "Scherben sind endlicher Hort" is a line from a poem translated in poetic rendition by Donal McLaughlin as "What remains is still there, if in shards") and "Ungewissen Ursprungs" (Note: "Ungewissen Ursprungs" translated by Donal McLaughlin as "Of Uncertain Origin") followed in 1991 and 1997. Late in 2003 "Scherben sind endlicher Hort" became the first volume of Rotenberg's work to appear in an English language translation. By the early part of the twenty-first century a series of sympathetic translations into English by the Irish-born literary translator Donal McLaughlin were opening up Rotenberg's work to readers in Britain and Ireland, and attracting attention from anglophone scholars in those places. Back in Austria, in 2001 Stella Rotenberg became the first recipient of the Prize for Resistance Writing in Exile awarded (since then) annually by the Vienna-based Theodor Kramer Society. (Note: Theodor Kramer was another Austrian-Jewish poet from Vienna who overcame various bureaucratic hurdles to find refuge in England from National Socialism in Austria, and ended up being granted British citizenship.)

=== Death ===
Wolf Rotenberg died in 1992. Stella Rotenberg died in Leeds on 3 July 2013.

== Published output (selection) ==
- Gedichte. Olamenu, Tel-Aviv 1972.
- Die wir übrig sind. Bläschke, Darmstadt 1978.
- Scherben sind endlicher Hort. Verlag für Gesellschaftskritik, Wien 1991.
- Ungewissen Ursprungs. Gesammelte Prosa. Edited and with an afterword by Siglinde Bolbecher. With illustrations by Hildegard Stöger. Theodor Kramer Gesellschaft, Wien 1997, ISBN 978-3-901602-02-3.
- Zusammen mit Tamar Radzyner: Meine wahre Heimat. My True Homeland. Edition Mnemosnyne Band 8. Alekto-Verlag, Klagenfurt 1999, ISBN 3-900743-94-0.
- Shards. Edinburgh Review, Edinburgh 2003 (bi-lingual edition).
- An den Quell. Gesammelte Gedichte. Edited by Siglinde Bolbecher und Beatrix Müller-Kampel. Theodor Kramer Society, Wien 2003, ISBN 978-3-901602-07-8
- Beitrag in: Exil. Literatur und Gedächtnis. Ein Lesebuch. Hgg. Thomas Wallerberger, Judith Goetz, Alexander Emanuely. Verlag der Theodor Kramer-Gesellschaft, Wien 2012 ISBN 390160247X
