= Hildegard Feidel-Mertz =

German educational researcher (1930–2013)

Hildegard Feidel-Mertz (born 19 May 1930 – 23 October 2013) was a German educational researcher.

== Life ==
Born in Frankfurt, Mertz was born in a working class household. She studied at the Goethe University Frankfurt and was promoted her doctorate in 1963 with Theodor W. Adorno and Martin Rang.

From 1967 to 1972, she was employed at the Institute for Social Pedagogy and Adult Education at the University of Frankfurt, after which she became Professor for Youth and Adult Education in the Department of Social Work at the Gesamthochschule Kassel. Her main areas of work were the history of adult education, the history of workers' education, women's education and Schulen im Exil, especially Jewish exile. She also had a major influence on research into the Jüdische Landschulheime existing in Germany between 1933 and 1938.

Together with Hermann Schnorbach, Feidel-Mertz built up the "Sammlung Pädagogisch- Politische Emigration 1933-1945 (PPE)", which is now housed in the "Deutsches Exilarchiv" (German Exile Archive) of the Deutsche Nationalbibliothek in Frankfurt. She was the editor of several publications on the history of the educational exile.

In 1977, Feidel-Mertz acquired the house where Richard Huelsenbeck was born in Frankenau for her mother, a native of Frankenau, and also set up a small exhibition on the DADA movement there.

== Publications ==
- Zur Ideologie der Arbeiterbildung Frankfurt, 1964 second edition, 1967.
- Feidel-Mertz, Inge Hansen-Schaberg (ed.): Hilde Jarecki: Spielgruppen – Ein praxisbezogener Zugang. Klinkhardt Verlag, Bad Heilbrunn, Reihe Reformpädagogik im Exil, Neue Folge, vol. 12. ISBN 978-3-7815-1977-0
- (ed.): Otto Friedrich: Der Zaun ums Wissen. Eine Geschichte des Bildungsmonopols. Peter Lang Verlag, Frankfurt among others 2003, ISBN 3-631-38516-1.
- Partnerschaften von Frauen als Überlebensstrategien im Exil, in Inge Hansen-Schaberg (ed.): „etwas erzählen“. Die lebensgeschichtliche Dimension in der Pädagogik. Bruno Schonig zum 60. Geburtstag, Schneider Verlag, Hohengehren, 1997, ISBN 3-87116-898-X, pp. 107–112.
- Hildegard Feidel-Mertz, Andreas Paetz: Ein verlorenes Paradies: das Jüdische Kinder- und Landschulheim Caputh (1931–1938).. dipa Verlag, Frankfurt, 1994, ISBN 3-7638-0184-7. (3rd edition. Klinkhardt Verlag, Bad Heilbrunn 2009)
- Carl Mennicke Schriften new publication by Hildegard Feidel-Mertz. 5 volumes. Weinheim 1995 ff.
- Schulen im Exil. Die verdrängte Pädsgogik. 933–1945
- Schwierige Rückkehr aus dem Exil. In Eierdanz Kremer (ed.): weder erwartet noch gewollt . Kritische Erziehungswissenschaft im. Kalten Krieg SchneiderVerlag Hohengehren 200 pp. 47–68
- (ed.): Der junge Huelsenbeck – Entwicklungsjahre eines Dadaisten. Anabas Verlag, Gießen 1992, ISBN 3-87038-168-X.
- Hildegard Feidel-Mertz, Jürgen P. Krause: Der andere Hermann Lietz. Theo Zollmann und das Landwaisenheim Veckenstedt. dipa Verlag, Frankfurt, 1990, ISBN 3-7638-0519-2.
- (Ed.): Schulen im Exil. Die Verdrängte Pädagogik 1933 bis 1945 Rororo
- Reinbek 1983, ISBN 3-499-17789-7.
- Erziehung zum Überleben Pädagogik im Exil nach 1933. Frankfurt, 1990, ISBN 3-7638-0520-6.
- Hildegard Feidel-Mertz, Hermann Schnorbach: Lehrer in der Emigration. Der Verband deutscher Lehreremigranten (1933-39) im Traditionszusammenhang der demokratischen Lehrerbewegung. Beltz Verlag, Weinheim und Basel, 1981, ISBN 3-407-54114-7. Dazu:
  - Verband Deutscher Lehreremigranten: Informationsblätter und Programme, 1934-1939, edited by Hildegard Feidel-Mertz and Hermann Schnorbach, Beltz Verlag, Weinheim and Basel, 1981, ISBN 978-3-407-59006-0.
- Erwachsenenbildung seit 1945. Ausgangsbedingungen, Entwicklungstendenzen, Ergebnisse. Kiepenheuer und Witsch, Köln 1975, ISBN 3-462-01103-0.
- Ideologie der Arbeiterbildung. Europäische Verlags-Anstalt, Frankfurt, 1964. Second edition 1967
