= Shahin Charmi =

Iranian painter and multimedia artist

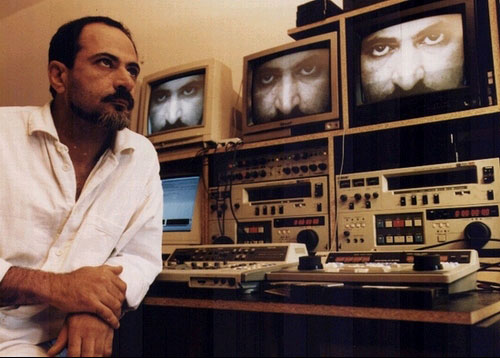
- Born: September 17, 1953 (age 72); Iran
- Education: Muthesius Academy of Art
- Years active: 1980–present
- Spouse: Patricia Bolf
- Website: charmi.org

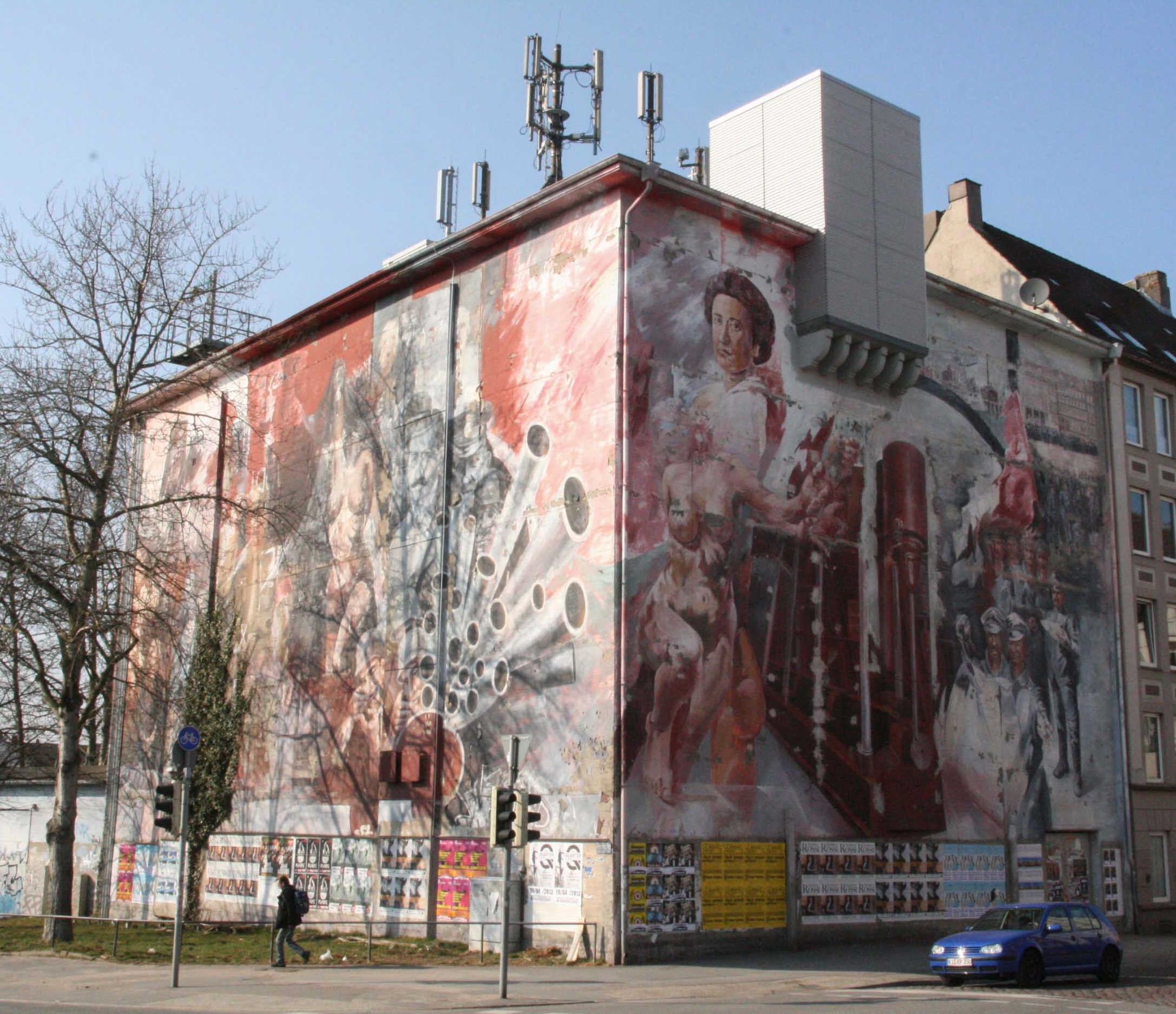
Iltisbunker, Kiel (2013)

Shahin Charmi (Persian: شاهین چرمی, born September 17, 1953) is an Iranian-born German multimedia artist, muralist, and painter.

== Biography ==
Shahin Charmi was born on September 17, 1953, in Iran. He studied at the Muthesius Academy of Art in Kiel, Germany (from 1980 until 1985), under Harald Duwe and Peter Nagel. Charmi is married to Austrian artist Patricia Bolf-Charmi.

In November 1989, Charmi painted the mural titled, Revolution und Krieg (English: Revolution and War), located at the Polecat Bunker (German: Iltisbunker Zeichnet) in the Gaardner district of Kiel. The mural is a narrative of the historical events from November 1918 and the Kiel sailor uprising, to World War II, and the murder of Rosa Luxemburg.

In 1990, Charmi was awarded the Golden Plotter Award, for computer art by the city of Gladbeck in Germany.

In 2011, Charmi worked on stage design for Rustam and Esfadyar, for the Fajr Theater Festival at the City Theater of Tehran and Vahdat Hall.

== Bibliography ==
- Shahin Charmi: Aus-Sichten [Shahin Charmi: Looking Out] (exhibition) (in German). Museum Flensburg. Kiel, Germany: Schwentine-Druck. 1987. OCLC 314305759.
- Yoshiyuki, Abe (2000). Computerkunst 2000 = Computer art 2000: Ausstellung der zehn Preisträger aus den Wettbewerben um den Goldenen Plotter der Stadt Gladbeck 1986–1998 [Computerkunst 2000 = Computer Art 2000: Exhibition of the Ten Winners from the Competitions for the Golden Plotter of the City of Gladbeck 1986–1998] (exhibition) (in German). Museum der Stadt Gladbeck, Innovationszentrum Wiesenbusch, Shahin Charmi, Hans Dehlinger, Gerhard Kammerer-Luka und Jean Baptiste Kempf, Georg Mühleck, Christof Schläger, Quido Sen, Gerd Struwe, Roman Verostko, James Faure Walker, Mark Wilson. Gladbeck, Germany: Museum der Stadt Gladbeck. ISBN 9783923815371. OCLC 741900710.
