= Siglinde Bolbecher =

Austrian historian and poet (1952–2012)

- Born: 18 June 1952; Vienna, Austria
- Died: 6 July 2012 (aged 60)
- Education: University of Vienna
- Occupations: Historian; exile researcher; poet
- Spouse: Konstantin Kaiser
- Children: 1

Siglinde Bolbecher (18 June 1952 – 6 July 2012) was an Austrian historian, exile researcher and poet.

== Life ==
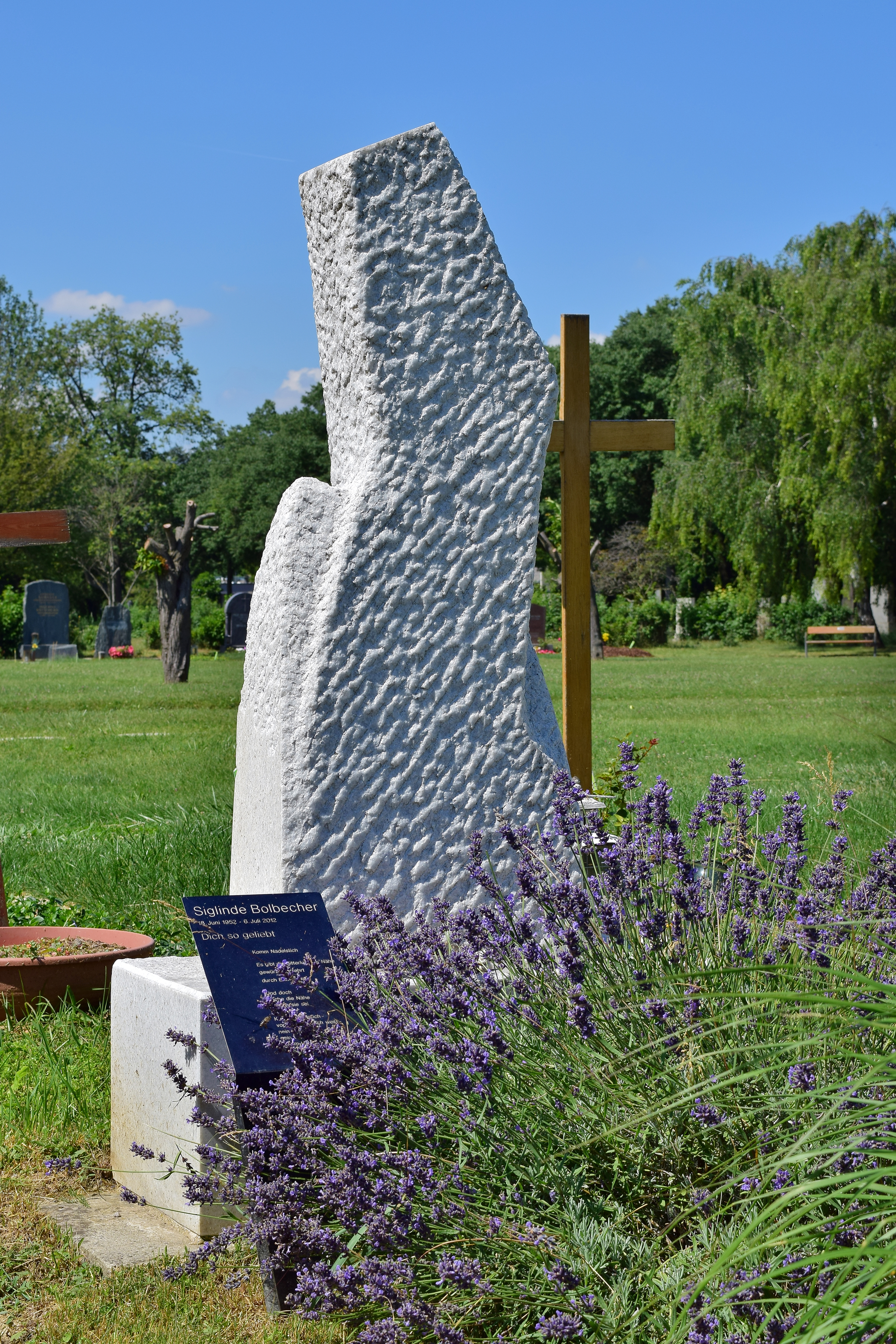
Siglinde Bolbecher's grave at Vienna Central Cemetery

Born in Vienna, Bolbecher studied theatre, English, history and philosophy at the University of Vienna. In the early 1980s, she was co-founder (and later vice-chairwoman) of the Theodor Kramer Gesellschaft and of the Verein zur Förderung und Erforschung der Antifaschistischen Literatur, whose fate she also helped to steer until her death. From 2002, she was head of the women's working group in the Austrian Society for Exile Research. Bolbecher was a freelancer at the Documentation Centre of Austrian Resistance for several years and taught at the Federal Academy for Social Work in Vienna.

She co-edited the journal for culture of exile and resistance Zwischenwelt, the Book Series on Anti-Fascist Literature and Exile Literature – Studies and Texts and the Lexicon of Austrian Exile Literature, which was worked on for 15 years. She was particularly interested in women authors, and produced works on and with Stella Kadmon, Elisabeth Freundlich, Stella Rotenberg, Grete Oplatek, Eva Kollisch, T. Scarlett Epstein among others. She also organised exhibitions and symposia on the literature of women in exile, on the image of women and men in National Socialism, on cabaret and satire in the resistance, Berthold Viertel, Elisabeth Berger. She has conceived and organised numerous conferences, among others: "Gespräch über die Rückkehr" (2005 and 2006).

Bolbecher's husband was the writer Konstantin Kaiser. Their daughter is the painter Olivia Kaiser.

On 21 March 2012, she was awarded the Decoration of Honour for Services to the Republic of Austria in recognition of her significant contribution "to the research and dissemination of Austrian exile literature".

Bolbecher died in Vienna aged 60 and was buried at the Vienna Central Cemetery (Group 40, Number 186).

Her book of poems Nadelstich was published posthumously in 2013.

== Publications ==
- Erzählte Geschichte. Berichte von Widerstandskämpfern und Verfolgten. (ed.) with the Documentation Centre of Austrian Resistance, Volume 1: Arbeiterbewegung, Österreichischer Bundesverlag, Vienna 1985, ISBN 3-215-05776-X, ISBN 3-215-05777-8.
- Literatur und Kultur des Exils in Großbritannien. Edited with Konstantin Kaiser, Donal McLaughlin, J.;M. Ritchie. Theodor Kramer Gesellschaft, Vienna 1995, ISBN 978-3-901602-10-8.
- Traum von der Realität. Berthold Viertel. Edited with Konstantin Kaiser and Peter Roessler. Döcker Verlag, Vienna 1998.
- Lexikon der österreichischen Exilliteratur. Together with Konstantin Kaiser and with the collaboration of Evelyn Adunka, Nina Jacke, Ulrike Oedl. Deuticke, Vienna 2000, ISBN 3-216-30548-1.
- Frauen im Exil. Zwischenwelt 9. Edited by Siglinde Bolbecher with the cooperation of Beate Schmeichel-Falkenberg. Drava Verlag, Vienna, Klagenfurt/Celovec 2007, ISBN 978-3-85435-368-3.
- Gedichte in Widerstand und Freiheitskampf – Lyrische Beiträge des 20. Jahrhunderts aus Österreich. Edited by Peter Ulrich Lehner. Mandelbaum Verlag, Vienna 2009, ISBN 978-3-85476-359-8.
- Subjekt des Erinnerns? Jahrbuch Zwischenwelt 12. Edited with Helene Belndorfer, Peter Roessler, Herbert Staud. Theodor Kramer Gesellschaft and DRAVA Verlag, Vienna and Klagenfurt/Celovec 2012, ISBN 978-3-85435-628-8.
- Für und wider in dieser Zeit. Die Editorials der Zeitschrift Zwischenwelt (1993–2012). Together with Konstantin Kaiser. Theodor Kramer Gesellschaft and DRAVA Verlag, Vienna and Klagenfurt/Celovec 2014, ISBN 978-3-85435-753-7.
