= Ingrid Schmeck =

German artist

- Born: 1944 (age 80–81); Poznań, Reichsgau Wartheland
- Education: Muthesius Academy of Art

Ingrid M. Schmeck (born 1944) is a German visual artist, illustrator, and graphic designer.

== Biography ==
Ingrid Schmeck was born 1944 in Poznań, Reichsgau Wartheland (present-day Poland). She was raised in Eckernförde, Germany. Schmeck studied at the Muthesius Academy of Art in Kiel in book arts, between 1962 and 1967; and between 1971 and 1973 at the Academy of Fine Arts in Hamburg.

Since 1974, she has worked as a freelance artist in Germany, Switzerland and Greece. In her pictures of houses and townscapes she has developed a distinctive, multi-perspective form of presentation. Beside urban themes, her subjects include European plants and maritime subjects, including seascapes and illustrations for the former cruise company Deilmann. One of the main subjects in her work remains the forms of appearance of European Fastnacht and Carnival, particularly traditions in Basel and Lucerne and the Alemannic range.

In numerous different solo exhibitions her work was presented in museums and galleries in Basel, Berlin, Athens, Aix-en-Provence, Coburg, Eckernförde, Genève, Goslar, Lübeck, Lucerne, Munich, Zurich as well as on the islands Sylt and Naxos.

== Bibliography ==
- Kunterbunter Regentag. Rowohlt-Verlag, Reinbek 1975.
- Neue Ansichten von Schleswig-Holstein. Text by Joachim Kruse. Verlag Wolfgang Weidlich, Frankfurt a.M. 1978, ISBN 3-8035-8359-4.
- Märchen und Sagen von Menschen und anderen wundersamen Wesen in Norddeutschland. Illustrations for a fairy tale. Christians Verlag, Hamburg 1978.
- Platt för Jungs un Deerns. Illustrations for a Low German school book. Verlag Erziehung und Wissenschaft, Hamburg 1980.
- Essen und Trinken im Holsteiner Land. Illustrations for a cookery book. Verlag Gustav Weiland Nachf., Lübeck 1981.
- Wundersames Wolfenbüttel. Verkehrsverein und Kulturbund, Wolfenbüttel 1982.
- Hans und Heinz Kirch. Illustrations for a novella of Theodor Storm. Christians Verlag, Hamburg 1983, ISBN 3-7672-0819-9.
- Malerisches Münster. Text by Wolfgang Schemann. Edition Schnake, Münster 1984. ISBN 3-924264-01-5.
- Sonderbar schönes Goslar. Stubengalerie, Goslar 1987.
- Coburger Bilder. Druck- und Verlagsanstalt Neue Presse, Coburg 1989.
- Ein himmlisches Vergnügen – eine Reise mit der Donauprinzessin. Text by Horst Krüger. Deilmann shipping company, Neustadt 1990.
- Schönes Goslar und darüber hinaus. Stubengalerie, Goslar 1991.
- Troisdorf – auf den Spuren einer Stadt. Gallery Donath, Troisdorf 1992.
- Wie Gott in Frankreich – meine Reise mit der Princesse de Provence. Text by Horst Krüger. Deilmann shipping company, Neustadt 1992.
- Dello Editionen. Hamburg 1996.
