= Gerd Wolandt =

German 20th-century philosopher

Gerd Wolandt (10 February 1928 − 3 February 1997) was a German philosopher and academic teacher.

== Life and career ==
Wolangt was born in Heiligenhaus. After his family moved to Karthaus (West Prussia) in 1940, Wolandt first attended the St. Johann grammar school in Danzig and later the secondary school in Berent. At the end of the Second World War, he was conscripted into the Reich Labour Service in 1944 and then as a HJ-Marinehelfer. He then took his Abitur in Velbert, having returned to the Rhineland after the war.

In 1954, he received his doctorate under Hans Wagner in Würzburg. With his study Gegenständlichkeit und Gliederung (Representationalism and Structure), he presented the first comprehensive account of Richard Hönigswald's philosophy in 1964. According to Rudolf Hoffmann (* 1929), the work showed how much closer Hönigswald's philosophy is to the historical Kant than any of the basic Neo-Kantian doctrines. In 1967, Wolandt was appointed professor in Bonn and in 1977 moved to the RWTH Aachen as professor of general philosophy.

== Publications ==
- Um einen Kant von innen bittend. Zur Bedeutung des großen Philosophen für unsere Zeit. With a biographical note by Stephan Nachtsheim. Bonn 1997.
- Letztbegründung und Tatsachenbezug. Bonn 1983.
- Idealismus und Faktizität. Berlin 1971.
- Philosophie der Dichtung. Weltstellung und Gegenständlichkeit des poetischen Gedankens. Berlin 1965.
- Gegenständlichkeit und Gliederung. Untersuchungen zur Prinzipientheorie Richard Hönigwalds mit besonderer Rücksicht auf das Problem der Monadologie. Cologne 1964.
