= Theresa Georgen =

German art historian

Theresa Georgen (born 1946) is a German art historian and retired professor.

== Career ==
Born in Mainz in 1946. Georgen studied art history and archaeology in Mainz, Tübingen, and London obtained her doctorate in 1976 in Vienna on the topic Liber ad honorem Augusti of Petrus de Ebulo by Otto Pächt. After working as benevolent curator and lecturer at Darmstadt, Berlin and Bern art museums, she was appointed professor for art history at the Fachhochschule Kiel in 1986, and since 1994 at the Muthesius Academy of Art, where Georgen was prorectorin, from 1995 to 1999.

In 1993, Georgen was the founding director of the "Instituts für Frauenforschung (IGD)" at the Kiel University of Applied Sciences Institute for Women's Studies (IGD) and from October 2000 to July 2004 she was the director of the "Forum for Interdisciplinary Studies" at the Muthesius Academy of Art. Georgen is a member of the jury of the Körber Foundation for the German Study Prize and member of the "public art" commission of the Prime Minister of the State of Schleswig-Holstein.

Her research interests are the body in modern art and the constructions of femininity in art. "Bühnen des Selbst" (2006) is dedicated to the special autobiographical positions of contemporary women artists.
