= Hanna Deinhard =

German American art historian

Hanna Deinhard (born Johanna Levy; 28 September 1912 − 14 July 1984) was a German-Brazilian-US art historian.

== Life ==
Born in Osnabrück, German Empire, Johanna (Hanna) Levy was the second child of Leo and Zilla Levy, her father was a partner in the R. Overmeyer Mechanische Kleider-Wäsche-Fabrik. She attended the "Oberlyzeum für höhere Töchter" in Osnabrück and studied art history, philosophy and German at the Ludwig-Maximilians-Universität München from 1932. After the seizure of control in 1933, she travelled to Paris on a student trip and, as she was not allowed to continue her studies in Germany because of the discrimination against Jews, then enrolled at the Sorbonne. She had a love affair with the much older cellist Fritz Deinhard, who emigrated with her. Levy was awarded her doctorate in 1936 with the dissertation Heinrich Wölfflin. Sa théorie. Ses prédécesseurs with Charles Lalo and Henri Focillon. In 1937, she gave a lecture on the need for a sociology of art at the 2nd International Congress of Aesthetics and Art Studies in Paris.

Levy immigrated to Brazil in 1937 with her life partner and quickly learned Portuguese. She also brought her parents to Brazil in 1938, who moved to Petrópolis. Levy obtained a teaching position in Rio de Janeiro at the National Institute of Historic and Artistic Heritage to train state officials in general art history, and published articles in the institution's journal. She made her way through other teaching positions, including professor of modern art and art criticism at the Fundação Getulio Vargas in 1946. She published articles on contemporary Brazilian art in Brazilian magazines, daily newspapers and exhibition catalogues. She became friends with the artist Fayga Ostrower.

In January 1948, they moved to the US, where they legalised their relationship. In 1948, Hanna Deinhard received a position as a lecturer at the New School for Social Research in New York. She supplemented her meagre salary by giving tours of New York museums. In 1956, they moved to Israel, where she learned Hebrew, gave courses and published. As Fritz Deinhard soon died, she returned to New York to the New School in 1957. From 1961 to 1965, she also taught as an associate professor at Bard College and held teaching positions from 1965 until her retirement in 1978 and from 1973 a professorship at Queens College, City University of New York.

The focus of her teaching was on European art history from the mid-18th to the beginning of the 20th century. Her book "Meaning and Expression. Zur Soziologie der Malerei" (Meaning and Expression: The Sociology of Painting) with two essays on the sociology of art was published in 1967. She participated in debates on contemporary art and gave lectures in Germany, Switzerland and Sweden. After the English translation of "Bedeutung und Ausdruck" appeared in 1970, she was invited to contribute to North American journals and was invited to speak at conferences in the US. In 1978, she moved to Basel and still gave courses there at the Volkshochschule util her death there at the age of 71.

Since 2021, the Art History Department of the University of Basel awards once a year the Hanna Levy-Deinhard Prize for particularly outstanding theses. https://kunstgeschichte.philhist.unibas.ch/de/aktuelles/hanna-levy-deinhard-preis/

== Publications ==
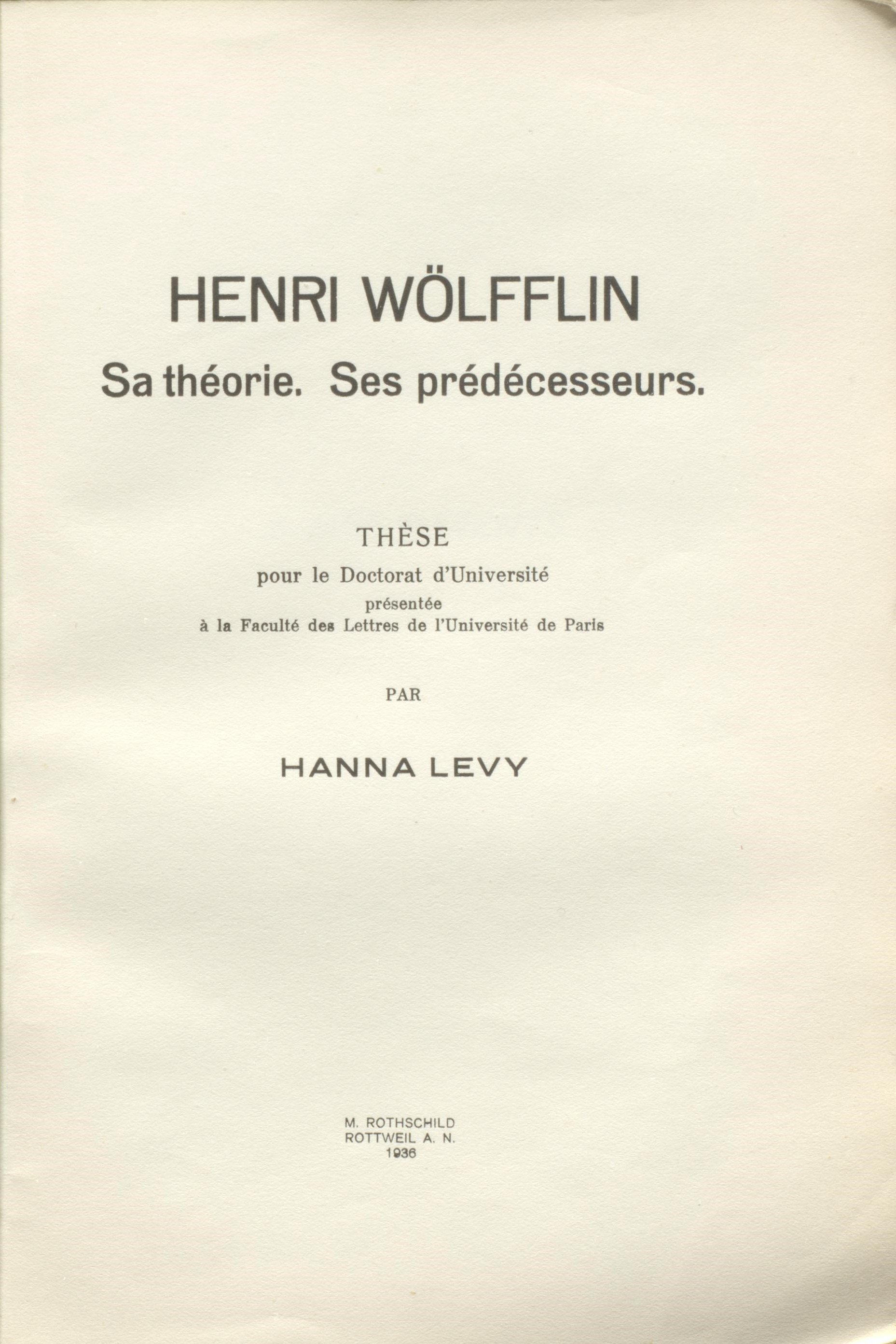
Dissertation in Paris, printed in 1936 in Rottweil

Hanna Levy

- Henri Wölfflin, Sa théorie. Ses prédécesseurs. Rottweil : M. Rothschild, 1936.
- Sur la nécessité d’une sociologie de l’art. In Actes du Deuxième Congrès International d’Esthétique et de Science de l’Art, Paris 1937, {pp.|342|345}.
- A propósito de três teorias sobre o barroco. In Revista do Serviço do Patrimônio Histórico e Artístico Nacional, N. 5, Rio de Janeiro 1941, pp. 259–284 (Numerized; PDF).
- A pintura colonial no Rio de Janeiro. In Revista do Serviço do Patrimônio Histórico e Artístico Nacional, N. 6, Rio de Janeiro 1942, pp. 7–79 (Numerized; PDF).
- Modelos Europeus na Pintura Colonial. In Revista do Serviço do Patrimônio Histórico e Artístico Nacional, N. 8, Rio de Janeiro 1944, pp. 7–66 (Numerized; PDF).
- Retratos coloniais. In Revista do Serviço do Patrimônio Histórico e Artístico Nacional, N. 9, Rio de Janeiro 1945, pp. 251–290 (Numerized; PDF).

Hanna Deinhard

- Bedeutung und Ausdruck. Zur Soziologie der Malerei. Neuwied : Luchterhand 1967.
  - Meaning and expression : toward a sociology of art. Boston, Mass. : Beacon Press, 1970 ISBN 978-080-706-664-5.
- Zur modernen Geschichtsmalerei, in Neue Rundschau 2, 1967, pp. 298–306.
- Twentieth-Century Cities and Their Discontents, in The Journal of Aesthetic Education, vol. 8/2, 1974, pp. 91–96.
- Reflections on Art History and Sociology of Art, in Art Journal 35/1, 1975, pp. 29–32.
- The Work of Art as a Primary Source, in Gerd Wolandt (ed.): Kunst und Kunstforschung. Beiträge zur Ästhetik. Bonn: Bouvier, 1983, pp. 89–96 ISBN 3-416-01749-8.
