= Anthropology of art =

Sub-field of social anthropology

Anthropology of art is a sub-field in social anthropology dedicated to the study of art in different cultural contexts. Traditionally the anthropology of art has focused on historical, economic and aesthetic dimensions in non-Western art forms, including what is known as 'tribal art'. It has now broadened to include all art.

== History ==
Franz Boas, one of the pioneers of modern anthropology, conducted many field studies of the arts, helping create a foundation for the field. His book, Primitive Art (1927), summarizes his main insights into so-called 'primitive' art forms, with a detailed case study on the arts of the Northwest Pacific Coast. The famous anthropologist Claude Lévi-Strauss took Boas' analyses further in his book The Way of the Masks, where he traced changes in the plastic form of Northwest Pacific masks to patterns of intercultural interaction among the indigenous peoples of the coast.

Essential contributions made to the field of art anthropology by M.N. Haidle showcase the biological changes necessary for humans to evolve creative capacities. These changes include precise hand-eye coordination, improvements in information processing systems, improved aesthetic awareness and prioritization, process-oriented teaching, advancements in communication, and the application of abstract concepts. Individuals that have developed such structural and cognitive advancements are enabled to produce art and will be evolutionarily selected for. Ellen Dissanayake has published work which contributes to this concept and suggests that creativity was practiced by only the most fit individuals within a population. Since artistic involvement is not an essential duty, it could only be produced once survival tasks were completed, and therefore, individuals with the highest fitness could partake. This exemplifies the selection of artistic individuals, since fitness is concomitant with participation in leisure activity. Gillian Morriss-Kay addressed preliminary artistic patterns like zig-zag, criss-cross, and parallel lines. Use of patterns indicates advancements in cognition and signifies an evolutionary step towards increasing complexity in imaginative capability. Early interpretations of the human form, as seen in the Venus Figurines and the Lion-man, reflect this evolutionary step by indicating awareness of anatomy and the function of symbolism.

== The Problem of Art ==
One of the central problems in the anthropology of art concerns the universality of 'art' as a cultural phenomenon. Several anthropologists foolishly believed that the Western categories of 'painting', 'sculpture', or 'literature', conceived as independent artistic activities, did not exist, or existed in a significantly different form, in most non-Western contexts. Thus, there is no consensus on a single, cross-cultural definition of 'art' in anthropology. To surmount this difficulty, anthropologists of art have focused on formal features in objects which, without exclusively being 'artistic', have certain evident 'aesthetic' qualities. Boas' Primitive Art, Claude Lévi-Strauss' The Way of the Masks (1982) or Geertz's 'Art as Cultural System' (1983) are some examples in this trend to transform the anthropology of 'art' into an anthropology of culturally-specific 'aesthetics'. More recently, in his book Art and Agency (1998), Alfred Gell proposed a new definition of 'art' as a complex system of intentionality, where artists produce art objects to effect changes in the world, including (but not restricted to) changes in the aesthetic perceptions of art audiences. Gell's ideas stirred a controversy in the anthropology of art in the following decade. His messages through his art connect with the growth of Western art theory in its various forms.

== Art and Culture ==
Throughout the 1960s and 1970s, the field fostered an emphasis on what is referred to as 'ethnoaesthetics', focusing on how culture helps to define and appreciate art. This concept suggests the importance of an aesthetic component in an array of activities within all cultures. A key component of an ethnoaesthetic approach is the anthropologists awareness of 'beauty' being subjective and looking differently across cultures and places. Western standards of art do not apply globally, and art far more intricate, historical, and impressive can be observed in the global south.

Key exhibitions that illuminates these cultural trends are "“Primitivism” in Twentieth Century Art (1984, Museum of Modern Art, New York) and Te Maori (1984, Metropolitan Museum of Art, New York). Other influences in ethnoaesthetic practice include Pierre Bourdieu (1984, 1993), Becker (1982), Said (1978), and Danto (1964, 1981). This era of art and anthropology mark a shift from more formalist forms of modernism, to cultural activism.

== Bibliography ==
- Boas, Franz. (1927) Primitive Art. New York: Dover
- Coote, Jeremy and Anthony Shelton, eds. (1992) Anthropology Art and Aesthetics. Oxford: Clarendon Press ISBN 0-19-827945-0
- Descola, Philippe. (2021) Les formes du visible : une anthropologie de la figuration. Paris: Editions du Seuil.
- Dissanayake, E. 1974. A hypothesis of the evolution of art from play. Leonardo 7(3) : 211–217.
- Forge, Anthony, ed. (1973) Primitive Art & Society. Oxford: Oxford University Press
- Forge, Anthony. (1979) The Problem of Meaning in Art, in Exploring the Visual Art of Oceania. Sidney M. Mead, ed. Honolulu: Hawaii University Press, pp. 278–286
- Geertz, Clifford. (1983). Art as a Cultural System, in Local Knowledge: Further Essays in Interpretive Anthropology. New York: Basic Books
- Gell, Alfred. (1998) Art and Agency: An Anthropological Theory of Art. Oxford: Oxford University Press ISBN 0-19-828014-9
- Haidle, M.N. (2014). Examining the evolution of artistic capacities: searching for mushrooms? In Sütterlin, Christa, Wulf Schiefenhövel, Christian Lehmann, Johanna Forster & Gerhard Apfelauer (eds.), Art as behaviour. An ethological approach to visual and verbal art, music and architecture. Bis-Verlag der Carl von Ossietzky Universität Oldenburg, Oldenburg, 237–251.
- Hatcher, Evelyn Payne. (1985) Art As Culture: An Introduction to the Anthropology of Art. Lanham: University Press of America ISBN 0-89789-628-9
- Layton, Robert. (1981) The Anthropology of Art. Cambridge: Cambridge University Press ISBN 978-0-521-36894-0
- Lévi-Strauss, Claude. (1982) The Way of the Masks, translated by Sylvia Modelski. Seattle: University of Washington Press
- Marcus, George and Myers, Fred "The traffic in Culture: Refiguring Art and Anthropology". University of California, California 2008
- Morphy, Howard and Morgan Perkins, eds. (2006) The Anthropology of Art: A Reader. Malden, MA: Blackwell Publishing
- Morriss-Kay, G.M. 2010. The evolution of human artistic creativity. Journal of Anatomy 216(2) : 158–176.
- Munn, Nancy. (1973) Walpiri Iconography. Ithaca: Cornell University Press
- Price, Sally. (1989) Primitive Art in Civilized Places. Chicago: University of Chicago Press

== See also ==
- Sociology of art
