= Bertrand Freiesleben =

German sculptor

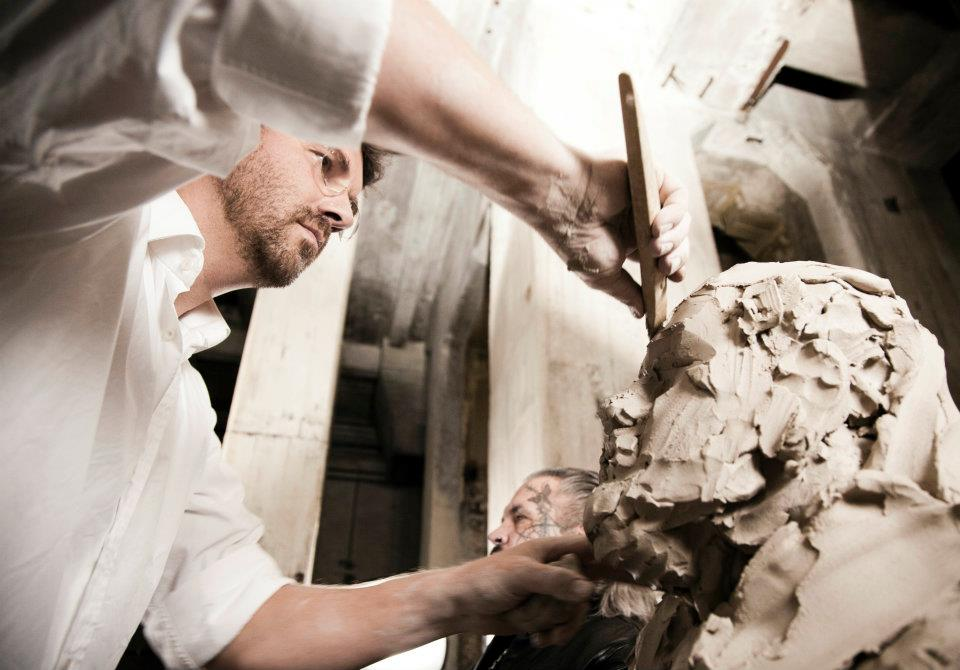
- 2016
- Born: 4 October 1967 (age 58); Lübeck, West Germany
- Known for: Sculpture

Bertrand Freiesleben (born 4 October 1967 in Lübeck, West Germany) is a German artist.

== Early life ==
Freiesleben's father is a microbiologist and his mother works as a hand weaver.

== Education and career ==
After Graduating from Johanneum zu Lübeck and the completion of his civil service, he studied sculpture at the Muthesius Academy of Fine Arts and Design in Kiel. However, he abandoned his studies to relocate to New York City where he worked as a conceptual artist till 1992. After returning to Germany, he studied both the History of Art and Philosophy at the Free University of Berlin till 1998.

In 1998, he received the Grand Prix de l’Académie des Beaux-Arts (Prix de portrait Paul-Louis Weiller) of the Institut de France. After the completion of his studies, Freiesleben taught compositional analysis and surface geometry at the Institute of Art History

at the Free University of Berlin till 2005. In 2000, he was invited to be a guest professor at Université Paris 8 to initiate and direct the Erasmus Intensive Program “La sculpture dans la ville”.

Freiesleben works only from live models. For the past three decades, his work has been largely devoted to sculpted portraits.

He is married to the painter Eva Scheide and they have three children. They live and work in Berlin, Germany.

== Public Works and Works in Public Collections ==
- Konrad-Adenauer-Stiftung, Berlin (Bernhard Vogel)
- San Francisco Opera, War Memorial Opera House, San Francisco (Pamela Rosenberg)
- Institute of Music University of Applied Sciences, Foyer, Osnabrück (Dieter Fuchs)
- Deutscher Bundestag, Matthias Erzberger Haus, pavement Unter den Linden, Berlin (Matthias Erzberger), https://www.bundestag.de/dokumente/textarchiv/2021/kw20-erzberger-841656,
- Schachgesellschaft Zürich, Zürich (Viktor Kortschnoi)
- Fuchs Gewürze, Foyer, Dissen (Dieter Fuchs)
- Kurhaus, Bad Pyrmont (Zar Peter der Große, Gottfried Wilhelm Leibniz)
- Federal Ministry for Economic Affairs and Climate Action (BMWK), Berlin (Karl Schiller)
- Berliner Philharmonie, Südfoyer, Stiftung der Berliner Philharmoniker, Berlin (Claudio Abbado)
- Bücherbogen Berlin („Das Archiv“, Walter Kempowski)
- LMU Munich, München (Gerd Plewig)
- Museum Folkwang, Essen (Berthold Beitz)
- Tomb of Johannes Heesters Nordfriedhof (München) (Johannes Heesters)
- Office of the Federal President (Horst Köhler, Christian Wulff)
- Kathedrale St. Florin, Vaduz, Liechtenstein (Franz Josef II. Prince of Liechtenstein, Countess Georgina von Wilczek (Princess consort of Liechtenstein))
- Freiberg Sachsen Obermarkt (Hannß-Carl von Carlowitz)
- Alfried Krupp von Bohlen und Halbach Foundation, Essen (Berthold Beitz)
- Foyer HARIBO Bonn, (Hans Riegel, Paul Riegel)
- Richard von Weizsäcker-Schule, Schellerten (Richard von Weizsäcker)
- Alfried Krupp Wissenschaftskolleg Greifswald (Berthold Beitz)
- Friedrich Naumann Foundation Potsdam (Walter Scheel)
- Thyssenkrupp Essen (Ralf Dahrendorf)
- Richard von Weizsäcker-Schule, Öhringen (Richard von Weizsäcker)
- University of Konstanz (Ralf Dahrendorf)
- FDP Bundesgeschäftsstelle, Berlin (Walter Scheel)
- Design of the Ralf-Dahrendorf-Award for Local Journalism Badische Zeitung Freiburg im Breisgau
- Design of the Walter-Scheel-Preis commissioned by the Cabinet of Germany
- Humboldt University of Berlin (Hans von Dohnanyi)
- Federal Ministry for Economic Cooperation and Development (BMZ) Berlin (Walter Scheel)
- Deutsche Gesellschaft für Personalführung (DGFP) (Walter Scheel)
- FDP-Fraktion des Bundestages (Walter Scheel, Ralf Dahrendorf)
- London School of Economics and Political Science (LSE) (Ralf Dahrendorf)
- Bechtler Museum of Modern Art Charlotte (North Carolina) (Cellist Ludwig Quandt)
- HSV-Museum Hamburg (Uwe Seeler)
- Kempowski Archiv Rostock, Rostock (Walter Kempowski)
- Kempowski Stiftung Haus Kreienhoop, Nartum (Walter Kempowski)
- Rathaus Stadt Solingen (Walter Scheel)
- Interfinanz (Walter Scheel)
- Hoftheater Dresden-Weißig (Rolf Hoppe)
- Design of the Copyright-Award „The Idea“ for Microsoft
- Friedrich Naumann Foundation, Potsdam (Walter Scheel)
- Gesellschaft zur Beförderung gemeinnütziger Tätigkeit, Lübeck (Abram Bernardowitch Enns)
