= Maria Kublitz-Kramer =

German literary scholar

Maria Kublitz-Kramer is a German literary scholar and was a lecturer at the Oberstufen-Kolleg Bielefeld.

== Life ==
Kublitz-Kramer studied German in Paderborn and obtained a Doctorate (PhD) in 1995. From 1989 to 1996, she was a research assistant in the Department of General Literary Studies at the University of GH Paderborn. She taught the subject German at the Oberstufenkolleg Bielefeld, was Academic Director at Bielefeld University and from 2003 to 2007 was Deputy Academic Director of the Oberstufen-Kolleg.

Kublitz-Kramer was co-founder of the literature series "Readings on Field 2" at the Oberstufenkolleg and published numerous texts.

== Main areas of work ==
Her work focuses on literary studies and gender, literary theory and didactics, Jewish authors as well as cultural studies topics and interdisciplinary teaching (project management).
