= Eugénia Cândida da Fonseca da Silva Mendes, 1st Baroness of Silva =

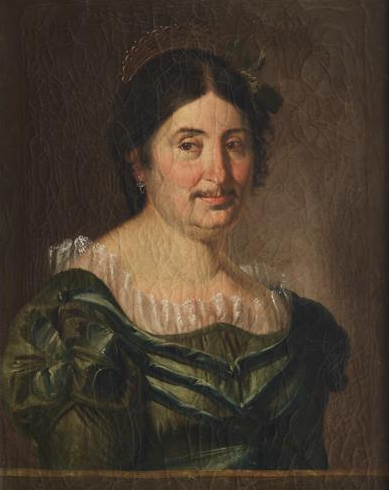
Portrait of the Baroness of Silva (1820s), by José de Almeida Furtado

Eugénia Cândida da Fonseca da Silva Mendes (died 1843) was a Portuguese baroness and landowner. She was born to José António da Fonseca and Perpétua Maria Xavier, and married João da Silva Mendes. Da Silva Mendes was of considerable wealth, and was a notable landowner. She is known for her political activity, especially during the 1820s, when she was the main financier of the Portuguese Liberals.
